= List of Canadian films of 1997 =

This is a list of Canadian films which were released in 1997.

Title	Director	Cast	Genre	Notes
L'Absent	Céline Baril		Experimental feature	
Air Bud	Charles Martin Smith	Michael Jeter, Wendy Makkena	Family film	Golden Reel Award; made with U.S. financing
The Assignment	Christian Duguay	Aidan Quinn, Donald Sutherland, Ben Kingsley, Claudia Ferri, Céline Bonnier	Thriller	
Les Boys	Louis Saia	Marc Messier, Rémy Girard, Patrick Huard, Serge Thériault, Michel Barrette, Paul Houde	Comedy	Golden Reel Award
The Boys Club	John Fawcett	Chris Penn, Dominic Zamprogna, Stuart Stone, Devon Sawa	Drama	
bp: pushing the boundaries	Brian Nash	bpNichol	Documentary	
The Caretaker's Lodge (La Conciergerie)	Michel Poulette	Serge Dupire, Michel Forget, Macha Grenon	Drama	
Chile, Obstinate Memory (Chile, la memoria obstinada)	Patricio Guzmán		Documentary	Chilean, Canadian, Belgian, German and French coproduction
Cotton Candy	Roshell Bissett	Yôko Higashi, Mitsuka Ohbuchi, Kazutoyo Yoshimi	Short drama	
Cube	Vincenzo Natali	Maurice Dean Wint, Nicky Guadagni, David Hewlett, Julian Richings	Thriller	First in the Cube film series
Dead Fire	Robert Lee	Matt Frewer, C. Thomas Howell	TV drama	
Drive, She Said	Mina Shum	Moira Kelly, Sebastian Spence	Drama, romance	
Drowning in Dreams	Tim Southam		Documentary	
Erotica: A Journey Into Female Sexuality	Maya Gallus	Annie Sprinkle, Candida Royalle, Susie Bright, Catherine Robbe-Grillet, Bettina Rheims, Anne Desclos	Documentary	
Four Women of Egypt	Tahani Rached	Safinaz Kazem	National Film Board documentary	
Le Grand silence	Gilles Blais		Documentary	
The Hanging Garden	Thom Fitzgerald	Chris Leavins, Troy Veinotte, Seana McKenna, Peter MacNeill	Comedy-drama	Toronto International Film Festival – Best Canadian Feature, People's Choice Award; Canada-U.K. co-production
Hayseed	Josh Levy, Andrew Hayes	Jamie Shannon, Deborah Theaker, Scott Thompson, Mark McKinney	Comedy	
Heads or Tails (J'en suis!)	Claude Fournier	Roy Dupuis, Patrick Huard, Charlotte Laurier	Comedy	
How Wings Are Attached to the Backs of Angels	Craig Welsh	voice Louise Leroux	National Film Board animated short	Gold Hugo, Chicago International Film Festival
Kitchen Party	Gary Burns	Scott Speedman, Tygh Runyan	Comedy, drama	
Love and Death on Long Island	Richard Kwietniowski	John Hurt, Jason Priestley, Fiona Loewi, Maury Chaykin	Drama	Canada-U.K. co-production
Men with Guns	Kari Skogland	Donal Logue, Gregory Sporleder, Paul Sorvino, Callum Keith Rennie	Crime drama	
Pale Saints	Joel Wyner	Sean Patrick Flanery, Michael Riley, Saul Rubinek, Rachael Crawford	Crime drama	
Pippi Longstocking	Clive Smith	voices Melissa Altro, Gordon Pinsent, Catherine O'Hara, Carole Pope, Dave Thomas	Animated feature	Canada-German-Sweden co-production
The Planet of Junior Brown	Clément Virgo	Martin Villafana, Lynn Whitfield, Rainbow Francks, Margot Kidder, Sarah Polley	TV drama	Shown at the Toronto International Film Festival
The Rage	Sidney J. Furie	Gary Busey, Lorenzo Lamas, Roy Scheider	Action	
Red-Blooded American Girl II	David Blyth	Kari Wuhrer, Burt Young, David Keith	Thriller	
The Revenge of the Woman in Black (La vengeance de la femme en noir)	Roger Cantin	Germain Houde, Marc Labrèche, Raymond Bouchard, France Castel	Comedy	
The Seat of the Soul (Le siège de l'âme)	Olivier Asselin	Emmanuel Bilodeau, Lucille Fluet, Rémy Girard	Drama	
Sleeping Dogs	Michael Bafaro	Scott McNeil, C. Thomas Howell	Sci-Fi, Action	Canada-Czech Republic-Germany co-production
The Sweet Hereafter	Atom Egoyan	Ian Holm, Sarah Polley, Tom McCamus, Bruce Greenwood, Gabrielle Rose, Alberta Watson, Arsinée Khanjian	Drama based on the novel by Russell Banks;	Atom Egoyan is the first director of a Canadian dramatic feature to be nominated Best Director at the Oscars.
Tu as crié Let Me Go	Anne Claire Poirier		National Film Board documentary	Genie Award for Best Documentary
Twilight of the Ice Nymphs	Guy Maddin	Pascale Bussières, Shelley Duvall, Frank Gorshin, R. H. Thomson	Fantasy drama	
Twists of Terror	Douglas Jackson	Jennifer Rubin, Françoise Robertson, Nick Mancuso, Joseph Ziegler	Horror	
Uncut	John Greyson	Matthew Ferguson, Michael Achtman	Drama	
Under the Weather (À l'ombre)	Tali Prévost		Animated short	
Unveiled: The Mother/Daughter Relationship	Maureen Judge		Documentary	
Wounded	Richard Martin	Mädchen Amick, Graham Greene	Crime thriller	
The Wrong Guy	David Steinberg	Dave Foley, Jennifer Tilly, Enrico Colantoni, Colm Feore	Comedy	Canada-U.K. co-production
Zie 37 Stagen	Sylvain Guy	Thierry Frémont, Denis Mercier, Dino Tavarone	Short drama	

== See also ==
- 1997 in Canada
- 1997 in Canadian television
