= Red Queen Productions =

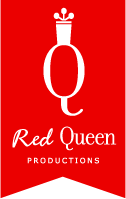
- Industry: Canadian Documentary Production Company
- Founder: Maya Gallus & Justine Pimlott
- Website: redqueenproductions.com

Red Queen Productions is a Toronto-based, Canadian cinema company founded by filmmakers Maya Gallus and Justine Pimlott, dedicated to creating films about women, social issues, culture and the arts. Their films have screened internationally at Sheffield Doc/Fest, Dok Leipzig, SEOUL International Women’s Film Festival, Women Make Waves (Taiwan), This Human World Film Festival (Vienna), Singapore International Film Festival, Frameline Film Festival (San Francisco), Outfest (LA) and Newfest (New York), among others, and have been broadcast around the world. Their work has won numerous awards, including a Gemini Award for Best Direction for Girl Inside.

== Films ==
Film	Year	Director(s)	Producer(s)	Reference
Elizabeth Smart: On the Side of the Angels	1991	Maya Gallus	Maya Gallus, Janice Dawe	
Erotica: A Journey Into Female Sexuality	1997	Maya Gallus		
Laugh in the Dark	2000	Justine Pimlott	Justine Pimlott	
Punch Like a Girl	2003	Maya Gallus & Justine Pimlott	Justine Pimlott, Maya Gallus, Moira Holmes	
Fag Hags: Women Who Love Gay Men	2005	Justine Pimlott	Maya Gallus, Justine Pimlott, Judy Holm	
Girl Inside	2007	Maya Gallus	Justine Pimlott & Maya Gallus	
Cat City	2009	Justine Pimlott	Justine Pimlott & Maya Gallus	
Dish – Women, Waitressing & the Art of Service	2010	Maya Gallus	Justine Pimlott & Maya Gallus	
The Mystery of Mazo de la Roche	2012	Maya Gallus	Justine Pimlott, Anita Lee, Maya Gallus, Silva Basmajian	
Derby Crazy Love	2013	Maya Gallus & Justine Pimlott	Justine Pimlott & Maya Gallus	
The Heat: A Kitchen (R)evolution	2018	Maya Gallus	Maya Gallus & Howard Fraiberg	
Crush: Message in a Bottle	2023	Maya Gallus	Maya Gallus & Howard Fraiberg	

== Awards and nominations ==
Most, Festival internacional de Cinema del Vi i el Cava

- 2023: Sustainability Award: Crush: Message in the Bottle (Award)

Donald Brittain Award

- 2019: Best Social or Political Documentary Program: The Heat: A Kitchen (R)evolution (Nomination)

Canadian Screen Award

- 2019: Best Photography in a Documentary Program or Factual Series: The Heat: A Kitchen (R)evolution (Nomination)

Bay Street Film Festival

- 2014: People’s Choice Award: Derby Crazy Love (Award)

Canadian Screen Awards

- 2014: Best Editing in a Documentary: Derby Crazy Love (Nomination)
- 2012: Best Editing in a Documentary: The Mystery of Mazo de la Roche (Nomination)
- 2012: Best Cinematography in a Documentary: The Mystery of Mazo de la Roche (Nomination)
- 2012: Barbara Sears Documentary Award: The Mystery of Mazo de la Roche (Nomination)

Canadian Cinema Editors Awards

- 2014: Best Editing: Derby Crazy Love (Nomination)
- 2012: Best Editing: The Mystery of Mazo de la Roche (Nomination)
- 2011: Best Editing: Dish-Women, Waitressing & the Art of Service (Nomination)

Gemini Awards

- 2010: Best Editing in a Documentary – Dish, Women, Waitressing & the Art of Service (Nomination)
- 2008: Best Direction in a Documentary - Girl Inside (Award)
- 2008: Donald Brittain Award for Best Social Political Documentary – Girl Inside (Nomination)
- 2004: Best Direction in a Documentary Series – 2 eps: The Boxers Heart & Battle of the Titans - Punch Like A Girl (Nomination)

Inside Out Film and Video Festival

- 2005: Best Documentary– Fag Hags: Women Who Love Gay Men (Award)

Reel Out Film Festival

- 2006: Best Canadian Film – Fag Hags: Women Who Love Gay Men (Award)

Sheffield Adventure Film Festival

- 2015: Best Women in Adventure Film, Bronze: Derby Crazy Love (Sheffield, UK)[12] (Award)
- 2015: Best Soundtrack, Gold: Derby Crazy Love (Sheffield, UK)[13] (Award)
- 2015: Special Jury Citation, Best Film: Derby Crazy Love (Sheffield, UK)

Yorkton Film Festival, Golden Sheaf Awards

- 2011: Best Social Political Documentary - The Mystery of Mazo de la Roche (Award)
