= 1997 Toronto International Film Festival =

Annual Canadian film festival

- Festival poster
- Opening film: The Sweet Hereafter
- Closing film: Seven Years in Tibet
- Location: Toronto, Ontario, Canada
- Hosted by: Toronto International Film Festival Group
- No. of films: 279 films
- Festival date: September 4, 1997–September 13, 1997
- Language: English
- Website: tiff.net
- 1998 1996

The 22nd Toronto International Film Festival ran from September 4 to September 13, 1997. This festival was notable for the introduction of the Masters programme to TIFF.

== Awards ==
Award	Film	Director
People's Choice Award	The Hanging Garden	Thom Fitzgerald
Metro Media Award	Boogie Nights	Paul Thomas Anderson
Metro Media Award	L.A. Confidential	Curtis Hanson
Best Canadian Feature Film	The Hanging Garden	Thom Fitzgerald
Best Canadian Feature Film	The Sweet Hereafter	Atom Egoyan
Best Canadian First Feature Film	Cube	Vincenzo Natali
Best Canadian Short Film	Cotton Candy	Roshell Bissett
Best Canadian Short Film - Special Mention	bp: pushing the boundaries	Brian Nash
FIPRESCI International Critics' Award	Under the Skin	Carine Adler

== Programme ==
=== Gala Opening Night ===
English Title	Original Title	Director(s)	Production Country
The Sweet Hereafter		Atom Egoyan	Canada

=== Gala Closing Night ===
English Title	Original Title	Director(s)	Production Country
Seven Years in Tibet		Jean-Jacques Annaud	United States

=== Gala Presentations ===
English Title	Original Title	Director(s)	Production Country
The Apostle		Robert Duvall	United States
Artemisia		Agnès Merlet	France, Italy, Germany
The Assignment		Christian Duguay	Canada
Chinese Box		Wayne Wang	France, Japan, United States
The Edge		Lee Tamahori	United States
Eve's Bayou		Kasi Lemmons	United States
FairyTale: A True Story		Charles Sturridge	United Kingdom, United States
Gattaca		Andrew Niccol	United States
In & Out		Frank Oz	United States
L.A. Confidential		Curtis Hanson	United States
Marquise		Véra Belmont	France, Italy, Spain, Switzerland
Men with Guns		John Sayles	United States, Mexico
Mrs Dalloway		Marleen Gorris	Netherlands, United Kingdom, United States
Regeneration		Gillies MacKinnon	United Kingdom, Canada
Swept from the Sea		Beeban Kidron	United Kingdom, United States
Washington Square		Agnieszka Holland	United States
The Wings of the Dove		Iain Softley	United States, United Kingdom

=== Special Presentations ===
English Title	Original Title	Director(s)	Production Country
4 Little Girls		Spike Lee	United States
Afterglow		Alan Rudolph	United States
The Alarmist		Evan Dunsky	United States
The Big One		Michael Moore	United States, United Kingdom
The Blackout		Abel Ferrara	United States, France
The Blood Oranges		Philip Haas	United States
Boogie Nights		Paul Thomas Anderson	United States
Face		Antonia Bird	United Kingdom
Fast, Cheap & Out of Control		Errol Morris	United States
Hana-bi		Takeshi Kitano	Japan
Henry Fool		Hal Hartley	United States
The Hips of J.W.	Le Bassin de J.W.	João César Monteiro	Portugal, France
The House of Yes		Mark Waters	United States
The Informant		Jim McBride	Ireland, United States
Inspirations		Michael Apted	Israel, United States
Loved		Erin Dignam	United States
Mr. Jealousy		Noah Baumbach	United States
My Best Girl		Sam Taylor	United States
Nil by Mouth		Gary Oldman	United Kingdom, France
One Night Stand		Mike Figgis	United States
Pronto		Jim McBride	United States
The Spanish Prisoner		David Mamet	United States
Suicide Kings		Peter O'Fallon	United States
The Tango Lesson		Sally Potter	United Kingdom, France, Germany, Netherlands, Argentina
Two Girls and a Guy		James Toback	United States
Welcome to Sarajevo		Michael Winterbottom	United Kingdom, United States
Year of the Horse		Jim Jarmusch	United States

=== Masters ===
English Title	Original Title	Director(s)	Production Country
The Castle	Das Schloß	Michael Haneke	Austria, Germany, France
The Eel	うなぎ	Shōhei Imamura	Japan
Esmeralda Comes by Night	De noche vienes, Esmeralda	Jaime Humberto Hermosillo	Mexico
Funny Games		Michael Haneke	Austria
Iruvar		Mani Ratnam	India
Keep Cool	有话好好说	Zhang Yimou	Hong Kong, China
Mon oncle Antoine		Claude Jutra	Canada
Moon Over Broadway		Chris Hegedus, D. A. Pennebaker	United States
Mother and Son	Мать и сын	Alexander Sokurov	Russia, Germany
The Scar	Blizna	Krzysztof Kieślowski	Poland
Voyage to the Beginning of the World	Viagem ao Princípio do Mundo	Manoel de Oliveira	Portugal, France

=== Perspective Canada ===
English Title	Original Title	Director(s)	Production Country
1919		Noam Gonick	Canada
The Absent One	L'absent	Céline Baril	Canada
Across		Cara Morton	Canada
Anna à la lettre C		Hugo Brochu	Canada
The Big Pickle		Gary Yates	Canada
bp: pushing the boundaries		Brian Nash	Canada
Breakfast with Gus		Siobhan Devine	Canada
Bury Me Happy		Brian McPhail	Canada
City of Dark		Bruno Lazaro	Canada
Cosmos		Manon Briand, André Turpin, Marie-Julie Dallaire, Denis Villeneuve, Jennifer Alleyn, Arto Paragamian	Canada
Cotton Candy		Roshell Bissett	Canada, Japan
The Countess of Baton Rouge	La comtesse de Bâton Rouge	André Forcier	Canada
Cube		Vincenzo Natali	Canada
Dance with Me		Cassandra Nicolaou	Canada
Drive, She Said		Mina Shum	Canada
Drowning in Dreams		Tim Southam	Canada
Erotica: A Journey Into Female Sexuality		Maya Gallus	Canada
Fresh Off the Boat		Peter Demas	Canada
Gerrie & Louise		Sturla Gunnarsson	Canada
Grace Eternal		Neil Burns	Canada
Guise		Wrik Mead	Canada
Guy Maddin: Waiting for Twilight		Noam Gonick	Canada
The Hanging Garden		Thom Fitzgerald	Canada, United Kingdom
Hayseed		Josh Levy, Andrew Hayes	Canada
The Hazards of Falling Glass		John Martins-Manteiga	Canada
Incantation		Cara Morton	Canada
Kid Nerd		Shereen Jerrett	Canada
Kitchen Party		Gary Burns	Canada
Linear Dreams		Richard Reeves	Canada
The Mao Lounge		Chad Derrick	Canada
Men with Guns		Kari Skogland	Canada
Museum		Chris Walsh	Canada
Permission		Daniel MacIvor	Canada
Pitch		Spencer Rice, Kenny Hotz	Canada
The Planet of Junior Brown		Clement Virgo	Canada
Question of Reality		Barry Gibson	Canada
The Seat of the Soul	Le siège de l'âme	Olivier Asselin	Canada
Shift		Shaun Cathcart	Canada
Shooting Indians: A Journey with Jeffrey Thomas		Ali Kazimi	Canada
Shopping for Fangs		Quentin Lee, Justin Lin	Canada, United States
The Skating Party		Marcia Connolly, Janet Hawkwood	Canada
The Swimming Lesson	La lección de natación	Sheri Elwood	Canada, Mexico
Tu as crié LET ME GO		Anne Claire Poirier	Canada
Twilight of the Ice Nymphs		Guy Maddin	Canada
Two Feet, One Angel		Ramiro Puerta	Canada
Uncut		John Greyson	Canada
La vie arrêtée		Martine Allard	Canada
We Are Experiencing Technical Difficulties. Regular Programming Will Resume Momentarily		John Kneller	Canada
What Goes Around		Lloyd Surdi	Canada
White Cloud, Blue Mountain		Keith Behrman	Canada
Zie 37 Stagen		Sylvain Guy	Canada

=== Contemporary World Cinema ===
English Title	Original Title	Director(s)	Production Country
After Sex	Post coïtum animal triste	Brigitte Roüan	France
Ashes of Paradise	Cenizas del paraíso	Marcelo Piñeyro	Argentina
The Assistant		Daniel Petrie	Canada, United Kingdom
Bird Watching	バードウォッチング	Shinobu Yaguchi	Japan
Blinded	A ciegas	Daniel Calparsoro	Spain
Brain Holiday	脳の休日	Hineki Mito	Japan
A Brother...	Un frère...	Sylvie Verheyde	France
Brother	Брат	Aleksei Balabanov	Russia
Character	Karakter	Mike van Diem	Netherlands, Belgium
Close To		David Ottenhouse	United States
Conceiving Ada		Lynn Hershman Leeson	United States, Germany
Delirium	Diliryo	Peque Gallaga, Lore Reyes	Philippines
Devil's Island	Djöflaeyjan	Friðrik Þór Friðriksson	Iceland, Germany, Norway, Denmark
The Diagonal Thief	Le Voleur de diagonale	Jean Darrigol	France
Doing Time for Patsy Cline		Chris Kennedy	Australia
Dry Cleaning	Nettoyage à sec	Anne Fontaine	France, Spain
East Palace, West Palace	東宮西宮	Zhang Yuan	China, France
Four Days in September	O Que É Isso, Companheiro?	Bruno Barreto	Brazil, United States
A Friend of the Deceased	Приятель небіжчика	Viacheslav Kryshtofovych	France, Ukraine
The Girl with Brains in Her Feet		Roberto Bangura	United Kingdom
Gummo		Harmony Korine	United States
Hanoi-Winter 1946	Hà Nội mùa đông năm 46	Đặng Nhật Minh	Vietnam
Happy Together	春光乍洩	Wong Kar-wai	Hong Kong, South Korea, Japan
Heaven's Burning		Craig Lahiff	Australia
Homesick Eyes	望鄉	Hsu Hsiao-ming	Taiwan
I Think I Do		Brian Sloan	United States
Inside/Out		Rob Tregenza	United States
Insomnia		Erik Skjoldbjærg	Norway
The James Gang		Mike Barker	United Kingdom
Junk Food	ジャンクフード	Masashi Yamamoto	Japan
Junk Mail	Budbringeren	Pål Sletaune	Norway
Keep the Aspidistra Flying		Robert Bierman	United Kingdom
Kiss or Kill		Bill Bennett	Australia
Labyrinth of Dreams	ユメノ銀河	Gakuryū Ishii	Japan
The Leading Hand	手の話	Masahiro Muramatsu	Japan
The Life of Jesus	La Vie de Jésus	Bruno Dumont	France
Long Twilight	Hosszú alkony	Attila Janisch	Hungary
Love and Death on Long Island		Richard Kwietniowski	United Kingdom, Canada, Italy
Love, Math and Sex	C'est la tangente que je préfère	Charlotte Silvera	Switzerland, France, Belgium
Ma vie en rose		Alain Berliner	Belgium, France, United Kingdom
Majorettes in Space	Des majorettes dans l'espace	David Fourier	France
The Maker		Tim Hunter	United States
The Man in Selya's Life	Ang Lalaki sa Buhay ni Selya	Carlos Siguion-Reyna	Philippines
Marius and Jeannette	Marius et Jeannette	Robert Guédiguian	France
Metroland		Philip Saville	Spain, France, United Kingdom
The Mirror	آینه	Jafar Panahi	Iran
Misfortune's End	Giải hạn	Vũ Xuân Hưng	Vietnam
Murmur of Youth	美麗在唱歌	Lin Cheng-sheng	Taiwan
The Myth of Fingerprints		Bart Freundlich	United States
No Child of Mine		Peter Kosminsky	United Kingdom
Obsession		Peter Sehr	France, Germany
Okke-ke Bibirobos	おっけっ毛ビビロボス	Takuji Suzuki	Japan
Onibi: The Fire Within	鬼火	Rokurō Mochizuki	Japan
Our Boy		David Evans	United Kingdom
The Oyster and the Wind	A Ostra e o Vento	Walter Lima Jr.	Brazil
Passage	Pasáž	Juraj Herz	Czech Republic, France, Belgium
Port Djema		Eric Heumann	France, Italy, Greece
Private Confessions	Enskilda samtal	Liv Ullmann	Sweden
Rizal in Dapitan	Rizal sa Dapitan	Tikoy Aguiluz	Philippines
The Rocking Horse Winner		Michael Almereyda	United States
Silvester Countdown		Oskar Roehler	Germany
The Soong Sisters	宋家皇朝	Mabel Cheung	Hong Kong, Japan, China
Stolen Moments	Momentos robados	Oscar Barney Finn	Argentina
Stowaways	Clandestins	Denis Chouinard, Nicolas Wadimoff	Switzerland, Canada, France, Belgium
Sue		Amos Kollek	United States
Suzaku	萌の朱雀	Naomi Kawase	Japan
Telling Lies in America		Guy Ferland	United States
Their Last Love Affair	지독한 사랑	Lee Myung-se	South Korea
They Call Me Joy	Ligaya ang Itawag Mo sa Akin	Carlos Siguion-Reyna	Philippines
Thirteen		David D. Williams	United States
Touch Me		H. Gordon Boos	United States
Touch Me Not	Μη μου άπτου	Dimitrios Yatzouzakis	Greece
Vertical Love	Amor vertical	Arturo Sotto Díaz	Cuba
We All Fall Down	Tutti giù per terra	Davide Ferrario	Italy
Western		Manuel Poirier	France
Winter Sleepers	Winterschläfer	Tom Tykwer	Germany
The Witman Boys	Witman fiúk	János Szász	Poland, France, Hungary
Wolves Cry Under the Moon	國道封閉	Ho Ping	Taiwan
Would I Lie to You?	La Vérité si je mens !	Thomas Gilou	France
Yours and Mine	我的神经病	Wang Shaudi	Taiwan

=== Discovery ===
English Title	Original Title	Director(s)	Production Country
Bandits		Katja von Garnier	Germany, France
Belly Up	Os Matadores	Beto Brant	Brazil
Clockwatchers		Jill Sprecher	United Kingdom, United States
First Love, Last Rites		Jesse Peretz	United States
Guilt Free	Libre de culpas	Marcel Sisniega Campbell	Mexico
The Impostor	El impostor	Alejandro Maci	Argentina
In Praise of Older Women	En brazos de la mujer madura	Manuel Lombardero	Spain
Life According to Muriel	La vida según Muriel	Eduardo Milewicz	Argentina
The Life of Stuff		Simon Donald	United Kingdom
Lover Girl		Lisa Addario, Joe Syracuse	United States
Marie from the Bay of Angels	Marie Baie des Anges	Manuel Pradal	France
Martha's Garden	Marthas Garten	Peter Liechti	Switzerland, Germany
Perfumed Ball	Baile Perfumado	Lírio Ferreira, Paulo Caldas	Brazil
Scars		James Herbert	United States
Somersault in a Coffin	Tabutta Rövaşata	Derviş Zaim	Turkey
The Sticky Fingers of Time		Hilary Brougher	United States
Stone, Scissors, Paper		Stephen Whittaker	United Kingdom
Traveler from the South	مسافر جنوب	Parviz Shahbazi	Iran
TwentyFourSeven		Shane Meadows	United Kingdom
Under the Skin		Carine Adler	United Kingdom
Unmade Beds		Nicholas Barker	France, United Kingdom, United States
Who the Hell Is Juliette?	¿Quién diablos es Juliette?	Carlos Marcovich	Mexico
Words of Wisdom		Susanna Fogel	United States

=== Planet Africa ===
English Title	Original Title	Director(s)	Production Country
Breeze		Barbara Sanon	United States
Buud Yam		Gaston Kaboré	Burkina Faso
Dancehall Queen		Don Letts, Rick Elgood	Jamaica
Destiny	المصير	Youssef Chahine	France, Egypt
The Draughtsmen Clash	Le Damier - Papa National Oyé !	Balufu Bakupa-Kanyinda	France, Democratic Republic of the Congo, Gabon
Fools		Ramadan Suleman	South Africa, France
Hav Plenty		Christopher Scott Cherot	United States
Honey and Ashes	Miel et cendres	Nadia Fares	Tunisia, Switzerland, Germany
Martin Luther King: Days of Hope		John Akomfrah	United Kingdom
Mossane		Safi Faye	Germany, Senegal
Sabriya		Abderrahmane Sissako	Tunisia
Skirt Power	Taafé Fanga	Adama Drabo	France, Germany, Mali
Through the Door of No Return		Shirikiana Aina	United States
To Be a Black Man		Nelson George	United States

=== Real to Reel ===
English Title	Original Title	Director(s)	Production Country
Best Man: 'Best Boy' and All of Us Twenty Years Later		Ira Wohl	United States
Chile, Obstinate Memory	Chile, la memoria obstinada	Patricio Guzmán	Chile, France, Canada
HHH - Un portrait de Hou Hsiao-Hsien		Olivier Assayas	France
Didn't Do It for Love		Monika Treut	Germany
Exile in Sarajevo		Tahir Cambis, Alma Sahbaz	Australia
Exile Shanghai		Ulrike Ottinger	Germany
From Son to Salsa	De Cuba Traigo un Son	Rigoberto López	Cuba
Full Tilt Boogie		Sarah Kelly	United States
Marcello Mastroianni: I Remember	Marcello Mastroianni: mi ricordo, sì, io mi ricordo	Anna Maria Tatò	Italy, France
My House Is on Fire		Ariel Dorfman, Rodrigo Dorfman	Chile, United States
As Time Goes By	去日苦多	Ann Hui, Vincent Chui	Hong Kong
Still Love You After All These	念你如昔	Stanley Kwan	Hong Kong
Robinson in Space		Patrick Keiller	United Kingdom

=== Dialogues: Talking with Pictures ===
English Title	Original Title	Director(s)	Presenter
Detour		Edgar G. Ulmer	Errol Morris
The Devil-Doll		Tod Browning	Guy Maddin
Dont Look Back		D. A. Pennebaker	Chris Hegedus
F for Fake		Orson Welles	James Toback
The Fireman's Ball	Hoří, má panenko	Miloš Forman	Friðrik Þór Friðriksson
Les Girls		George Cukor	Jaime Humberto Hermosillo
One Flew Over The Cuckoo's Nest		Miloš Forman	Chow Yun-fat
The Organizer	I compagni	Mario Monicelli	John Sayles
A Matter of Life and Death		Michael Powell, Emeric Pressburger	Sally Potter

=== Balkan Cinema: Home Truths ===
English Title	Original Title	Director(s)	Production Country
Across the Lake	Преку езерото	Antonio Mitrikeski	North Macedonia, Poland
The Awkward Age	Magareće godine	Nenad Dizdarević	Bosnia and Herzegovina, France
Belated Full Moon	Закъсняло пълнолуние	Eduard Zahariev	Bulgaria
The Days on Earth Are Flowing	Zemaljski dani teku	Goran Paskaljević	Yugoslavia (SR Serbia)
The End of the War	Kraj rata	Dragan Kresoja	Yugoslavia (SR Serbia)
An Unforgettable Summer	O vară de neuitat	Lucian Pintilie	Romania, France
Felix		Božo Šprajc	Croatia
The Goat Horn	Козият рог	Metodi Andonov	Bulgaria
How the War Started on My Island	Kako je počeo rat na mom otoku	Vinko Brešan	Croatia
The Perfect Circle	Savršeni krug	Ademir Kenović	Bosnia and Herzegovina
Petria's Wreath	Петријин венац	Srđan Karanović	Yugoslavia (SR Serbia)
Pretty Village, Pretty Flame	Лепа села лепо горе	Srđan Dragojević	Yugoslavia (FR Serbia)
Thalassa, Thalassa		Bogdan Dumitrescu	Germany, Romania
Tired Companions	Müde Weggefährten	Zoran Solomun	Germany
Tito and Me	Tito i ja	Goran Marković	Yugoslavia (SR Serbia)
Underground	Подземље	Emir Kusturica	Yugoslavia (FR Serbia), France, Germany, Hungary, Czech Republic, Bulgaria
Vukovar Poste Restante	Вуковар, једна прича	Boro Drašković	Yugoslavia (FR Serbia)
Who's Singin' Over There?	Ко то тамо пева	Slobodan Šijan	Yugoslavia (SR Serbia)
W.R.: Mysteries of the Organism	W.R. - Misterije organizma	Dušan Makavejev	Yugoslavia (SR Serbia), West Germany

=== Spotlight: Benoît Jacquot ===
English Title	Original Title	Director(s)	Production Country
The Musician Killer	L'Assassin musicien	Benoît Jacquot	France
Corps et biens		Benoît Jacquot	France
The Disenchanted	La Désenchantée	Benoît Jacquot	France
A Single Girl	La Fille seule	Benoît Jacquot	France
Marianne	La Vie de Marianne	Benoît Jacquot	France
Seventh Heaven	Le Septième Ciel	Benoît Jacquot	France

=== Nathan Phillips Square Outdoor Screening ===
English title	Original title	Director(s)	Production country
Gentlemen Prefer Blondes		Howard Hawks	United States

=== Midnight Madness ===
English Title	Original Title	Director(s)	Production Country
A Chinese Ghost Story: The Tsui Hark Animation	小倩	Andrew Chan	Hong Kong, Japan
Fudoh: The New Generation	極道戦国志 不動	Takashi Miike	Japan
I Married a Strange Person!		Bill Plympton	United States
Love God		Frank Grow	United States
Office Killer		Cindy Sherman	United States
Orgazmo		Trey Parker	United States
SICK: The Life & Death of Bob Flanagan, Supermasochist		Kirby Dick	United States
The Ugly		Scott Reynolds	New Zealand
