= Derby Crazy Love =

- Film poster
- Directed by: Maya Gallus, Justine Pimlott
- Written by: Maya Gallus
- Produced by: Justine Pimlott, Maya Gallus
- Starring: Smack Daddy; Suzy Hotrod; Raw Heidi; Bonnie Thunders; Plastik Patrik; Iron Wench; Georgia W Tush; Kamikaze Kitten; Lil Mama; Jess Bandit; Trash n’ Smash; Mange Moi El Cul; Apocalipstick; The Rev; Ewan Wotarmy
- Cinematography: Katerine Giguère, Nathalie Lasselin
- Edited by: Dave Kazala
- Music by: Keir Brownstone
- Production company: Red Queen Productions
- Distributed by: Red Queen Productions and Women Make Movies
- Release date: November 14, 2013 (Canada-Montreal International Documentary Festival)
- Running time: 64 minutes
- Country: Canada
- Language: English

Derby Crazy Love is a Canadian documentary film directed by Maya Gallus and Justine Pimlott of Red Queen Productions, and distributed by Women Make Movies. The film explores flat track roller derby, and its third-wave feminist empowerment. It was initially released on November 14, 2013, at the Montreal International Documentary Festival.

== Synopsis ==
Derby Crazy Love explores the evolution of the reemerging flat track roller derby, with a focus on its international sisterhood. There are over 100 leagues in Canada and 1,400 worldwide. Maya Gallus, one of the co-creators, explains, "[Derby is] female-dominated and player-owned and -operated, which already distinguishes it from any other sport." As the film begins, Montreal Roller Derby’s New Skids on the Block rematch against the UK’s London Rollergirls for a shot at the international WFTDA Championships, and New York City’s Gotham Girls Roller Derby (which includes derby superstars Suzy Hotrod and Bonnie Thunders) defends their title. This film captures how roller derby is part of punk’s counterculture, which tackles issues of masculinity, femininity, aggression, body image, queer identity, and gender norms. Each team consists of athletes with these various identities that have found a team where they belong. Gallus states, "Nobody’s making a big feminist point or a queer statement, [derby] just is inclusive." The sport is also a healthy outlet for of aggression, which is often denied to women. Montreal's team leader, Smack Daddy, summarizes the spirit of derby: "The fact that you’re combining roller skating, which is like, ‘let’s hold hands and go to the roller-rink,’ with chicks beating on each other physically is like, fireworks."

== Production ==
The film features music by Montreal’s Plastik Patrik et les Brutes, Lesbians on Ecstasy, and New York’s Kissy Kamikaze.

== Awards ==
- 2014: Bay Street Film Festival, People’s Choice Award
- 2015: Sheffield Adventure Film Festival Best Women in Adventure Film, Bronze
- 2015: Sheffield Adventure Film Festival, Special Jury Citation, Best Film
- 2015: Sheffield Adventure Film Festival Best Soundtrack, Gold

== Festivals ==
- Sheffield Adventure Film Festival
- Sheffield Doc/Fest
- RIDM Montreal Documentary Festival
- Frameline International LGBT Film Festival (Frameline Film Festival)
- Inside Out Toronto LGBT Film Festival (Inside Out Film and Video Festival)
- Qdocs Portland
- Northside Film Festival
- This Human World Human Rights Festival Vienna
- Salem Film Festival
- DOXA Documentary Film Festival
- Women Make Waves, Taiwan
- SEOUL International Women's Film Festival, Korea
- Mardi Gras Film Festival
- Melbourne Queer Film Festival
- Fairy Tales International Queer Film Festival (Fairy Tales International Gay & Lesbian Film Festival
- Bay Street Film Festival
- Salt Spring Island Film Festival
- Hamburg International Queer Film Festival
- Festival International du Film Lesbien Feminist, Paris
- Fringe Queer Film & Arts Fest, London, UK
- Dallas Video Festival
- Outburst Queer Arts Festival Belfast
- Mezipatra Queer Film Festival, Czech
- London Lesbian and Gay Film Festival, UK

== Broadcasts ==
Global TV (Canada)

== Reviews ==
- "Falling in crazy love with derby…" Daily Xtra
- "Derby Crazy Love takes us to the heart of one of the last decade’s most thrilling sporting phenomena." Point of View
- "There is now a definitive roller derby doc." Cult Montreal
- "Derby Crazy Love goes straight to the heart of the emerging roller derby phenomenon, a vibrant and fun expression of feminist physicality…" The Rover
- "You’d be wise to expect the unexpected." She Does The City
- "Derby Crazy Love is an inspiration. From the first frame it’s as intoxicating as the star players." Row Three
