= Mazo de la Roche =

Canadian writer (1879–1961)

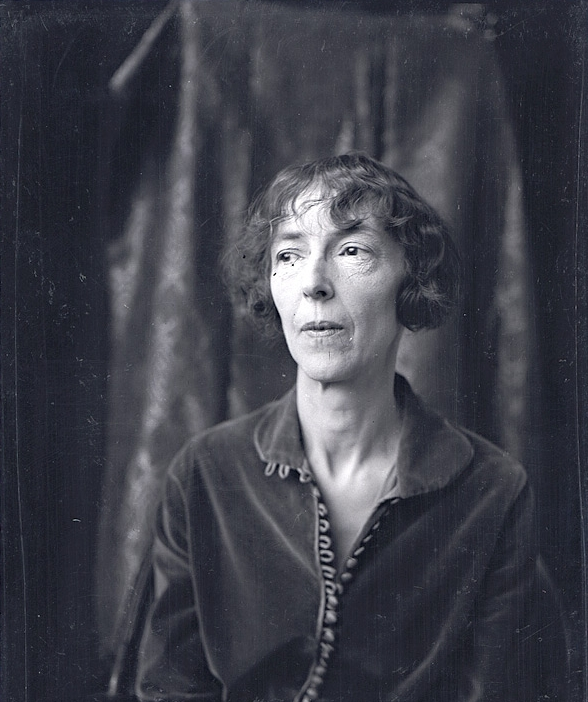
- Mazo de la Roche, December 18, 1927
- Born: Maisie Roche; January 15, 1879; Newmarket, Ontario, Canada
- Died: July 12, 1961 (aged 82); Toronto, Ontario, Canada
- Partner: Caroline Clement
- Parents: William Richmond Roche; Alberta Louise Lundy

Mazo de la Roche (/də lə ˈrɒʃ/; born Maisie Louise Roche; January 15, 1879 – July 12, 1961) was a Canadian writer who wrote the Jalna novels, one of the most popular series of books of her time.

== Biography ==
=== Early life ===
Mazo de la Roche, in Clarkson 1928

De la Roche was born in Newmarket, Ontario, north of Toronto, on January 15, 1879. She was the only child of William Roche, a salesman, and Alberta (Lundy) Roche, who was a great-great-niece of David Willson, founder of the Children of Peace, through the latter's elder half-brother Hugh L. Willson. On her father's side of the family, her uncle Francis signed himself as "Francis J. de la Roche", claiming a descendancy from Sir Richard de la Roche (1199–1283) of Strongbow's army; Mazo eventually adopted the "de la Roche" surname, claiming that it was a nod to French heritage.

The Roche family moved frequently throughout Southern Ontario during her childhood because of her mother's ill health and her father's work as a travelling salesman. She lived successively in Newmarket (1879–1885), at least two separate addresses in Toronto (1885–1888), several dwellings in Orillia (1888–1991), Galt (1891–1892), Orillia (again, 1892–1894) and Toronto (again, 1894–1900). She was a lonely child who became an avid reader and developed her own fictional world, "The Play," in which she created imaginary scenes and characters. One of the family's moves meant some years on a farm owned by a wealthy man who farmed as a hobby. There de la Roche began to develop her fictional world of rural aristocracy that—years later—became Jalna.

When de la Roche was seven, her parents adopted her orphaned eight-year-old cousin Caroline Clement, who joined in Mazo's fantasy world game and became her lifelong companion. De la Roche wrote her first short story at age 9. She attended high school at Jameson Collegiate (now Parkdale Collegiate Institute) in west end Toronto, and later studied at the Metropolitan School of Music, the University of Toronto, and the Ontario School of Art, all in Toronto.

=== Early writing career ===
De la Roche, then 23, had her first story published in 1902 in Munsey's Magazine, but very shortly thereafter (in February 1903) she suffered a mental breakdown. For the next several years, she suffered from depression and insomnia, and did not write.

In 1905, Roche and Caroline moved with Mazo's parents to Acton, Ontario to operate the Acton House hotel. She was known locally as "Maisie Roach", and lived there until 1908, selling one of her stories while she was there. Her novel Delight was based on her time there, and Acton's geography figures notably in Possession. A few years later in 1911, by now in her early thirties, de la Roche moved with Caroline and the Roches to Sovereign House in Bronte, Ontario, to try life as farm owners. By now, de la Roche had resumed writing and was placing stories in American magazines on an occasional basis.

William Roche, Mazo's father, died in 1915 of cirrhosis of the liver brought on by alcoholism. De la Roche, her mother Alberta and Caroline moved back to Toronto.

De la Roche continued to write, but at this juncture Caroline Clement was the main breadwinner of the household, working as a civil service clerk. (She eventually rose to become the province of Ontario's chief statistician.) During the summers, Clement lived in a Toronto boarding house while de la Roche and her mother stayed in a cottage near Lake Simcoe, several hours north of the city.

Alberta Roche died in 1920. After this, de la Roche's writing career began in earnest, and Clement and de la Roche were never again separated for any significant length of time. During most of the 1920s, they split their time between Toronto and a cottage they had built in Clarkson, Ontario.

Her first published book, Explorers of the Dawn, appeared in 1922, and was a fix-up of some previously published sketches, vignettes and stories rewritten to work within an overarching narrative framework. Her first two proper novels, Possession (1923) and Delight (1926), were romantic novels which were mild successes, but nevertheless earned her little in income or recognition. De la Roche also wrote plays and short stories through this period.

Her third novel, Jalna, was submitted to the American magazine Atlantic Monthly, where it won a $10,000 award. The award, and the novel's publication in 1927, brought de la Roche fame and fortune at the age of 48.

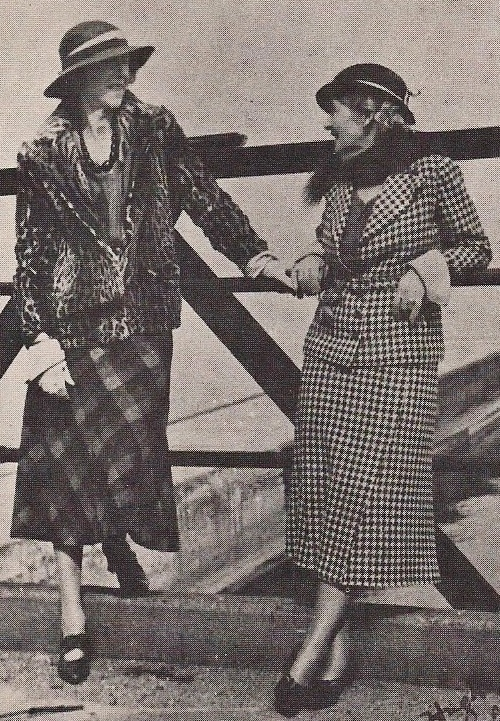
Benares Historic House and Bianca de la Roche. Mazo De La Roche & Caroline Clement, ca. 1930s

=== Jalna series ===
Jalna was an immediate sensation, with the public demanding sequels and prequels for the rest of de la Roche's life. Though she continued to write other works, the series known as the Jalna series or the Whiteoak Chronicles dominated the rest of her career. The series tells the story of one hundred years of the Whiteoak family from 1854 to 1954. The sixteen novels do not form a sequence, however, and each can be read as an independent story.

There are similarities and differences in the experiences of the Whiteoak family and that of de la Roche. While the lives and successes of the Whiteoaks rise and fall, there remained for them the steadiness of the family manor, known as Jalna. de la Roche's family endured the illness of her mother, the perpetual job searches of her father, and the adoption of her orphaned cousin while being moved 17 times. Several critics believe that Finch Whiteoak who majors in Finch's Fortune (1932) is a reflection of de la Roche herself. He was a somewhat tortured concert pianist with overtones of gayness. The names of many of the characters were taken from gravestones in a Newmarket, Ontario cemetery.

=== Bestselling author ===
The sudden bout of fame was not an immediate blessing for de la Roche, as the stress of the attendant publicity caused her to experience another breakdown in early 1928. She eventually recovered, and began writing a sequel to Jalna, which was published in 1929.

The income from Jalna and its sequels allowed de la Roche to become the main breadwinner of the household, after years of having been supported by Clement. The two made an extended trip to Europe beginning in 1929, living first in Italy, then in the United Kingdom. In 1931 they adopted the two orphaned children of friends of theirs. This was extremely unusual for the time, as adoptions by single women were technically not allowed in the UK during this era; the machinations by which de la Roche and Clement were able to do this are unknown.

The family returned to Toronto for a time in 1934–1935, heading back to England again in 1936 before returning to Toronto for good in 1939. She purchased a home at 3590 Bayview Avenue the same year, and eventually added two wings to what became a 17-room mansion. Originally built in 1922, it was de la Roche's home until 1945 when she and her family relocated to Forest Hill where it was easier to secure staff and get the children to and from school. During this era, de la Roche reliably published at least one book a year, sometimes more. However, although her early work had received positive critical notices, critical reaction to her newer works was often decidedly cool, in both North America and Europe. Nevertheless, the Jalna books were still strong sellers, with a wide and appreciative readership.

De la Roche's productivity slowed somewhat once she was in her sixties and seventies. Partly due to arthritis in her hands, much of her later work was dictated to Clement. She still published regularly right up to her death, with her final novel Morning at Jalna appearing in 1960 when she was 81.

=== Mazo and Caroline Clement ===
Overall, de la Roche and Caroline Clement lived a fairly reclusive life, and their relationship was not discussed widely in the press. In her infrequent interviews, de la Roche often expressed a need for privacy. Though there has been much speculation – without evidence – in recent years as to the exact nature of the relationship between de la Roche and Clement, de la Roche's autobiography makes no mention of them being anything other than close companions.

Not long after de la Roche's death in 1961, in accordance with her wishes, Clement burned almost all of the author's personal diaries. Clement died in 1972.

Most recently, de la Roche was the subject of a Red Queen Productions and National Film Board of Canada co-production, The Mystery of Mazo de la Roche, which premiered on March 17, 2012 at the Festival international du film sur l'art in Montreal, then had its Toronto premiere at Hot Docs, April 29, 2012. The film is directed by Maya Gallus, produced by Justine Pimlott and Anita Lee, and combines archival material with dramatic reenactments featuring Severn Thompson as Mazo de la Roche. The film "lend(s) credence to the theory that its subject was a closeted lesbian", although several people in the film who knew de la Roche and Clement, including their adopted daughter Esmée, state on-camera that they believe the relationship between the two was close but ultimately platonic.

=== Death and legacy ===
De la Roche died on July 12, 1961. She was buried at the St. George's Anglican Church cemetery, at Sibbald Point, near Sutton, Ontario. Her grave site is located near Canadian writer Stephen Leacock. Later, Caroline Clement was buried alongside her.

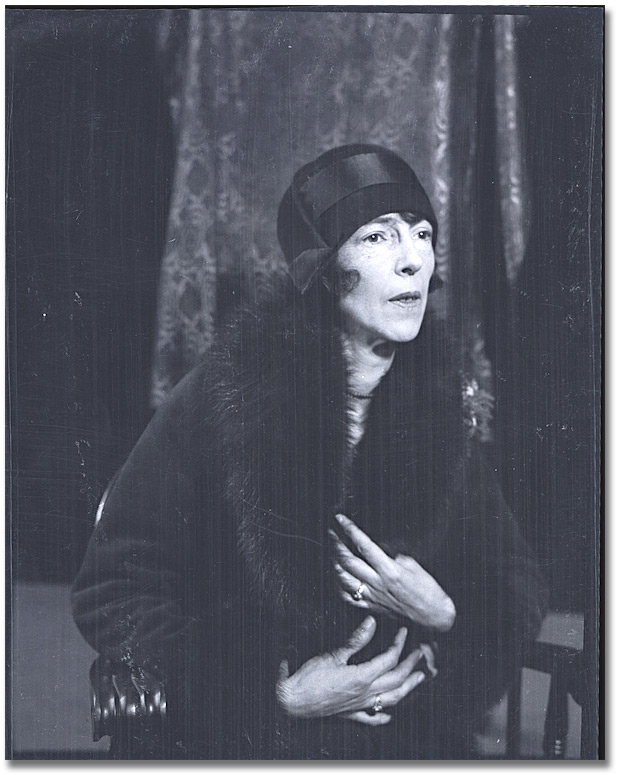
December, 1927

The Jalna series has sold more than eleven million copies in 193 English and 92 foreign editions. In 1935, the film Jalna, based on the novel, was released by RKO Radio Pictures and, in 1972, a CBC television series was produced based on the series, which actually used the historic Benares house as the principal filming location. This century-old Georgian revival home which is situated in Clarkson, Ontario, is believed to be the inspiration for Jalna, hence the reason for the name of this subdivision when the original large Benares estate was severed and sold off to residential developers in the late 1960s. (Benares and Jalna are in fact both names of Indian cities.) It is now maintained by the Museums of Mississauga. A nearby park is named Whiteoaks in honour of the series, as is a nearby elementary school. Streets in the area also bear names such as "Mazo Crescent," "Jalna Avenue," "Roche Court," and "Whiteoaks Avenue."

Her house at 3590 Bayview Avenue in Toronto, Ontario was bought by The Zoroastrian Society of Ontario in 1978 and continues to serve as the society's community centre (as of February 2021). It is listed as a City of Toronto Heritage Property.

In the 1970s, a land developer in London, Ontario used the characters from de la Roche's Jalna series to name streets for a new subdivision named White Oaks. Street names used from the Jalna series include: Jalna Boulevard, Ernest Avenue, Renny Crescent, Finch Crescent, Nicholas Crescent, Alayne Crescent, Archer Crescent, Piers Crescent, Meg Drive.

In 1990, a French-immersion public school in de la Roche's birthplace of Newmarket, Ontario was named in her honour.

Responding to an enquiry on the pronunciation of her name, her secretary told The Literary Digest: "Her Christian name is pronounced may'zo, and Roche is pronounced rosh, to rhyme with Foch."

== Works ==
=== Novels ===
The following table can be sorted to show Mazo de la Roche's novels in chronological order, or arranged alphabetically by title, by publisher, or by series.
| Year | Title | Publisher | Series | (Order) | Notes |
|---|---|---|---|---|---|
| 1922 | Explorers of the Dawn | Knopf | | | |
| 1923 | Possession | Macmillan | | | Reprinted, C. Chivers, 1973. |
| 1926 | Delight | Macmillan | | | Reprinted with introduction by Desmond Pacey, McClelland and Stewart, 1961 |
| 1927 | Jalna | Little, Brown | Jalna | 7 | |
| 1929 | Whiteoaks of Jalna | Little, Brown | Jalna | 8 | Also published as Whiteoaks, Macmillan, 1929 |
| 1930 | Portrait of a Dog | Little, Brown | | | Immortalizes the author's beloved Scottish Terrier |
| 1932 | Finch's Fortune | Little, Brown | Jalna | 9 | |
| 1932 | Lark Ascending | Little, Brown | | | |
| 1932 | The Thunder of the New Wings | Little, Brown | | | |
| 1933 | The Master of Jalna | Little, Brown | Jalna | 10 | |
| 1934 | Beside a Norman Tower | Little, Brown | | | |
| 1935 | Young Renny | Little, Brown | Jalna | 4 | |
| 1936 | Whiteoak Harvest | Little, Brown | Jalna | 11 | |
| 1937 | The Very Little House | Little, Brown | | | |
| 1938 | Growth of a Man | Little, Brown | | | |
| 1940 | Whiteoak Heritage | Little, Brown | Jalna | 5 | |
| 1941 | Wakefield's Course | Little, Brown | Jalna | 12 | |
| 1942 | The Two Saplings | Macmillan | | | |
| 1944 | Building of Jalna | Little, Brown | Jalna | 1 | |
| 1946 | Return to Jalna | Little, Brown | Jalna | 13 | |
| 1949 | Mary Wakefield | Little, Brown | Jalna | 3 | |
| 1951 | Renny's Daughter | Little, Brown | Jalna | 14 | |
| 1953 | Whiteoak Brothers | Little, Brown | Jalna | 6 | |
| 1954 | Variable Winds at Jalna | Little, Brown | Jalna | 15 | |
| 1955 | The Song of Lambert | Macmillan | | | Juvenile |
| 1958 | Centenary at Jalna | Little, Brown | Jalna | 16 | |
| 1958 | Bill and Coo | Macmillan | | | Juvenile |
| 1960 | Morning at Jalna | Little, Brown | Jalna | 2 | |

=== Plays ===
- Low Life: A Comedy in One Act (first produced as Low Life in Toronto, Ontario, at Trinity Memorial Hall, May 14, 1925), Macmillan, 1925.
- Come True (first produced in Toronto at Trinity Memorial Hall, May 16, 1927), Macmillan, 1927.
- The Return of the Emigrant (first produced in Toronto at Trinity Memorial Hall, March 12, 1928.) Collected in Low Life and Other Plays (contains Low Life, Come True, and The Return of the Emigrant), Little, Brown, 1929.
- (With Nancy Price) Whiteoaks: A Play (adapted from Whiteoaks of Jalna; first produced in London, England, at Little Theatre in the Adelphi, April 13, 1936; produced on Broadway, 1938), Macmillan, 1936.

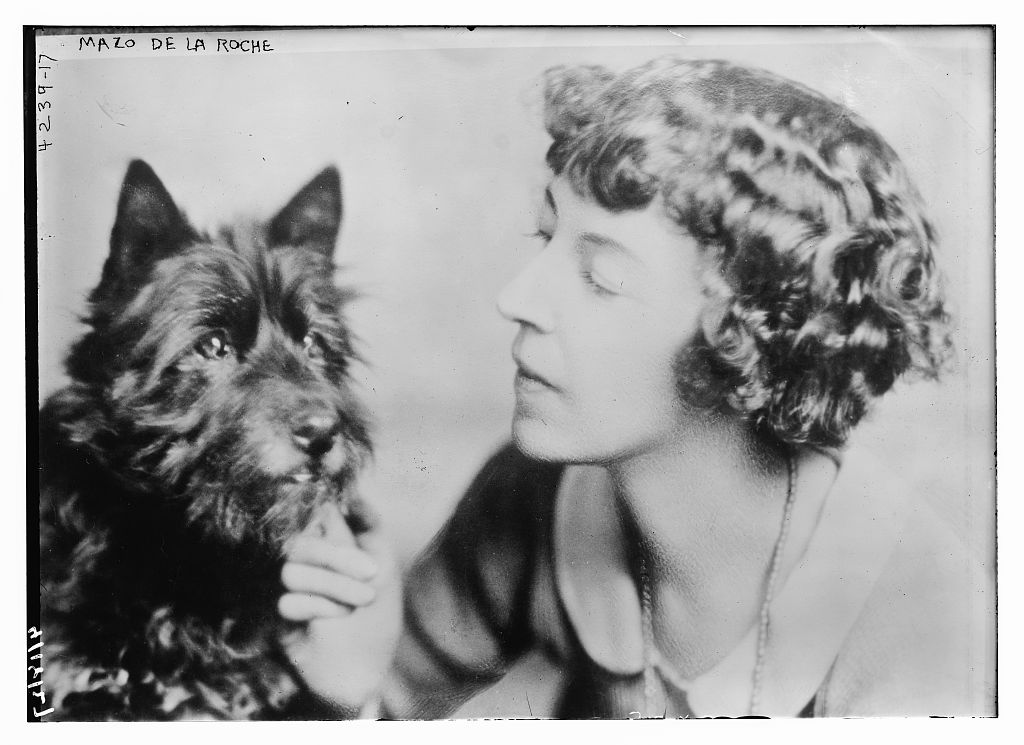
Bain News Service/LOC ggbain.24645. Mazo De La Roche

- Mistress of Jalna, first produced in Bromley, Kent, England, at New Theatre, November 12, 1951.

=== Short story collections ===
- The Sacred Bullock and Other Stories of Animals, Little, Brown, 1939.
- A Boy in the House, and Other Stories, Little, Brown, 1952.
- Selected Stories of Mazo de la Roche, edited and introduced by Douglas Daymond, University of Ottawa Press, 1979. ISBN 2-7603-4340-5

=== Non-fiction ===
- Quebec: Historic Seaport (non-fiction), Doubleday, 1944.
- Ringing the Changes: An Autobiography, Little, Brown, 1957.
- (Author of introduction) George F. Nelson, editor, Northern Lights: A New Collection of Distinguished Writing by Canadian Authors, Doubleday, 1960.

=== Related works ===
- Jalna 1935 film based on the novel. IMDb
- The Whiteoaks of Jalna 1972 CBC TV series based on the Jalna series. IMDb

== See also ==
- Lorne Pierce Medal
