= Justine Pimlott =

Canadian film director

- Occupation: Filmmaker

Justine Pimlott is a Canadian documentary filmmaker, and co-founder of Red Queen Productions with Maya Gallus. She began her career apprenticing as a sound recordist with Studio D, the women’s studio at the National Film Board of Canada (NFB), in Montreal. As a documentary filmmaker, her work has won numerous awards, including Best Social Issue Documentary at Hot Docs Canadian International Documentary Festival and Best Canadian Film at Inside Out Film and Video Festival for Laugh in the Dark, which critic Thomas Waugh described, in The Romance of Transgression in Canada as "one of the most effective and affecting elegies in Canadian queer cinema." Her films have screened internationally at Sheffield Doc/Fest, SEOUL International Women’s Film Festival, Women Make Waves (Taiwan), This Human World Film Festival (Vienna), Singapore International Film Festival, among others, and have been broadcast around the world.

She has also served as chair of the board and programmer for Inside Out, former board member for DOC Toronto, and, in 1982, founded Film Furies, the first international women’s film festival in Winnipeg. In 2014, she returned to the NFB, as a producer with its Ontario Studio in Toronto. Her producorial credits with the NFB include a 2017 co-production with Intervention Productions, A Better Man, as well as the 2024 co-productions, Any Other Way: The Jackie Shane Story, with Banger Films, and A Mother Apart, with Oya Media Group.

== Filmography ==
- 2000 - Laugh in the Dark (producer/director/writer)
- 2002 - Chasing the Dream (director)
- 2005 - Fag Hags: Women Who Love Gay Men (director)
- 2007 - Girl Inside (producer)
- 2007 - Punch like a Girl (producer/co-director)
- 2008 - Cat City (director)
- 2010 - Dish: Women, Waitressing & the Art of Service (producer)
- 2012 - The Mystery of Mazo de la Roche (producer)
- 2013 - Derby Crazy Love (producer/co-director)
- 2015 - Sculpting Memory - Atom Egoyan (producer)
- 2017 - Portrait of a Family (Legacies 150) (producer)
- 2017 - Who is The Real Martin Short (producer)
- 2017 - A Better Man (producer)
- 2018 - The Haunts of Murray McLauchlan (producer)
- 2018 - What Walaa Wants (producer)
- 2019 - Woman Dress (producer)
- 2019 - The Bassinet (producer)
- 2019 - Hand Made Mountain (producer)
- 2019 - The Hook Up (producer)
- 2019 - Reviving the Roost (producer)
- 2019 - Camera Test (Five Feminist Minutes) (producer)
- 2019 - The Afterlifetime of Colm Feore (producer)
- 2020 - Nbissiing (producer)
- 2020 - Have You Eaten (producer)
- 2020 - Borealis (producer)
- 2020 - Inconvenient Indian (producer)
- 2023 - Boat People (producer)
- 2024 - Any Other Way: The Jackie Shane Story (producer)
- 2024 - A Mother Apart (producer)
- 2025 - Parade: Queer Acts of Love and Resistance (producer)

== Awards and nominations ==
Hot Docs

- 2000: Best Social Issue Documentary: Laugh in the Dark (Award)

Inside Out Film and Video Festival

- 2000: Best Canadian Film: Laugh in the Dark (Award)

M. Joan Chalmers Documentarian Award – Ontario Arts Council

- 2000: Laugh in the Dark (Shortlisted)

In December 2025, she was named the recipient of the Documentary Organization of Canada's annual Luminary Award for Canadian documentary filmmaking.

For additional awards - see Red Queen Productions
