= Unmade Beds =

Unmade Beds may refer to:

- Unmade Beds (1976 film), an early New York New Wave/No Wave film directed by Amos Poe, with Debbie Harry and Robert Gordon
- Unmade Beds (1997 film), a British art house film directed by Nicholas Barker
- Unmade Beds (2009 film), a British comedy-drama film directed by Alexis Dos Santos
