= Sabry =

Sabry is a surname. Notable people with the surname include:

- Mohammed al-Sabry, Yemeni politician and an opposition leader
- Sabry Mohammed, held in the United States' Guantanamo Bay detention camps since January 2002
- Hassan Sabry Pasha (1879–1940), Egyptian politician who briefly served as prime minister of Egypt in 1940
- Sherif Sabry Pasha, brother of Nazli Sabri, Queen consort of Egypt
- Sabry Raheel (born 1987), Egyptian footballer
- Abdel Sattar Sabry (born 1974), Egyptian retired footballer
- Adham Sabry the main character in Ragol Al Mostaheel series by Nabil Farouk
- Ahmed Sabry (fencer) (1933–1958), Egyptian fencing champion
- Ali Sabry, former Egyptian minister of military production
- Ali Sabry, Sri Lankan lawyer and politician
- Hend Sabry (born 1979), Tunisian actress
- Ibrahim Sabry, Egyptian archer who participated at the 2010 Summer Youth Olympics
- Maher Sabry, Egyptian theatre director, playwright, film director, producer and screenwriter, poet, writer and cartoonist
- Mazen Hesham Ga Sabry (born 1994), professional squash player who represented Egypt
- Mohanad Saif El Din Sabry (born 1980), Egyptian fencer
- Rami Sabry (born 1978), Egyptian singer
- Samir Sabry (born 1976), Egyptian former footballer
- Sherif Sabry (tennis) (born 1986), Egyptian tennis player
- Mohamed Sabry Soliman (born 1979), Egyptian suspect in the 2025 Boulder fire attack

== See also ==
- Sabariya
- Sabriya
