= Under the Weather =

Under the Weather may refer to:

- "Under the Weather" (song), a 2005 song by KT Tunstall
- "Under the Weather" (short story), a 2011 short story by Stephen King
- Under the Weather (1997 film), a Canadian animated short movie
- Under the Weather (2020 film), a Canadian drama film
- "Under the Weather", a song by Feeder from Echo Park, 2001

== See also ==
- Malaise, a vague, generalized feeling of being sick
- Disease, sickness or illness
