= Elizabeth Yake =

Canadian film producer

Elizabeth Yake is a Canadian film producer, who is the founder and president of True West Films. She is most noted for the films Everything's Gone Green and It's All Gone Pete Tong, the latter of which won the Toronto International Film Festival Award for Best Canadian Film in 2004 and was a Genie Award nominee for Canadian Screen Award for Best Motion Picture at the 26th Genie Awards in 2006.

Recent productions include Canadian digital series The Drop, which premiered via Narcity Canada's YouTube in 2023.

== Education ==
Yake was educated at the University of Guelph, Ryerson University and Regent's University London. She has also studied at the Canadian Film Centre.

== Career ==
Yake's dramatic films include The Feeler, Shoemaker, Desire, Mile Zero, Miss Texas, It's All Gone Pete Tong and Everything's Gone Green. Her documentaries include Hadwin's Judgement, Jeff Wall: In Order to Make a Picture, bp: pushing the boundaries, The Dragon's Egg, Mémoire Moire des souvenirs and Out of the Woods.

She was nominated for the Donald Brittain Award in 1999 for The Dragon's Egg.

In 2005 she won the Leo Award, Best Feature Length Drama for It's All Gone Pete Tong and again in 2007 for Everything's Gone Green.

It's All Gone Pete Tong was voted by Playback one of the ten best films of the 2000s, was nominated for Best Achievement in Production Award at the British Independent Film Awards, Best Actor and Best Feature at the HBO US Comedy Festival (Aspen), winner of the Audience Award and Best Feature Award at the Gen Arts Film Festival in New York.

== Awards and nominations ==
- 2016, Nominated for Canadian Screen Award for Ted Rogers Best Feature Length Documentary for Hadwin's Judgement
- 2015, Won Sharon Gibbon Award from Vancouver Women in Film & Television Spotlight Awards
