= Alberta Watson =

Canadian actress (1955–2015)

- Alberta Watson on 24
- Born: Faith Susan Alberta Watson; March 6, 1955; Toronto, Ontario, Canada
- Died: March 21, 2015 (aged 60); Toronto, Ontario, Canada
- Occupation: Actress
- Years active: 1975–2012
- Spouse: Ken Sedgwick

Faith Susan Alberta Watson (March 6, 1955 – March 21, 2015) was a Canadian film and television actress. She was known for her roles as Dr. Rebecca Meyer on Buck James (1987-88), Madeline on La Femme Nikita (1997-2001) and Erin Driscoll on 24 (2004-05).

Watson was a Gemini Award (out of five total nominations) and a two-time Genie Award nominee (Best Supporting Actress, 1978, for In Praise of Older Women; Best Actress, 1997, for Shoemaker). She also shared the National Board of Review Award for Best Cast with the ensemble of Atom Egoyan's The Sweet Hereafter (1997).

== Early life ==
Watson was born in Toronto, Ontario, in 1955. She grew up in Toronto with her mother Grace, a factory worker, and her brother. She began performing with a local Toronto theatre group, T.H.O.G. (Theatre House of God), of the Bathurst Street United Church, at age 15.

Watson took a workshop for the Hair musical. While at the workshop she acted in Hamlet, which was directed by René Bonnière, who later directed her in La Femme Nikita.

== Career ==
Watson got her first role at age 19 in a CBC movie called Honor Thy Father. Early in her career she portrayed the role of Mitzi in George Kaczender's In Praise of Older Women (1978), for which she received a Genie nomination for Best Supporting Actress. A year later she received the Best Actress award at the Yorkton Film Festival for "Exposure". She moved to Los Angeles, California, and later to New York City.

Watson lived in New Jersey for eight years with her husband until they divorced. She then returned to Toronto and focused on finding roles in independent films. She worked with director Colleen Murphy on the film Shoemaker (1996), for which she received a second Genie nomination for Best Actress.

Among her well-known film roles are the bed-ridden mother Susan Aibelli in the 1994 American independent film Spanking the Monkey, Lauren Murphy (the mother of Jonny Lee Miller's character Dade, also called "Crash Override"/"Zero Cool") in the 1995 cult film Hackers, and Risa in the 1997 Academy Award-nominated Canadian film The Sweet Hereafter, directed by Atom Egoyan.

In Spanking the Monkey, Watson plays her favourite character, a mother who has an incestuous relationship with her son. The role was turned down by several actresses such as Susan Sarandon, Jessica Lange and others. Watson said:

I took it because it was a heck of a challenge. And I'm not a name with an image to protect. The subject was incest. It didn't scare me at all. I seized the character and made her something. She was a deeply disturbed woman with a roller coaster of emotions. Her son visits for the summer and she's laid up in a cast with a broken leg and things get out of hand.

She played the role of Madeline in La Femme Nikita for four seasons from 1997 to 2001 (with guest appearances in the short fifth season). During the show's second season (in 1998), Watson was diagnosed with lymphoma, for which she had to undergo chemotherapy treatment which caused her to lose her hair. Producers at La Femme Nikita worked around her treatment and limited her appearances. Watson wore wigs in the show when she lost her hair. When her hair started to regrow, she sported the short haircut in her role as Madeline in the show's third season.

Watson's first name inspired the character Alberta Green in the first season of 24. In 2005, Watson joined the cast of 24, playing CTU Director Erin Driscoll for 12 episodes of the show's fourth season.

During 2007 and 2008, Watson played a supporting role in the Canadian television series The Border as the Minister of Public Safety.

In 2010, Watson guest-starred in Heartland, a series on CBC Television, and she won a 2011 Gemini Award for her portrayal of Sarah Craven.

In a nod to her La Femme Nikita role, Alberta played a recurring character Madeline Pierce in Nikita, the CW's 2010–2013 reboot of the film and TV series.

== Death ==
Watson died on March 21, 2015, due to complications from cancer at Kensington Hospice in Toronto, 15 days after her 60th birthday.

== Filmography ==
=== Film ===
Year	Title	Role	Notes
1978	In Praise of Older Women	Mitzi	
1978	Power Play	Donna	
1979	Exposure	Barbara	Short film
1979	Stone Cold Dead	Olivia Page	
1980	Virus	Litha	
1981	Dirty Tricks	Tony	
1981	Black Mirror	Tina	
1982	The Soldier	Susan Goodman	
1983	The Keep	Eva Cuza	
1984	Best Revenge	Dinah	
1987	White of the Eye	Ann Mason	
1989	Destiny to Order	Thalia / Marla / Nicole	
1991	The Hitman	Christine De Vera	
1992	Zebrahead	Phyliss	
1994	Spanking the Monkey	Susan Aibelli	
1995	What's His Face	Woman	Short film
1995	Hackers	Lauren Murphy	
1996	Shoemaker	Anna	
1996	Sweet Angel Mine	Megan	
1997	The Sweet Hereafter	Risa	
1998	Seeds of Doubt	Jennifer Kingsley	
1999	The Life Before This	Nita	
2000	Desire	Simone	
2000	Deeply	Fiona	
2001	Hedwig and the Angry Inch	Hansel's Mom	
2001	Chasing Cain	Denise McGoogan	
2001	Tart	Lily Storm	
2001	The Art of Woo	Caterin	
2002	The Wild Dogs	Natalie	
2004	The Prince and Me	Amy Morgan	
2004	My Brother's Keeper	Helen Woods	
2004	Vendetta: No Conscience, No Mercy	Anne Phelan	
2004	Some Things That Stay	Liz Anderson	
2006	Citizen Duane	Bonnie Balfour	
2006	Away from Her	Dr. Fischer	
2006	A Lobster Tale	Martha Brewer	
2007	The Lookout	Barbara Pratt	
2008	Growing Op	Marilla	
2009	Helen	Dr. Sherman	
2009	The Spine	Mary Rutherford	Short film

=== Television ===
Year	Title	Role	Notes
1980	King of Kensington	Mitzi	Episode: "War and Peace"
1980	War Brides	Norma	TV film
1983	I Am a Hotel	Suzanne	TV short
1984	Hill Street Blues	Prostitute	Episode: "Fuched Again"
1984	Deadly Nightmares	Jill Friedlander	Episode: "Remembering Melody"
1985	Murder in Space	Dominica Mastrelli	TV film
1985	The Equalizer	Carla Holden	Episode: "The Distant Fire"
1985	Kane & Abel	Zofia Rosnovski	TV miniseries
1986	Fortune Dane	Amy Steiner	Pilot episode
1986	Women of Valor	Lt. Helen Prescott	TV film
1987	Street Legal	Mercedes Puentes	Episode: "Tango Bellarosa"
1987–88	Buck James	Dr. Rebecca Meyer	Main role (19 episodes)
1989	The Equalizer	Taffy Gould	Episode: "The Caper"
1989	Shannon's Deal	Terry Lomax	TV film
1989	Street Legal	Maria Lopez	Episode: "Partners and Other Strangers"
1990	Island Son	Nina Delaney	Episode: "Separations"
1990	Grand	Andrea	Episode: "The Return of Yale Pinhaus"
1991	Law & Order	Miss Hanley	Episode: "His Hour Upon the Stage"
1992	Law & Order	Angela Brandt	Episode: "Skin Deep"
1993	Relentless: Mind of a Killer	Ellen Giancola	TV film
1993	Matrix	Marie Sands	Episode: "Conviction of His Courage"
1994	Jonathan Stone: Threat of Innocence	Deborah Walsh Bradford	TV film
1995	The Outer Limits	Lynda Tillman	Episode: "If These Walls Could Talk"
1995	A Child Is Missing	Agent Lynette Graham	TV film
1996	Giant Mine	Peggy Witte	TV film
1996	Gotti	Victoria Gotti	TV film
1997–2001	La Femme Nikita	Madeline	Main role (89 episodes); Nominated - Gemini Award for Best Performance by an Actress in a Featured Supporting Role in a Dramatic Series
1998	The Girl Next Door	Mary Bradley	TV film
2000	Soul Food	Judge Olivia Delaney	Episode: "The More Things Stay the Same"
2001	After the Harvest	Amelia Gare	TV film
2002	Guilt by Association	Angie	TV film
2002	Chasing Cain: Face	Det. Denise McGoogan	TV film
2003	The Risen	Amanda Knowles	TV film
2003	Penguins Behind Bars	Babs (voice)	TV film
2003	Missing	Mrs. Mastriani	Episode: "Pilot"
2003	Choice: The Henry Morgentaler Story	Chava Rosenfarb-Morgentaler	TV film
2004	Puppets Who Kill	Judge	Episode: "Bill Sues"
2004	The Newsroom	Susan	Recurring role (4 episodes)
2004	Show Me Yours	Toni Bane	Recurring role (8 episodes)
2004–05	24	Erin Driscoll	Regular role (13 episodes)
2005	Million Dollar Murder	Ted's Lawyer	TV film
2006	At the Hotel	Camille	Recurring role (4 episodes)
2006	Angela's Eyes	Lydia Anderson	Recurring role (6 episodes)
2008	The Border	Minister Suzanne Fleischer	Recurring role (10 episodes)
2010	Heartland	Sarah Craven	Episode: "Where the Truth Lies"
2011–12	Nikita	Senator Madeline Pierce	Recurring role (9 episodes)

== Bibliography ==
- Heyn, Christopher. "A Conversation with Alberta Watson". Inside Section One: Creating and Producing TV's La Femme Nikita. Introduction by Peta Wilson. Los Angeles: Persistence of Vision Press, 2006. pp. 88–93. ISBN 0-9787625-0-9. In-depth conversation with Alberta Watson about her role as Madeline on La Femme Nikita, as well as her more recent acting experiences.
