= Irreplaceable You =

- Film poster
- Directed by: Stephanie Laing
- Written by: Bess Wohl
- Produced by: Farah Abushwesha; Christie Colliopoulos; Matt Kaplan; Buzz Koenig; Jonathan Tropper
- Starring: Gugu Mbatha-Raw; Michiel Huisman; Brian Tyree Henry; Steve Coogan; Timothy Simons; Jacki Weaver; Kate McKinnon; Christopher Walken; Tamara Tunie
- Cinematography: Magdalena Górka
- Music by: Lesley Barber
- Production companies: ACE; Tropper Ink Productions; Rocliffe Productions; PYPO; Opposite Field Pictures; The Exchange
- Distributed by: Netflix
- Release date: February 16, 2018
- Running time: 96 minutes
- Country: United States
- Language: English

Irreplaceable You is a 2018 American romantic comedy-drama film directed by Stephanie Laing and written by Bess Wohl. The film stars Gugu Mbatha-Raw and Michiel Huisman. It was released by Netflix on February 16, 2018.

== Plot ==
Abbie and Sam have been best friends since childhood and are engaged to be married. Their lives come crashing down when Abbie is given a terminal cancer diagnosis.

Faced with the prospect of an uncertain timeline, Abbie begins a search for a new love to take care of Sam. Along the way, Abbie makes unlikely friendships with three patients whose one thing in common is that they focus on living while they are dying.

Abbie dies at the end without having lived up to her potential, yet manages to come to terms with her situation and with those she is leaving behind.

== Cast ==
- Gugu Mbatha-Raw as Abbie
  - Celeste O'Connor as Teen Abbie
    - Alyssa Cheatham as Young Abbie
- Michiel Huisman as Sam
  - Sawyer Barth as Teen Sam
    - Zachary Hernandez as Young Sam
- Christopher Walken as Myron
- Brian Tyree Henry as Benji
- Steve Coogan as Mitch
- Timothy Simons as Dominic
- Tamara Tunie as Abbie's mother, Jane
- Jacki Weaver as Estelle
- Merritt Wever as Mindy
- Gayle Rankin as Mira
- Kate McKinnon as Glass Half Full Kate
- Jessie Ennis as Melanie
- Glenn Fleshler as Mean Phil

== Reception ==
On review aggregator website Rotten Tomatoes, the film has an approval rating of 33% based on 18 reviews, and an average rating of 5.2/10. On Metacritic, the film has a weighted average score of 34 out of 100, based on 7 critics, indicating "generally unfavorable" reviews.
