= Shoemaker (film) =

- Directed by: Colleen Murphy
- Written by: Jaan Kolk
- Produced by: Colin Brunton; Janet Hadjidimitriou; Elizabeth Yake
- Starring: Randy Hughson; Alberta Watson; Hardee T. Lineham; George Buza
- Cinematography: Christophe Bonnière
- Edited by: Wiebke von Carolsfeld
- Production company: Subjective Eye
- Release date: September 9, 1996 (TIFF)
- Running time: 80 min.
- Country: Canada
- Language: English

Shoemaker is a 1996 Canadian drama film directed by Colleen Murphy. It was written by Jaan Kolk and produced by Elizabeth Yake for Subjective Eye and the Canadian Film Centre.

The film stars Randy Hughson as Carey, a man with an intellectual disability who works in a shoe repair shop owned by Paul (Hardee T. Lineham); one day, Carey meets and begins a romantic relationship with Anna (Alberta Watson), a woman he meets at the grocery store. The cast also includes George Buza and Ellen-Ray Hennessy.

The film premiered at the 1996 Toronto International Film Festival, and was released theatrically in Canada and Germany in 1997.

== Awards and nominations ==
The film won the Audience Award, the Award of Independent Cinema Owners and the Prize of the Ecumenical Jury - Special Mention at the International Filmfestival Mannheim-Heidelberg in 1997, and was nominated for the Maverick Spirit Award at the Cinequest Film Festival in 1998.

The film received three Genie Award nominations at the 18th Genie Awards, with a Best Actress nod for Watson and a Best Supporting Actor nomination for Lineham, and a nomination for the Claude Jutra Award for Best First Feature.
