= Pierre Hébert (animator) =

Canadian animator in Montreal, Canada

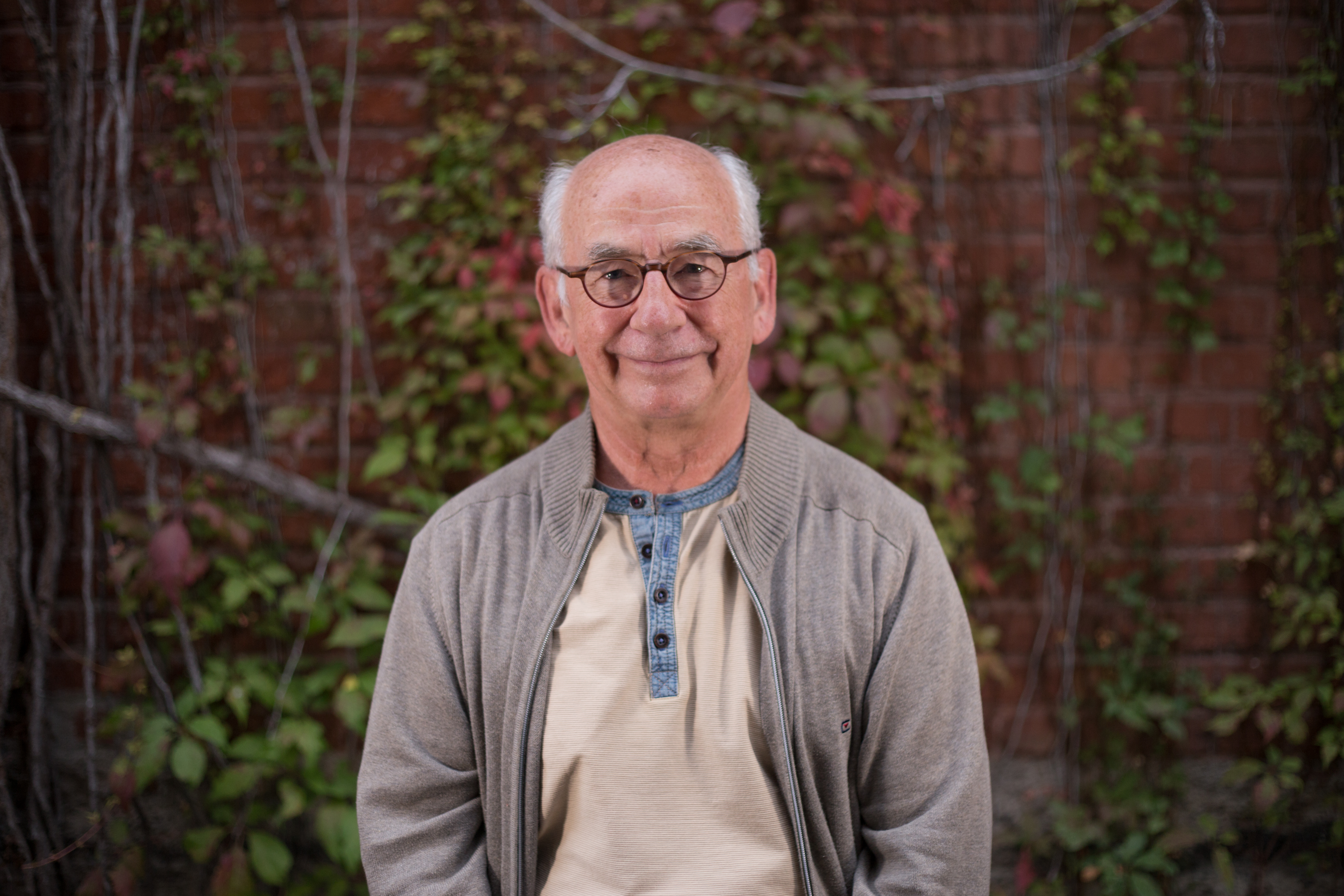
- Born: January 19, 1944 (age 82); Montreal, Quebec, Canada
- Years active: 1960s–present

Pierre Hébert (born January 19, 1944) is a Canadian animator from Montreal, Quebec, most noted for his 1996 feature film The Human Plant (La Plante humaine).

He has also had occasional acting roles, notably in Jean Pierre Lefebvre's films The Revolutionary (Le Revolutionnaire) and My Eye (Mon œil).

== Awards ==
His early short film Op Hop - Hop Op was the winner of the award for Best Short Film at the 1967 Montreal International Film Festival.

The Human Plant won the Association québécoise des critiques de cinéma at the Rendez-vous du cinéma québécois in 1997.

He is a two-time Genie Award nominee for Best Animated Short, receiving nods at the 18th Genie Awards in 1997 for Under the Weather (À l'ombre), and at the 23rd Genie Awards in 2003 for Pirouette, and a three-time Jutra Award/Prix Iris nominee for Best Animated Short Film, with nods at the 14th Jutra Awards in 2012 for Rivière au Tonnerre, the 15th Jutra Awards in 2013 for Triptych 2 (Triptyque 2), and the 21st Quebec Cinema Awards in 2019 for But One Bird Sang Not (Mais un oiseau ne chantait pas).

He was the 2004 recipient of the Prix Albert-Tessier for lifetime achievement in Quebec cinema.

In 2024 he was the subject of Scratches of Life: The Art of Pierre Hébert (Graver l'homme: arrêt sur Pierre Hébert), a documentary film about his career by Loïc Darses.

== Filmography ==
=== Director ===
- 1962 - Histoire verte
- 1962 - Histoire d'une bébite
- 1963 - Petite histoire méchante
- 1964 - Opus 1
- 1966 - Op Hop - Hop Op
- 1966 - Opus 3
- 1968 - Population Explosion (Explosion démographique)
- 1968 - Around Perception (Autour de la perception)
- 1969 - The Fox and the Crow (Le Corbeau et le renard)
- 1971 - Fundamental Principles in Genetics (Notions élémentaires de génétique)
- 1973 - Du coq à l'âne
- 1974 - A Piece of Cake (C'est pas chinois)
- 1974 - Santa Claus Is Coming Tonight (Père Noël, père Noël)
- 1978 - Entre chiens et loup
- 1982 - Memories of War (Souvenirs de guerre)
- 1984 - Songs and Dances of the Inanimate World: The Subway (Chants et danses du monde inanimé: Le métro)
- 1984 - Étienne et Sara
- 1985 - Love Addict (Offenbach)
- 1987 - Adieu bipède
- 1989 - La Lettre d'amour
- 1996 - The Human Plant (La Plante humaine)
- 2002 - Between Science and Garbage
- 2004 - Variations sur deux photographies de Tina Modotti
- 2005 - La technologie des larmes
- 2005 - La statue de Giordano Bruno
- 2007 - Herqueville
- 2009 - Praha-Florenc
- 2009 - Triptych (Triptyque)
- 2011 - Place Carnot-Lyon
- 2012 - Rivière au Tonnerre
- 2012 - Triptych 2 (Triptyque 2)
- 2013 - The Cage (La Cage)
- 2014 - You Look Like Me (Tu ressembles à moi)
- 2016 - Scratch (Triptyque 3)
- 2017 - Bazin's Film (Le Film de Bazin)
- 2018 - But One Bird Sang Not (Mais un oiseau ne chantait pas)
- 2021 - Mount Fuji Seen from a Moving Train (Le mont Fuji vu d'un train en marche)
- 2021 - Selfportrait Between Prague and Vienna (Autoportrait entre Prague et Vienne)
- 2026 - Prelude and Fugues: The Wood Thrush (Préludes et fugues - la grive des bois)

=== Producer ===
- 1970 - Catuor
- 1971 - Des ensembles
- 1971 - Cycle
- 1971 - The Little Men of Chromagnon (Les Bibites de Chromagnon)
- 1997 - The Lighthouse (Le Phare)
- 1997 - Under the Weather (À l'ombre)
- 1998 - The Threshold (Le seuil)
- 1998 - My Child, My Land (Mon enfant, ma terre)
- 1999 - The Dead Tree (L'Arbre mort)
- 1999 - The Hat (Le Chapeau)
- 2000 - Lonesome Monsieur Turgeon (La Solitude de Monsieur Turgeon)
- 2000 - Josephine
- 2000 - Black Soul (Âme noire)
- 2000 - 1974
- 2001 - The Song-Catcher (Chasse papillon)
- 2002 - Pirouette
- 2003 - L'Éternel et le brocanteur
