= A Better Man (film) =

- Film poster
- Directed by: Attiya Khan; Lawrence Jackman
- Written by: Attiya Khan; Lawrence Jackman
- Produced by: Christine Kleckner; Justine Pimlott
- Cinematography: Iris Ng
- Edited by: Lawrence Jackman
- Music by: Lesley Barber
- Production companies: Intervention Productions; National Film Board of Canada
- Release date: 30 April 2017 (Hot Docs)
- Running time: 79 minutes
- Country: Canada
- Language: English

A Better Man is a 2017 Canadian documentary film co-directed by Attiya Khan and Lawrence Jackman in which Khan, a survivor of domestic abuse, meets with the man who abused her to see if he can take responsibility to heal and repair the harms he created. The first filmed encounter between her and her ex-boyfriend, identified only as "Steve," took place in April 2013. After the initial contact, several of the conversations were facilitated by Tod Augusta-Scott, a prominent counselor in the domestic violence field. The film also follows them back to their old high school as well as an apartment in Ottawa, and shows how the violence still affects Khan.

The film was financed through crowdfunding on Indiegogo; it raised over $110,000 CAD, making it one of the most successful crowdfunding campaigns in Canadian history. Upon release, it received mostly positive reviews from critics, and was chosen as one of the top 10 best films of 2017 by The Globe and Mail.

== Background ==
After leaving Steve when she was 19, Khan would continue to encounter him in public. The first time she saw him, two years after she left him, Khan was weak and speechless. But as they continued to meet by chance over a six-year period, and her life continued to improve, they'd exchange a few minutes of small talk. It was during such chance encounter in 2011 that Steve asked if they could sit down. Once seated, Steve repeatedly apologized before bursting into tears.

In the ensuing years, Khan wondered if talking to Steve more might help her deal with her trauma, and help Steve to better understand the roots and consequences of his violence and make him less likely to reoffend. She also decided to try to record such a dialogue as a resource for both domestic abuse survivors and offenders. She proposed such an idea to Steve in 2013. Six months later, he texted her that he was ready to meet. Two days later, they did so at a coffee shop for their first recorded exchange. Khan and her ex-abuser would go on film eight days together over the course of a year, sharing their memories and experiences and with Steve facing the consequences of what he did.

== Production ==
A Better Man was co-produced by Intervention Productions (prod. Christine Kleckner) and the National Film Board of Canada (prod. Justine Pimlott), and executive produced by Sarah Polley, Anita Lee, Jane Jankovic, Janice Dawe, and Kathy Aurich-Johnson. The music was composed by Lesley Barber. Iris Ng was the film's cinematographer, having previously worked with Polley on Stories We Tell.

A Better Man was co-written and co-directed by Attiya Khan. Attiya Khan is a Canadian filmmaker, anti-violence activist, and intimate partner violence survivor. She graduated with a degree in women's studies and psychology from the University of Toronto. Her interest in helping others who have experienced domestic violence led her to take the Assaulted Women's and Children's Counsellor/Advocate program at George Brown College. Her career highlights include overseeing the Children and Youth Services Program at Transition House in Cambridge, Massachusetts, and wide-ranging roles including frontline work, management and training with YWCA Toronto. She is based in Toronto.

=== Crowdfunding ===
The film was crowd-sourced through an Indiegogo campaign, with Feist among the donors, contributing $10,000. The campaign would go on to raise over $110,000—one of the most successful crowdfunding campaigns in Canadian history.

== Release ==
The film screened at numerous film festivals and had its world premiere at the Hot Docs Canadian International Documentary Festival, where it was considered "one of Hot Docs most stirring films."

Today A Better Man continues to play at international film festivals and violence against women events. The film also plays on occasion at Hot Docs in Toronto, Ontario.

== Distribution ==
A Better Man is distributed in the United States by Women Make Movies.

=== Reception ===
Since its release, the film has received mostly positive reviews from critics; Kate Taylor of The Globe and Mail listed the film in her top 10 list of films for 2017.

The New Yorker film reviewer Doreen St. Félix commended the film's "cleverness" and wrote that "it resists the roundness of resolution or catharsis". Arwa Mahdawi of The Guardian described the film as "a call to action for abusive men to stand up and take responsibility for their anger and their actions". CBC host of The Current Anna Maria Tremonti stated that "there is a lot of raw emotion in this film and there is a lot hope". Maclean's reported that "the film manages to be simultaneously agonizing and hopeful... it is revelatory to know these kinds of [restorative] conversations are possible." Miriam Bale of Vulture.com called the film a "revolutionary documentary".

The Hollywood Reporter published a less enthusiastic review, concluding that "the vagueness and ambiguity of the situations eventually proves frustrating and detract from the film's power."

National Film Board of Canada made a review saying "A Better Man offers a fresh and nuanced look at the healing and revelation that can happen for everyone involved when men take responsibility for their abuse", commenting on the films use of healing process in domestic violence situations.

== See also ==
- Restorative justice
- Domestic violence
- Domestic Violence Documentaries
- Sexual Violence
- Thordis Elva - book of rape and responsibility.
