= Desire (2000 film) =

- Directed by: Colleen Murphy
- Written by: Colleen Murphy
- Produced by: Eberhard Junkersdorf; Elizabeth Yake
- Starring: Katja Riemann; Zachary Bennett; Elizabeth Shepherd; Alberta Watson; Graham Greene; Martin Donovan; Darcy Fehr
- Cinematography: Christophe Bonnière
- Music by: Robert Carli; Bill Thompson
- Production companies: Bioskop Film; Buffalo Gal Pictures; Subjective Eye
- Release date: 10 September 2000 (Canada)
- Running time: 97 min.
- Countries: Canada; Germany
- Language: English

Desire is a Canada/Germany treaty coproduction drama film, released in 2000. It was directed and written by Colleen Murphy produced by Elizabeth Yake (Canada) and Eberhard Junkersdorf (Germany). The film premiered at the Toronto International Film Festival.

== Plot ==
The film stars Zachary Bennett as Francis Waterson, an aspiring concert pianist, and Katja Riemann as Halley Fischer, an elementary school teacher with whom Francis enters a romantic relationship.

== Reception ==
Geoff Pevere of The Toronto Star gave it 1 star. He says "Desire is a movie you laugh at and not with, and even one's mirth is compromised by the mere fact the movie exists." Jay Stone gave it 1 1/2 stars in The Ottawa Citizen and wrote "As it happens, Desire skirts all of its psychology and goes right for the lurid, classical-music-loving loneliness of this Prairie enigma. We're left on our own, with just a few clues: a mask in the bathroom, a fear of swimming, a distant and music-loying family, none of which seem to have anything to do with it, but they're there anyway. Why? Arts funding." The Vancouver Sun's Katherine Monk gave it 2 stars, finishing "The film definitely has some good ideas, some talented people — look for indie star Martin Donovan as the creepy gay hotel manager — and some nice shots of Winnipeg. But not even these attractions can make Desire all that desirable." Bob Thompson of The Toronto Sun also gave it 2 stars saying "Lots of awkward dialogue, feeble plot points and self-consciously derivative foreshadowing count as negatives. They take away from an ominously effective conclusion."

== Awards and nominations ==
The film garnered two Genie Award nominations at the 22nd Genie Awards, with a Best Actress nod for Katja Riemann and a Best Actor nomination for Zachary Bennett.
