= Colleen Murphy (filmmaker) =

Canadian writer

Colleen Murphy CM
- Born: Colleen Louise Murphy; 1954 (age 71–72); Rouyn-Noranda, Quebec, Canada
- Occupations: screenwriter, playwright, film director
- Spouse: Allan King (1987-2009)
- Writing career
- Period: 1980s-present
- Notable works: Termini Station, The December Man, Beating Heart Cadaver
- Website: www.colleenmurphy.ca

Colleen Louise Murphy CM (born 1954 in Rouyn-Noranda, Quebec) is a Canadian screenwriter, film director and playwright. She is best known for works including her plays The December Man, which won the Governor General's Award for English-language drama at the 2007 Governor General's Awards, and Beating Heart Cadaver, which was a shortlisted nominee for the same award at the 1999 Governor General's Awards, and the film Termini Station, for which she garnered a Genie Award nomination for Best Original Screenplay at the 11th Genie Awards.

== Life and career ==
Murphy was a student at the Canadian Film Centre in the 1990s, and has also directed numerous films, both short films and feature films. Her first feature film as a director, Shoemaker, received two prizes from the Mannheim-Heidelberg Film Festival, and garnered two acting nominations at the 18th Genie Awards. Her second feature film, Desire, also garnered two acting nominations at the 22nd Genie Awards.

She has served as playwright in residence at a variety of institutions, including the Factory Theatre in Toronto, Ontario; the Citadel Theatre in Edmonton, Alberta; the Finborough Theatre in London, England and the University of Guelph. She was named playwright in residence at the University of Alberta's theatre department in June 2014.

She received the Order of Canada in 2024.

== Personal life ==
Murphy was born in Rouyn-Noranda, Quebec, and raised in Northern Ontario.

She was married to filmmaker Allan King from 1987 until his death in 2009.

She resides in Toronto.

== Works ==
=== Films ===
- Termini Station (1989)
- Putty Worm (1993)
- The Feeler (1995)
- Shoemaker (1996)
- Desire (2000)
- War Holes (2002)
- Girl with Dog (2005)
- Out in the Cold (2008)

=== Plays ===
- Fire Engine Red (1985)
- All Other Destinations Are Cancelled (1987)
- Pumpkin Eaters (1990)
- Down in Adoration Falling (1994)
- Beating Heart Cadaver (1998)
- The Piper (2002)
- The December Man (2007)
- The Goodnight Bird (2011)
- Pig Girl (2012)
- Armstrong's War (2013)
- The Breathing Hole (2017), Commissioned by Stratford Festival
