= The Human Plant =

1996 Canadian film directed by Pierre Hébert

- French: La Plante humaine
- Directed by: Pierre Hébert
- Written by: Pierre Hébert; Anne Quesemand
- Produced by: Yves Leduc; Freddy Denaës
- Starring: Michael Lonsdale; Sotigui Kouyaté
- Cinematography: Michael Cleary; Michel Dubois; Raymond Dumas; Barry Wood
- Edited by: Fernand Bélanger
- Music by: Robert Marcel Lepage
- Production companies: Arcadia Films; National Film Board of Canada
- Release date: September 13, 1996 (TIFF)
- Running time: 80 minutes
- Country: Canada
- Language: French

The Human Plant (French: La Plante humaine) is a Canadian animated feature film, directed by Pierre Hébert and released in 1996. The film stars Michael Lonsdale as Mr. Michel, a lonely and isolated widower who spends all his time at home watching television, but is driven to nightmare visions by the constant bombardment of negative and frightening information.

The film was a coproduction of the National Film Board of Canada and commercial film studio Arcadia Films. It grew out of an experimental stage animation project that Hébert undertook with composer Robert Marcel Lepage in the 1990s, in which Hébert would draw improvisational animations while Lepage performed a live score.

Its voice cast also included Sotigui Kouyaté, Domini Blythe, Joseph Rouleau, Michelle Allen, Laurent Chabot, Marisa Corriols and Denis Karegeya.

The film premiered at the 1996 Toronto International Film Festival. It was subsequently screened at the Ottawa International Animation Festival and at the Festival du nouveau cinéma.

Lepage received a Genie Award nomination for Best Original Score at the 18th Genie Awards in 1997. The film won the Prix AQCC-SODEC from the Association québécoise des critiques de cinéma at the Rendez-vous du cinéma québécois in 1997.
