= Lesley Barber =

Canadian composer

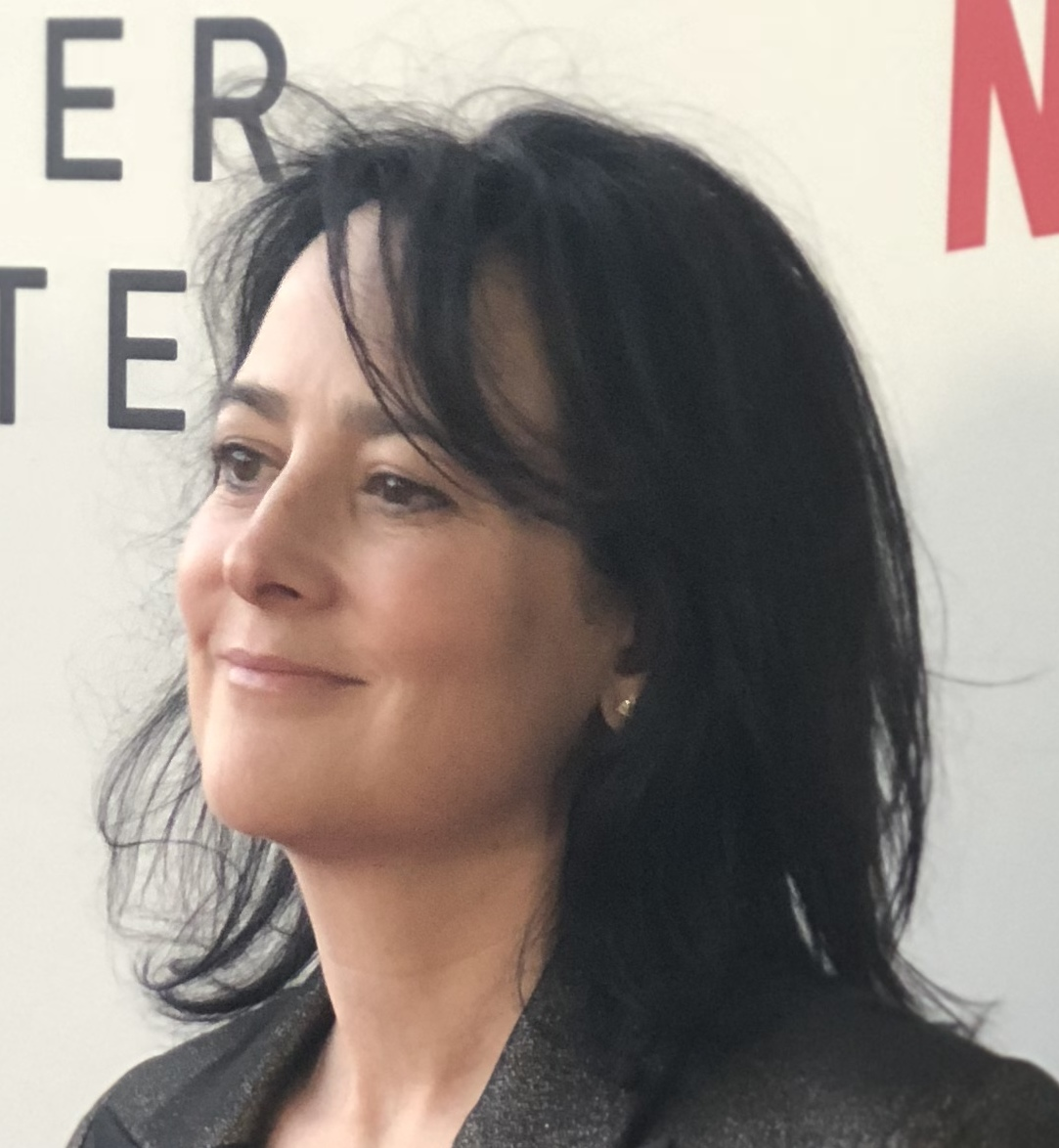
- Barber attends the Nappily Ever After premiere in Los Angeles, 2018

Background information
- Born: 1962 (age 63–64)
- Origin: Toronto, Ontario, Canada
- Genres: Film score
- Occupations: Film composer, orchestrator, arranger, conductor
- Instruments: Piano, keyboard
- Years active: 1995–present
- Website: lesleybarber.com

Lesley Barber (born 1962) is a Canadian composer of music for film, theatre, chamber and orchestral ensembles and she is also a conductor, pianist, producer, and multi-instrumentalist. Barber is best known for composing the film scores for Manchester by the Sea, Late Night, You Can Count on Me, Mansfield Park, Irreplaceable You, Hysterical Blindness, When Night Is Falling, and composing music for the animated television series Little Bear.

== Early life and education ==
Born in 1962 in Toronto, Ontario, Barber started composing at age 10. She won several young composer awards and graduated with a master's degree in music composition from The University of Toronto in 1988, studying with electro-acoustic music pioneer, composer Gustav Ciamaga and composer Lothar Klein.

== Career ==
After university, Barber spent several years scoring for the alternative theatre scene in Toronto, creating music for over 20 theatre productions. Notable theatre works include Brad Fraser's Unidentified Human Remains and The True Nature of Love George F. Walker's Love and Anger, Nothing Sacred, Escape from Happiness, and Michel Garneau's The Warriors. The latter two productions received Dora Mavor Moore Awards for Outstanding Original Score.

As a classical composer Barber has been commissioned by artists such as pianist Eve Egoyan, the Canadian Electronic Ensemble, Hemispheres Orchestra, and serving as Young Composer in Residence at the Festival of the Sound, and Winnipeg's New Music Festival. Works include Long White Line (for orchestra), Rhythmic Voodoo (percussion and electronica). Music for a Lonely Zamboni (piano trio) and Marshland (string quartet). Barber composed for Yo-Yo Ma for the television series Yo-Yo Ma: Inspired by Bach.

Barber has cited as musical influences Takemitsu, Corigliano, Haydn, Sofia Gubaidulina, Steve Reich, PJ Harvey, Radiohead, Carter Burwell, Ennio Morricone, and Philip Glass.

Barber's work on film scores includes Kenneth Lonergan's Academy Award-nominated feature film You Can Count on Me, Jerry Rothwell's award-winning documentary, How to Change the World, Mira Nair's Emmy and Golden Globe award-winning Hysterical Blindness (starring Uma Thurman and Gena Rowlands), Mary Harron's The Moth Diaries, Patricia Rozema's Mansfield Park and When Night Is Falling, the award-winning children's classic television animated series Little Bear with Maurice Sendak, Wiebke Von Carolsfeld's Marion Bridge, the recently released powerhouse doc The Apology by Tiffany Hsiung and Kenneth Lonergan's award-winning Manchester by the Sea. Lesleys other films include a remake of the film Beaches, Attiya Khan's award-winning documentary A Better Man, Boarding School, a horror adventure film written directed by Boaz Yakin, the Netflix features Nappily Ever After, directed by Haifaa alMansour, Irreplaceable You, directed by Stephanie Laing, and Late Night, starring Emma Thompson and Mindy Kaling, and directed by Nisha Ganatra. Barber has recorded scores in Toronto, London, Los Angeles, New York, and Budapest and worked with Miramax, New Line, Focus Features, Nickelodeon, Warner Bros., and Home Box Office amongst others.

In 2016, Barber was the first female composer to be featured on The Hollywood Reporter Composer Roundtable, where she appeared next to Hans Zimmer, Justin Hurwitz, Nicholas Britell, John Debney, and Hauschka.

== Personal life ==
Barber has two children with her former partner, film director Patricia Rozema.

== Filmography ==
- Four Weddings and a Funeral (miniseries) (2019)
- Late Night (2019)
- Nappily Ever After (2018)
- Boarding School (2018)
- Irreplaceable You (2018)
- Beaches (2017)
- A Better Man (2017)
- Manchester by the Sea (2016)
- The Apology (2016)
- How to Change the World (2015)
- Pete's Christmas (2015)
- The Moth Diaries (2011)
- A Child's Garden of Poetry (2010)
- Girls on Top (2010)
- Victoria Day (2009)
- Kit Kittredge: An American Girl (2008) (additional music)
- Death in Love (2008)
- A Thousand Years of Good Prayers (2007)
- Comeback Season (2006)
- We Don't Live Here Anymore (2004) (additional music)
- Seven Little Monsters (2000–2003) TV series (all episodes)
- The Real Jane Austen (2002) (TV)
- Marion Bridge (2002)
- Hysterical Blindness (2002) (TV)
- The Little Bear Movie (2001)
- You Can Count on Me (2000)
- This Might Be Good (2000)
- Mansfield Park (1999)
- Luminous Motion (1998)
- A Price Above Rubies (1998)
- Los Locos: Posse Rides Again (1997)
- Yo-Yo Ma Inspired by Bach – Bach Cello Suite #6: Six Gestures (1997) TV series
- Turning April (1996)
- What's His Face (1995)
- When Night Is Falling (1995)
- Little Bear (1995–2001) TV series (all 65 episodes)

=== Music ===
- Victoria Day (2009) conductor, orchestrator
- Kit Kittredge: An American Girl (2008) orchestrator
- A Thousand Years of Good Prayers (2007) conductor, orchestrator
- Comeback Season (2006) orchestrator
- Being Julia (2004) song producer
- Maurice Sendak's Seven Little Monsters (2000–2003) conductor, orchestrator
- Marion Bridge (2002) orchestrator
- Hysterical Blindness (2002) (TV) conductor, orchestrator
- The Little Bear Movie (2001) orchestrator
- You Can Count on Me (2000) orchestrator
- Mansfield Park (1999) orchestrator
- Luminous Motion (1998) (conductor) orchestrator
- A Price Above Rubies (1998) orchestrator
- Turning April (1996) conductor, orchestrator
- When Night Is Falling (1995) conductor, orchestrator
