= 18th Genie Awards =

1997 Canadian film awards ceremony

- Date: December 14, 1997
- Site: Westin Harbour Castle Hotel, Toronto
- Hosted by: Geoff Pevere; Cameron Bailey

Highlights
- Best Picture: The Sweet Hereafter
- Most nominations: The Sweet Hereafter

Television coverage
- Network: Bravo!

The 18th Genie Awards were held on 14 December 1997 to honour Canadian films released that year. to honour the best Canadian films of 1997. The ceremony's hosts were film critics Geoff Pevere and Cameron Bailey.

For this year, CBC Television declined to broadcast the ceremony; in recent years, the academy's experimentation with formats had not been successful. The CBC did, however, commit to the popular one-hour Preview show. Bravo! immediately agreed to air the entire ceremony, but not live—the show was aired the following day. In support, CTV, Global, The Movie Network and Super Écran also provided awards-related programming.

This year's awards were dominated by Atom Egoyan's The Sweet Hereafter, Thom Fitzgerald's The Hanging Garden, Gabriel Pelletier's Karmina, André Forcier's The Countess of Baton Rouge (La Comtesse de Bâton Rouge) and, from Lynne Stopkewich, Kissed. Two Special Awards were given: one for Outstanding Achievement in Make-up, to Pierre Saindon for his work on Karmina; the other to Telefilm Canada for its development and support of the Canadian film industry.

== Award winners and nominees ==
Motion Picture	Direction
The Sweet Hereafter — Atom Egoyan, Camelia Frieberg; Cosmos — Roger Frappier; The Hanging Garden — Thom Fitzgerald, Louise Garfield, Arnie Gelbart; Karmina — Nicole Robert; Kissed — Dean English, Lynne Stopkewich	Atom Egoyan, The Sweet Hereafter; Thom Fitzgerald, The Hanging Garden; André Forcier, The Countess of Baton Rouge (La Comtesse de Bâton Rouge); Gabriel Pelletier, Karmina; Lynne Stopkewich, Kissed
Actor in a leading role	Actress in a leading role
Ian Holm, The Sweet Hereafter; Robin Aubert, The Countess of Baton Rouge (La Comtesse de Bâton Rouge); Bruce Greenwood, The Sweet Hereafter; Peter Outerbridge, Kissed; Alan Williams, The Cockroach that Ate Cincinnati	Molly Parker, Kissed; Isabelle Cyr, Karmina; Sarah Polley, The Sweet Hereafter; Gabrielle Rose, The Sweet Hereafter; Alberta Watson, Shoemaker
Actor in a supporting role	Actress in a supporting role
Peter MacNeill, The Hanging Garden; Frédéric Desager, The Countess of Baton Rouge (La Comtesse de Bâton Rouge); Hardee T. Lineham, Shoemaker; Tom McCamus, The Sweet Hereafter	Seana McKenna, The Hanging Garden; France Castel, The Countess of Baton Rouge (La Comtesse de Bâton Rouge); France Castel, Karmina; Kerry Fox, The Hanging Garden; Joan Orenstein, The Hanging Garden
Best Feature Length Documentary	Best Short Documentary
Anne Claire Poirier, Paul Lapointe and Joanne Carrière, Tu as crié Let Me Go; Michael Allder and Tim Southam, Drowning in Dreams; Julia Sereny and Maya Gallus, Erotica: A Journey Into Female Sexuality	Maureen Judge and Janis Lundman, Unveiled: The Mother/Daughter Relationship; Loretta Todd, Carol Geddes, Michael Doxtater and Jerry Krepakevich, Forgotten Warriors; Ali Kazimi, Shooting Indians: A Journey with Jeffrey Thomas
Best Live Action Short Drama	Best Animated Short
Naomi McCormack, The Hangman's Bride; Vincenzo Natali, Steven Hoban and Vanessa C. Laufer, Elevated; Marcel Giroux and Sylvain Guy, Zie 37 Stagen; Scott Smith, Sarah James and Helen Du Toit, Sshhh...	Bernard Lajoie, Didier Brunner and Sylvain Chomet, The Old Lady and the Pigeons (La vieille dame et les pigeons); Tali Prévost, Yves Leduc and Pierre Hébert, Under the Weather (À l'ombre); Barrie McLean and Janet Perlman, Dinner for Two
Art Direction/Production Design	Cinematography
Normand Sarazin, Karmina; Phillip Barker and Patricia Cuccia, The Sweet Hereafter; Serge Bureau, Night of the Flood (La nuit du déluge); Claude Paré, The Countess of Baton Rouge (La Comtesse de Bâton Rouge); Taavo Soodor and Darlene Sheils, The Hanging Garden	Paul Sarossy, The Sweet Hereafter; Éric Cayla, Karmina; Serge Ladouceur, Night of the Flood (La nuit du déluge); Gregory Middleton, Kissed; André Turpin, Cosmos
Costume Design	Editing
Denis Sperdouklis, Karmina; Yveline Bonjean and Liz Vandal, Night of the Flood (La nuit du déluge); Francesca Chamberland, The Revenge of the Woman in Black (La vengeance de la femme en noir); Suzanne Harel, The Countess of Baton Rouge (La Comtesse de Bâton Rouge); Beth Pasternak, The Sweet Hereafter; James A. Worthen, The Hanging Garden	Susan Shanks, The Hanging Garden; Pia Di Ciaula, Intimate Relations; Gaétan Huot, Karmina; Richard Comeau, The Countess of Baton Rouge (La Comtesse de Bâton Rouge); Susan Shipton, The Sweet Hereafter
Overall Sound	Sound Editing
Daniel Pellerin, Keith Elliott, Peter Kelly and Ross Redfern, The Sweet Hereafter; Luc Boudrias, Don Cohen, Jo Caron and Bruno Ruffolo, Karmina; Dominique Chartrand, Jo Caron and Hans Peter Strobl, The Countess of Baton Rouge (La Comtesse de Bâton Rouge); Peter Harper, Philippe Espantoso and Georges Hannan, The Hanging Garden; Hans Peter Strobl, Daniel Bisson, Jo Caron and Marcel Chouinard, The Seat of the Soul (Le siège de l'âme)	Steve Munro, Sue Conley, Goro Koyama, Andy Malcolm and David Drainie Taylor, The Sweet Hereafter; Louis Dupire, Diane Boucher, Martin Pinsonnault, Monique Vézina and Alice Wright, Karmina; Marcel Pothier, Mathieu Beaudin, Jérôme Décarie, Guy Pelletier and Myriam Poirier, The Countess of Baton Rouge (La Comtesse de Bâton Rouge); Myriam Poirier, Mathieu Beaudin, Jérôme Décarie and Jacques Plante, The Seat of the Soul (Le siège de l'âme); Marcel Pothier, Guy Francoeur, Antoine Morin, Viateur Paiement and Myriam Poirier, The Caretaker's Lodge (La Conciergerie)
Achievement in Music: Original Score	Achievement in Music: Original Song
Mychael Danna, The Sweet Hereafter; François Dompierre, The Ideal Man (L'Homme idéal); Serge LaForest and Gaëtan Gravel, Night of the Flood (La nuit du déluge); Robert Marcel Lepage, The Human Plant (La Plante humaine); Don McDonald, Kissed	François Dompierre and Luc Plamondon, "L'homme idéal" — The Ideal Man (L'Homme idéal); Mychael Danna and Sarah Polley, "The Sweet Hereafter" — The Sweet Hereafter; Kristy Thirsk, "Bounds of Love" — Kissed
Screenplay	Special awards
Thom Fitzgerald, The Hanging Garden; Atom Egoyan, The Sweet Hereafter; André Forcier, The Countess of Baton Rouge (La Comtesse de Bâton Rouge); Gabriel Pelletier, Yves Pelletier, Andrée Pelletier and Ann Burke, Karmina; Lynne Stopkewich and Angus Fraser, Kissed	Board of Directors Award: Telefilm Canada; Claude Jutra Award: Thom Fitzgerald, The Hanging Garden; Golden Reel Award: Air Bud; Achievement in Make-Up: Pierre Saindon, Karmina
