= Love, Math and Sex =

1997 Film

- Directed by: Charlotte Silvera
- Written by: Charlotte Silvera
- Starring: Julie Delarme
- Release dates: 6 September 1997 (TIFF); 5 August 1998 (France)
- Running time: 100 minutes
- Country: France
- Language: French

Love, Math and Sex (French: C'est la tangente que je préfère) is a 1997 French drama film directed by Charlotte Silvera. It was screened in the Contemporary World Cinema section of the 1997 Toronto International Film Festival.

== Cast ==
- Julie Delarme as Sabine
- Georges Corraface as Jiri
- Marie-Christine Barrault as the mathematics teacher
- Agnès Soral as Sabine's mother
- Christophe Malavoy as Sabine's father
