= Randy Hughson =

Canadian actor (born 1961)

Randy Hughson (born 1961) is a Canadian actor from Kingston, Ontario. Most prominently a stage actor, he has also had some film and television roles.

He is a 1984 graduate of the theatre program at Ryerson University. He married actress Waneta Storms in 1999.

== Filmography ==
=== Film ===
Year	Title	Role	Notes
1995	The Feeler	Danny	
1995	Rude	Caller	
1996	Shoemaker	Carey	
1998	Stolen Heart	Buchanan	
2000	Washed Up	Surfer	
2002	Touch	Lover	
2003	Luck	Bill	
2011	Getting Past the Bull	Frank	

=== Television ===
Year	Title	Role	Notes
1988	T. and T.	Stark	One episode
1989	Katts and Dog		One episode
1992	The Valour and the Horror	Laurie Mackay	
1993	Side Effects	Hank Wilson	One episode
1993	Gross Misconduct: The Life of Brian Spencer	Greg	
1995	Kung Fu: The Legend Continues	Gavin	One episode
1996	Little Criminals	Vince	
1999	Summer's End	Rainey	
1999	Exhibit A: Secrets of Forensic Science	Jonathan Yeo	One episode
1999	PSI Factor: Chronicles of the Paranormal	Fr. Malachy Reilly	One episode
2002	Blue Murder	Charles Grady	One episode
2005-08	Delilah & Julius		31 episodes
2015	CBC Presents the Stratford Festival: "Antony and Cleopatra"	Lepidus	
2018	CBC Presents the Stratford Festival: "Romeo and Juliet"	Lord Capulet	
2020	CBC Presents the Stratford Festival: "The Merry Wives of Windsor"	Pistol	

== Awards ==
Award	Year	Category	Work	Result	Ref
Dora Mavor Moore Awards	1991	Best Leading Actor, General Theatre	The Crackwalker	Nominated	
Dora Mavor Moore Awards	1994	Outstanding Performance by a Male, Midsize Theatre	Scheherezade	Nominated	
Dora Mavor Moore Awards	1996	Outstanding Performance by a Male, Midsize Theatre	High Life	Nominated	
Dora Mavor Moore Awards	1997	Best Actor, Small Theatre	Possible Worlds	Won	
Dora Mavor Moore Awards	1999	Best Supporting Actor, General Theatre	The Memory of Water (Tarragon Theatre)	Nominated	
Dora Mavor Moore Awards	2000	Best Supporting Actor, General Theatre	The Memory of Water (Elgin and Winter Garden Theatres)	Nominated	
Dora Mavor Moore Awards	2001	Best Leading Actor, General Theatre	Earshot	Nominated	
Dora Mavor Moore Awards	2001	Best Supporting Actor, General Theatre	Zadie's Shoes	Nominated	
Gemini Awards	2002	Best Performance by an Actor in a Guest Role Dramatic Series	Blue Murder	Nominated	
Jessie Richardson Theatre Award	1994	Outstanding Performance by an Actor in a Lead Role	Whale Riding Weather	Nominated	
Jessie Richardson Theatre Award	1996	Outstanding Performance by an Actor in a Lead Role	The Crucible	Nominated	
Jessie Richardson Theatre Award	2003	Outstanding Performance by an Actor in a Lead Role	Earshot	Nominated	
