= The Feeler (film) =

1995 Canadian short film

- Directed by: Colleen Murphy
- Produced by: Elizabeth Yake
- Starring: Randy Hughson; Victoria Snow
- Cinematography: Christophe Bonnière
- Production company: Canadian Film Centre
- Release date: August 1995 (MWFF)
- Running time: 25 minutes
- Country: Canada
- Language: English

The Feeler is a 1995 Canadian short drama film, directed by Colleen Murphy. The film stars Randy Hughson as Danny, a blind man who must rely on his sense of touch to navigate the world, and Victoria Snow as Lina, a care worker who comes to read books to him.

The film premiered at the 1995 Montreal World Film Festival, and was later screened at the 1995 Toronto International Film Festival.

It received a Genie Award nomination for Best Theatrical Short Film at the 17th Genie Awards in 1996.
