= Pirouette (film) =

- French: La Pirouette
- Directed by: Tali Prévost
- Produced by: Pierre Hébert; Marcel Jean
- Edited by: Fernand Bélanger
- Music by: René Lussier
- Animation by: Tali Prévost
- Production company: National Film Board of Canada
- Release date: August 23, 2002 (FFM)
- Running time: 10 minutes
- Country: Canada

Pirouette (French: La Pirouette) is a Canadian animated short film, directed by Tali Prévost and released in 2002. The film centres on an old woman living on a farm, who lovingly takes care of her farm animals despite the fact that she will eventually kill them for food.

The film was a Genie Award nominee for Best Animated Short Film at the 23rd Genie Awards in 2003.
