= The Seat of the Soul (film) =

- French: Le Siège de l'âme
- Directed by: Olivier Asselin
- Written by: Olivier Asselin
- Produced by: Arlette Dion; Denise Robert
- Starring: Emmanuel Bilodeau; Lucille Fluet; Rémy Girard
- Cinematography: Daniel Jobin
- Edited by: Richard Comeau
- Music by: François Dompierre
- Production company: Cinémaginaire
- Distributed by: Malofilm
- Release date: September 1, 1997
- Running time: 105 minutes
- Country: Canada
- Language: French

The Seat of the Soul (French: Le Siège de l'âme) is a Canadian drama film, directed by Olivier Asselin and released in 1997. The film stars Emmanuel Bilodeau as Jules, a scientist in the late 19th century who sets out to prove the existence of the human soul after finding a mummy with its heart still beating.

The cast also includes Lucille Fluet as Sophie, a suicidal young woman with whom Jules falls in love, and Rémy Girard as a detective.

The film premiered in theatres in Quebec on September 1, 1997, and was screened at the 1997 Toronto International Film Festival.

The film received two Genie Award nominations at the 18th Genie Awards in 1998, for Best Overall Sound (Hans Peter Strobl, Daniel Bisson, Jo Caron and Marcel Chouinard) and Best Sound Editing (Myriam Poirier, Mathieu Beaudin, Jérôme Décarie and Jacques Plante).
