= Bp: pushing the boundaries =

1997 Canadian documentary film

bp: pushing the boundaries
- Directed by: Brian Nash
- Produced by: Elizabeth Yake
- Starring: bpNichol
- Edited by: Joe Costa
- Release date: September 9, 1997 (TIFF)
- Running time: 60 minutes
- Country: Canada
- Language: English

bp: pushing the boundaries is a Canadian short documentary film, directed by Brian Nash and released in 1997. The film is a portrait of the life and career of Canadian experimental poet bpNichol.

The film premiered at the 1997 Toronto International Film Festival, where it received an honorable mention from the jury for the Best Canadian Short Film award. It was a Genie Award nominee for Best Short Documentary at the 19th Genie Awards in 1999.
