= Drowning in Dreams =

1997 Canadian documentary film

- Directed by: Tim Southam
- Produced by: Michael Allder
- Cinematography: Éric Cayla
- Edited by: Nick Hector
- Production company: National Film Board of Canada
- Release date: September 12, 1997 (TIFF)
- Running time: 75 minutes
- Country: Canada
- Language: English

Drowning in Dreams is a Canadian documentary film, directed by Tim Southam and released in 1997. The film centres on Fred Broennle, a German-Canadian businessman from Thunder Bay, Ontario, who engaged in a multi-year effort to raise the shipwrecked Gunilda from the bottom of Lake Superior.

The film premiered at the 1997 Toronto International Film Festival.

The film received a Genie Award nomination for Best Feature Length Documentary at the 18th Genie Awards.
