= Sweet Angel Mine =

- Directed by: Curtis Radclyffe
- Written by: Tim Willocks; Sue Maheu
- Produced by: Sam Taylor; Christopher Zimmer
- Music by: Daniel Lanois & John McCarthy
- Release date: 1996
- Running time: 88 minutes
- Countries: United Kingdom; Canada

Sweet Angel Mine is a 1996 thriller film directed by Curtis Radclyffe.

== Plot ==
Paul, a young man from London, arrives in the small Nova Scotia town of Milestone, where his long lost father was last seen years earlier. Paul is eager to find out what brought his father to this remote community. He meets Rauchine, a young, beautiful and unaffected girl who lives with her unstable mother and domineering grandmother on a nearby island, who is eking out a harsh and isolated living. Paul finds himself enmeshed in a web of jealousy, bitterness and fear as his attraction to Rauchine begins to grow. After a failed attempt to leave the island with Paul, Rauchine must make a crucial decision and break the cycle of violence and death that has marked her life.

== Nominations and awards ==
- Won the International Fantasy Film Special Jury Award at Fantasporto 1997
- Nominated for Best Film at Fantasporto 1997
