= Zie 37 Stagen =

1997 Canadian short film

- Directed by: Sylvain Guy
- Written by: Sylvain Guy
- Produced by: Marcel Giroux
- Starring: Thierry Frémont; Denis Mercier; Dino Tavarone
- Cinematography: Serge Ladouceur
- Edited by: Claude Grégoire
- Production company: GPA Films
- Release date: February 1997 (RVCQ)
- Running time: 23 minutes
- Country: Canada

Zie 37 Stagen is a Canadian short comedy film, directed by Sylvain Guy and released in 1997. The film centres on an assassin who enters an elevator with a military general with the intention of killing him, only for the elevator trip to be more wild and fantastical than anybody but the elevator operator had imagined.

The film's dialogue is spoken entirely in a mashup of several different European languages.

The film premiered at the Rendez-vous du cinéma québécois in February 1997, and was later screened at the 1997 Yorkton Film Festival, the 1997 Cinéfest Sudbury International Film Festival, and in the Perspective Canada program at the 1997 Toronto International Film Festival.

It won six awards at Yorkton, for Best of Festival, Best Comedy, Best Art Direction, Best Cinematography, Best Sound, and Best Direction. At Cinéfest, it won the award for Best Canadian Short Film.

It was a Genie Award nominee for Best Live Action Short Drama at the 18th Genie Awards.
