= Cotton Candy (1997 film) =

- Directed by: Roshell Bissett
- Written by: Roshell Bissett
- Produced by: Roshell Bissett
- Starring: Yôko Higashi; Mitsuka Ohbuchi; Kazutoyo Yoshimi
- Cinematography: Hiroki Miyano
- Edited by: Roshell Bissett
- Release date: 1997
- Running time: 46 minutes
- Country: Canada
- Language: Japanese

Cotton Candy is a Canadian short film, directed by Roshell Bissett and released in 1997. An exploration of the "Lolita complex" in Japanese society, the film centres on Naomi (Yoko Higashi), a shy teenage girl in Tokyo, who goes downtown with her classmates and discovers an opportunity to profit from the common sexual fetish for young women in schoolgirl uniforms.

The film premiered at the 1997 Toronto International Film Festival, where it won the Toronto International Film Festival Award for Best Canadian Short Film.

The film was briefly the subject of controversy in 2000, when the Reform Party of Canada criticized a $500 travel grant that the Canada Council for the Arts had given Bissett to travel to a film festival where the film was screening. Bissett responded to the controversy by saying "We're always talking about creating Canadian culture and creating an identity separate from the United States and everything. How are we supposed to do that without some kind of support and some kind of freedom of expression to do that as well?"
