= Laugh in the Dark =

- Directed by: Justine Pimlott
- Produced by: Justine Pimlott
- Starring: Gary Colwell; Don Morden; Doris Mehegan
- Release date: 1999
- Running time: 47 minutes
- Country: Canada
- Language: English

Laugh in the Dark is a Canadian documentary film, directed by Justine Pimlott and released in 1999. The film profiles a group of gay men who, in response to the HIV/AIDS crisis of the early 1980s, moved to the faded resort town of Crystal Beach, Ontario with an eye to reviving it as a gay resort comparable to Provincetown or Fire Island; spearheaded by Gary Colwell and Don Morden, the group launched a bed and breakfast, a restaurant and a drag cabaret.

The film's name is taken from a dark ride of the same name that operated at Crystal Beach Park.

In his book Romance of Transgression in Canada: Queering Sexualities, Nations, Cinemas, Thomas Waugh called the film "one of the most effective and affecting elegies in Canadian queer cinema."

The film premiered at the Inside Out Film and Video Festival in 1999, winning the award for Best Canadian Film. It was subsequently screened at the Hot Docs Canadian International Documentary Festival in 2000, winning the award for Best Film on Social Issues.
