= The Mystery of Mazo de la Roche =

- Directed by: Maya Gallus
- Written by: Maya Gallus
- Produced by: Maya Gallus
- Starring: Deborah Hay; Jordyn Negri; Severn Thompson
- Cinematography: Stan Barua
- Edited by: Roslyn Kalloo
- Production company: Red Queen Productions
- Distributed by: National Film Board of Canada
- Release date: April 29, 2012
- Running time: 52 minutes
- Country: Canada
- Language: English

The Mystery of Mazo de la Roche is a 2012 Canadian biographical docudrama film written and directed by Maya Gallus. The film explores the private personal life of Canadian writer Mazo de la Roche, using a mixture of archival materials, interviews and dramatic reenactments, centering in large part on the unresolved question of whether de la Roche's longtime Boston marriage with Caroline Clement was a lesbian relationship in modern terms.

The dramatic reenactments star Severn Thompson as de la Roche, and Deborah Hay as Clement.

The film premiered at the 2012 Hot Docs Canadian International Documentary Festival, but was distributed principally as a television broadcast on Bravo rather than theatrically. It later received a repeat screening at the 2017 festival, as part of a program of biographical documentary films about significant women in history.

The film received three Canadian Screen Award nominations at the 2nd Canadian Screen Awards in 2014, for Best Editorial Research (Gallus), Best Visual Research (Erin Chisholm) and Best Photography in a Documentary Program or Series (Stan Barua).
