= Canadian Film Centre =

Film school in Toronto, Ontario

Canadian Film Centre (CFC)
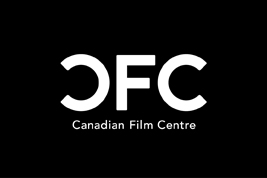
- Type: Charitable
- Founded: 1988
- Founder: Norman Jewison
- Headquarters: Toronto, Ontario, Canada
- Revenue: 9,248,866 Canadian dollar (2024)
- Total assets: 13,597,338 Canadian dollar (2003)
- Number of employees: 47 (2024)

The Canadian Film Centre (CFC) is a film production and charitable organization founded in 1988 by filmmaker Norman Jewison in Toronto, Ontario, Canada. Originally launched as a film school, today it provides training, development and advancement opportunities for professionals in the Canadian film, television and digital media industries, including directors, producers, screenwriters, actors and musicians.

== History ==
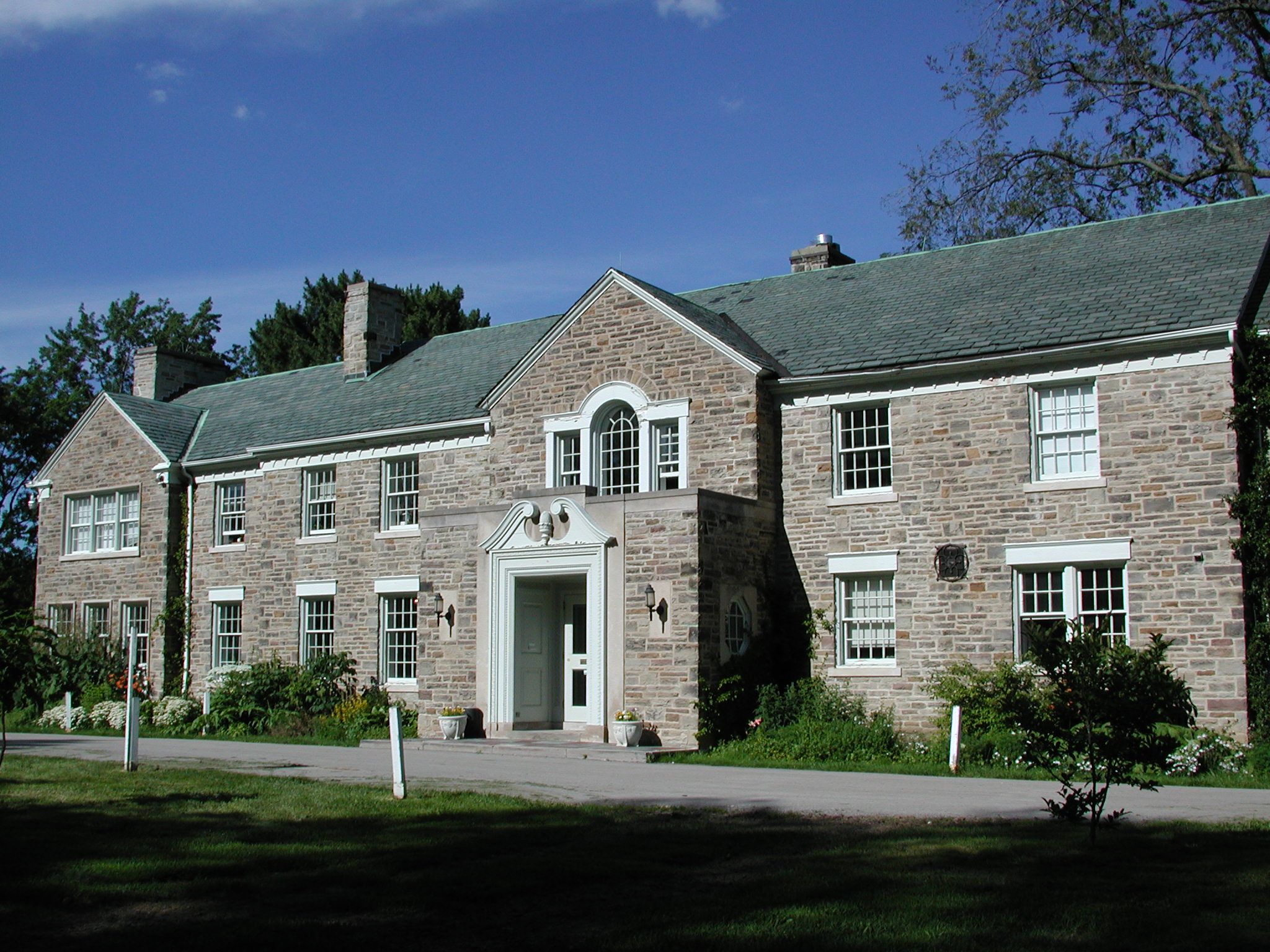
Windfields Estate in 2000

CFC was established in 1988 by Canadian filmmaker Norman Jewison as the Canadian Centre For Advanced Film Studies; the first program was attended by 12 residents. The inaugural class included writer Robert Hunter, filmmakers Holly Dale, Gerald L'Ecuyer, Anne Petrie and Peter Raymont, and producer Ann Medina. The school's campus was located at Windfields Estate, the former home of Canadian business magnate E. P. Taylor.

In 1991, after producer Robert Lantos received a CA$250,000 prize from Telefilm Canada to honour Black Robe winning the Genie Award for Best Picture, he immediately donated the money to the Canadian Film Centre to help establish its film unit, which serves as the primary film studio for projects being developed by CFC students.

Peter O'Brian was appointed as executive director of CFC by Norman Jewison in 1988 and remained in the role until 1991. Wayne Clarkson served as the organization's executive director from 1991 until 2005. At that point, Slawko Klymkiw, previously the Canadian Broadcasting Corporation's executive director of network programming, became the CEO of CFC until he retired in the spring of 2021. Maxine Bailey, former vice-president of Advancement at TIFF, was appointed as executive director of CFC in May 2021.

In 2014, CFC unveiled the new Northern Dancer Pavilion, a building to house its multidisciplinary study programs, on the Windfields campus.

As of 2018, its 30th year of operation, CFC had more than 100 residents and participants in 16 programs annually. CFC has more than 1,700 alumni and 100 alumni partner companies to date.

== Training and advancement ==
CFC offers a variety of programs in five separate media streams: film, television, music, screen acting, and digital media. Each stream offers practical, intensive, hands-on programs that are administered under the guidance of faculty and industry professionals, and are operated in conjunction with entertainment companies and educational institutions including Netflix, AMC, A&E, Cineplex Entertainment, the National Film Board of Canada, Telefilm Canada, NBC Universal, Slaight Communications, WildBrain, Bell Media, the Canadian Broadcasting Corporation and OCAD University.

CFC's film programs include the Norman Jewison Film Program and CFC Features. Television programs include Bell Media Prime Time TV Program for series writers, and the WildBrain Experience for development of kid- and family-targeted content. CFC also runs the Netflix/CFC Global Project, which targets Canada's traditionally under-served creatives and communities

Its main program for actors is the CBC Actors Conservatory, a six-month program. For musicians, the centre operates the Slaight Family Music Lab, a part-time nine-month program for composers and songwriters.

The CFC Media Lab is a digital media think tank and production facility that provides a research, learning and production environment for digital media content developers and practitioners, as well as acceleration programs and services for digital entertainment start-ups. Its programs include the Fifth Wave Initiative, to accelerate and sustain the growth of women-owned or led businesses in southern Ontario’s digital media sector, Ideaboost, a digital entertainment accelerator, and VR Strategy, a program to develop virtual reality productions, and the UK-Canada Immersive Exchange, an immersive talent development lab and co-production fund for UK and Canadian artists and filmmakers.

== Work produced by CFC ==
CFC has been involved in hundreds of film, television, and interactive productions and has produced a large catalogue of works, including the below productions.

=== Features ===
CFC has supported the development of 47 feature films to date, including:

- 19 Months (Randall Cole)
- 22 Chaser (Rafal Sokolowski)
- Adventures in Public School (Kyle Rideout)
- The Art of Woo (Helen Lee)
- Beans (Tracey Deer)
- Blood and Donuts (Holly Dale)
- Cast No Shadow (Christian Sparkes)
- Closet Monster (Stephen Dunn)
- Clutch (Chris Grismer)
- Cruel & Unusual (Merlin Dervisevic)
- Cube (Vincenzo Natali)
- The Dark Hours (Paul Fox)
- Easy Land (Sanja Živković)
- Fairytales & Pornography (Chris Philpott)
- The Fishing Trip (Amnon Buchbinder)
- Horsie's Retreat (Tony Asimakopoulos)
- House (Laurie Lynd)
- Khaled (Asghar Massombagi)
- The Lockpicker (Randall Okita)
- Mary Goes Round (Molly McGlynn)
- Molly Maxwell (Sara St. Onge)
- Never Steady, Never Still (Kathleen Hepburn)
- Nurse.Fighter.Boy (Charles Officer)
- Old Stock (James Genn)
- Rhymes for Young Ghouls (Jeff Barnaby)
- Rude (Clement Virgo)
- Shoemaker (Colleen Murphy)
- Show Me (Cassandra Nicolaou)
- Siblings (David Weaver)
- Tammy's Always Dying (Amy Jo Johnson)
- Too Much Sex (Andrew Ainsworth)
- The Uncles (James Allodi)
- What We Have (Maxime Desmons)

CFC has also accelerated the development of various TV series, including:

- Mary Kills People
- Orphan Black
- Travelers

=== Short films ===
173 short films have been created through CFC's Short Dramatic Film Programs to date, including:

- Benjamin (Sherren Lee)
- Big Girl (Renuka Jeyapalan)
- Blue (Don McKellar)
- Cleo (Sanja Živković)
- Cold Feet (Daniel D'Alimonte)
- Elevated (Vincenzo Natali)
- Ernest (Keith Behrman)
- The Fairy Who Didn't Want to Be a Fairy Anymore (Laurie Lynd)
- The Feeler (Colleen Murphy)
- Frost (Jeremy Ball)
- The Home for Blind Women (Sandra Kybartas)
- How to Rid Your Lover of a Negative Emotion Caused By You! (Nadia Litz)
- Kumar and Mr. Jones (Sugith Varughese)
- Lunchbox Loser (Virginia Abramovich)
- Oliver Bump's Birthday (Jordan Canning)
- Prey (Helen Lee)
- Still (Slater Jewell-Kemker)
- We Wanted More (Stephen Dunn)
- What Doesn't Kill You (Rob Grant)

=== Digital media ===
CFC's interactive productions include:

- Late Fragment: Canada's first interactive feature film co-produced with the NFB.
- Body/Mind/Change: A transmedia experience starring David Cronenberg, co-produced with the Toronto International Film Festival (TIFF).
- What's Your Essential Cinema: A dynamic mobile visualization project co-produced with TIFF.
- VR Sketches Series: The first in a series of VR Sketches produced with Occupied VR, inviting the filmmaking community to learn about and discover the grammar and language of VR storytelling.
- Small Wonders: The VR Experience: Allows a user to immerse themselves inside a prayer bead and explore the intricate carvings made visible through the power of micro-computed tomography (micro-CT) and virtual reality. Produced by the Canadian Film Centre's Media Lab (CFC Media Lab) and Seneca College School of Creative Art & Animation, this artistic and technical collaboration between AGO conservateur, Lisa Ellis, and interactive artist and designer, Priam Givord (Seneca), marks the first time anyone will be able to move through, around and within one of these small wonders.
