= Erotica: A Journey Into Female Sexuality =

1997 Canadian documentary film

- Directed by: Maya Gallus
- Written by: Maya Gallus
- Produced by: Julia Sereny
- Cinematography: Zoe Dirse
- Edited by: Cathy Gulkin
- Production company: Sienna Films
- Release date: September 12, 1997 (TIFF)
- Running time: 75 minutes
- Country: Canada
- Language: English

Erotica: A Journey Into Female Sexuality is a Canadian documentary film, directed by Maya Gallus and released in 1997. The film explores the perspectives on sexuality of various women involved in the production and release of both heterosexual and lesbian erotica and pornography, including performance artist Annie Sprinkle, filmmaker Candida Royalle, writers Susie Bright and Catherine Robbe-Grillet, photographer Bettina Rheims and novelist Anne Desclos. The film was the last interview Desclos gave during her lifetime.

The film premiered in the Perspective Canada program at the 1997 Toronto International Film Festival. It was broadcast on television in 1999, as an episode of TVOntario's documentary series The View from Here, although seven minutes of sexually explicit footage were removed from the television broadcast. It was later broadcast in its unedited original form on the LGBT-focused premium cable channel PrideVision.

The film received a Genie Award nomination for Best Feature Length Documentary at the 18th Genie Awards.
