= Roshell Bissett =

Canadian independent filmmaker

Roshell Bissett (born 1968) is a Canadian independent filmmaker who wrote and directed several short films, including the award-winning Cotton Candy, and one feature-length film entitled Winter Lily.

== Career ==
Born and raised in Ottawa, Ontario, she was educated at the University of Ottawa and Concordia University. She began making films in the early 1990s including the short films Blue Canary 1991, Stella Signata in 1993 and Eating Noodles by the Mekong in 1994.

Her most significant film, Cotton Candy, was shot in Tokyo in 1995 and went on to receive the awards for Best Canadian Short Film at the Toronto International Film Festival in 1997, and Best Short Film at the New York Underground Film Festival in 1998. In 1998 she directed and co-wrote the feature film Winter Lily.

She taught film production for a short time at the Mel Hoppenheim School of Cinema at Concordia University.
