= Vox Popular Media Arts Festival =

Canadian film festival

Coordinates: 48°25′56″N 89°13′48″W

- Location: Thunder Bay, Ontario, Canada
- Language: English
- Website: Official website

The Vox Popular Media Arts Festival, formerly known as the Bay Street Film Festival, is an annual film and arts festival staged in Thunder Bay, Ontario.

First established in 2005 by Kelly Saxberg and Ron Harpelle, the festival's mission was to feature local, national, and international films with the theme "films for the people". The festival was sponsored by Flash Frame, a local film and video network, and was originally held on 314 Bay Street in the historic Finnish Labour Temple in the heart of the city's Finnish quarter.

The 2017 festival was the last to be held under the Bay Street Film Festival name. It relaunched in 2018 as the Vox Popular Media Arts Festival, expanding its programming to include theatrical performance, music and installation art presentations.
