= Maya Gallus =

Canadian documentary filmmaker

Maya Gallus is a Canadian documentary filmmaker, and co-founder of Red Queen Productions with Justine Pimlott.

Her films have been screened at international film festivals, including Toronto International Film Festival, Montreal World Film Festival, Hot Docs Canadian International Documentary Festival, Sheffield Doc/Fest, SEOUL International Women’s Film Festival, Singapore International Film Festival, This Human World Film Festival (Vienna) and Women Make Waves (Taiwan), among others. Her work has also screened at the Museum of Fine Arts (Boston), Donostia Kultura, San Sebastián and Canada House UK, as well as theatrically in Tokyo, San Francisco, Key West and Toronto, and been broadcast around the world. She has won numerous awards, including a Gemini Award for Best Direction for Girl Inside, and has been featured in The Guardian, UK; Ms. (Magazine), Curve (Magazine), Bust (Magazine), Salon (Magazine), POV and The Walrus, among others. She is a Director/Writer alumna of the Canadian Film Centre and a participant in Women in the Director’s Chair. She will be honoured with a "Focus On" retrospective at the 2017 Hot Docs festival.

She is the daughter of artist Agnes Gallus.

== Filmography ==
Release	Film	Description
1993	The Very Dead of Winter (Director/Writer)	A family grapples with the death of the father.
1991	Elizabeth Smart: On the Side of the Angels (Director/Writer)	The life and work of Canadian writer Elizabeth Smart, author of By Grand Central Station I Sat Down and Wept.
1997	Barbara Ann Scott: Queen of the Blades (Director)	A portrait of the Olympic Champion figure skater, known as "Canada’s sweetheart".
1997	Erotica: A Journey Into Female Sexuality (Director)	An exploration of women’s erotica, featuring the final interview with Story of O author Pauline Réage as well as Annie Sprinkle, Candida Royalle, Bettina Rheims, Catherine Robbe Grillet and others.
1997	A Tale of Two Sisters (Director)	A portrait of Canadian stage and screen actors Jennifer and Cynthia Dale.
1998	Full Circle: The Untold Story of the Dionne Quintuplets (Director)	A portrait of the surviving adult Dionne Quintuplets, Cécile, Yvonne and Annette.
2005	Fag Hags: Women Who Love Gay Men (Producer/Writer)	A documentary that explores the complexity of love and friendship between women and gay men.
2009	Cat City (co-producer)	A moving documentary that takes the viewer to the frontlines of the cat overpopulation crisis.
2010	Dish-Women, Waitressing & the Art of Service (Director/Writer)	From classic North American diners and Montreal’s "sexy restos" to Paris’s haute eateries and Tokyo’s maid cafes.
2012	The Mystery of Mazo de la Roche (Director/Writer)	The life and work of Canadian writer Mazo de la Roche, author of Jalna and the Whiteoak Chronicles.
2013	Derby Crazy Love (Co-Director)	The third wave feminist revival of women’s roller derby and the subculture around the sport.
2018	The Heat: A Kitchen (R)evolution	The film profiles several women chefs, exploring the sexist double standards in the restaurant industry that get women sidelined, or stigmatized as "difficult", if they are as ambitious or assertive as their male peers.
2023	Crush: Message in a Bottle	A growing movement of winegrowers and winemakers are using eco-conscious practices to reduce their carbon footprint, merging modern and traditional techniques to infuse their craft with authenticity.

== Awards and nominations ==
Atlantic Film Festival

- 1997: Best Narration: Elizabeth Smart: On The Side of the Angels

Gemini Awards

- 1992: Best Direction in a Documentary - Elizabeth Smart: On The Side of the Angels (Nomination)

Genie Awards

- 1998: Best Documentary: Erotica: A Journey Into Female Sexuality (Nomination)

Hot Docs

- 1998: Best Arts Documentary: Erotica: A Journey Into Female Sexuality (Nomination)

Yorkton Film Festival, Golden Sheaf Awards

- 1991: Best Production: Elizabeth Smart: On The Side of the Angels (Award)
- 1991: Best Documentary: Elizabeth Smart: On The Side of the Angels (Award)
- 1991: Best Editing: Elizabeth Smart: On The Side of the Angels (Award)

For additional awards - see Red Queen Productions
