= Unmade Beds (1997 film) =

- Directed by: Nicholas Barker
- Written by: Nicholas Barker
- Produced by: Sam Bickley; Gretchen McGowan; Michael Porte; Steve Wax
- Starring: Aimee Copp; Michael De Stefano; Brenda Monte; Mikey Russo
- Cinematography: William Rexer
- Edited by: Paul Binns
- Distributed by: Chelsea Pictures
- Release date: 10 September 1997; (Toronto International Film Festival)
- Running time: 95 minutes
- Country: United States
- Language: English
- Box office: $75,7526

Unmade Beds is a 1997 art house film by the British director Nicholas Barker set in the United States. It shows the lives of four New York singles, playing themselves.

It won the Bronze Horse prize for best 1997 feature film in the Stockholm International Film Festival.
