= Sabriya =

- Directed by: Abderrahmane Sissako
- Written by: Abderrahmane Sissako
- Produced by: Dora Fourati
- Release date: 1997
- Running time: 26'
- Countries: Mali; Tunisia

Sabriya is a 1997 film.

Sabriya is part of the project "Africa Dreaming", a chronicle of Africa in six acts, six contemporary stories which share the theme of love. They are psychological of social dramas presented in the specific cultural and traditional contexts of each of the six countries represented: South Africa, Zimbabwe, Namibia, Mozambique, Mauritania and Senegal.

== Synopsis ==
The film explores the impact of the modern world on the traditional male society of the Maghreb. It is a film about men who prefer to live life as an abstract game and the free-spirited woman who changes all that.
