= Sylvain Guy =

Canadian screenwriter and film director

Sylvain Guy is a Canadian screenwriter and film director from Quebec. He is most noted for the 2004 film Machine Gun Molly (Monica la mitraille), for which he and Luc Dionne won the Genie Award for Best Adapted Screenplay at the 25th Genie Awards in 2005. He was also previously nominated in the same category for Black List (Liste noire) at the 16th Genie Awards in 1996, and subsequently at the 10th Canadian Screen Awards in 2022 for Confessions of a Hitman (Confessions).

His first film as a director, the short film Zie 37 Stagen, was a Genie nominee for Best Live Action Short Drama at the 18th Genie Awards in 1997. His feature film debut, The List, was an English-language remake of Liste noire.

He subsequently directed the feature films Detour (2009) and The Ultimate Pranx Case (2012), and wrote the screenplays for the films Louis Cyr, Mafia Inc., Confessions of a Hitman and Victoire (La Cordonnière).

In 2020 he was announced as the writer of a forthcoming biopic of Quebec singer Diane Dufresne.

He wrote the 2023 television series Mégantic.
