= Under the Weather (1997 film) =

- French: À l'ombre
- Directed by: Tali Prévost
- Produced by: Pierre Hébert; Yves Leduc
- Music by: René Lussier
- Production company: National Film Board of Canada
- Release date: 1997
- Running time: 6 minutes
- Country: Canada

Under the Weather (French: À l'ombre) is a Canadian animated short film, directed by Tali Prévost and released in 1997. The film centres on a group of people who are happily enjoying the beach in cloudy weather, but run to take shelter as soon as the sun comes out.

The film was a Genie Award nominee for Best Animated Short Film at the 18th Genie Awards in 1997.
