= Women Make Waves =

Film festival in Taiwan

Women Makes Waves (also known as Women Make Waves International Film Festival) is a film festival based in Taiwan since 1993. It is the first and only women's film festival in the country, and has established itself as the biggest one dedicated to supporting female talents.

In 1993, the inaugural Women Make Waves, jointly organized by the Awakening Foundation and B&W Film Studio, was the predecessor of Women Make Waves Int'l Film Festival Taiwan. In Chinese Women's Cinema: Transnational Contexts, edited by Lingzhen Wang, it is noted that the initial event at the Huo K'o Gallery in Taipei was literally called the Women's Visual Arts Festival (女性影像藝術展). In 2000, Women Make Waves was renamed as Women Make Waves Film/Video Festival. This marked the first time the film festival hosted screenings at the cinema. The film festival expanded significantly, solidifying itself as one of the major cultural events. In 2012, the film festival was officially renamed as Women Make Waves Int'l Film Festival Taiwan.

In 1998, as the film festival entered its 5th edition, gender studies and discourses had become prominent in Taiwan. To ensure the prospect of the film festival, Taipei Women's Film Association was founded in September of the same year. Huang Yu-shan was the first chairwoman of the Association. In 2001, the film festival established the model of nation-wide film tours, marking one of the first film festivals to do so in Taiwan, with the aim of reducing the urban-rural divide in access to cinema. It has jointly held screenings with local theaters, organizations, universities, educational institutions, and cultural venues, in order to reduce rural-urban differences and promote gender equity through films beyond Taipei.

Regarding other gender-related film festival in Asia, since 2005, there is also an annual Asian Lesbian Film and Video Festival in Taipei, and since 2014, the annual Taiwan International Queer Film Festival (TIQFF), the only LGBTQ film festival in Taiwan, which has screenings every autumn in Taipei and two other major cities.

The film festival has screened nearly one thousand international and Taiwanese films, specialising in films of a feminist perspective, moving beyond the mainstream outlook to focus on voices and issues that are often unheard, explored and delighted in. The organization is also involved in distribution of films and books; it works in education and video training. The members of TWFA are mainly filmmakers, artists and academics of film or gender studies. Highlights from the film festival have also gone on an international tour including to New York.

== See also ==
- Cinema of Taiwan
- List of women's film festivals
