= I Need a Man Like You to Make My Dreams Come True =

1986 Canadian short film

- Directed by: Kalli Paakspuu; Daria Stermac
- Produced by: Kalli Paakspuu; Daria Stermac
- Starring: Sheila Costick; Helen Porter; Louise Garfield; Janice Hladki; Johanna Householder
- Cinematography: Jim Crowe
- Edited by: Cathy Culkin
- Music by: Marc Choletti
- Distributed by: Women Make Movies
- Release date: 1986
- Running time: 24 minutes
- Country: Canada
- Language: English

I Need a Man Like You to Make My Dreams Come True is a Canadian short film, directed by Kalli Paakspuu and Daria Stermac and released in 1986. Mixing performance art segments by Sheila Costick and Helen Porter with musical comedy interludes performed by The Clichettes (Louise Garfield, Janice Hladki and Johanna Householder), the film presents a satirical look at gender roles.

The film won the Genie Award for Best Live Action Short Drama at the 8th Genie Awards.
