= Robin Cass =

Canadian film and television producer

Cass at the Hot Docs Premiere of As Slow as Possible

Robin Cass is a Canadian film and television producer. He is most noted as the producer of John Greyson's film Lilies, which won the Genie Award for Best Picture at the 17th Genie Awards in 1996. He has also been a supervising producer for the CBC TV series Kim's Convenience.

A graduate of the Ontario College of Art and Design, he joined with Louise Garfield and Anna Stratton in 1994 to form Triptych Media. The company's other productions have included the films Falling Angels, The Republic of Love, Zero Patience and The Hanging Garden, and the television dramas Lucky Girl, The Tale of Teeka and Heyday!

In 2020, he founded Cass & Co, a production company based in Vancouver. Projects in development include an adaptation of Waubgeshig Rice's novel Moon of The Crusted Snow, and a docu-series based on Brian Goldman's non-fiction book The Power of Kindness.

== Filmography ==
- Lilies - Les feluettes (1996, producer)
- Falling Angels (2003, producer)
- Heyday! (2006, producer)
- Amal (2007, executive producer)
- Emotional Arithmetic (2007, executive producer)
- As Slow as Possible (2008, producer)
- High Life (2009, producer)
- Down the Road Again (2011)
- Kim's Convenience (2016–17, supervising producer)
