= Arnie Gelbart =

Arnie Gelbart is a Belgian-Canadian film and television producer, who founded the Galafilm studio in 1990.

Born in Brussels and raised in Montreal, Quebec, he began his career in film as an assistant director on Luis Buñuel's 1972 film The Discreet Charm of the Bourgeoisie. He was a co-founder of Cleo 24 in the 1980s, before launching Galafilm in 1990.

He has produced both narrative and documentary film and television. His most noted productions have included the Gemini Award-winning documentary series The Valour and the Horror, and the film Lilies, a Genie Award winner for Best Motion Picture. He has also been a screenwriter, most notably on the films Bayo and The Gunrunner, and has directed a number of short documentary films.

He was inducted as a member of the Order of Canada in 2024.

== Awards ==
Award	Year	Category	Work	Result	Ref
Canadian Screen Awards	2014	Best Documentary Series	The Beat with Daniel Morin	Nominated	
Canadian Screen Awards	2022	Donald Brittain Award	Ghosts of Afghanistan with Julian Sher, Natalie Dubois	Won	
Gemini Awards	1993	Best Documentary Series	The Valour and the Horror with André Lamy	Won	
Gemini Awards	1995	Donald Brittain Award	The Voyage of the St. Louis	Nominated	
Gemini Awards	1999	Best Short Drama	The Tale of Teeka with Anna Stratton	Nominated	
Gemini Awards	2000	Best Science, Technology, Nature, Environment or Adventure Documentary Program	After Darwin	Won	
Gemini Awards	2000	Best History/Biography Documentary Program	The Viking Saga: The Era of the Long Ships with Bo G. Ericson, Lars Rengfelt	Nominated	
Gemini Awards	2002	Best Drama Series	Bliss with Janis Lundman, Adrienne Mitchell, Ian Whitehead	Nominated	
Gemini Awards	2002	Best Biography Documentary Program	Ted Allan: Minstrel Boy of the 20th Century with Adam Symansky, Sally Bochner, Elizabeth Klinck	Nominated	
Gemini Awards	2003	Best Reality Program or Series	Cirque du Soleil: Fire Within with Marie Côté, Vincent Gagné	Won	
Gemini Awards	2003	Best History Documentary Program	Chiefs: The Trial of Poundmaker with Richard Elson	Nominated	
Gemini Awards	2004	Best Drama Series	Bliss with Janis Lundman, Ian Whitehead, Adrienne Mitchell	Nominated	
Gemini Awards	2005	Best TV Movie	Tripping the Wire: A Stephen Tree Mystery with Francine Allaire, Anne Marie La Traverse	Won	
Gemini Awards	2005	Best Science, Technology, Nature, Environment or Adventure Documentary Program	The Origins of AIDS with Michel Crepon, Christine Le Goff, Christine Pereaux	Won	
Gemini Awards	2005	Best Children's or Youth Fiction Program or Series	15/Love with Jesse Fawcett, Derek Schreyer, Olivier Brémond, Karen Troubetzkoy, Pascal Breton, Leanna Crouch	Nominated	
Gemini Awards	2005	Best Children's or Youth Fiction Program or Series	Fungus the Bogeyman; Ian Whitehead, Dan Maddicott, Michael Haggiag	Nominated	
Gemini Awards	2005	Best Writing in a Documentary Program or Series	The Origins of AIDS with Peter Chappell, Stéphane Horel	Nominated	
Gemini Awards	2006	Best TV Movie	Hunt for Justice with Francine Allaire, Randy Holleschau, Anne Marie La Traverse, Christine Ruppert	Won	
Gemini Awards	2006	Donald Brittain Award	Big Sugar with Sylvia Wilson, Stephen Phizicky	Nominated	
Gemini Awards	2006	Best Children’s or Youth Fiction Program or Series	15/Love with Derek Schreyer, Olivier Brémond, Karen Troubetzkoy, Pascal Breton	Nominated	
Gemini Awards	2007	Best Performing Arts Program or Series, or Arts Documentary Program or Series	Cirque du Soleil: Lovesick with Valérie Beaugrand-Champagne, Vincent Gagné, Martin Bolduc	Won	
Gemini Awards	2007	Best History Documentary Program	The Great War: The Complete History of WWI with Natalie Dubois, Stephen Phizicky, Janet Torge, Brian McKenna	Nominated	
Gemini Awards	2010	Best History Documentary Program	Paris 1919 with Gerry Flahive, Silva Basmajian, Paul Saadoun	Won	
Genie Awards	1996	Best Motion Picture	Lilies with Robin Cass, Anna Stratton	Won	
Genie Awards	1997	Best Motion Picture	The Hanging Garden with Thom Fitzgerald, Louise Garfield	Nominated	
Emmy Awards	2003	Outstanding Nonfiction Program (Alternative)	Cirque du Soleil: Fire Within with Christian Barcellos, Martin Bolduc, Marie Côté, Vincent Gagné, Amy Introcaso-Davis, Sylvia Wilson	Won	
