= High Life (2009 film) =

2009 film by Gary Yates

- Directed by: Gary Yates
- Written by: Lee MacDougall
- Produced by: Robin Cass; Gary Yates; Liz Jarvis (co-producer); Avi Federgreen (co-producer); Anna Stratton (executive); Morris Ruskin (executive)
- Starring: Timothy Olyphant; Stephen Eric McIntyre; Joe Anderson; Rossif Sutherland
- Music by: Jonathan Goldsmith
- Distributed by: Union Pictures
- Release dates: 17 February 2009 (Berlinale); 15 January 2010 (Canada)
- Running time: 80 minutes
- Country: Canada
- Language: English

High Life is a 2009 Canadian film based on the stage play by Lee MacDougall, written by Lee MacDougall and directed by Gary Yates. Starring Timothy Olyphant, Stephen Eric McIntyre, Joe Anderson and Rossif Sutherland, High Life is a comedic heist movie from the flip-side of the '80s consumer dream.

== Plot ==
In 1983, a visit from his former sociopathic cellmate Bug (Stephen Eric McIntyre) has led to Dick (Timothy Olyphant) being fired from his job as a hospital janitor. Unemployed and in need of fast cash Dick gets the idea to rob one of the brand new ATMs, to "buy a little self-respect," as Dick announces to Bug and the team. Enter the charismatic, criminally-minded Donnie (Joe Anderson), and the front-man, the sexy, sleepy-eyed charmer Billy (Rossif Sutherland), and all of the pieces are in place. "It's a precision job," says Dick the night before the heist: "No violence."

Things do not go according to plan and the unfolding catalogue of disasters that confronts Dick is enough to test any friend's loyalties as they bungle their way toward a pipe-dream of quick riches.

== Cast ==
- Timothy Olyphant as Dick
- Stephen Eric McIntyre as Bug
- Joe Anderson as Donnie
- Rossif Sutherland as Billy
- Mark McKinney as Jeremy
- Doreen Brownstone as Cheesecake Woman

== Awards ==
- Calgary International Film Festival – Best Canadian Feature
