= Joan Orenstein =

Canadian actress (1923–2009)

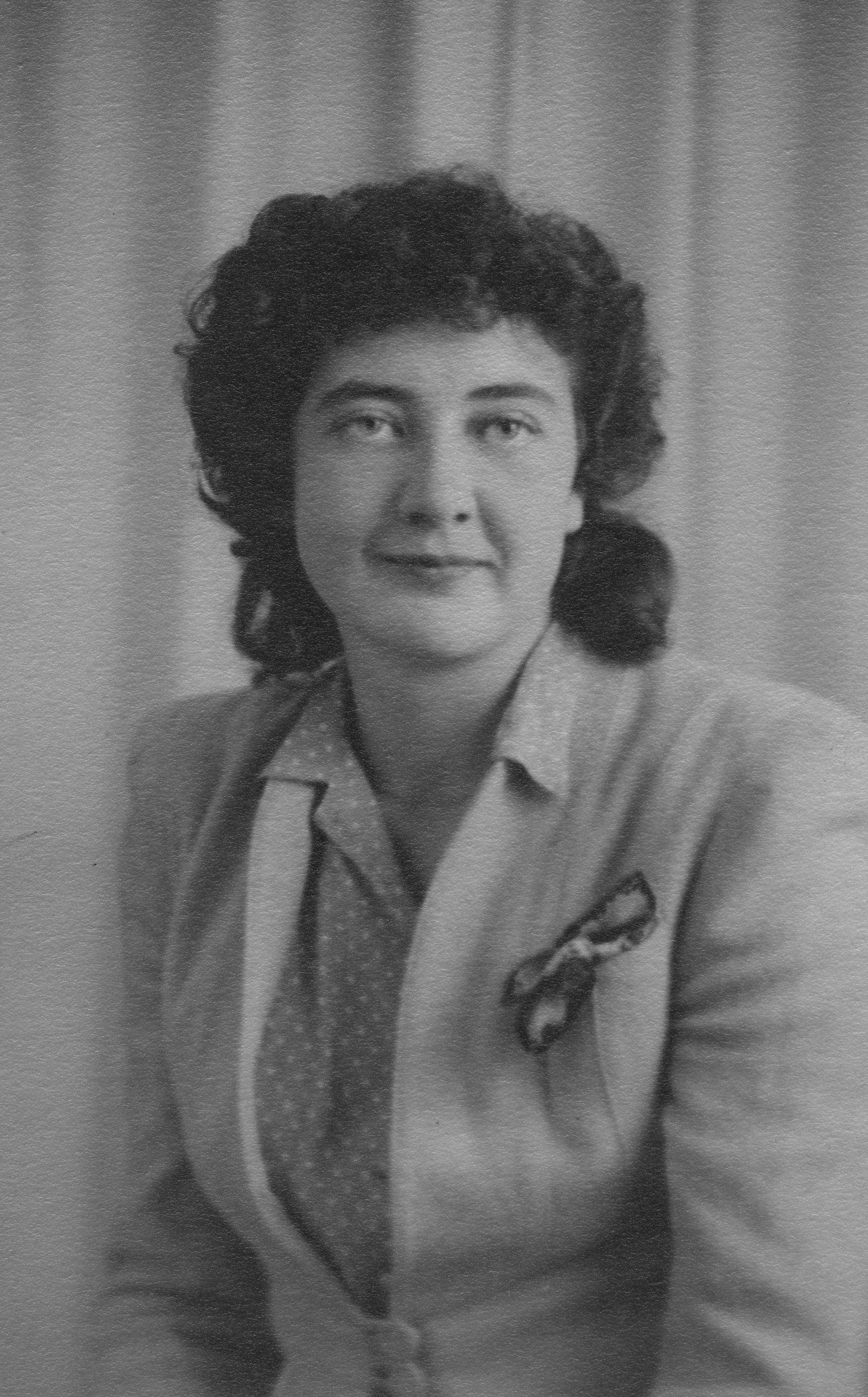
- Joan Orenstein in the 1940s
- Born: Joan Travell; December 4, 1923; London, England, UK
- Died: October 10, 2009 (aged 85)
- Occupation: Actor
- Spouse(s): Henry Orenstein; five daughters

Joan Orenstein (born Travell December 4, 1923 – October 10, 2009) was a British-born Canadian actress, primarily on stage, although she performed in other media. One of her best-known roles was in the 1997 film The Hanging Garden as the dotty old grandmother, Grace.

== Acting career ==
Joan Travell was born on December 4, 1923 in London, and emigrated to Canada in the 1940s after World War II.

She acted across Canada but mostly acted for Halifax's Neptune Theatre. She also performed lead roles on most of the major Canadian stages, including the Centaur Theatre, the National Arts Centre, the Belfry Theatre, the Tarragon Theatre, Theatre Calgary, the Shaw Festival, the Canadian Stage and the Manitoba Theatre Centre. She also performed on television, in film, on radio and in the recording industry.

== Personal life and death ==
Travell was married to Henry Orenstein, an artist and CBC production designer. They had five daughters, including actress Sarah Orenstein, a Dora Award winner, dancer Cia Tweel, designer Edie Orenstein, and flautist Ruth Orenstein.

She died to

== Awards ==
=== Atlantic Film Festival ===
- Atlantic Canadian Award Best Acting - Female (winner) for: The Hanging Garden (1997)
- Atlantic Canadian Award Outstanding Performance by an Actress (winner) for: The Event (2003)

=== Genie Awards ===
- Genie Best Performance by an Actress in a Supporting Role (nominated) for: The Hanging Garden (1997)

== Theatre work ==
- Centaur Theatre
  - Juno and the Paycock
  - People Are Living There
  - Stone Angel
  - Road to Mecca
  - Albertine in Five Times
  - La Sagouine
- National Arts Centre
  - Waiting for the Parade
  - Mother Courage
  - Ghosts
- Neptune Theatre
  - Forever Yours
  - Marie-Lou
  - Memories of You
- Canadian Stage
  - Odd Jobs
- Belfry Theatre
  - The Magnificent Voyage of Emily Carr
  - If We Are Women
- Tarragon Theatre
  - Mrs. Klein (with daughter Sarah Orenstein)
- Theatre Calgary
  - Transit of Venus
- Shaw Festival
  - Mrs. Warren's Profession
  - Hedda Gabler
- Manitoba Theatre Centre
  - night, Mother
- Vancouver East Cultural Centre
  - Song of this Place (with daughter Sarah Orenstein)

== Filmography ==
- Charlie Grant's War - 1985
- Henry & Verlin - 1994
- Never Too Late - 1996
- The Hanging Garden - 1997
- Emily of New Moon: Eye of Heaven & Storms of the Heart - 1998
- Emily of New Moon: Paradise Lost & The Enchanted Doll - 1998
- Emily of New Moon: The Wild Rover, The Ghost of Whyther Grange & A Child Shall Lead Them - 1998
- Emily of New Moon: A Winter's Tale & The Sound of Silence - 1998
- Baba's House - 2002
- Shattered City: The Halifax Explosion - 2003
- The Event - 2003
- Hunger Point - 2003
