= Gabriel Carrer =

Canadian filmmaker (born 1981)

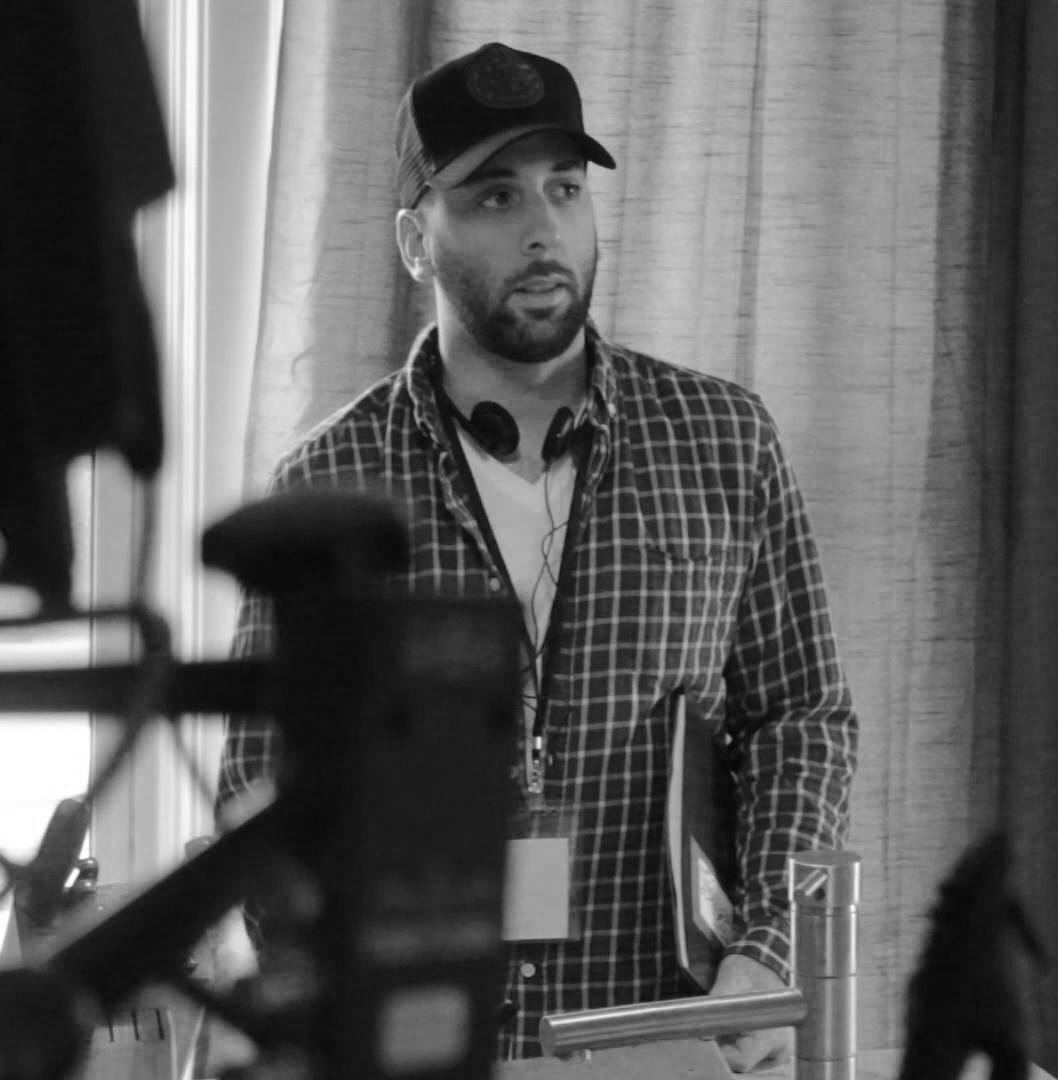
- Born: 21 May 1981 (age 44); Guelph, Ontario, Canada
- Occupations: Film director, screenwriter, producer
- Years active: 2004–present
- Notable work: Death Cycle (2026); Underbelly (2023); For the Sake of Vicious (2020); The Demolisher (2015)
- Awards: Silver Audience Award for Best Canadian Feature - The Demolisher at the Fantasia International Film Festival

Gabriel Carrer is a film director and screenwriter who helmed the 2010 underground horror success If a Tree Falls (Raven Banner Entertainment), which premiered at the Fantasia International Film Festival. He returned to Fantasia in 2015 with The Demolisher (Darksky Films), winning the Silver Audience Award, and gained acclaim at festivals worldwide (Vancouver International Film Festival, Sitges, Hardline, Toronto After Dark Film & Feratum). In 2020, he composed the score and co-directed the film, For the Sake of Vicious (Epic Pictures). Carrer returned to Fantasia a third time for its world premiere and it continued to play a series of festivals such as Frightfest, Macabro, Hardline, Telluride Horror Show, Bucheon International Fantastic Film Festival and Sitges. Other directing credits include In the House of Flies (2012), featuring punk rock icon Henry Rollins as "The Voice" and Death on Scenic Drive (2017).

== Career ==
=== 2003 – 2010 ===
During the span of seven years, Carrer was hired by Kevin Zinger, a producer and media entrepreneur based in San Diego, California. During this time Carrer travelled in a van, shot and directed nearly 50 music videos across Los Angeles and North America for Zinger's management company Regime72 and record label Suburban Noise Records. Some of the artists included Eyes Set to Kill, Swollen Members, Kottonmouth Kings, Unwritten Law, X-Clan and Hed p.e.

Prior to directing music videos, Carrer made his directorial debut with film director Chad Archibald at the age of twenty-three with their ultra low budget horror film Desperate Souls (2004). The film was later released by Alliance Atlantis (Canada) and Lions Gate Films (U.S). Soon after the release, Carrer and Archibald co-directed another film called Kill (2005), which featured much of the same cast from Desperate Souls. The film was nearly lost due to the digital footage being damaged, but was recovered and had a late release by Troma Entertainment.

The third film Carrer helmed shortly after was entitled If A Tree Falls (2010), written by Ry Barrett. It had its world premiere at the Fantasia International Film Festival. The film was picked up and released internationally by Raven Banner Entertainment.

=== 2010 – 2015 ===
In 2011, Carrer directed the claustrophobic thriller In the House of Flies, featuring punk rock icon and social commentator Henry Rollins as "The Voice".

Following the tense thriller, Gabriel wrote and directed The Demolisher (2015). The film won the Silver Audience Award at the Fantasia International Film Festival where it had its world premiere, and won Best Director at the Fantastic Planet Film Festival in Australia. The film also premiered at SITGES, the Vancouver International Film Festival and the Toronto After Dark Film Festival.

=== 2015 - present ===
Carrer was hired to direct a new documentary called Underbelly (2022). The documentary explored the adventure underground of the world's leading urban artists, such as Ron English, Swoon, Faile, Revok, and Shepard Fairey. The documentary contains archival footage spanning over a decade.

In late 2020, Canadian producer Avi Federgreen and Raven Banner Entertainment produced For the Sake of Vicious, which was co-directed by Gabriel Carrer and Reese Eveneshen. The film had its world premiere at the Fantasia International Film Festival, and was picked up by Epic Pictures and released under its branch Dread Presents for North America.

== Filmography ==
=== Feature films ===
- 2004: Desperate Souls
- 2005: Kill
- 2010: If a Tree Falls
- 2012: In the House of Flies
- 2016: Demolisher
- 2017: Death On Scenic Drive
- 2021: For the Sake of Vicious
- 2023: Underbelly
- 2026: Death Cycle
