= 17th Genie Awards =

1996 Canadian film awards ceremony

- Date: November 27, 1996
- Site: The Guvernment; Toronto, Ontario
- Hosted by: Rebecca Jenkins; Mark Farrell

Highlights
- Best Picture: Lilies
- Most nominations: Lilies

Television coverage
- Network: CBC Television

The 17th Genie Awards were held on November 27, 1996, to honour films released in late 1995 and 1996.

They were the second Genie Award ceremony held in that year; the 16th Genie Awards were delayed from the fall of 1995 and took place in January 1996 instead.

For these awards, due to having only a one-hour time slot on CBC Television, the academy divided the ceremony shows into a taped portion and a live portion. The one hour Genie special featured the five Best Motion Picture nominees and actors, and included the winners of the taped pre-show. For the Quebec market, on the following evening, there was a 30-minute Genies special on Radio-Canada which focused on the year's winners. The awards were dominated by three films which had caused much excitement over the past year; David Cronenberg's Crash, John Greyson's Lilies and, from Robert Lepage, Le Polygraphe. Still, as expected, the ratings for these shows, which were hosted by actress Rebecca Jenkins and comedian Mark Farrell, were low.

== Award winners and nominees ==
Motion Picture	Direction
Lilies — Robin Cass, Arnie Gelbart, Anna Stratton; Crash — David Cronenberg; Hard Core Logo — Brian Dennis, Christine Haebler; Long Day's Journey into Night — Niv Fichman, Daniel Iron; Polygraph (Le Polygraphe) — Philippe Carcassonne, Bruno Jobin, Jean-Pierre St-Michel, Ulrich Felsberg	David Cronenberg, Crash; John Fawcett, The Boys Club; John Greyson, Lilies; Robert Lepage, Polygraph (Le Polygraphe); Bruce McDonald, Hard Core Logo
Actor in a leading role	Actress in a leading role
William Hutt, Long Day's Journey into Night; Jason Cadieux, Lilies; Matthew Ferguson, Lilies; Danny Gilmore, Lilies; Tom McCamus, Long Day's Journey into Night; Christopher Penn, The Boys Club	Martha Henry, Long Day's Journey into Night; Marie Brassard, Polygraph (Le Polygraphe); Helene Clarkson, Blood & Donuts; Brenda Fricker, Swann; Louise Portal, Not Me! (Sous-sol)
Actor in a supporting role	Actress in a supporting role
Peter Donaldson, Long Day's Journey into Night; Alexander Chapman, Lilies; James Hyndman, Rowing Through; Sean McCann, Swann; Ron White, Screamers	Martha Burns, Long Day's Journey into Night; Marie-Andrée Corneille, Mistaken Identity (Erreur sur la personne); Josée Deschênes, Polygraph (Le Polygraphe); Maria de Medeiros, Polygraph (Le Polygraphe); Manon Miclette, Love Me, Love Me Not (J'aime, j'aime pas)
Original Screenplay	Adapted Screenplay
Pierre Gang, Not Me! (Sous-sol); Gilles Carle, Poor Man's Pudding (Pudding chômeur); Donald Martin, Never Too Late; Andrew Rai Berzins, Blood and Donuts; Peter Wellington and Doug Smith, The Boys Club	David Cronenberg, Crash; Noel S. Baker, Hard Core Logo; Michel Marc Bouchard and Linda Gaboriau, Lilies; John L'Ecuyer, Curtis's Charm; Robert Lepage and Marie Brassard, Polygraph (Le Polygraphe)
Best Feature Length Documentary	Best Short Documentary
Heather Frise and Velcrow Ripper, Bones of the Forest; Diane Cailhier and Alain Chartrand, My Life Is a River (Une vie comme rivière); Magnus Isacsson, Power; Peter Lynch, Project Grizzly	Daniele Caloz and Paul Carrière, Mum's the Word (Maman et Ève); Brenda Longfellow, A Balkan Journey: Fragments from the Other Side of War
Art Direction/Production Design	Cinematography
Sandra Kybartas, Lilies; John Dondertman, Swann; Perri Gorrara, Screamers; Paola Ridolfi, Never Too Late; Taavo Soodor, The Boys Club	Peter Suschitzky, Crash; Sylvain Brault, Rowing Through; Éric Cayla, A Cry in the Night (Le Cri de la nuit); Georges Dufaux, Polygraph (Le Polygraphe); Daniel Jobin, Lilies
Costume Design	Editing
Linda Muir, Lilies; Elisbetta Beraldo, Swann; Emma England, Blood and Donuts; Denis Sperdouklis, Poor Man's Pudding (Pudding chômeur); Delphine White, Kids in the Hall: Brain Candy	Ronald Sanders, Crash; André Corriveau, Lilies; Reginald Harkema, Hard Core Logo; Susan Maggi, The Boys Club; Susan Shipton, Long Day's Journey into Night
Overall Sound	Sound Editing
Don Cohen, Keith Elliot, Scott Purdy, Scott Shepherd and Don White, Lilies; David Appleby, D. Bruce Carwardine, Tim O'Connell and Don White, Kids in the Hall: Brain Candy; Jo Caron, Claude Hazanavicius, John Netsorwich and Hans Peter Strobl, Polygraph (Le Polygraphe); Kelly Cole, Dam Giammarco, Jochen Schlissler and Paul Sharpe, Hard Core Logo; Christian Cooke, David Lee, Dino Pigat, Lou Solakofski and Orest Sushko, Crash	Tom Bjelic, David Evans, Wayne Griffin, John Laing, Andy Malcolm, Dale Sheldrake and John Douglas Smith, Crash; Fred Brennan, Yann Delpeuch, Paula Fairfield and Virginia Storey, House; Fred Brennan, Sue Conley, Yuri Gorbachow, Andy Malcolm, Jane Tattersall and David McCallum, Kids in the Hall: Brain Candy; Diane Boucher, Tony Currie, Rich Harkness, Janice Ierulli, Donna Powell and Jane Tattersall, Lilies; Jerome Decarie, Serge Fortin, Jean-Pierre Pinard, Mario Rodrigue and Raymond Vermette, Polygraph (Le Polygraphe)
Achievement in Music: Original Score	Achievement in Music: Original Song
Mark Korven, Curtis's Charm; Richard Rodney Bennett, Swann; Normand Corbeil, Screamers; Mychael Danna, Lilies; Ron Sures, Joe's So Mean to Josephine	Michael Turner, Swamp Baby and Peter J. Moore, "Who the Hell Do You Think You Are?" — Hard Core Logo; Steven Drake, Bruce McCulloch and Craig Northey, "Some Days It's Dark" — Kids in the Hall: Brain Candy; Michael Timmins, "House on the Horizon" — House
Best Short Film	Special Awards
The Home for Blind Women — Sandra Kybartas; Curtains (Rideau) — Mark Morgenstern and Stephanie Morgenstern; The Feeler — Colleen Murphy	Claude Jutra Award: Peter Wellington, Joe's So Mean to Josephine; Golden Reel Award: Crash
