= Avi Federgreen =

Canadian film producer

Avi Federgreen is a Canadian film director and producer based in Toronto, Ontario.

Born and raised in Edmonton, Alberta, he began his career as a location and production manager, In the 2000s he began producing feature films and television series, before launching his own distribution firm, Indiecan Entertainment, in 2011 to improve distribution opportunities for independent Canadian film. Around the same time, he launched the Federgreen Entertainment studio.

Projects spearheaded by Federgreen through Indiecan have included the Indiecan 10K and 20K Challenges to solicit and produce screenplays by first-time filmmakers, an international sales division to increase business opportunities for Canadian independent films in foreign markets, and a division to distribute LGBTQ films. In 2019, Federgreen also acquired Anna Stratton's Triptych Media.

In 2020 he made his own debut as a film director with the short film Red Balloon, and subsequently directed television films and television episodes before making his theatrical feature debut with Home Free in 2024.

== Filmography ==
- It's Me...Gerald - 2005
- Heyday! - 2006, line producer
- Northern Town - 2006, line producer
- The Altar Boy Gang - 2007, line producer
- All Hat - 2007, line producer
- Emotional Arithmetic - 2007, associate producer
- Rabbit Fall - 2007-08
- As Slow As Possible - 2008
- Pudge - 2008
- One Week - 2008, line producer
- High Life - 2009
- Leslie, My Name Is Evil - 2009
- Hungry Hills - 2009
- Score: A Hockey Musical - 2010
- Bagged - 2010
- She Said Lenny - 2010
- Little Larry - 2011, executive producer
- Good Dog - 2011
- I'm Yours - 2011
- Moon Point - 2011, executive producer
- Hidden Driveway - 2011, executive producer
- The Ballad of Hugh - 2012
- Dead Before Dawn - 2012, executive producer
- Random Acts of Romance - 2012, executive producer
- 30 Ghosts - 2013, executive producer
- Empire of Dirt - 2013, executive producer
- Sunday Punch - 2013, executive producer
- Purgatorium - 2013, executive producer
- Relative Happiness - 2014, executive producer
- The Cocksure Lads Movie - 2014, executive producer
- Porch Stories - 2014, executive producer
- Activism 2.0: A Rising Tide - 2014, executive producer
- Milk - 2015, executive producer
- How to Plan an Orgy in a Small Town - 2015, executive producer
- Owl River Runners - 2015, executive producer
- Basic Human Needs - 2015, executive producer
- Prisoner X - 2015, executive producer
- Bruno & Boots - 2016, line producer
- Divorce Photographer - 2016, executive producer
- A Sunday Kind of Love - 2016, executive producer
- Gods Acre - 2016, executive producer
- Minutes Past Midnight - 2016, executive producer
- The Land of Rock and Gold - 2016, executive producer
- The Adventure Club - 2016, executive producer
- Kiss and Cry - 2017
- Galaxy of Horrors - 2017
- Magic Pills - 2017, executive producer
- On Putin's Blacklist - 2017, executive producer
- Lifechanger - 2018
- Man Running - 2018
- Fugue - 2018, executive producer
- Circle of Steel - 2018, executive producer
- Holly Hobbie - 2018-22, executive producer and director
- Elijah and the Rock Creature - 2018, executive producer
- Blood, Sweat and Terrors - 2018
- Altered Skin - 2018
- Best Mates - 2018, executive producer
- States - 2019, executive producer
- Things I Do for Money - 2019
- Clapboard Jungle: Surviving the Independent Film Business - 2019, executive producer
- I Do, or I Die - 2020
- Avenged - 2020
- For the Sake of Vicious - 2020
- Red Balloon - 2020, also director
- Québexit - 2020, executive producer
- Writing Kim - 2020, consulting producer
- Motherly - 2021
- Woman in Car - 2021, executive producer
- Lethal Love - 2021, also director
- The Cancer Conflict - 2021, executive producer
- The Price of Fitting In - 2021
- The Elusive Purpurea Vulvavis - 2021, executive producer
- Free Range Children - 2021, executive producer
- PB+J: Plant Based with Jeremy - 2022
- A Desperate Road - 2022, executive producer
- Secrets in the Family - 2022
- Less Than Kosher - 2023, executive producer
- Fidelity - 2023, executive producer
- How We Ended Us - 2023, executive producer
- County Blooms - 2023, also director
- Summer at Charlotte's - 2023, also director
- Home Free - 2024, also director
- Frankie Freako - 2024, executive producer
- Deathstalker - 2025

== Awards ==
Award	Year	Category	Work	Result	Ref(s)
Gemini Awards	2011	Best Comedy Series	Good Dog with Scott Garvie, Christina Jennings, Laura Harbin, Ken Finkleman, Jan Peter Meyboom	Nominated	
Canadian Screen Awards	2013	Best Motion Picture	Still Mine with Jody Colero, Tamara Deverell	Nominated	
Canadian Screen Awards	2023	Best Children's or Youth Fiction Program or Series	Holly Hobbie with Anthony Leo, Andrew Rosen, Stefan Brogren, Daniel Barnes, Sean Gorman, Ian Lambur, Ryan Wiesbrock, Matthew Wexler, Sarah Glinski	Nominated	
