= Rouen Castle =

Castle in Rouen, France

Coordinates: 49°26′47″N 1°5′40″E

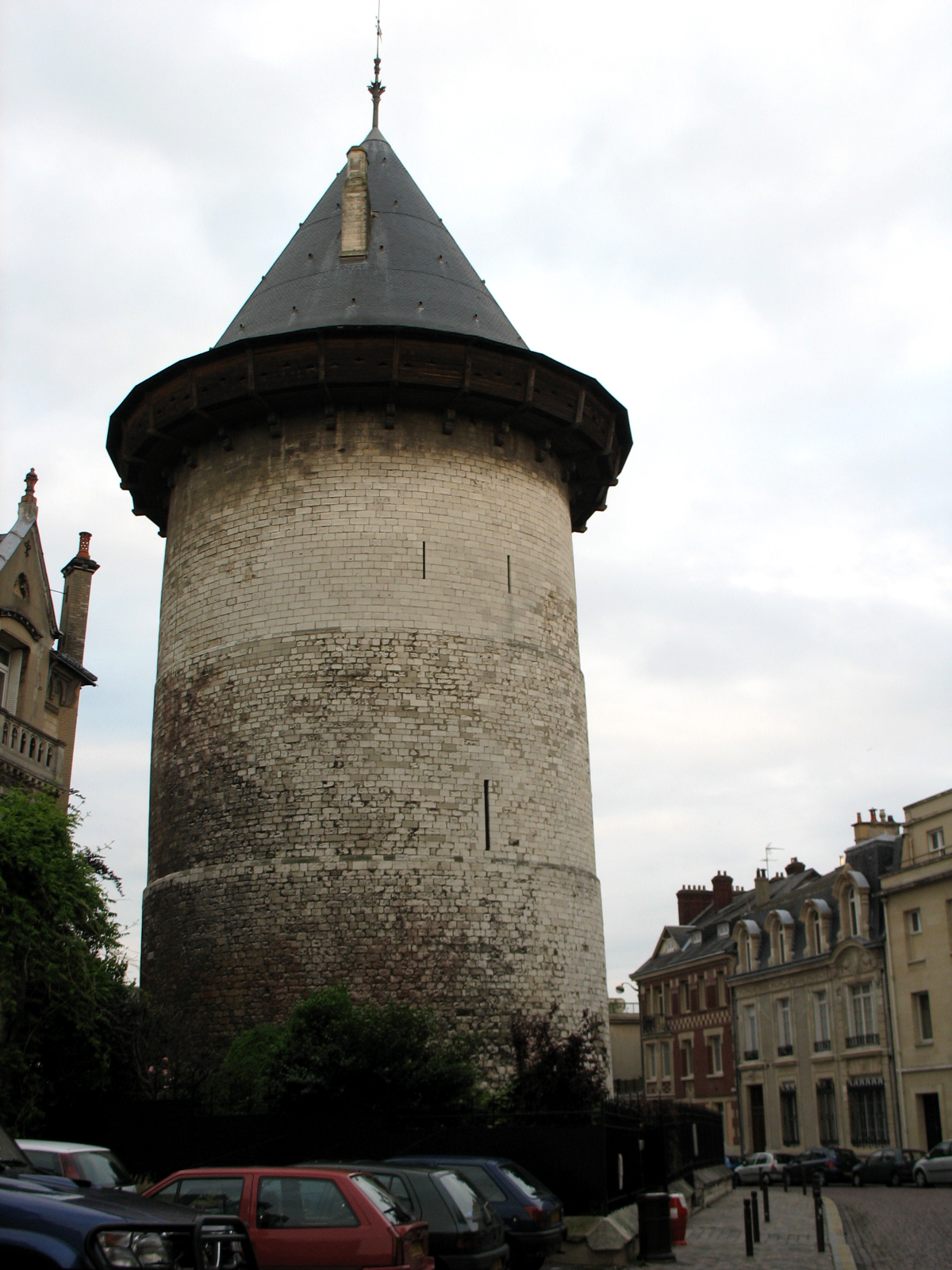
The keep of Rouen Castle, now known as the Tour Jeanne d'Arc

Rouen Castle (Château Bouvreuil) was a fortified ducal and royal residence in the city of Rouen, capital of the duchy of Normandy, now in France. With the exception of the tower wrongly associated with Joan of Arc, which was restored by Viollet-le-Duc in the 19th century, the castle was destroyed at the end of the 16th century, its stones quarried for other construction.

== History ==
The castle was built by Philip II of France from 1204 to 1210 following his capture of the duchy from John, Duke of Normandy and King of England. Located outside the medieval town to its north, in a dominant position on Bouvreuil hill, it played a military role in the Hundred Years' War and the Wars of Religion. The castle formed a large defensive triangle flanked at its corners by high round towers, the royal keep (now known as the Joan of Arc tower) at its northern point. The castle was erected upon the earlier site of a Gallo-Roman amphitheatre.

It was here that Joan of Arc was imprisoned on 23 December 1430.

=== Surprise assault in 1432 ===
Following the trial and execution of Joan of Arc in May 1431 and the subsequent coronation of Henry VI in Paris in December 1431, Rouen Castle remained the main military headquarters and administrative seat for the English crown in Normandy. French military forces under Charles VII sought opportunities to strike at key English holdings to weaken their hold on northern France.

In February 1432 (recorded as 1431 under the Easter-style calendar then in use), Guillaume de Ricarville, a French captain from the Caux region, assembled a force of approximately 120 chosen combatants. The raiders gained entry to the fortress at night through the collusion of a guard within the English garrison, identified in contemporary accounts as a Béarnais soldier.

Catching the garrison by surprise, Ricarville's force infiltrated the complex and secured the castle's central keep, known as the Grosse Tour (today known as the Joan of Arc Tower). The English commander, John Fitzalan, Earl of Arundel, was caught completely unprepared and narrowly escaped into the town in his nightshirt. Ricarville's men locked the gates of the keep against the garrison and held control of the main tower.

The overall plan required a larger reinforcement detachment of around 500 French soldiers, led by other Armagnac captains, to advance into the city and secure Rouen. However, the outer force hesitated outside the city gates. According to the chronicler Enguerrand de Monstrelet, the reinforcement commanders squandered critical time arguing over how prospective city spoils, ransom, and plunder would be divided among them.

This delay allowed the Earl of Arundel and the English garrison sufficient time to reorganize, rally support from the city's inhabitants, and mount a counter-attack. The English forces surrounded the central keep, cutting off the raiders inside. Trapped without food, supplies, or hope of external relief, Ricarville's men held out for twelve days before being forced to surrender unconditionally.

Following their surrender, the captured French raiders were taken to the marketplace in Rouen, where they were executed by decapitation and quartering on the orders of the English authorities.

=== Calendar Dating ===
In medieval French administrative and chronicler records, including the Chronique of Enguerrand de Monstrelet, this event is recorded under the year 1431. This is because the French calendar of the period calculated the beginning of the new year at Easter (Old Style) rather than 1 January (New Style). Under modern Gregorian historical conversion, the event occurred in February 1432.

=== Decline and Demolition ===
In 1485, Charles VIII was the last king of France to reside at the castle. After the castle was no longer used as a residence, the fortress fell into a state of lapsed maintenance. On 24 July 1542, a fire caused an explosion of gunpowder that ravaged the towers at the castle's entrance.

The fortress's vulnerability to artillery led to orders given to demolish the castle in 1590. The dismantling of the castle began in 1591, starting with parts of the towers and ramparts.

== Tour Jeanne d'Arc ==
Formerly known as the castle's donjon or "Grosse Tour", this tower is part of Philip's 1204 phase. It housed one of the sessions of Joan of Arc's trial on 9 May 1431, one in which she was shown the instruments of torture, to which she replied "Truly, if you have to pull my members and my soul from my body, I shall say nothing else; and if I say something to you, I would always say to you afterwards that you made me say it by force."

The tower was classified as a Historic Monument in 1840 and was subject to ongoing restoration spanning from 1868 to 1884, during which the tower was rebuilt and a pointed roof was added. During the Second World War the tower was camouflaged and turned into a bunker by the occupying German forces. It is now open to the public.
