= The Home for Blind Women =

- Directed by: Sandra Kybartas
- Written by: Barbara Nichol
- Produced by: Ronald Gilbert; Christina Jennings; Sandra Kybartas
- Starring: Helen Carscallen; Susan Kottmann
- Cinematography: Jonathan Freeman
- Edited by: Miume Jan
- Music by: David Krystal
- Production company: Canadian Film Centre
- Release date: September 23, 1995
- Running time: 14 minutes
- Country: Canada
- Language: English

The Home for Blind Women is a Canadian dramatic short film, directed by Sandra Kybartas and released in 1995. Based on a true story, the film is a mockumentary which stars Helen Carscallen and Susan Kottmann as two elderly women living in a group home for blind women, but exploring the building's more lurid history as a bordello.

The film's screenplay was written by Barbara Nichol.

The film premiered at the Cinéfest Sudbury International Film Festival in September 1995.

The film won the Genie Award for Best Theatrical Short Film at the 17th Genie Awards. At the San Francisco International Film Festival in 1996, the film won the Gold Spire Award for Best Film Under 15 Minutes.
