= Marie-Andrée Corneille =

Canadian actress

Marie-Andrée Corneille is a Canadian actress from Quebec. She is most noted for her role in the 1996 film Mistaken Identity (Erreur sur la personne), for which she was a Genie Award nominee for Best Supporting Actress at the 17th Genie Awards.

She also appeared in the films La fête des rois and The Left-Hand Side of the Fridge (La moitié gauche du frigo), and the television series Watatatow, Malo Korrigan and the Space Tracers and Les Soeurs Elliot. She has not had an onscreen role since 2007, but continues to do voice work as a documentary film narrator and in French-language dubbing of Hollywood films.
