= Reese Eveneshen =

Canadian film director and screenwriter

Reese Eveneshen is a Canadian film director and screenwriter based in Guelph, Ontario, most noted as co-director with Gabriel Carrer of the 2020 film For the Sake of Vicious.

He was born and spent part of his childhood in Edmonton, Alberta, before moving to Guelph as a teenager. He attracted his first major attention when, in 2006, he embarked on a project to film an independent remake of the classic horror film Night of the Living Dead on a budget of just $100.

He followed up in 2010 with the original zombie film Dead Genesis. He then made a number of short films, winning a screenplay accelerator award at the Canadian Film Festival in 2013, before releasing his third feature film, the science fiction thriller Defective, in 2017.

In 2022, following For the Love of Vicious, he joined Federgreen Entertainment as head of development.

== Filmography ==
- Night of the Living Dead' - 2007
- Numb - 2008
- Dead Genesis - 2010
- Bail Enforcers - 2011 (writer only)
- First Assignment - 2012
- The Zombie Disposal Unit Presents Zombie Truck - 2012
- Gumshoes - 2014
- Defective - 2017
- For the Sake of Vicious - 2020, with Gabriel Carrer
- Home Free - 2024 (writer only)
