= Caux =

Caux may refer to:

== Places ==
- Caux, Hérault, southern France
- Caux, Switzerland
- Pays de Caux, Normandy
- Caux or Kaw, French Guiana
- Caus Castle, near Westbury, Shropshire

== People ==
- Caux (surname)
