= Gary Burns (director) =

Canadian film writer and director

- Born: 1960 (age 65–66); Calgary, Alberta
- Occupations: Film director Screenwriter
- Years active: 1995 - Present

Gary Burns (born 1960) is a Canadian film writer and director. Burns studied drama at the University of Calgary before attending Concordia University, where he graduated in 1992 from the Fine Arts film program.

Born in Calgary, Alberta, many of Burns' films are shot in Calgary, and contain references to the particularities of living in the city. The Plus 15 system becomes the habitrail of urban semi-professionals in waydowntown and the public transportation system becomes a node where lives intersect in The Suburbanators. Radiant City examines the seemingly endless amount of suburban neighbourhoods that has overtaken Calgary.

Burns is an alumnus of the University of Calgary's television program.

== Film festival acceptance ==
His works have been very well received at Canadian film festivals. His first feature film, The Suburbanators, debuted at the 1995 Toronto International Film Festival, where it placed in the top ten Canadian films and was also invited to the Sundance film festival in 1996. It is a comedy/road movie about bored suburban slackers in Calgary.

At the 1997 Vancouver International Film Festival, he was awarded Best Emerging Director for Kitchen Party, a "teenage house party gone wrong" comedy. His film waydowntown was given the Best Canadian Feature prize at the 2000 Toronto International Film Festival. His 2006 film, Radiant City, co-directed with Jim Brown, garnered the Special Jury Prize at the Vancouver International Film Festival.

== Filmography ==
- The Suburbanators - 1995
- Kitchen Party - 1997
- Fuck Coke - 1999
- waydowntown - 2000
- A Problem with Fear - 2003
- Radiant City - 2006
- The Future Is Now! - 2010
- Man Running - 2018
