= Henry Orenstein (painter) =

Canadian artist (1918–2008)

Henry Orenstein (January 13, 1918 – August 8, 2008) was a Canadian artist, animator, activist, teacher, soldier and pacifist. He was best known for his contributions to the art world and for his art work - he specialized in easel paintings and murals. His work is displayed in private and public collections across Canada, most notably in the Art Gallery of Nova Scotia and the Art Gallery of Sudbury.

== Early life and family ==
Orenstein was born into a Jewish family in Midland, Ontario, but later raised in Toronto. This is where he developed his lifelong interest in politics and human rights. In his youth, Orenstein fought as a foot soldier in the Second World War, an experience that led him to be a lifelong pacifist. It was during the war that he met and married his wife Joan Orenstein, a noted Canadian actress; he had five daughters: Jill, Edie, Ruth, Cia, and Sarah. His youngest child, Sarah, is a Dora Award recipient for her portrayal of a sharp-tongued feminist filmmaker in Brad Fraser’s dark comedy, Cold Meat Party (2003).

== Education and career ==
After the war, Orenstein studied painting at the Art Students League of New York with Mary Stepnberg before returning to Toronto to start his family with Joan. He became a member of the Canadian Society of Graphic Art in 1949. In the 1950s, Orenstein and his family moved to Halifax, Nova Scotia, where he began his 25-year career with the CBC as a graphic designer and set designer. Also in Halifax, he taught drawing and animation at the Nova Scotia College of Art and Design and was an active member of Halifax's art community. One of Orenstein's well known art contributions was a mural he created for Local 598 of the Mill Mine Union in the 1955. Orenstein was a member of the International and Feather Workers (IFL) and had spent time working in the needle trades and fur industry. With the establishment of the Canadian Labour Congress and the growth of unions during the 1950s, Orenstein was one of the first artists to be commissioned by a union to paint a mural. He spent three and a half months in Sudbury, Ontario sketching, getting to know the community, and the workers in order to depict Sudbury's local industrial landscape. The mural was 36 feet long and 41 inches high and intended to illustrate the common tensions such as jobs and the polluted landscape of Sudbury during the 1950s.

Photographs related to the Sudbury mural and the papers of Henry Orenstein can be found in the Joan and Henry Orenstein fonds, Dalhousie University Library.
