= Murder in Passing =

Canadian short film series directed by John Greyson

Murder in Passing is a Canadian short film web series directed by John Greyson, which was broadcast as a series of 42 30-second episodes through January and February 2013 on Pattison Outdoor Advertising's video screens in the Toronto Transit Commission's subway system.

The series stars Alexander Chapman as Epicene, a transgender detective investigating the murder of Mars Brito (Chase Joynt), a bike courier, in the fictional town of Passing, British Columbia. The cast also includes Guillermo Verdecchia, Arsinée Khanjian, Moynan King and Nina Arsenault.

The series was commissioned in 2007 as an outgrowth of the Toronto Urban Film Festival, an annual event in which Pattison screens one-minute short works by artists and filmmakers on its network of subway video screens. The episodes were also distributed as a web series, additional clues to the mystery were published via Twitter and in the Toronto edition of Metro, and Greyson indicated plans to expand it into a feature film. In the web series edition, each episode is followed by a 30-second opera aria, written by David Wall, which also shares clues to the murder.
