= Manon Miclette =

Canadian actress

Manon Miclette is a Canadian actress from Quebec. She is most noted for her performance in the 1996 film Love Me, Love Me Not (J'aime, j'aime pas), for which she received a Genie Award nomination for Best Supporting Actress at the 17th Genie Awards.

She also appeared in the films The Sphinx (Le Sphinx), It's Your Turn, Laura Cadieux (C't'à ton tour, Laura Cadieux), Bittersweet Memories (Ma vie en cinémascope) and The Legacy (La Donation), and the television series Avec un grand A, Jasmine, Omertà II: La loi du silence and Catherine.

She is a 1993 graduate of the National Theatre School of Canada.
