= Love Me, Love Me Not (film) =

- French: J'aime, j'aime pas
- Directed by: Sylvie Groulx
- Written by: Sylvie Groulx; Jacques Marcotte
- Produced by: Monique Létourneau
- Starring: Lucie Laurier; Patrick Labbé; Caroline Néron; Manon Miclette; Sylvie Léonard
- Cinematography: Jacques Leduc
- Edited by: Fernand Bélanger; Michelle Guérin
- Music by: André Duchesne; René Lussier
- Production company: National Film Board of Canada
- Release date: March 1, 1996
- Running time: 89 minutes
- Country: Canada
- Language: French

Love Me, Love Me Not (French: J'aime, j'aime pas) is a Canadian drama film, directed by Sylvie Groulx and released in 1996. Groulx's only narrative feature film within a career otherwise making documentary films, the film stars Lucie Laurier as Winnifred, a teenage single mother raising her baby on her own after being abandoned by her boyfriend and disowned by her mother during the pregnancy.

== Cast ==
- Lucie Laurier
- Dominic Darceuil
- Patrick Labbé
- Caroline Néron
- Manon Miclette
- Sylvie Léonard

== Production ==
The most gruesome scene for Lucie Laurier remains the one where Winnie poses naked in front of a class of young artists. She said, "Filming is one thing and seeing yourself on the screen is another. Even if it's not easy to shoot naked in front of 30 people, and I was shaking like a leaf, it didn't bother me too much, because there was great respect on the set. But on screen, this scene, frankly, I didn't find it beautiful at all! I console myself by telling myself that I was not playing a pin-up ..."

== Awards ==
Miclette received a Genie Award nomination for Best Supporting Actress at the 17th Genie Awards.
