= Kitchen Party (film) =

- Theatrical poster
- Directed by: Gary Burns
- Written by: Gary Burns
- Produced by: Christine Haebler; John Hazlett
- Starring: Scott Speedman; Laura Harris; Gillian Barber
- Cinematography: Robert Aschmann
- Edited by: Reginald Harkema
- Music by: Schaun Tozer
- Release date: September 8, 1997
- Running time: 92 minutes
- Language: English

Kitchen Party is a 1997 film written and directed by Gary Burns (The Suburbanators). The movie cast a number of then-unknown young Canadian actors, including Scott Speedman, Laura Harris, and Tygh Runyan, and was released on September 8, 1997, at the Toronto International Film Festival.

== Plot ==
In the bored suburban atmosphere of a Canadian city, Scott (Scott Speedman) decides to throw a celebratory get-together with friends in his parents' home. Unfortunately, there's a catch: Scott's parents happen to be particularly anal about the direction the carpet fibers lay and the distance from doily to table-edge. This means that the only part of the house that is safe, that is, the only part of the house with no carpeting and therefore no potential mess, is the tiled kitchen.

The festivities begin once the parents go off to a party of their own, leaving Scott and his buddy, Wayne (Tygh Runyan), with a house that would be entirely empty but for Scott's mysterious brother lurking in the basement listening to rock music. Scott's parents at the adult party, which descends into drunken bickering.

At the teen party, soon the girls are arriving, including Scott's girlfriend, Tammy (Laura Harris) — whom he plans on bedding before the night is over — and alcohol, drugs, music, more people, and everything else that characterizes a stereotypical house party follows. This includes calamity, as Scott quickly discovers just how much can go wrong in one night of kitchen partying.

== Cast ==
- Scott Speedman as Scott
- Laura Harris as Tammy
- Tygh Runyan as Wayne
- John Payne as Bill
- A.J. Bond as Tim
- James McBurney as Cal
- Jenafor Ryane as Marni (credited as Janafor Ryane)
- Joelle Thomas as Marie
- Kevin McNulty as Brent
- Gillian Barber as Barb
- Marie Stillin as Marge
- Sarah Strange as Cynthia
- Dave Cox as Lester Jr.
- Jason Wiles as Steve
- Jay Brazeau as Fred

== Awards and nominations ==
- Rotterdam International Film Festival (1998): Gary Burns nominated for Tiger Award.
- Torino International Festival of Young Cinema (1997): Gary Burns won FIPRESCI Prize - Special Mention for the film's "incisive and ironic portrayal of middle class family life in Western society."
- Torino International Festival of Young Cinema (1997): Gary Burns won a Special Mention.
- Torino International Festival of Young Cinema (1997): Kitchen Party nominated in Best Film category for the Prize of the City of Torino.
- Vancouver International Film Festival (1997): Gary Burns won for Best New Western Canadian Director.
