= Man Running (film) =

2018 Canadian film

- Directed by: Gary Burns
- Written by: Gary Burns; Donna Brunsdale
- Produced by: Gary Burns; Avi Federgreen; Donna Brunsdale
- Starring: Gord Rand; Ivana Shein; Milli Wilkinson
- Cinematography: Patrick McLaughlin
- Edited by: Gary Burns; Donna Brunsdale
- Music by: Scott Munro; Matt Flegel
- Production company: IndieCan Entertainment
- Release date: September 17, 2018 (Cinéfest)
- Running time: 90 minutes
- Country: Canada
- Language: English

Man Running is a Canadian drama film, directed by Gary Burns and released in 2018. The film stars Gord Rand as Jim, a pediatric oncologist doctor running a mountain marathon while wrestling with the ethical complications of assisted suicide after an ill teenage girl (Milli Wilkinson) asks for his help ending her life. Pediatric oncologists are expected to have a close, personal relationship with their patients. While running the marathon, the viewer is asked to decide what was the final decision of Jim while he hallucinates (normal in marathons of this length) alternative outcomes during the marathon.

Production on the film commenced in 2017, with the film being shot in Calgary, Canmore and Kananaskis, Alberta.

The film premiered in September 2018 at the Cinéfest Sudbury International Film Festival, and had its second screening at the Calgary International Film Festival a week later. The film received several Rosie Award nominations from the Alberta Media Production Industries Association in 2019, including for Best Picture.

The film had its television premiere on August 17, 2019, on CBC Television.
