= Gord Rand =

Canadian actor and playwright

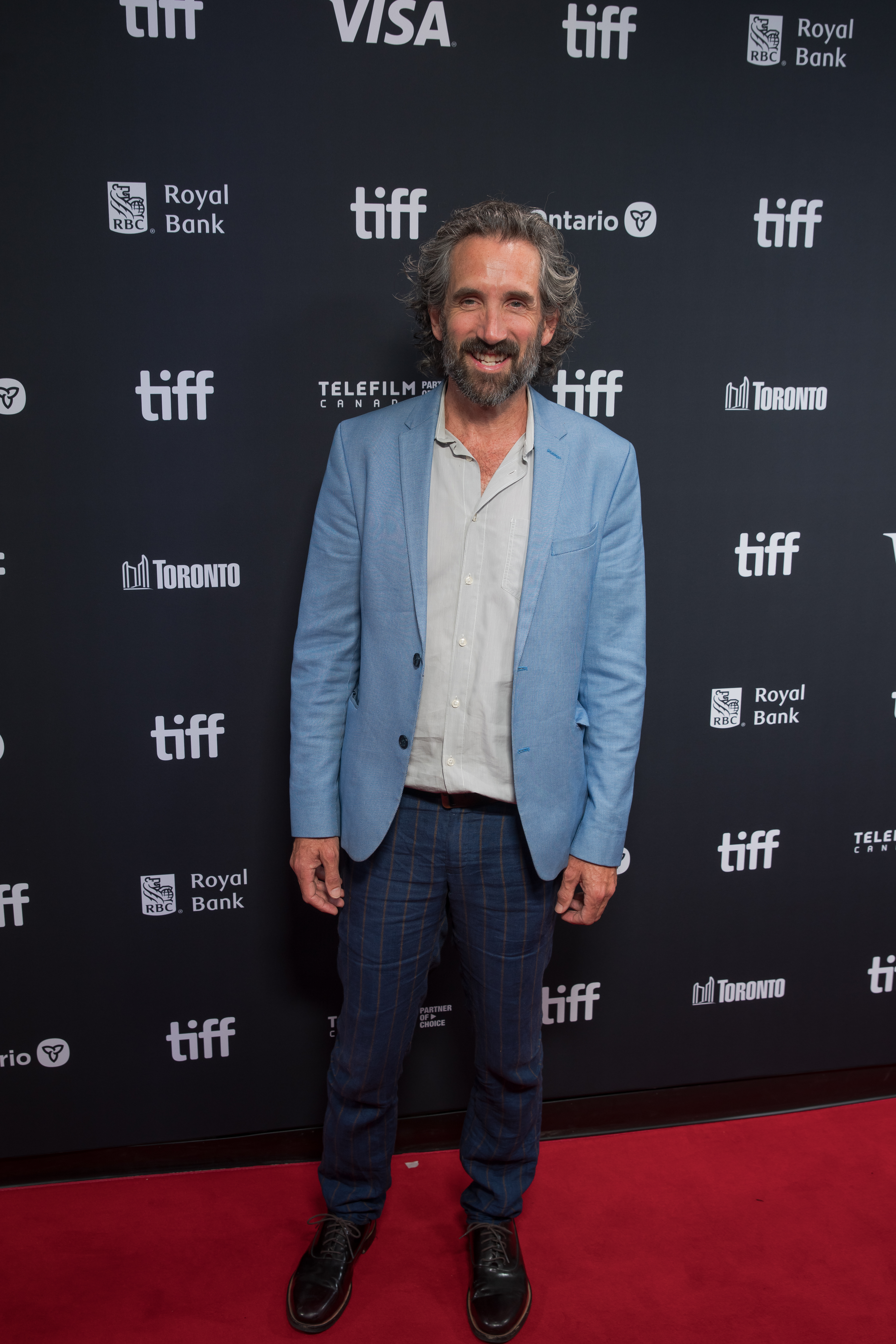
- Education: University of Toronto
- Occupations: Actor; playwright
- Spouse: Jeanie Calleja
- Children: 2

Gord Rand is a Canadian actor and playwright. He is most noted for his recurring role as Det. Marty Duko in the television series Orphan Black, for which he was a Canadian Screen Award nominee for Best Performance in a Guest Role in a Dramatic Series at the 5th Canadian Screen Awards in 2017.

He has also been a two-time ACTRA Award nominee, receiving nods in 2017 for Orphan Black and in 2019 for the film Man Running, and was a Dora Mavor Moore Award winner in 2006 for his performance in the Royal Alexandra Theatre's production of Michael Healey's The Innocent Eye Test.

Rand is married to actress Jeanie Calleja. The couple have two children.

His other credits have included the television series Everest '82, Durham County, Combat Hospital, Cardinal, Pure and Chapelwaite, the films Maps to the Stars, The Definites, Mayerthorpe, An Audience of Chairs, Home Free and Peak Everything (Amour Apocalypse), and on stage in productions of William Shakespeare's Hamlet for Necessary Angel Theatre, Maria Milisavljevic's Abyss for Tarragon Theatre, Oedipus Rex for the Stratford Festival, and Christopher Morris's The Runner for Theatre Passe Muraille. In 2021, he was announced as joining the cast of the television series Transplant in its second season.

As a writer, his plays have included Orgy in the Lighthouse and The Trouble with Mr. Adams.

He is a graduate of the theatre program at the University of Toronto.
