= Nina Arsenault =

Canadian actress

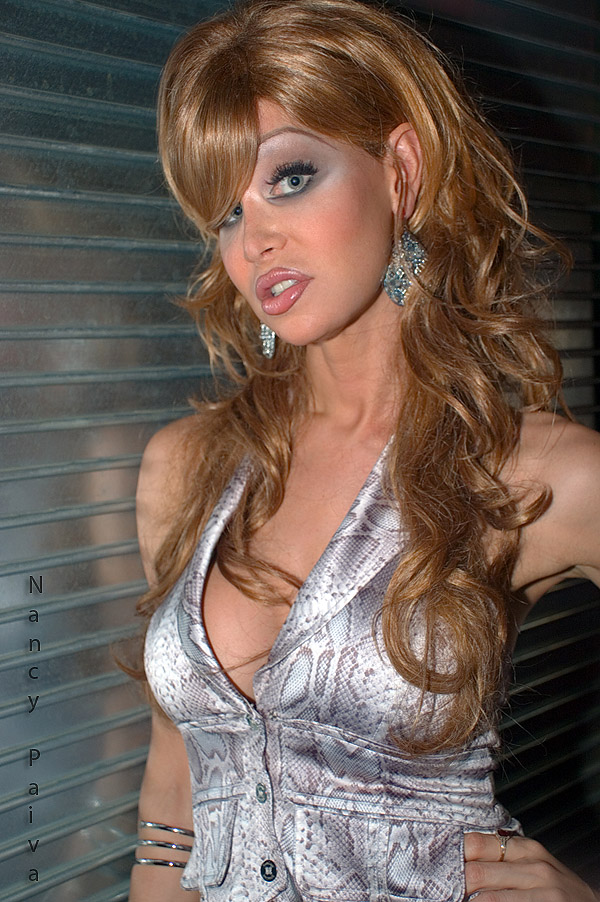
- Arsenault in 2007
- Born: January 20, 1974 (age 52); Beamsville, Ontario, Canada
- Occupations: performer, actress, sex worker

Nina Arsenault (born January 20, 1974) is a Canadian performance artist, freelance writer, and former sex worker who works in theatre, dance, video, photography, and visual art.

== Personal life ==
Arsenault grew up in a trailer park in Beamsville, Ontario. She has two master's degrees. At one point prior to her transition, Arsenault was an instructor at York University, where she taught acting.

She has said she realized that she was a trans woman in August 1996 and was fully mid-transition around 1998. By 2007, she had undergone over $150,000 in surgery during her transition, financed through work in the sex industry as a webcam model, a stripper, and a self-described "hooker (oral sex only)."

Prior to his murder conviction, Arsenault dated aspiring model Luka Magnotta around 2002, who she described as manipulative and self-destructive.

== Career ==
Arsenault wrote a regular column on transgender issues for 36 issues of fab, a biweekly Toronto-based LGBT magazine. Her last column was in early 2007.

She appeared on the television series Train 48 and KinK, as well as the Showtime movie Soldier's Girl.

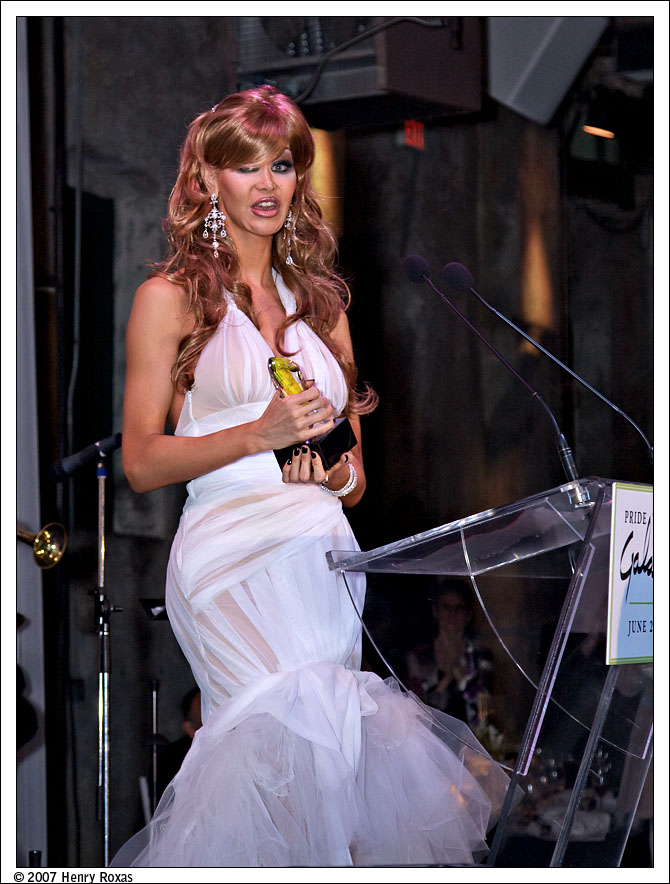
Arsenault in June, 2007

She had a well-publicized encounter with Tommy Lee, wherein he flirted with Arsenault for some time before discovering that Arsenault was transgender and subsequently left in a hurry.

Arsenault appeared in a one-act play written for her by Sky Gilbert in November 2007 entitled Ladylike. She also wrote her own one-woman show called The Silicone Diaries, directed by Buddies in Bad Times artistic director Brendan Healy, which toured across Canada to sold-out houses and critical praise.

She also appeared on The Jon Dore Television Show, appearing in the episode "Manly Man". She stated the reason why she does not want bottom surgery:

I work as a dancer in a club that caters to men who like "transsexuals." They want us to have beautiful breasts, you know, to be sexy like females but they want that one thing to be different.

In 2010, she performed an autobiographical play entitled i was Barbie.

In 2012, she performed 40 Days and 40 Nights as part of the inaugural SummerWorks Live Art series in Toronto. For this performance, she spent 40 days undergoing a spiritual experience and opened the last 11 days to the public. As part of this performance, she spent two hours a night whipping herself while riding an exercise bike. She has also performed For Every Time You Shattered Me I Made Myself Again, a six-hour performance in the Henry Moore Sculpture Room at the Art Gallery of Ontario where she appeared in several different personas live and onscreen, dressing, undressing, and washing herself with a number of unspecified fluids in front of the audience.

In 2013, at London's ]performance s p a c e [ she lived inside an art gallery for six days for a work called Lillex. Here, with UK artist Poppy Jackson, Arsenault performed rituals which explored feminine mythology as well as virtuality, including a trance-like dance which would often continue for six hours at a time. During these dances she was repeatedly burned with cigarettes on her chest, neck, breasts, and occasionally above the genitals, appearing unaffected by pain.

Her photographic and video collaborations with artists like Bruce LaBruce, John Greyson, Jordan Tannahill, and Istvan Kantor have been shown across Canada and around the world via film and video festivals, academic and art journals, and galleries including the Museum of Contemporary Canadian Art, Pleasuredome, FADO Performance Art Centre, and New York University.

Arsenault has been a frequent guest speaker at universities in Canada and the United States as well as conferences like Moses Znaimer's Ideacity. She has also worked as a social activist promoting the rights and dignity of trans people with the Toronto Police Service, Mount Sinai Hospital, Women's College Hospital, the Sherbourne Health Centre, Supporting Our Youth, and The 519.

In 2013, Arsenault joined MAU, a New Zealand company of contemporary performance led by Lemi Ponifasio. Her first work with MAU was called The Crimson House and was scheduled for a world tour in 2014 and beyond. In the same year, she had a supporting role in John Greyson's web series Murder in Passing.

Arsenault's life and work are the subject of the book Trans(per)forming Nina Arsenault - An Unreasonable Body of Work, edited by Judith Rudakoff, published in April 2012.
