= Jim Brown (radio host) =

Canadian radio personality

Jim Brown is a Canadian radio personality, best known as a host of programming on CBC Radio One.

He was the host of the Calgary Eyeopener on CBR in Calgary from 2003 until 2011, and the national public affairs program The 180 on CBC Radio One from 2013 to 2017.

Before moving to Calgary, he hosted The Morning Show at CBN in St. John's, Newfoundland, for eight seasons.

He has also been heard across Canada as a guest host of The Current, Sounds Like Canada, As It Happens, The House and Q.

Prior to joining the CBC, Brown worked as a newspaper reporter and magazine editor. His first film, the feature film Radiant City, co-directed with Gary Burns, was presented in September 2006 at the Toronto International Film Festival. The film won a Genie Award for Best Documentary in 2007.

== Filmography ==
- Radiant City (2006)
