= Lilies (film) =

- French: Les Feluettes
- Directed by: John Greyson
- Written by: Michel Marc Bouchard; Linda Gaboriau
- Based on: Lilies by Michel Marc Bouchard
- Produced by: Robin Cass; Arnie Gelbart; Anna Stratton
- Starring: Jason Cadieux; Matthew Ferguson; Danny Gilmore; Brent Carver; Rémy Girard
- Cinematography: Daniel Jobin
- Edited by: André Corriveau
- Music by: Mychael Danna
- Production companies: Triptych Media; Galafilm Productions
- Distributed by: Alliance Releasing
- Release date: 7 September 1996 (premiere at TIFF)
- Running time: 95 minutes
- Country: Canada
- Languages: English; French
- Budget: $2,200,000 CAD
- Box office: $301,548

Lilies (French title: Les Feluettes) is a 1996 Canadian film directed by John Greyson. It is an adaptation by Michel Marc Bouchard and Linda Gaboriau of Bouchard's own play Lilies. It depicts a play being performed in a prison by the inmates.

The film screened at numerous festivals, including Sundance, and received critical acclaim; it was nominated for 14 awards Genie Awards at the 17th ceremony, winning 4, including Best Picture.

== Plot summary ==
=== Expository narration ===
Lilies is set in a Quebec prison in 1952. Jean Bilodeau (Marcel Sabourin), the local bishop, is brought to the prison to hear the confession of Simon Doucet (Aubert Pallascio), a dying inmate. But Doucet in fact has a very different revelation for Bilodeau: he has enlisted his fellow inmates to stage a play set in 1912, when Bilodeau and Doucet were childhood friends.

=== The play within the film ===
Most of the film consists of the play within the film, presented by the inmates for Bilodeau and Doucet. Because it is taking place within a prison, the female roles are portrayed by the male prisoners. The young Bilodeau and Simon are performed by younger inmates (Matthew Ferguson and Jason Cadieux).

The play dramatizes a period during Bilodeau and Simon's childhood in Roberval, Quebec, when they were both coming to terms with their homosexuality. Simon has a romantic relationship with Vallier (Danny Gilmore), while Bilodeau remains repressed and tries desperately to convince Simon to join the seminary with him. All three are involved in a school play dramatizing the martyrdom of Saint Sebastian, with Simon in the lead role. The St. Sebastian play's homoerotic undertones contribute to Bilodeau's sexual awakening, which involves an unrequited love for Simon. Bilodeau recognizes the nature of the relationship between Simon and Vallier, and confronts them one afternoon after the rehearsal of the St. Sebastian play. Simon and Vallier attack and subdue Bilodeau, so that Simon can engage him in a derisively passionate kiss. In the middle of the kiss, Vallier's mother, the Countess de Tilly (Brent Carver) enters the arena, forcing Simon to break off the kiss and flee. Vallier's mother (who is slightly insane) is unperturbed at what she has seen, and has Vallier escort her to the arrival by hot air balloon of a Parisian aristocrat.

Simon's father is also at the arrival, where Vallier's mother unwittingly reveals to him that she saw his son passionately kissing Bilodeau. In a rage, Mr. Doucet finds Simon and brutally beats him, to the point where he must find medical attention for his wounds. He chooses to see a Parisian doctor staying at the hotel in town (to avoid the town doctor telling his business), and he meets Lydie-Anne (Alexander Chapman), a young Parisian baroness. Because of the beating, Simon renounces his love for Vallier and appears to fall in love with Lydie-Ann, eventually becoming engaged to her. However, Vallier's mother encourages Vallier to attend the engagement party and declare his love for Simon. At the party, it becomes apparent that Simon never stopped loving Vallier and was only using Lydie-Ann to pass as heterosexual. Because her feelings are hurt, Lydie-Ann reveals to Vallier's mother that her estranged husband is living happily in Paris with a new wife and child. She also tells her that she came to Roberval on the recommendation of Vallier's father, and while he mentioned structures and the landscape of the town, he never once spoke of the wife or child he left behind there.

After the party, Simon and Vallier meet for one last romantic encounter. Afterwards, Vallier's mother says that she will be going to Paris, and invites Simon and Vallier to see her off. Instead, she leads them to a place in the woods, where she lies down in a shallow grave and has Vallier strangle her to death. Bilodeau witnesses the murder, and is spurred to confess his love for Simon. When rejected, he sets fire to the room where Vallier and Simon are staying and locks the door, trapping Vallier and Simon. Bilodeau is remorseful and returns in time to drag Simon to safety, but leaves Vallier behind. Bilodeau lies to arriving policemen, claiming that Vallier is already dead. Vallier perishes in the flames.

=== Conclusion ===
The play reveals that Vallier's murder is the crime for which Simon Doucet was falsely arrested and convicted. Thus, the play was designed not as Doucet's confession of his sins, but a ploy to extract a confession of guilt from Bilodeau. Bilodeau asks Doucet to kill him, but Doucet refuses.

== Cast ==
| Actor | Role |
|---|---|
| Brent Carver | Countess de Tilly |
| Marcel Sabourin | The Bishop |
| Aubert Pallascio | Simon Doucet (older) |
| Jason Cadieux | Young Simon |
| Matthew Ferguson | Young Bilodeau |
| Danny Gilmore | Vallier |
| Alexander Chapman | Lydie-Anne |
| Ian D. Clark | Father Saint Michel, Chaplain |
| Gary Farmer | Timothée |
| Robert Lalonde | The Baron |
| Rémy Girard | The Baroness |
| John Dunn-Hill | Warden |
| Paul-Patrice Charbonneau | Chauffeur, Simon's father, Mr. Doucet |
| Michel Marc Bouchard | Photographer |
| Khanh Hua; Benoît Lagrandeur; Pierre LeBlanc; Jean Lévesque; Antoine Jobin; Alain Gendreau; Simon Simpson; Eddy Rios; Martin Stone | Prison Ensemble |

== Style ==
In a 2017 interview with CBC Arts, Greyson described the film as a "strange Genet-inflected-via-Fellini fable".

The play-within-the-film is sometimes shot in realistic settings, while other scenes explicitly take place in the prison chapel. Realist scenes segue into prison scenes through visible set changes. After a realist autumn scene, leaves are shown being removed from the chapel floor. The final sex scene between Doucet and Vallier is presented in realist style, but fades into a prison scene when the boat in which the couple are having sex becomes a bathtub in the chapel.

Even in the realist scenes, however, female characters in the prison play are portrayed by the male actors portraying the prisoners.

The play's dialogue and acting are deliberately heightened according to stage, rather than film conventions.

== Awards ==
| Award | Date of ceremony | Category | Recipient(s) | Result | Ref(s) |
|---|---|---|---|---|---|
| Genie Awards | 1996 | Best Motion Picture | Robin Cass, Arnie Gelbart, Anna Stratton | Won | |
| Genie Awards | 1996 | Best Director | John Greyson | Nominated | |
| Genie Awards | 1996 | Best Actor | Jason Cadieux | Nominated | |
| Genie Awards | 1996 | Best Actor | Danny Gilmore | Nominated | |
| Genie Awards | 1996 | Best Actor | Matthew Ferguson | Nominated | |
| Genie Awards | 1996 | Best Supporting Actor | Alexander Chapman | Nominated | |
| Genie Awards | 1996 | Best Adapted Screenplay | Michel Marc Bouchard, Linda Gaboriau | Nominated | |
| Genie Awards | 1996 | Best Art Direction/Production Design | Sandra Kybartas | Won | |
| Genie Awards | 1996 | Best Cinematography | Daniel Jobin | Nominated | |
| Genie Awards | 1996 | Best Costume Design | Linda Muir | Won | |
| Genie Awards | 1996 | Best Editing | André Corriveau | Nominated | |
| Genie Awards | 1996 | Best Original Score | Mychael Danna | Nominated | |
| Genie Awards | 1996 | Best Overall Sound | Don Cohen, Keith Elliott, Scott Purdy, Scott Shepherd, Don White | Won | |
| Genie Awards | 1996 | Best Sound Editing | Janice Ierulli, Donna Powell, Tony Currie, Diane Boucher, Jane Tattersall, Richard Harkness | Nominated | |
| Locarno International Film Festival | 1996 | Golden Leopard | John Greyson | Nominated | |
| Montreal World Film Festival | 1996 | Best Canadian Film | John Greyson | Won | |
| Austin Gay and Lesbian International Film Festival | 1997 | Audience Favorite | John Greyson | Won | |
| L.A. Outfest | 1997 | Outstanding Narrative Feature | John Greyson | Won | |
| GLAAD Media Awards | 1998 | Outstanding Film, Limited Release | John Greyson | Nominated | |

== Streaming ==
In 2017 the film was released online on the Canada Media Fund Encore+ YouTube channel.
