= The Suburbanators =

The Suburbanators is a Canadian road movie/comedy film written and directed by Gary Burns and produced in 1995 by Burns and John Hazlett. It tells the story of bored, estranged slackers in their 20s who spend their time in suburban strip-malls, subdivisions and car lots in Calgary. The film was made for CDN$65,000. It was invited to play at the Sundance Film Festival and sold to the Sundance Channel. It is the first of what writer George Melnyk calls a trilogy which concludes with Kitchen Party (1998) and waydowntown (2000).

== Plot ==
Bob and Al are passing time by driving around and looking for marijuana. In another part of town, two other young men, Eric and Carl, are also trying to buy drugs. A group of three musicians are at a Middle Eastern restaurant. They go to the suburbs to find a relative after they accidentally get their instruments locked up in an apartment. Carl starts a fight with a novelist and Eric almost gets arrested for drugs in a police raid and then Eric starts a fight with the musicians. Carl and Bob steal some drugs.

== Cast ==
- Bob Stephen Spender as Bob
- Joel McNichol as Al
- Jacob Banigan as Eric
- Stewart Burdett as Carl

Musicians:

- Jihad Traya
- Ahmad Taha
- Rogy Masri

== Reception ==
Variety noted the "sharp editing and tight control of actors" and the use of "[b]leached colors, oblique camera angles and bargain-basement lighting". The film, which was aimed at male Generation X viewers, showed the unromantic drabness and pettiness of life in the suburbs in Western Canada, a stark contrast to the majestic mountains often shown in postcards.
