= Polygraph (film) =

1996 film by Robert Lepage

- French: Le Polygraphe
- Directed by: Robert Lepage
- Written by: Marie Brassard; Patrick Goyette; Robert Lepage; Michael Mackenzie
- Produced by: Philippe Carcassonne; Ulrich Felsberg; Madeleine Henrié; Bruno Jobin; Jean-Pierre St-Michel
- Starring: Marie Brassard; Patrick Goyette; Peter Stormare; Maria de Medeiros
- Cinematography: Guy Dufaux
- Edited by: Jean-François Bergeron; Emmanuelle Castro
- Music by: Robert Caux; Pierre Marchand
- Production companies: In Extremis Images; Cinéa
- Distributed by: Ciné 360
- Release date: 1996
- Running time: 92 minutes
- Country: Canada
- Language: French

Polygraph (French: Le Polygraphe) is a film by Canadian director Robert Lepage, released in 1996.

The film stars Marie Brassard as Lucie Champagne, an actress who is given the role of Marie-Claire in a film dramatizing a real-life murder, and Patrick Goyette as François, Lucie's former boyfriend who was Marie-Claire's neighbour, remains a suspect in the real crime to the point that even he is no longer fully convinced that he is innocent, and is being pressured to play the killer in the film. The film's cast also includes Josée Deschênes, Maria de Medeiros, Peter Stormare, Marie-Christine Lê-Huu and Richard Fréchette.

The film was inspired in part by the 1979 murder of France Lachapelle, an actress in Quebec City who had been a friend and colleague of Lepage's, with the result that Lepage discovered her body and was actually the police investigator's initial suspect before being cleared, and filmmaker Yves Simoneau's subsequent request that Lepage play the killer in Red Eyes (Les Yeux rouges), his 1982 film dramatizing the incident.

== Awards ==
Award	Date of ceremony	Category	Recipient(s)	Result	Ref.
Genie Awards	17th Genie Awards	Best Motion Picture	Philippe Carcassonne, Bruno Jobin, Jean-Pierre St-Michel, Ulrich Felsberg	Nominated	
Genie Awards	17th Genie Awards	Best Director	Robert Lepage	Nominated	
Genie Awards	17th Genie Awards	Best Actress	Marie Brassard	Nominated	
Genie Awards	17th Genie Awards	Best Supporting Actress	Josée Deschênes	Nominated	
Genie Awards	17th Genie Awards	Best Supporting Actress	Maria de Medeiros	Nominated	
Genie Awards	17th Genie Awards	Best Adapted Screenplay	Robert Lepage, Marie Brassard	Nominated	
Genie Awards	17th Genie Awards	Best Cinematography	Guy Dufaux	Nominated	
Genie Awards	17th Genie Awards	Overall Sound	Jo Caron, Claude Hazanavicius, Hans Peter Strobl, John Nestorowich	Nominated	
Genie Awards	17th Genie Awards	Sound Editing	Jean-Pierre Pinard, Jérôme Décarie, Serge Fortin, Raymond Vermette, Mario Rodrigue, Jacques Plante	Nominated	
