= Danny Gilmore =

Canadian actor (born 1973)

Danny Gilmore (born December 23, 1973) is a Canadian actor, who is best known for his role as Vallier in John Greyson's Lilies (1996), for which he received a Genie Award nomination for Best Actor at the 17th Genie Awards. He has also appeared in the films Gaz Bar Blues, Ice Cream, Chocolate and Other Consolations (Crème glacée, chocolat et autres consolations), Les Fils de Marie, Days of Darkness (L'Âge des ténèbres), Maria Chapdelaine and the French–Canadian TV movie Marie-Antoinette.

Gilmore wrote, produced and directed the independent film Bonzaïon in 2004. He was also named as one of ten directors to watch by the Canadian media journal Playback in 2005.

== Filmography ==
=== Film ===
Year	Title	Role	Notes
1996	Lilies (Les Feluettes)	Vallier	
1999	The Last Breath (Le Dernier souffle)	Policeman	
2000	Winter Lily	Clive	
2001	Ice Cream, Chocolate and Other Consolations (Crème glacée, chocolat et autres consolations)	Samuel	
2002	Summer	Shane Murphy	
2002	Marie's Sons (Les fils de Marie)	Alex	
2003	Saved by the Belles	Sean	
2003	Gaz Bar Blues	Guy Brochu	
2004	Bonzaïon	Claude	
2006	Family History (Histoire de famille)	Claudio	
2006	A Family Secret (Le Secret de ma mère)	Bertrand 22-40 ans	
2006	The Point	Harold	
2007	Days of Darkness (L'Âge des ténèbres)	Ecuyer du prince noir	
2008	Truffles (Truffe)	Commerçant #4	
2018	A Place to Live (Pour vivre ici)	Stéphane Langevin	
2020	My Salinger Year	Father	
2020	You Will Remember Me (Tu te souviendras de moi)	Mathieu	
2021	Maria Chapdelaine	Le Curé	

=== Television ===
Year	Title	Role	Notes
1997	Ces enfants d'ailleurs	Jan Pawlowski	Miniseries
1998	The Girl Next Door	Kyle Meechum	Television film
1999	The Hunger	Théophile	Episode: "Dream Sentinel"
2000	The Secret Adventures of Jules Verne	Bill Sticker	Episode: "Queen Victoria and the Giant Mole"
2001	Dice	Nick	6 episodes
2002	Jean Duceppe	Pierre Valcourt	Episode: "1955-1959: La famille éclatée"
2003	Bliss	Daniel	Episode: "Aural Sex"
2004	Temps dur	Pic Lavoie	4 episodes
2005	Minuit, le soir	Nino	4 episodes
2006	Live Once, Die Twice	Restaurant Maitre'd	Television film
2006	René Lévesque	Claude Sylvestre	Episode: "Le saut en politique (1958-1960)"
2006	Marie-Antoinette	Comte de Fersen	Television film
2011	Toute la vérité	Alexis Paquette	6 episodes
2012	Fréquences	Gabriel	11 episodes
2012–2019	Unité 9	Bertrand Pariseau	10 episodes
2013–2014	19-2	Sébastien Francoeur	7 episodes
2014	Trauma	Jérôme Lécuyer	Episode: "Corps et esprit"
2014	Côté théâtre	Edward	Episode: "Le chef d'oeuvre de M. Goldman"
2015	Les Jeunes Loups	Philippe St-Pierre	10 episodes
2016	Legacy, a Kate McDougal Investigation	Todd Dawson	6 episodes
2016, 2017	Au secours de Béatrice	Tom	2 episodes
2017–2018	District 31	Me Renaud Gravel	7 episodes
2019	Marika	M. Griffin	6 episodes
2019	Victor Lessard	Abel Parker / Messiah	10 episodes
2019–2021	Pierre Basquet	Enquêteur Langelier	8 episodes
2020	Barkskins	Pierre Gasquet	5 episodes
2021–present	Alertes	Guillaume Pelletier	31 episodes
