= Sandra Kybartas =

Canadian film director

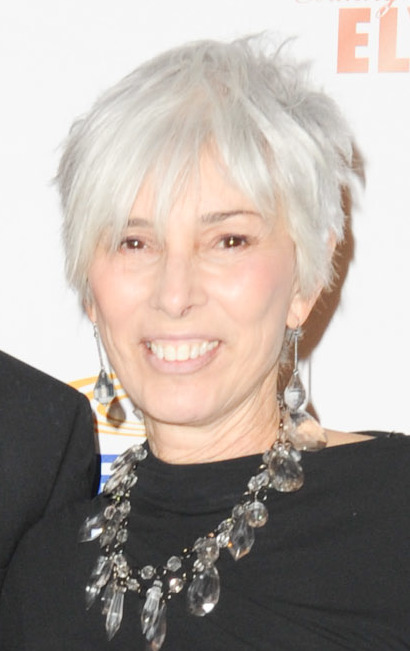

Sandra Kybartas is a Canadian production designer and film director. She was a two-time Genie Award winner at the 17th Genie Awards in 1996, winning Best Art Direction/Production Design for her work on the film Lilies, and Best Theatrical Short Film as director of The Home for Blind Women.

An alumna of the Canadian Film Centre, Kybartas trained in architecture and design before working in film. Her other credits as a designer have included the films Breaking All the Rules, Zero Patience, Camilla, Soul Survivor, Promise the Moon and The Republic of Love, and the television series Due South, The State Within, This Is Wonderland, ReGenesis, Bloodletting & Miraculous Cures, The Listener and Murdoch Mysteries.

She received a Gemini Award nomination for Best Art Direction or Production Design in a Television Film or Miniseries at the 12th Gemini Awards in 1998 for Promise the Moon, and was a two-time Directors Guild of Canada nominee for her work on ReGenesis, winning in 2006 for the episode "Genie in a Bottle".
