= Donald Martin (screenwriter) =

Canadian screenwriter

Donald Martin is a Canadian and American screenwriter. In Canada, he is most noted for the film Never Too Late, starring Olympia Dukakis, for which he was nominated for a Writers Guild of Canada Award and received a Genie Award nomination for Best Original Screenplay at the 17th Genie Awards in 1996, and as the recipient of the Margaret Collier Award, a Lifetime Achievement Award for his body of work in television, at Canada's 25th Gemini Awards in 2010.

He was the inaugural recipient of the Academy of Canadian Cinema & Television's Humanitarian Award in 2001, in honor of his work as a sponsor and supporter of Foster Parents Plan of Canada. In 2002, he received Her Majesty Queen Elizabeth’s Golden Jubilee Medal for his contribution to the arts and for his philanthropy. In 2011, he was honored by Hollywood's LGBTQ foundation "Power Up" for his body of work and for his philanthropy.

Other credits include The Christmas Choir, winner of MovieGuide's Epiphany Prize in 2009, HBO's Dim Sum Funeral, Coming of Age, Too Late to Say Goodbye, starring Rob Lowe, Céline, The Craigslist Killer (listed by Lifetime as one of its top 5 true crime movies ever), the award-winning drama Bomb Girls: Facing the Enemy, Milton's Secret, starring Donald Sutherland, Isabelle, the award-winning comedyToto, Queen Bees, starring Ellen Burstyn, and the Netflix thriller Brazen, starring Alyssa Milano. He was nominated for the 2022 Humanitas Prize for his screenplay Queen Bees, and for writing CBC's Céline he was nominated for a 2009 Gemini Award for Best Writing in a Dramatic Program or Mini-Series.

His first production in 1988 was the drama No Blame, the first movie ever to deal with HIV/AIDS from a woman's point of view. No Blame was invited by the World Health Organization to screen at the 5th International AIDS Conference and the movie won several international awards, including Prince Albert's Red Cross Award at the Monte Carlo Television Festival (1989), as well as earning five nominations at Canada's 1989 Gemini Awards.

He began his writing career as a journalist. He wrote the novel One Out of Four, Coach House Press, Canada (1986). He contributed to Telling It: Writing For Canadian Film & Television, Doubleday, Canada (1996), and he contributed to It's All About Kindness, Cormorant Books, Canada (2012).

He has lectured on screenwriting and taught workshops at Italy's National Academy of Cinema in Bologna, at Singapore's NYU Tisch School of the Arts Asia, at The American Film Institute in Los Angeles, at the USC School of Cinematic Arts in Los Angeles, at the UCLA School of Theater, Film & Television in Los Angeles, at The Los Angeles Film School, at Toronto's Canadian Film Center, and at The Banff Center for the Arts. He leads UCLA Extension's Feature Film Writing Conservatory.

He served as Festival Chair for the 4th International Chinese Original IP Film Festival in October 2026, held at UCLA.

He is a member of the Writers Guild of America West, the Writers Guild of Canada, the Television Academy (U.S.), the British Academy of Film & Television Arts, and the Academy of Canadian Cinema & Television.
