= Johanna Householder =

American-born, Canadian performance artist

- Education: BFA York University 1977
- Known for: Performance Art
- Movement: Performance Art

Johanna Householder is an American-born, Canadian performance artist. Since the late 1970s Householder has made performance works and videos while writing and editing texts about performance art in Canada. In the 1980s, Householder, Louise Garfield and Janice Hladki were members of the feminist performance ensemble The Clichettes, using lip-synching and humour to critique contemporary culture. The Clichettes are considered "the quintessential Bad Girls of Canadian performance of the 70s" and have been called "dangerously and aggressively funny" by Clive Robertson (artist).

She continues to create performance works with a basis in humour and satire including On the Subject of Art, based on a text by Alain Badiou, Performance Festivals redux, and Portrait of a Situation, which was performed in Helsinki, Valparaiso, Chile, Budapest, Bratislava and Cluj, Romania.

Householder helped to found Danceworks and the Women's Cultural Building in the 80s, and the 7a*11d International Festival of Performance Art in 1997.

Householder is a professor in the Integrated Media Program, Faculty of Art at OCAD University, where she is currently Chair of the Criticism and Curatorial Practice Program.

== Books ==
- Caught in the Act: an anthology of performance by Canadian women was edited by Householder and Tanya Mars and published by YYZ Books, Toronto in 2004.
- More Caught in the Act: an anthology of performance by Canadian women was edited by Householder and Tanya Mars and published by YYZ Books, Toronto and Artexte, Montreal in 2016.

== Videos ==
- Performance Festival (2007)
- Vigil - Campo Santo Spirito 2003 (2007)
- Verbatim (2005)
- Approximations (Parts 1 - 3) (2002)
- Next to Last Tango (2001)
- December 31, 2000 (2001)
- The Mission (2000)
- Go to Hell (1985)
- She Devils of Niagara: Act 2 (1985)
- She Devils of Niagara: Act 1 (1985)
