= Clichettes =

Canadian feminist performance art group

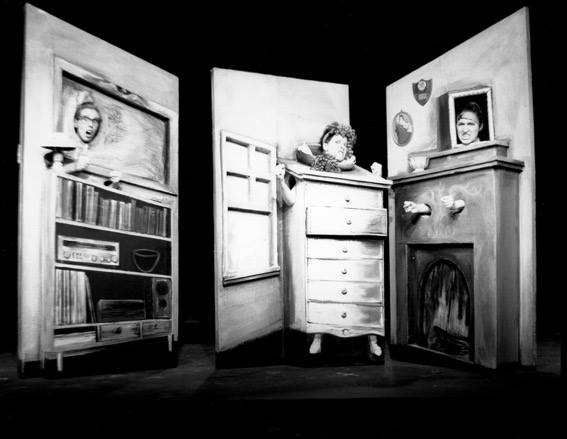
A picture of the Clichettes in the 1980s performing Up Against the Wallpaper.

The Clichettes were an all-women feminist performance art group formed in Toronto, Canada in 1977. They were known for their feminist performance art. The three performers initially worked using lip sync and choreography as their tools to satirize pop culture depictions of femininity and later expanded their practice by including elements from science fiction and theatre in their performances. The group had three choreographers: Johanna Householder, Janice Hladki and Louise Garfield. The Clichettes formed in Toronto and were active in North America from the mid 1970s through 1990s. Their subversive practice was typified by an exaggeration of the hallmarks of contemporaneous female performing groups as well as camp references to drag-performance and science fiction. The depiction of women in mass media was a primary subject of critique and parody in their performances.

== Formation and members ==
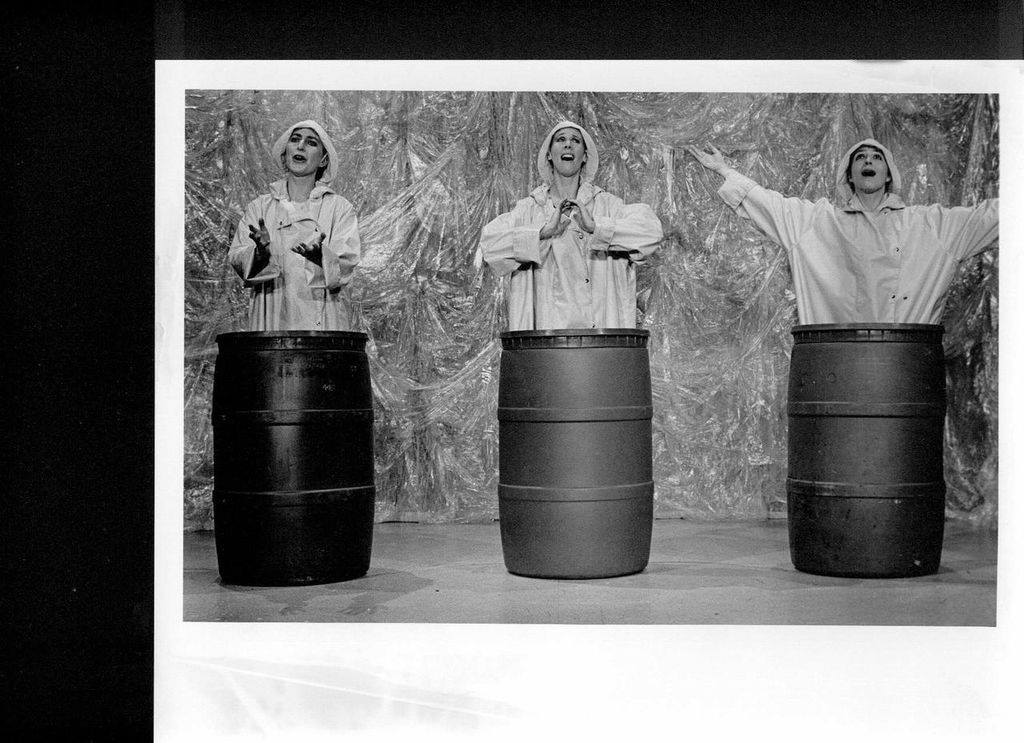
A photograph of The Clichettes performing in She Devils of Niagara.

In the mid 1970s, all three members of The Clichettes were living and performing in Toronto, Ontario. The performers became acquainted with each while working as servers at The Parrot restaurant on Queen Street West. All three members also attended 15 Dance Lab and dance conferences in which they developed and observed each other's individual practices. It was there that they discovered their shared vision to explore a witty, humorous, and feminist approach to performance. Their gravitation towards one another was the result of a mutual admiration of style and desire to resist and parody contemporaneous dance practices. It was around the same time as their meeting that Toronto developed its own official art scene. Coincidentally, it was the Queen Street West area that budded with potential and style - associated with not only music and visual arts, but also theatre, design, fashion, and dancing. Clive Robertson wrote, "it can be argued that the birth of the Clichettes coincided with the birth, or public emergence of Toronto's recent progressive cultural scene." The Clichettes made their debut at the Tele-Performance Festival in 1978, an event themed in response to television as content and technology. Dressed in kitsch-60's good girls outfits, the trio lip-synced to Lesley Gore's "You Don't Own Me" for the first time. The performance was intended to depict the performativity of gender norms. This full-frontal method of feminist assault was greatly inspired by satirical musical group the Hummer Sisters.

Members of the Clichettes were:

- Johanna Householder was born in Alabama in 1949 and attended Oberlin College. Following a brief period in London where she studied choreography, Householder relocated to Toronto where she continued her art and writing practice. Householder describes her initial study of dance as an attempt to learn a medium in order to reject it. Householder has assisted in founding Danceworks and the Women's Cultural Building in the 80s, and the 7a*11d International Festival of Performance Art that is held biannually in Toronto. She is currently a professor in the Integrated Media Program at OCAD university, where she is also the Chair of the Criticism and Curatorial Practice Program.
- Janice Hladki studied at Queens University and later moved to Toronto to study dance at the Toronto Dance Theatre. Hladki was influenced by a trip to the United States where she encountered the work of the Mabou Mines theatre group. An important aspect of Hladki's practice was to combine dance with a feminist consciousness. She is currently an associate professor in theatre and film studies at McMaster University. Hladki is also a founding member of Danceworks and the Woman's Cultural Building.
- Louise Garfield is a trained dancer, choreographer and television producer. She was notorious for dropping out of several institutions prior to the formation of The Clichettes, including York University. Householder admiringly stated that "Lou was the model for quitting". She was motivated by an interest in performative dance, but was dissatisfied with traditional ballet and modern choreography. Later, she studied dance with Gail Mazur in Toronto, where she found her interest in dancing. Garfield was briefly enrolled at York University, which was another meeting place for the three members. Louise Garfield was the executive director at Arts Etobicoke for 13 years since 2004 before retiring, and has been a producer of films including Zero Patience and The Hanging Garden.

== Performances ==
As a feminist performance group, The Clichettes' contested gender stereotypes through the use of pop culture cliches and brash humour. Their brand of camp media parody exemplified the blurring between high art and entertainment occurring in the 1970s. This style of non-detached and ironic pop-culture appropriation enabled them to be critical without alienating their audience. By 1981, the trio's lip-sync performances had begun to expand to include increasing theatricality, and influences were drawn from more subversive sources. Marni Jackson became a collaborator for the production Half-Human Half-Heartache, a move for the group to expand beyond dance and into satirical theatre. The 1981 production featured a narrative casting The Clichettes as aliens who could kill by speaking, thus establishing a narrative purpose for lip-sync. The trio of aliens begins to live the facade of 1960's good-girls but eventually become entangled in the problematic dynamics of this life. The cabaret show was a hit in Toronto, with productions that followed in Ottawa and Vancouver. Their next stage endeavour was more ambitious: She-Devils of Niagara (1985) depicted a dystopian future where gender was strictly regulated, and history had been banished to the basement of a wax museum in Niagara Falls. As the Clichettes' acclaim increased throughout the 1980s, their performances started to poke fun at more than just mass-market depictions of girls. Their 1985 production Go To Hell saw the group adopt anatomically correct male bodysuits as a means to expand their critique to the stereotypes of masculinity. Armed with fake guitars, they parodied the macho posturing of cock rock bands. By spoofing the gestures of those musicians and lip-syncing their lyrics, the Clichettes were denouncing the contrived affectations of male stars. The height of their lip-sync career came in 1984, when they travelled to Houston, Texas, to compete and won the grand prize in the National Lip-Sync Contest. The Clichettes disbanded in 1993.

== Legacy ==
The Clichettes' impact on the practices of Canadian dance, performance and feminist art is extensive. The success of their performances proved that cultural criticism could also be fun, rather than strictly moralistic; and control of the means of representation could be a playful engagement with the "oppressor". In 2017, the group was commemorated in a virtual exhibition, 150 Years | 150 Works, celebrating the history of Canadian art for Canada's 150th anniversary. The exhibit showcased works that have shaped or changed the country's history over the past century and a half and selected The Clichette's famous Go to Hell (1985) lip-sync performance as a feature. The trio's enduring impact on Canadian dance is evident in that several Clichettes performances are frequently recreated by Danny Grossman's dancers.
