= Alexander Chapman =

Canadian actor

Alexander Chapman is a Canadian actor. He is best known for his role as Lydie-Anne in Lilies, for which he garnered a Genie Award nomination for Best Supporting Actor at the 17th Genie Awards.

Chapman, who has also performed as a drag queen under the name Titty Galore, has also had supporting roles in Space Cases, Welcome to Africville, Fig Trees, After Alice, Jesus of Montreal, Queer as Folk, Sugar, The Kids in the Hall, Tru Love and Murder in Passing, often but not always playing a drag queen or a transgender woman.

He has also performed extensively in stage roles, including in Canadian Stage's production of Angels in America.

== Filmography ==
=== Film ===
Year	Title	Role	Notes
1987	Wild Thing	Shakes	
1989	Snake Eater II: The Drug Buster	Terrance	
1990	Princes in Exile	Gabriel	
1990	Back Stab	Bob the Guard	
1992	Snake Eater 3: His Law	Salesman	
1993	Entangled	Johnny	
1996	Lilies	Lydie-Anne	
2000	After Alice	Claudette	
2000	Rats and Rabbits	Dominic	
2004	Sugar	Natasha	
2013	Tru Love	Gray	

=== Television ===
Year	Title	Role	Notes
1987	The Magical World of Disney	Joseph	Episode: "The Liberators"
1995	Hart to Hart: Two Harts in 3/4 Time	Freddy	Television film
1996	Space Cases	Ubi	Episode: "Long Distance Calls"
2002	Queer as Folk	Emmett's Dance Partner	Episode: "Pride"
2002	A Killing Spring	Transvestite Hooker	Television film
2021	American Gods	Saluting Officer	Episode: "The Rapture of Burning"
