= Too Late to Say Goodbye =

- Based on: Too Late to Say Goodbye by Ann Rule
- Screenplay by: Fab Filippo; Donald Martin; Adam Till
- Directed by: Norma Bailey
- Starring: Rob Lowe; Lauren Holly
- Theme music composer: Michael Alemania; John Pratt
- Country of origin: United States
- Original language: English

Production
- Executive producers: Scott W. Anderson; Stanley Brooks; Jim Head
- Producer: Nicholas Tabarrok
- Cinematography: Mathias Herndl
- Editors: Ron Wisman; Ron Wisman Jr.
- Running time: 95 minutes
- Production companies: Darius Productions; Head First Productions

Original release
- Network: Lifetime Movie Network
- Release: November 7, 2009

Too Late to Say Goodbye is a 2009 American-Canadian television film directed by Norma Bailey and starring Rob Lowe and Lauren Holly. It is based on the 2007 true crime book of the same name by Ann Rule.

After Bart Corbin's (Rob Lowe) wife Jenn dies in their home, Heather (Lauren Holly), Jenn's sister, starts a relentless campaign to make the police believe Bart murdered her.

== Cast ==
- Rob Lowe as Bart Corbin
- Lauren Holly as Heather
- Michelle Hurd as Det. Anne Roche
- Stefanie von Pfetten as Jenn Corbin
- Marc Bendavid as Sam Malveau
- Rosemary Dunsmore as Narda Barber
- Art Hindle as Max Barber
- Yannick Bisson as Bobby Corbin

== Production ==
The film was shot in Ontario.

== Reception ==
Sloan Freer of Radio Times awarded the film two stars out of five.
