= Caux (surname) =

Caux is a surname. Notable people with the surname include:

- Jean Caux, the most famous mule packer of the Canadian West
- Marcel Caux (1899–2004), Australian World War I veteran
- Philippe Caux (born 1973), French curler, 2002 Winter Olympics participant
- Robert Caux, Canadian musician
