= Barbara Nichol =

Canadian writer

- Born: Vancouver, British Columbia, Canada
- Occupations: writer and documentary maker
- Writing career
- Notable awards: Mr. Christie's Book Awards (1998)

Barbara Nichol (born c. 1956) is a Canadian writer and documentary maker.

== Personal life and education ==
Nichol was born in Vancouver, British Columbia, the daughter of John Lang Nichol and Elizabeth Fellowes, founder of the Equinox Gallery. She was educated at Westcot Elementary School and Crofton House School in Vancouver, at Elmwood School in Ottawa, The Branson School in Ross, California and St Clare's, Oxford. She attended the University of Toronto and the University of British Columbia but did not graduate from either.

Her sisters are Marjorie Nichol, a radio producer and journalist, most recently the executive producer of the Canadian Broadcasting Corporation's "Sunday Edition", and Sarah Milroy, a critic and writer on the visual arts, now the Director of the McMichael Canadian Art Collection.

== Career ==
Nichol has written and produced over 25 radio documentaries for the Canadian Broadcasting Corporation and has written comedy and humour for radio, magazines and television. She wrote scripts for the Canadian version of Sesame Street from 1985 to 1994 and worked as a script editor on the international edition of the show.

Nichol was a founding editor of the Canadian magazine The Walrus.

Nichol wrote the book and lyrics (music by Tom Bellman) for the Canadian musical "The Sparrow Songs: A Country Song String," which was featured at The Summerworks Festival in August 2011, ran at Hugh's Room in Toronto and the Festival of Ideas and Creation at Canadian Stage in 2012.

She has received a Canadian Juno award, for her original, multi platinum recording of Beethoven Lives Upstairs, a Canal + award for The Home For Blind Women, has been a Governor General's Award finalist for her children's book Dippers and won the Mr. Christie Prize for Biscuits in The Cupboard, a book of verse. She was nominated for a Juno Award as well for producing and directing the children's play series "A Story For A Child." The series was released as a recording by BMI.

She received an Emmy nomination for her Sesame Street special "Basil Hears a Noise."

== Awards and honours ==
Awards for Nichol's work
Year	Title	Award	Result	Ref.
1996	The Home for Blind Women	Genie Award	Winner	
1996	The Home for Blind Women	Golden Spire Award for Best Short Film under 15 minutes	Winner	
1997	Dippers	Governor General's Award for English-language children's literature	Shortlist	
1998	Biscuits in the Cupboard	Mr. Christie's Book Awards (English, 7 and under)	Winner	
1998	Dippers	Toronto Book Awards	Shortlist	

== Publications ==
- Beethoven Lives Upstairs, illustrated by Scott Cameron (1989)
- Biscuits in the Cupboard, illustrated by Philippe Béha (1997) (Verse)
- Dippers, illustrated by Barry Moser (1997)
- One Small Garden (2001)
- Trunks All Aboard: An Elephant ABC, illustrated by W. Cornelius Van Horne (2001)
- Safe and Sound, illustrated by Anja Reichel (2003)
- Tales Of Don Quixote (an adaptation for children) (2004)
- Tales of Don Quixote, Book II (an adaptation for children) (2006)
- The Lady from Kent: A Story for Girls and Boys and Bees Dressed Up As Fleas and Crocodiles. Also Elves, illustrated by Bill Pechet, edited by Beth Follett (2018)
