= Home Free (2024 film) =

2024 Canadian drama film

- Directed by: Avi Federgreen
- Written by: Reese Eveneshen; Avi Federgreen
- Produced by: Emily Andrews; Avi Federgreen; Emily Foster; Jen Pogue; Julia Tomasone; Laura Tremblay
- Starring: Natalie Brown; Michelle Nolden; Tara Spencer-Nairn; Art Hindle
- Cinematography: Paul D. Maxwell
- Edited by: Ben Lee Allan
- Music by: Lydia Ainsworth
- Production company: Federgreen Entertainment
- Distributed by: IndieCan Entertainment
- Release date: September 18, 2024 (Cinéfest)
- Running time: 96 minutes
- Country: Canada
- Language: English

Home Free is a Canadian drama film, directed by Avi Federgreen and released in 2024. The film stars Natalie Brown, Michelle Nolden and Tara Spencer-Nairn as Daisy, Rain and Ivy, three sisters who return home for their parents' fiftieth wedding anniversary, only to face the news that their father Herb (Art Hindle) is dying of brain cancer.

The cast also includes Jill Frappier, Al Mukadam, Gord Rand, Carina Battrick, Antonina Battrick, Valentina Battrick, Breeze Dango and Micah Mensah-Jatoe in supporting roles.

The film was shot in spring 2023 in the Paris, Ontario area. Much of it was shot at Nolden's farmhouse.

The film premiered at the 2024 Cinéfest Sudbury International Film Festival.
