= Mistaken Identity (film) =

- French: Erreur sur la personne
- Directed by: Gilles Noël
- Written by: Gilles Noël; Claude Cartier
- Produced by: Michel Brault; Anouk Brault
- Starring: Michel Côté; Macha Grenon; Paul Doucet
- Cinematography: Sylvain Brault
- Edited by: Dominique Fortin
- Music by: Jean Vanasse
- Production company: Nanouk Films
- Release date: September 21, 1996 (Cinéfest)
- Running time: 95 minutes
- Country: Canada
- Language: French

Mistaken Identity (French: Erreur sur la personne), also sometimes billed as Mistaken Person, is a Canadian thriller film, directed by Gilles Noël and released in 1996.

The film stars Michel Côté as Charles Renard, a police officer returning to work for the first time since being left hearing impaired by a bullet wound to the head. He is assigned to investigate Maria (Macha Grenon), an actress who is robbing men to finance a stage production of August Strindberg's Miss Julie. The film's cast also includes Paul Doucet, Marie-Andrée Corneille, Robert Gravel, Paul Savoie and Luc Picard.

At the 17th Genie Awards, Corneille was nominated for Best Supporting Actress.
