= Linda Muir =

Canadian costume designer

- Occupation: Costume designer
- Years active: 1975–present

Linda Muir is a Canadian costume designer, best known for her frequent collaborations with director Robert Eggers. Her accolades include a Costume Designers Guild Award, in addition to nominations for an Academy Award and a BAFTA Award.

Muir has received four nominations for the Canadian Screen Award for Best Costume Design and has won twice for Exotica (1994) and Lilies (1996). She faced a formidable challenge while working on the latter film, not the least in designing a very excellent ballroom gown for male actor Rémy Girard. Muir said that her approach was "not to dress men in women's clothing but to build [female] costumes for men's bodies."

Muir joined the crew for Robert Eggers' feature directorial debut The Witch in December 2013. During the preproduction period, she conducted exhaustive research, which included consulting 35 books from the Clothes of the Common People in Elizabethan and Early Stuart England series provided by Eggers, as well as other books and images on 17th-century fashion. She had also examined photographs of original garments in the permanent collections of the Victoria and Albert Museum in London and the Fashion Museum, Bath, that she took back in 1984. Muir created authentic-looking film wardrobes made of wool, linen, or hemp for an ensemble of nine principal characters. Operating on a limited budget, she pushed for an increase in order to better meet the screenplay's demands, thereby bringing the director's vision to fruition.

== Filmography ==
=== Film ===
Year	Title	Director	Notes
1989	Cold Comfort	Vic Sarin	
1993	Thirty Two Short Films About Glenn Gould	François Girard	
1994	Exotica	Atom Egoyan	
1995	When Night Is Falling	Patricia Rozema	
1996	Long Day's Journey into Night	David Wellington	
1996	Lilies	John Greyson	
1997	The Assistant	Daniel Petrie	
1998	Dog Park	Bruce McCulloch	
1999	Jacob Two Two Meets the Hooded Fang	George Bloomfield	
2000	Three Stories from the End of Everything	Semi Chellas	Short film
2000	The Perfect Son	Leonard Farlinger	
2003	Foolproof	William Phillips	
2007	All Hat	Leonard Farlinger	
2011	Mulroney: The Opera	Larry Weinstein	
2012	The Secret Disco Revolution	Jamie Kastner	Documentary
2015	The Witch	Robert Eggers	
2016	Rupture	Steven Shainberg	
2019	The Lighthouse	Robert Eggers	
2019	Random Acts of Violence	Jay Baruchel	
2020	The Silencing	Robin Pront	Additional costume designer
2022	The Northman	Robert Eggers	
2024	Nosferatu	Robert Eggers	
2026	Werwulf	Robert Eggers	

=== Television ===
Year	Title	Notes
1987	Sharon, Lois & Bram's Elephant Show	2 episodes
1988–1991	My Secret Identity	69 episodes
1994	Hostage for a Day	Television film
1996	Kratts' Creatures	Episode: "Big Five, Little Five"
1997	Borrowed Hearts	Television film
1997	On the 2nd Day of Christmas	Television film
1998	Nothing Too Good for a Cowboy	Television film and pilot
1998	Little Men	3 episodes
2000	Flowers for Algernon	Television film
2002	Torso: The Evelyn Dick Story	Television film
2002	The Associates	17 episodes
2002–2005	The Eleventh Hour	38 episodes
2008–2009	Life with Derek	18 episodes
2012	XIII: The Series	13 episodes
2015–2016	Bitten	20 episodes
2017	Ransom	2 episodes
2017–2018	Murdoch Mysteries	19 episodes

== Awards and nominations ==
Major associations

Academy Awards

Year	Category	Nominated work	Result	Ref.
2025	Best Costume Design	Nosferatu	Nominated	

BAFTA Awards

Year	Category	Nominated work	Result	Ref.
British Academy Film Awards
2025	Best Costume Design	Nosferatu	Nominated	

Miscellaneous awards

List of Linda Muir other awards and nominations
Award	Year (Note: Indicates the year of ceremony. Each year is linked to the article about the awards held that year, wherever possible.)	Category	Title	Result	Ref.
Astra Film and Creative Arts Awards	2024	Best Costume Design	Nosferatu	Nominated	
Chicago Film Critics Association Awards	2022	Best Costume Design	The Northman	Nominated	
Chicago Film Critics Association Awards	2024	Best Costume Design	Nosferatu	Nominated	
Costume Designers Guild Awards	2025	Excellence in Period Film	Nosferatu	Won	
Critics' Choice Awards	2025	Best Costume Design	Nosferatu	Nominated	
Dora Mavor Moore Awards	1982	Outstanding Costume Design, General Theatre	Tamara	Won	
Dora Mavor Moore Awards	1992	Outstanding Design, Small Theatre	Jump	Won	
Fangoria Chainsaw Awards	2025	Best Costume Design	Nosferatu	Won	
Gemini Awards (Note: merged with the Genie Awards in 2013 to form the Canadian Screen Awards)	2002	Best Costume Design	Torso: The Evelyn Dick Story	Nominated	
Genie Awards (Note: succeeded the Canadian Film Awards (1949–78) and were merged with the Gemini Awards in 2013 to form the Canadian Screen Awards)	1994	Best Costume Design	Exotica	Won	
Genie Awards	1996	Best Costume Design	When Night Is Falling	Nominated	
Genie Awards	1996	Best Costume Design	Lilies	Won	
Genie Awards	2000	Best Costume Design	Jacob Two Two Meets the Hooded Fang	Nominated	
Las Vegas Film Critics Society Awards	2016	Best Costume Design	The Witch	Won	
Las Vegas Film Critics Society Awards	2022	Best Costume Design	The Northman	Nominated	
Las Vegas Film Critics Society Awards	2024	Best Costume Design	Nosferatu	Nominated	
Online Film Critics Society Awards	2025	Best Costume Design	Nosferatu	Nominated	
Satellite Awards	2025	Best Costume Design	Nosferatu	Nominated	
Seattle Film Critics Society Awards	2017	Best Costume Design	The Witch	Nominated	
Seattle Film Critics Society Awards	2023	Best Costume Design	The Northman	Nominated	
Seattle Film Critics Society Awards	2024	Best Costume Design	Nosferatu	Nominated	
St. Louis Film Critics Association Awards	2024	Best Costume Design	Nosferatu	Runner-up	

== See also ==
- List of Canadian Academy Award winners and nominees
