= The Republic of Love =

- Directed by: Deepa Mehta
- Written by: Carol Shields (novel), Deepa Mehta (screen story)
- Produced by: Anna Stratton; Julie Baines
- Cinematography: Douglas Koch
- Edited by: Barry Farrell
- Music by: Talvin Singh
- Release dates: September 11, 2003 (Toronto International Film Festival); February 13, 2004
- Running time: 95 minutes
- Countries: Canada; United Kingdom; Denmark
- Language: English

The Republic of Love is a 2003 Canadian-British-Danish romantic comedy-drama film directed by Deepa Mehta. It is based on the novel of the same name by Carol Shields and stars Bruce Greenwood and Emilia Fox. It premiered at the Toronto International Film Festival in 2003. It was released publicly on February 13, 2004.

== Plot ==
The plot centers on a charismatic radio talk show host, Tom Avery, and his "mermaid researcher" girlfriend Fay. Tom has had a turbulent past with relationships and has had three divorces before the age of 40. Many of Tom's ex-wives turn out to be friends of Fay's. Fay has an overly high expectation of the men she dates; she expects perfection and wants to emulate her parents' rock-solid marriage. One day, it turns out that Fay's parents' marriage is not as perfect as it seemed and it breaks down suddenly, after 40 years of "wedded bliss.” Fay panics and feels insecure in her own relationship and forces Tom to go to great lengths to convince her that their relationship is different and that they are meant for each other.

== Cast ==
- Bruce Greenwood as Tom
- Emilia Fox as Fay
- Edward Fox as Richard
- Martha Henry as Audrey
- Jan Rubes as Strom
- Gary Farmer as Ted
- Lloyd Owen as Peter
- Jackie Burroughs as Betty
- Juan Chioran as Monsieur Martineau
- Rebecca Jenkins as Maeve
- Kate Lynch as Dr. French
- David Stratton as Clyde
- Kristen Thomson as Charlotte
- Claire Bloom as Onion

== Production ==
=== Development ===
The film is based on the novel The Republic of Love by Carol Shields and the characters of Tom and Fay were created by her. The Republic of Love was conceived as a film adaptation in 1996, when Triptych Media producer, Anna Stratton read the book and was highly impressed with its humour and diversity of characters, and confessed to being a fan of Shields's writing. She said, “It was the characters really that offered up a delicious cast for a film. I was also drawn in by the humour –characters, situations and events that made me laugh out loud and the interweaving of the magical elements – the mermaid myth and Tom’s middle of the night radio life – with the love story. The story itself is classic – rapture, rupture, reconciliation – and love stories are one of the most popular filmic forms."

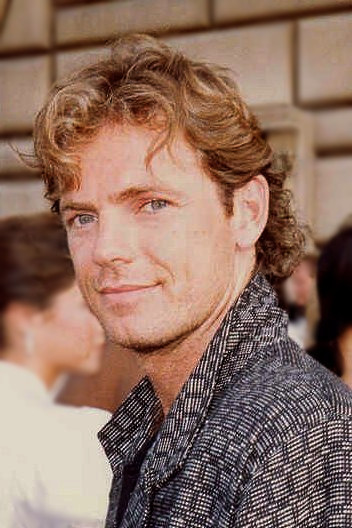
Canadian actor Bruce Greenwood (1987)

Once Stratton had decided to produce the film, she looked to the United Kingdom to provide sufficient resources and for a co-producer, given the popularity of Shield's work in the UK. Stratton met British producer Julie Baines in 1998 in San Francisco in 1998 and discussed a collaboration with Baines's Dan Films company and Triptych Media. In the summer of 2000, Stratton approached director Deepa Mehta, who fell in love with the story and commented, "The book, a treatise on the nature of love, attracted me, as it is complex and yet accessible. It is really about different aspects of love – mature love, familial love, sibling love and the nature of love and how elusive it is”. Mehta recommended Bruce Greenwood to play the role of Tom and subsequently attracted him to the role. Meanwhile, Stratton and Baines had remained in contact and met once again in early 2002 to discuss financing the project together and to find the female lead in Emilia Fox. Fox was immediately enticed by the character of Fay and said of the plot, “It mixes the idealistic with the realistic which I thought was very clever, and there’s a strong balance, there’s something we can hold onto.” Producers Chris Auty, Bruce Duggan, Sarah Green, Bruce Greenwood, Mehernaz Lentin, Neil Peplow, Sarah Sulick and Claire Welland would later join the production team.

=== Script and adaption ===
According to Carol Shields, her basis for plot was that she loved stories that place lovers in isolation and wanted to " position my pair of lovers firmly in the midst of their community where the networks of family and friends form the real street maps." Shields's perception of love is a mythical one, and she has said, " Love is, in the end, a magic and mythical force, inexplicable, indecipherable. Its arrival cannot be arranged nor its properties deconstructed. We can only marvel, as I hope the audience of this film will marvel, that, despite our fear and cynicism, it occasionally enters our lives and transforms us." This mysticism is intended to be reflected in the occupations of the characters with Fay’s involvement with mermaids intended to accentuate her existence with a mythic quality while Tom's charisma over the air waves and his impact on other people's lives is intended to give a magical dimension.

In adapting the script for the screen, Mehta mused over possible techniques that would capture the elusive nature of love on film and compared it to cooking an exotic dish where love is the main ingredient. In the end she collaborated with Esta Spalding to produce the final script for the film version of the book. Carol Shields was unable to write for the film adaption because of her declining health. She was never able to see the final result, as she died on July 16, 2003, but during pre-production she would occasionally visit, with her husband, to approve of design drawings and photographs of the cast and costumes to be employed.

=== Filming ===
The Republic of Love was shot on location in and around Toronto between November and December 2002. In selecting filming location, producer Anna Stratton felt it important to encapture the atmosphere of the novel by filming in a cold city during the winter. She was also influenced by the line that Tom says to Fay in the film, "geography is destiny" and believed the screen provided a rich visual opportunity to reflect this element of Shields's storytelling. The novel itself was set in Winnipeg but in filming in Toronto, Mehta attempted to recreate the "Republic" and to provide a paradigm where the characters’ paths could criss cross and they would eventually meet each other. Frequent collaborators, production designer Sandra Kybartas, and cinematographer Douglas Koch were brought in to create the republic setting. They made many experimentations with the lighting style to reflect the contrast of mood in many scenes and to emphasise the strength of the love between the lead characters and their physical beauty, whilst maintaining a delicate balance.

Mehta later cited that the film was the most difficult she had ever experienced, given the ongoing financial anxieties and a series of mishaps on set and filming delays which led her to believe that the film was jinxed.

== Reception ==
On the review aggregator website Rotten Tomatoes, 44% of 9 critics' reviews are positive, with an average rating of 5.5/10. A number of critics noted that they were impressed with the performances of the main characters, and several indicated that they approved of the variety of emotions displayed by the actors, with critics such as Bruce Kirkland of The Toronto Sun remarking that, "It is a treasure that speaks directly to the idea of love as an ephemeral emotion in all its complexity", and felt that the minimal dialogue between actors Bruce Greenwood and Emilia Fox meant that "… when they actually do talk, offering little glimpses into their tortured psyches, a seemingly insignificant conversation seems to take on a profound weight." Liam Lacey of The Globe and Mail concurred, noting the charisma of the cast and highlighting a believable magnetic charge between Greenwood and Fox. Negative reviews included Brian Gibson of the Vue Weekly in Edmonton, saying "The tiresome zaniness and Seinfeldian conceits might be forgivable if the romantic plot weren’t so full of empty truisms and nonsense lines that would stump a Zen monk." Film critic Christopher Null criticized the directing of Deepa Mehta, saying that she "does nothing to make this palatable. In fact, she goes out of her way to distance us from the story and the characters, most notably through washing the entire movie into total gray…".
