= For the Sake of Vicious =

2020 Canadian thriller film

- Directed by: Gabriel Carrer; Reese Eveneshen
- Written by: Gabriel Carrer; Reese Eveneshen
- Produced by: Gabriel Carrer; Reese Eveneshen; Avi Federgreen
- Starring: Lora Burke; Nick Smyth; Colin Paradine
- Cinematography: Alex Tong
- Edited by: Reese Eveneshen
- Music by: Gabriel Carrer
- Production companies: Federgreen Entertainment; Latefox Pictures
- Distributed by: Raven Banner Entertainment
- Release date: September 2, 2020 (Fantasia)
- Running time: 80 minutes
- Country: Canada
- Language: English

For the Sake of Vicious is a Canadian thriller film, written and directed by Gabriel Carrer and Reese Eveneshen and released in 2020. The film stars Lora Burke as Romina, a nurse who comes home from work only to be forced into a violent dispute between her landlord Alan (Colin Paradine) and Chris (Nick Smyth), a man who has taken Alan hostage in her home with a claim that Alan raped his daughter several years earlier.

The cast also includes James Fler, T.J. Kennedy, Adam Ewings, Boris Milinkovich, Nick Newell, Dorian Allen, Mavis Ruth Stuart, Ayden Bryce, Alexis Kordupel, Erin Stuart, Billy Cottrell-Jackson, Jim Luesink and Mac Young in supporting roles.

The film premiered at the 2020 Fantasia Film Festival. It was later added to the Shudder platform in 2022.

== Critical response ==
Phil Hoad of The Guardian wrote that "sadly, when Alan manages to call in outside help, the film drops this high-tension triangle and lets slip the dogs of gore. This squanders some impressively unhinged acting by Smyth, alternating between a rigid thousand-mile stare and surges of raving abandon that suggest an out-of-body experience. One early, promising scene in which Sarah resuscitates Alan with one hand while sweet-talking her son on the phone with the other showcases all the tension lost in the glassy-eyed – and sometimes illogically staged – bloodbath that takes over. The daft title tries to promise splatterhouse brazenness, but actually fesses up to the film’s lack of imagination."

For RogerEbert.com, Simon Abrams wrote that "is slightly more memorable for what Carrer and Eveneshen try to do than for what they fail to deliver. They’ve got (some of) the right ideas, but aren’t polished or as ruthless as they need to be yet. It’s probably telling that my favorite image from “For the Sake of Vicious” isn't anything gross, but rather an almost screwball-style bit of physical comedy. During an especially heated fight scene, Chris and Romina bump elbows while trying to disentangle themselves from a pair of the above-mentioned masked killers. Weapons are put to good use, shower curtains are torn down ... and in the heat of the moment, Chris and Romina bump into each other like they're competitive dancers in an unexpectedly cramped ballroom. That's just a brief moment between bloodlettings, but it's also light and canny enough to leave you wanting more."
