= Robert Caux =

Robert Caux is a musician, composer, sound designer and sound engineer based in Quebec City.

After studying baroque organ at Laval University, he became very well known on Quebec City's theatre scene by composing the soundtrack of an impressive number of plays. He was closely associated with Robert Lepage for many years, as he composed the music from his plays Needles and Opium, The Dragons' Trilogy and Elsinore, for which he won 1995's Masque (Quebec's equivalent of a Tony Award) for original music. He also composed the music of Lepage's second feature film, Polygraph (Le Polygraphe).

He's currently the head sound technician at Le Grand Théâtre de Québec, Quebec City.
