= Never Too Late (1996 film) =

1996 film by Giles Walker

- DVD cover
- Directed by: Giles Walker
- Written by: Donald Martin
- Produced by: Tom Berry; Stefan Wodoslawsky
- Starring: Olympia Dukakis; Cloris Leachman; Corey Haim; Matt Craven
- Cinematography: Savas Kalogeras
- Edited by: Ion Webster
- Music by: Normand Corbeil
- Distributed by: Allegro Films Distribution
- Release date: August 26, 1996
- Running time: 96 minutes
- Country: Canada
- Language: English

Never Too Late is a 1996 Canadian comedy-drama film starring Olympia Dukakis, Jean Lapointe, Cloris Leachman and Corey Haim. It was filmed in Montreal, Quebec.

== Plot summary ==
Joseph, Rose, and Olive, three friends and residents of a retirement home, suspect Carl, the home's owner, of embezzling funds meant for their care. They band together to protect their ailing friend Woody from potential exploitation and ensure that Carl is held accountable for his actions.

== Cast ==
- Olympia Dukakis as Rose
- Cloris Leachman as Olive
- Jan Rubeš as Joseph
- Matt Craven as Carl
- Jean Lapointe as Woody
- Corey Haim as Max

== Awards ==
At the 17th Genie Awards in 1996, Paola Ridolfi received a nomination for Best Art Direction/Production Design, and Donald Martin was nominated for Best Original Screenplay.
