= Emotional Arithmetic =

- Theatrical release poster
- Directed by: Paolo Barzman
- Written by: Jefferson Lewis (Screenplay); Matt Cohen (Novel)
- Produced by: Suzanne Girard (BBR Productions [Bullet Proof]); Anna Stratton (Triptych Media [Heyday])
- Starring: Susan Sarandon; Christopher Plummer; Gabriel Byrne; Roy Dupuis; Max von Sydow
- Cinematography: Luc Montpellier
- Edited by: Arthur Tarnowski
- Music by: Normand Corbeil
- Distributed by: Seville Pictures and Dreammachine; Image Entertainment (video)
- Release dates: September 15, 2007 (Toronto International Film Festival); April 18, 2008 (Canada)
- Running time: 99 minutes
- Country: Canada
- Language: English

Emotional Arithmetic is a 2007 Canadian drama film directed by Paolo Barzman, based on the novel by Matt Cohen, about the emotional consequences for three Holocaust survivors when they are reunited decades later. The film stars Gabriel Byrne, Roy Dupuis, Christopher Plummer, Susan Sarandon, and Max von Sydow. It opened at the Toronto International Film Festival, in Toronto, Ontario, Canada, on September 15, 2007, and was released, in Canada, on April 18, 2008.

When released by Image Entertainment on DVD in the US, on July 22, 2008, the film's title differed from that of its theatrical release; the US DVD is called Autumn Hearts: A New Beginning.

== Plot ==
Emotional Arithmetic focuses primarily on three people who formed a bond in the Drancy internment camp, where they were imprisoned by the Nazis during World War II: Jakob Bronski (Sydow), who saw goodness in two orphaned children in the camp, Melanie (Sarandon) and Christopher (Byrne), and who helped them to survive. Decades after their release from Drancy, their emotional wounds still affect their lives in different ways when they meet again.

Now in her 50s, Melanie is married to David Winters (Plummer), a cold and grouchy older professor of history, who was once her teacher and who has been unfaithful to her with his current students. A now-elderly poet, Jakob, having survived the gulag, has recently been released from a Russian psychiatric hospital. Christopher, a non-Jewish Irishman who had been interred at Drancy by mistake, now works as an entomologist in Paris.

The three are reunited at a farm in the Eastern Townships of Quebec, where Melanie and David live with their grown son, Benjamin (Dupuis), a gourmet cook, who prepares a "life-changing" meal served outside, at a table set up under a tree.

The film's title highlights the complex "emotional arithmetic" of bitterness, jealousy, and love exposed as the characters confront the past, reconcile their feelings about one another, and struggle to move on.

== Cast ==
- Susan Sarandon as Melanie Lansing Winters
- Christopher Plummer as David Winters
- Gabriel Byrne as Christopher Lewis
- Roy Dupuis as Benjamin Winters
- Max von Sydow as Jakob Bronski
- Dakota Goyo as Timmy Winters
- Domini Blythe as Jane Radley
- Kris Holden-Ried as Young Jakob
- Alexandre Nachi as Young Christopher

== Critique ==
Reviewing the TIFF début of the film, Rocchi writes:

Emotional Arithmetic plays out in a series of fairly predictable scenes — resentments simmer, past pain comes to light, rapprochements are formed. Emotional Arithmetic tries to paint a picture of the long-term emotional effects of political atrocities, which is certainly an important topic. But, again, it feels like a film that was made to be about an important topic — it's a little too obvious, a little too on-the-nose, a little familiar. Emotional Arithmetic has the best of intentions; it's just that its whole is far less than the sum of the parts.

In contrast, Foundas is kinder to the film, observing that it is:

less a straight matter of addition or subtraction than it is a complex algebra equation, with multiple variables that all have a bearing on the sum. It is also, much like the film that opened Toronto this year, Jeremy Podeswa's "Fugitive Pieces," another visually lush, dramatically obvious story of Holocaust survivors still wrestling with the ghosts of their past, several decades on from the end of World War II. Generally solid performances and Barzman's sensitive handling help to elevate the pic above the realm of the familiar and could result in okay arthouse biz among auds not yet exhausted by the subject matter.

Yet, echoing Marchand's title (""Munch Ado about Nothing: 'Emotional Arithmetic': Dreary by the Numbers"), in a review after the film's release, Braun observes: "How people deal with the aftermath of tragedy is a fascinating subject, but the feelings involved are never conveyed in this film. Emotional Arithmetic is all about the math, not the emotion; it's all brain and no heart as far as the filmmaking goes."
