= Anna Stratton =

Canadian film and television producer

- Spouse: Tom Campbell
- Website: http://www.triptychmedia.ca

Anna Stratton is a Canadian film and television producer and actress. Her projects include the feature films Zero Patience (1993), Lilies, for which she won a 1996 Genie Award for Best Motion Picture, and Emotional Arithmetic (2007). Her work in television includes the children's program L'Histoire de l'Oie.

== Biography ==
Anna Stratton is a graduate of the Canadian Film Centre and has a background in the theatre, where she worked as a producer, administrator and educator and as Head of English Language Theatre for the Canada Council. She produced many stage productions, including the hit play, Tamara. Anna has served on many boards and committees including the Feature Film Project of the Canadian Film Centre, Dance Umbrella of Ontario, the First Night Festival and the Toronto Theatre Festival. She is a co-founder of Reel Canada, the festival of films for high schools, the Producer's Roundtable of Ontario and serves on the OMDC advisory group for screen-based industries.

One of the founders of Toronto-based Triptych Media in 1994, Anna and partner Robin Cass bring together their backgrounds in the theatre and visual arts to develop film and television entertainment. The company's slate runs the gamut from comedy to drama, with properties chosen for the strength of their characters, story-telling and social relevance. Triptych's productions include Falling Angels, The Republic of Love, The Hanging Garden, Lilies and Zero Patience as well as for its television dramas Lucky Girl, The Tale of Teeka (French title: L'Histoire de L'Oie) and Gordon Pinsent's Heyday! The company is an active co-production partner internationally.

Triptych's later films included Gary Yates' feature High Life, based on the hit play by Lee MacDougall; Emotional Arithmetic, based on the novel by the late Matt Cohen, directed by Paolo Barzman and starring Susan Sarandon, Christopher Plummer, Gabriel Byrne, Roy Dupuis and Max von Sydow. Triptych is executive producer on Richie Mehta's feature debut, Amal and on the documentary As Slow as Possible by Scott Smith.

In 2019, Stratton retired from Triptych Media, which became a division of Avi Federgreen's studio Federgreen Entertainment.

== Filmography ==
- The Girl King (2015) (producer)
- High Life (2009) (executive producer)
- Emotional Arithmetic (2007) (producer) (Autumn Hearts: A New Beginning in U.S.)
- Heyday! (2006) (TV) (producer)
- The Republic of Love (2003) (producer)
- The Bay of Love and Sorrows (2002) (producer) (Baie de l'amour et des regrets, La, French title in Canada)
- The Bookfair Murders (2000) (TV) (executive producer) (producer)
- L'Histoire de l'Oie (1998) (TV) (executive producer) (The Tale of Teeka in Canada)
- Lilies - Les feluettes (1996) (producer) (Lilies, short and French title in Canada)
- Zero Patience (1993) (producer)
