= The Hanging Garden (film) =

1997 British-Canadian film

- Promotional poster
- Directed by: Thom Fitzgerald
- Written by: Thom Fitzgerald
- Produced by: Thom Fitzgerald; Louise Garfield; Arnie Gelbart
- Starring: Chris Leavins; Troy Veinotte; Sarah Polley; Peter MacNeill; Seana McKenna
- Cinematography: Daniel Jobin
- Edited by: Susan Shanks
- Music by: John Roby
- Distributed by: Alliance Communications (Canada); Alliance Releasing (United Kingdom)
- Release date: September 5, 1997 (TIFF)
- Running time: 91 minutes
- Language: English
- Budget: $1,500,000 CAD

The Hanging Garden is a British-Canadian drama film, written and directed by Thom Fitzgerald and released in 1997. Fitzgerald's feature debut, the film was shot in Nova Scotia.

== Plot ==
The film's central character is Sweet William, as both a thin adult and a fat teenager. Its plot hinges on a fateful incident from his teenage years, when his grandmother caught him attempting to have sex with his bisexual friend Fletcher, involuntarily outing him to his dysfunctional family as gay.

As a consequence of the ensuing rejection, particularly by his alcoholic father Whiskey Mac, Sweet William faced the difficult decision of whether to run away to live in a big city far away from his family, or to commit suicide by hanging himself from a tree in the family garden. The film's themes about the duality of life and death, and the way seemingly very different choices in life can lead to similar outcomes, are portrayed through magic realism in the film's depiction of a complex merged reality in which William appears to have successfully made both choices at the same time.

The film is told as a triptych. In the first segment, set in the present, the adult Sweet William has returned home to rural Nova Scotia for the first time since leaving ten years earlier, to attend the wedding of his sister Rosemary to Fletcher. However, upon his return, he makes two unexpected discoveries: he can still see his younger selves living there and walking around the house, and he also has a new young pre-teen sister named Violet, whom he has never met because she was born after he left. The second segment, set in the past, tells the story of Sweet William's teenage years leading up to the critical decision, including his bond with Rosemary and their mother Iris's struggles to protect her children from Whiskey Mac's abuse, as well as revealing the truth of Violet's origins, before ending with Sweet William's suicide. Returning to the present, the final segment features both the living adult and dead teenage Sweet William present in the same reality – and the dead body is not just in his imagination, because the rest of his family can also see it still hanging from the tree.

According to Fitzgerald, "To every event in the film there are two interpretations. He left home and now he's back and his memory is haunting them. Or he did commit suicide when young and his homecoming is a fantasy?" He also noted that the film did contain some autobiographical elements, due to Sweet William's sexuality and his internal debate about whether to commit suicide, but clarified that the film was not meant to be understood as literally autobiographical.

== Cast ==
- Chris Leavins as adult Sweet William
  - Troy Veinotte as teenage Sweet William
- Kerry Fox as Rosemary
  - Sarah Polley as teenage Rosemary
- Joel Keller as Fletcher
- Peter MacNeill as Whiskey Mac
- Seana McKenna as Iris
- Christine Dunsworth as Violet
- Joan Orenstein as Grace
- Heather Rankin as Black-Eyed Susan
- Ashley MacIsaac as Basil, the wedding musician

== Distribution ==
The film premiered at the 1997 Toronto International Film Festival.

It subsequently screened at the 1997 Atlantic Film Festival, the 1997 Cinéfest Sudbury International Film Festival, and the 1997 Vancouver International Film Festival.

It premiered in the United States at the 1998 Sundance Film Festival, before going into wider theatrical release.

== Critical reception ==
Roger Ebert favourably reviewed the film, writing that "It may be magic realism, but isn't it also the simple truth? Don't the ghosts of our former selves attend family events right along with our current manifestations? Don't parents still sometimes relate to us as if we were children, don't siblings still carry old resentments, aren't old friends still stuck on who we used to be? And don't we sometimes resurrect old personas and dust them off for a return engagement? Aren't all of those selves stored away inside somewhere?"

For Variety, Brendan Kelly wrote that "'The Hanging Garden' is often in danger of seeming overly pretentious, but Fitzgerald wisely undercuts the formal artiness with strong, emotional storytelling. In many ways, this is a simple yarn of a son dealing with the usual family demons and, on that level, is an affecting piece of filmmaking. Beyond that, the mix of film-school formalism and down-to-earth drama makes the pic a unique offering."

In 2001, an industry poll conducted by Playback named it the 11th best Canadian film of the preceding 15 years.

== Awards ==
Award	Year	Category	Recipient	Result	Ref.
Toronto International Film Festival	1997	People's Choice Award	The Hanging Garden	Won	
Toronto International Film Festival	1997	Best Canadian Film tied with The Sweet Hereafter	The Hanging Garden	Won	
Atlantic International Film Festival	1997	Audience Award	The Hanging Garden	Won	
Atlantic International Film Festival	1997	Best Canadian Film	The Hanging Garden	Won	
Atlantic International Film Festival	1997	Best Atlantic Film	The Hanging Garden	Won	
Atlantic International Film Festival	1997	Best Direction	Thom Fitzgerald	Won	
Atlantic International Film Festival	1997	Best Screenplay	Thom Fitzgerald	Won	
Atlantic International Film Festival	1997	Best Actor	Troy Veinotte	Won	
Atlantic International Film Festival	1997	Best Actress	Joan Orenstein	Won	
Cinéfest Sudbury International Film Festival	1997	Best Canadian Film	The Hanging Garden	Won	
Vancouver International Film Festival	1997	Best Canadian Film	The Hanging Garden	Won	
Genie Awards	1997	Best Picture	Thom Fitzgerald, Louise Garfield, Arnie Gelbart	Nominated	
Genie Awards	1997	Best Director	Thom Fitzgerald	Nominated	
Genie Awards	1997	Best Supporting Actor	Peter MacNeill	Won	
Genie Awards	1997	Best Supporting Actress	Seana McKenna	Won	
Genie Awards	1997	Best Supporting Actress	Kerry Fox	Nominated	
Genie Awards	1997	Best Supporting Actress	Joan Orenstein	Nominated	
Genie Awards	1997	Best Screenplay	Thom Fitzgerald	Won	
Genie Awards	1997	Best Art Direction/Production Design	Taavo Soodor, Darlene Shiels	Nominated	
Genie Awards	1997	Best Costume Design	James A. Worthen	Nominated	
Genie Awards	1997	Best Editing	Susan Shanks	Nominated	
Genie Awards	1997	Best Overall Sound	Peter Harper, Phillipe Espantoso, George Hannan	Nominated	
Genie Awards	1997	Claude Jutra Award	Thom Fitzgerald	Won	
Toronto Film Critics Association	1997	Best Canadian Film	The Hanging Garden	Nominated	
GLAAD Media Award	1999	Outstanding Film - Limited Release	The Hanging Garden	Nominated	

== Soundtrack ==
A soundtrack album was released in 1997 on Virgin Music Canada.

1. Ani DiFranco, "The Million You Never Made"
2. Ashley MacIsaac, "Ashley's Reels"
3. Mae Moore, "Deep Water"
4. Spirit of the West, "Kiss and Tell"
5. Jane Siberry, "When Spring Comes"
6. Holly Cole, "Petals in a Stream"
7. The Rankin Family, "Sir James Baird"
8. Meryn Cadell and Mary Margaret O'Hara, "Wash Down"
9. Mary Jane Lamond, "Ba Ba Mo Leanabh"
10. Lori Yates, "The Future is Here"
11. Deb Montgomery, "The Tale"
12. Aether, "Half Light"
13. Laurel MacDonald, "Oran na h'eala"
14. John Roby, "Theme from The Hanging Garden"
15. Leahy, "Colm Quigley"
16. Wyrd Sisters, "If it Ain't Here"
