= Louise Garfield =

Louise Garfield is a Canadian performance artist, choreographer, film and television producer and arts administrator. Her work as a producer includes the films Zero Patience in which she has a cameo role playing a virus, and The Hanging Garden, for which she received a Genie Award nomination for Best Motion Picture. She began her career in the arts as a choreographer and as a member of the feminist performance art trio The Clichettes. She later served as executive director of Arts Etobicoke in Toronto from 2004 to 2018.
