= List of LGBTQ-related films of 1991 =

1991 film

This is a list of lesbian, gay, bisexual, transgender or queer-related films released in 1991. It contains theatrically released films that deal with important gay, lesbian, bisexual, transgender or queer characters or issues and may have same-sex romance or relationships as a plot device.

== Films ==
| Title | Director | Country | Genre | Cast | Notes |
|---|---|---|---|---|---|
| Absolutely Positive | Peter Adair | United States | Documentary | | How 11 interviewed HIV positive people live with different stages of the disease and how they are coping with their illnesses in different ways. |
| The Adjuster | Atom Egoyan | Canada | Drama | Elias Koteas, Arsinée Khanjian, Maury Chaykin, Gabrielle Rose, Jennifer Dale, David Hemblen, Rose Sarkisyan, Armen Kokorian, Jacqueline Samuda, Gerard Parkes, Patricia Collins, Don McKellar, John Gilbert, Stephen Ouimette and Raoul Trujillo | |
| Anything for Bread | Enrique Urbizu | Spain | Thriller | María Barranco, Kiti Manver, Antonio Resines, Pepo Oliva, José Amezola, Luis Ciges, Caco Senante, Maite Blasco, Klara Badiola, Pedro Díez del Corral, Pilar Bardem, Ramón Barea and Ramón Goyanes | a.k.a. Todo por la pasta |
| Daddy and the Muscle Academy | Ilppo Pohjola | Finland | Documentary | | Subtitled "The Life and Art of Tom of Finland". |
| Edward II | Derek Jarman | United Kingdom | History, drama | Steven Waddington, Tilda Swinton, Andrew Tiernan, Nigel Terry, John Lynch, Dudley Sutton, Jerome Flynn, Jody Graber and Annie Lennox | Based on the play of the same name by Christopher Marlowe |
| Frankie and Johnny | Garry Marshall | United States | Comedy, drama | Al Pacino, Michelle Pfeiffer, Héctor Elizondo, Nathan Lane; | |
| Fried Green Tomatoes | Jon Avnet | United States | Comedy, drama | Kathy Bates, Mary Stuart Masterson, Nancy Moore Atchison, Mary-Louise Parker, Jessica Tandy, Cicely Tyson, Chris O'Donnell, Stan Shaw, Gailard Sartain, Timothy Scott, Gary Basaraba, Lois Smith, Danny Nelson, Jo Harvey Allen, Macon McCalman, Richard Riehle, Raynor Scheine, Grace Zabriskie, Reid Binion, Nick Searcy and Constance Shulman | Co-written by Fannie Flagg, based on her novel Fried Green Tomatoes at the Whistle Stop Cafe; lesbian subtext |
| High Heels | Pedro Almodóvar | Spain; France | Comedy, drama, romance | Victoria Abril, Marisa Paredes, Miguel Bosé, Féodor Atkine, Miriam Díaz Aroca, Anna Lizaran, Bibiana Fernández, Cristina Marcos, Pedro Diez del Corral, Mayrata O'Wisiedo, Nacho Martínez, Rocío Muñoz and Javier Bardem | a.k.a. Tacones lejanos |
| The Hours and Times | Christopher Münch | United States | Drama | David Angus, Ian Hart, Stephanie Pack, Robin McDonald, Sergio Moreno and Unity Grimwood | Fictionalized account of what might have happened during a holiday taken by John Lennon and the Beatles' manager Brian Epstein in 1963 |
| Khush | Pratibha Parmar | United Kingdom | Documentary | | |
| Letters of Transit (Les Sauf-conduits) | Manon Briand | Canada | Short drama | Julie Lavergne, Patrick Goyette, Luc Picard | |
| The Lost Language of Cranes | Nigel Finch | United Kingdom | Drama | Brian Cox, Angus Macfadyen, Eileen Atkins, Corey Parker, Richard Warwick, Cathy Tyson, René Auberjonois, John Schlesinger, Ben Daniels and Nigel Whitmey | Based on the novel of the same name by David Leavitt |
| Madonna: Truth or Dare | Alek Keshishian | United States | Documentary | Madonna | Chronicles the entertainer's life during her Blond Ambition World Tour the previous year |
| The Making of Monsters | John Greyson | Canada | Musical comedy-drama | Christopher Anderson, Stewart Arnott and Lee MacDougall | |
| Meeting Two Queens | Cecilia Barriga | Chile | Romance | Various film scenes of Greta Garbo and Marlene Dietrich | Re-editing and cutting various scenes from Hollywood films, in order to create a space for lesbian identity politics and identity formation. |
| My Father Is Coming | Monika Treut | Germany | Comedy, romance | Alfred Edel, Shelley Kästner, Annie Sprinkle, Michael Massee, Mary Lou Grailau, David Bronstein, Dominique Gaspar, Flora Gasper, Fakir Musafar, Israel Marti, Mario de Colombia, Bruce Benderson, Rebecca Lewin, Stephen Feld and Charles-John Austen | |
| My Own Private Idaho | Gus Van Sant | United States | Drama | River Phoenix, Keanu Reeves, James Russo, William Richert, Rodney Harvey, Chiara Caselli, Michael Parker, Jessie Thomas, Grace Zabriskie, Flea, Udo Kier, Vana O'Brien, Jim Caviezel, Brian Wilson and Wade Evans | Loosely based on the history plays Henry IV, Part 1, Henry IV, Part 2 and Henry V by William Shakespeare |
| Naked Lunch | David Cronenberg | Canada; United Kingdom; Japan | Fantasy, crime, drama | Peter Weller, Judy Davis, Ian Holm, Roy Scheider, Joseph Scorsiani, Julian Sands, Monique Mercure, Michael Zelniker, Nicholas Campbell, Robert A. Silverman, John Friesen and Sean McCann | Based on the novel of the same name by William S. Burroughs |
| Nelligan | Robert Favreau | Canada | Drama | Marc Saint-Pierre, Luc Morissette, Lorraine Pintal | Biopic of Émile Nelligan |
| No Skin Off My Ass | Bruce La Bruce | Canada | Comedy, drama | Bruce LaBruce, G. B. Jones, Klaus von Brücker, Caroline Azar, Beverly Breckenridge, Laurel Pervis, Kate Ashley and Jena von Brücker | |
| North of Vortex | Constantine Giannaris | United Kingdom; Greece | Drama | Stavros Zalmas, Valda Z. Drabla, Howard Napper and Kevin Graal (voice only) | |
| Our Sons | John Erman | United States | Drama | Ann-Margret, Julie Andrews, Hugh Grant, Zeljko Ivanek, Tony Roberts, Hal England, Loyda Ramos, Annabelle Weenick, Lisa Blake Richards, Essex Smith, Frank Whiteman, Elizabeth Austin and George Whiteman | Inspired by the 1987 documentary Too Little, Too Late by Micki Dickoff |
| Poison | Todd Haynes | United States | Drama | Scott Renderer, James Lyons, Edith Meeks, Millie White, Buck Smith, Rob LaBelle, John Leguizamo (Credited as Damien Garcia), Anne Giotta, Lydia Lafleur, Ian Nemser, Evan Dunsky, Susan Gayle Norman, Marina Lutz, Barry Cassidy, Richard Anthony, Angela M. Schreiber, Justin Silverstein, Chris Singh, Edward Allen and Larry Maxwell | Winner of the Teddy Award for best feature film at the 41st Berlin International Film Festival. |
| Relax | Chris Newby | United Kingdom | Short | Philip Rosch, Timothy Keen, Grant Oatley and Joe Searby | It won the Teddy Award in 1991 for Best Short. |
| RSVP | Laurie Lynd | Canada | Short | Stewart Arnott, Ferne Downey, Gordon Jocelyn, London Juno, Daniel MacIvor, Ross Manson and Judith Orban | |
| Salmonberries | Percy Adlon | Germany | Drama | Oscar Kawagley, Rosel Zech, k.d. lang, Eugene Omiak, Wayne Waterman, Jane Lind, Chuck Connors, Alvira H. Downey, Wolfgang Steinberg, Christel Merian, George Barril and Gary Albers | |
| The Silence of the Lambs | Jonathan Demme | United States | Horror, crime | Jodie Foster, Masha Skorobogatov, Anthony Hopkins, Scott Glenn, Ted Levine, Anthony Heald, Brooke Smith, Diane Baker, Kasi Lemmons, Frankie Faison, Tracey Walter, Charles Napier, Danny Darst, Alex Coleman, Dan Butler, Paul Lazar, Ron Vawter, Roger Corman, Chris Isaak and Harry Northup | Based on the novel of the same name by Thomas Harris; Villain is derogatory depiction of transgender woman |
| Soapdish | Michael Hoffman | United States | Comedy | Sally Field, Kevin Kline, Robert Downey Jr., Cathy Moriarty, Whoopi Goldberg and Elisabeth Shue | |
| Vegas in Space | Phillip R. Ford | United States | Science fiction, comedy | Doris Fish, Tippi, Miss X | |
| Voices from the Front | Robyn Hutt, Sandra Elgear, David Meieran | United States | Documentary | Larry Kramer, Vito Russo, Peter Staley | |
| Walking a Tightrope | Nikos Papatakis | France | Drama | Michel Piccoli, Lilah Dadi, Polly Walker | |
| Young Soul Rebels | Isaac Julien | United Kingdom; France; Germany; Spain | Drama | Valentine Nonyela, Mo Sesay, Dorian Healy, Frances Barber, Sophie Okonedo, Jason Durr, Gary McDonald, Debra Gillett, Eamonn Walker (credited as Eamon Walker), James Bowers, Billy Braham, Wayne Norman, Danielle Scillitoe, Ray Shell and Nigel Harrison | |
