= All Women Are Bitches =

Single by Fifth Column

from the album 36-C
- B-side: "Donna"
- Released: 1992
- Length: 2:48
- Label: K Records
- Songwriter(s): Caroline Azar, G.B. Jones (lyrics); Fifth Column (music)
- Producer(s): Walter Sobczak, Fifth Column

Fifth Column singles chronology
"Boy, Girl" (1983)	"All Women Are Bitches" (1992)	"Don't" (1993)

"All Women Are Bitches" is a single by the Toronto band Fifth Column.

The lyrics were written by Caroline Azar and G.B. Jones and the music was composed by Fifth Column. It was produced by Walter Sobczak at Wellesley Sound Studios in Toronto, Ontario, Canada.

The song first appeared as a single released by K Records in 1992. It was the 33rd single in the K Records International Pop Underground series. It was reviewed in the UK music publication Melody Maker by Everett True and voted 'Single of the Week'. The song was also on the Fifth Column album 36-C, released by K Records in 1994. It was also included on the 1993 K Records compilation, International Hip Swing.

"All Women Are Bitches" was covered and re-imagined by Lesbians on Ecstasy as "Bitchsy" in 2004, appearing on their self-titled debut album. In 2005, "Bitchsy" was featured in the TV series Queer as Folk. "Bitchsy" and "All Women Are Bitches" were remixed and sampled together by Kids on TV in 2005, and appeared on the Lesbians on Ecstasy remix album, Giggles in the Dark.

== Personnel ==
- Caroline Azar - vocals
- Beverly Breckenridge - bass
- G.B. Jones - guitar
- Chaz Salmon - guitar
- Joel Wasson - drums
- Caroline Azar, Beverly Breckenridge, Jena von Brücker, G.B. Jones - background vocals
