= 36C =

Studio album by Fifth Column
- Released: May 10, 1994
- Genre: Post-punk
- Label: K Records

Fifth Column chronology
All Time Queen of the World (1991)	36C (1994)

Professional ratings
Review scores
Source	Rating
AllMusic	2.5/5 stars

36C is the third studio album by the Canadian post-punk band Fifth Column, released in 1994 by K Records. The album cover features a photo of Jena von Brücker in a scene from the film The Yo-Yo Gang. The song "All Women Are Bitches" has been covered and sampled by Lesbians on Ecstasy as "Bitschy" in 2004 and by Kids on TV in 2005.

A video for the song "Donna" was released the same year, directed by Friday Myers, and featuring members Caroline Azar, Beverly Breckenridge, and G.B. Jones, with guitarist Michelle Breslin and photographer Jena von Brucker in supporting roles.

== Track listing ==
All tracks are written by Fifth Column

No.	Title	Length
1.	"All Women Are Bitches"	2:48
2.	"(Get the) Bug"	2:38
3.	"Your Love Glows in the Dark"	3:50
4.	"Don't"	1:58
5.	"Spoiler"	1:52
6.	"Donna"	3:08
7.	"M.O.V.E."	3:40
8.	"Von Brűcker in Love"	3:12
9.	"Schizocrush"	3:20
10.	"It's A Really Weird Thing"	2:55

== Personnel ==
- Caroline Azar – vocals, keyboards
- Beverly Breckenridge – bass, background vocals
- Michelle Breslin – guitar, background vocals
- Jena von Brücker – photography, background vocal
- Torry Colichio – drums
- Donna Dresch – guitar
- G. B. Jones – guitar, drums, background vocals
- Don Pyle – drums
- Charles Salmon – guitar
- Joel Wasson – drums
