= 2016 Polaris Music Prize =

Annual Canadian music award ceremony

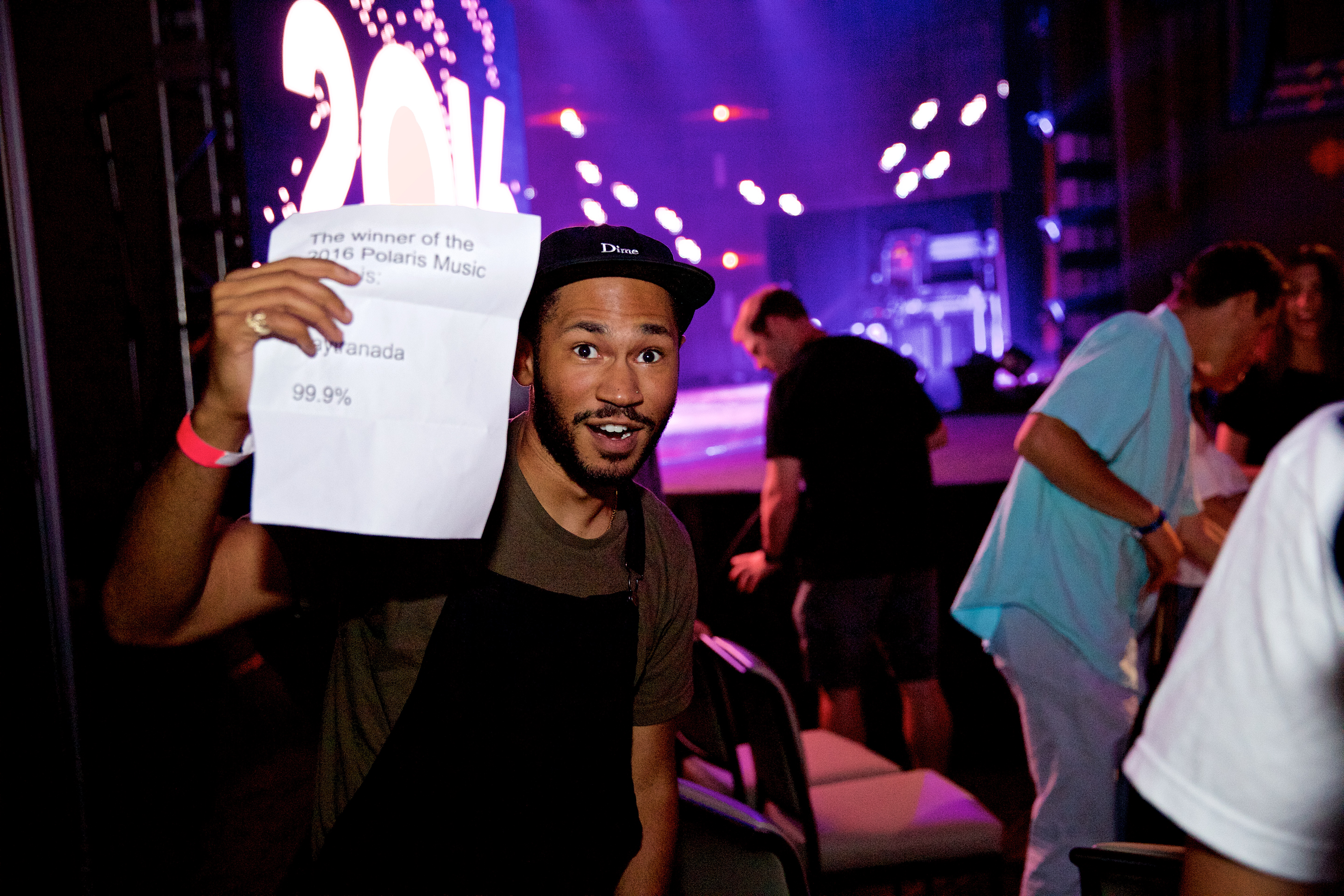
Kaytranada showing he won the 2016 Polaris Music Prize

The 2016 edition of the Canadian Polaris Music Prize was presented on September 19, 2016 at The Carlu event theatre in Toronto, Ontario. The hosts of the gala were broadcasters Tom Power and Amanda Parris.

== Shortlist ==
The ten-album shortlist was announced on July 14.

- Kaytranada, 99.9%
- Black Mountain, IV
- Basia Bulat, Good Advice
- Grimes, Art Angels
- Carly Rae Jepsen, E•MO•TION
- Jessy Lanza, Oh No
- PUP, The Dream Is Over
- Andy Shauf, The Party
- U.S. Girls, Half Free
- White Lung, Paradise

== Longlist ==
The prize's preliminary 40-album longlist was announced on June 15 at the Yukon Transportation Museum in Whitehorse, Yukon. It includes the 10 shortlisted albums above, as well as the following 30.

- Art Bergmann, The Apostate
- Justin Bieber, Purpose
- Jean-Michel Blais, II
- Daniel Caesar, Pilgrim's Paradise
- Tanika Charles, Soul Run
- City and Colour, If I Should Go Before You
- Cœur de pirate, Roses
- Dead Obies, Gesamtkunstwerk
- Destroyer, Poison Season
- Dilly Dally, Sore
- Drake, Views
- Essaie pas, Demain est une autre nuit
- Fred Fortin, Ultramarr
- Foxtrott, A Taller Us
- Half Moon Run, Sun Leads Me On
- Veda Hille, Love Waves
- Jazz Cartier, Hotel Paranoia
- Junior Boys, Big Black Coat
- Majid Jordan, Majid Jordan
- Michelle McAdorey, Into Her Future
- Nap Eyes, Thought Rock Fish Scale
- Safia Nolin, Limoilou
- Operators, Blue Wave
- Peaches, Rub
- Daniel Romano, Mosey
- The Strumbellas, Hope
- Suuns, Hold/Still
- Un Blonde, Good Will Come to You
- The Weeknd, Beauty Behind the Madness
- Donovan Woods, Hard Settle, Ain't Troubled

In August 2016, for the first time in the history of the awards the Polaris committee released the full list of all 232 albums that had received at least one vote in the preliminary balloting.

== Heritage Prize ==
Nominees for the Polaris Heritage Prize, a separate award to honour classic Canadian albums released before the creation of the Polaris Prize, were announced at the main Polaris gala. The shortlists for the Heritage Prize were increased to ten nominees, from five in 2015, and two winners were named: one selected by the jurors and one selected by an audience vote. The winners were announced on October 24.

=== 1960–1975 ===
- Public: Neil Young, After the Gold Rush
- Jury: Leonard Cohen, Songs of Leonard Cohen
- The Band, Music from Big Pink
- The Band, The Band
- Robert Charlebois and Louise Forestier, Lindberg
- Gordon Lightfoot, Lightfoot!
- Joni Mitchell, Court and Spark
- The Oscar Peterson Trio, Night Train
- Jackie Shane, Jackie Shane Live
- Neil Young, Everybody Knows This Is Nowhere

=== 1976–1985 ===
- Public: Rush, Moving Pictures
- Jury: Kate & Anna McGarrigle, Kate & Anna McGarrigle
- Bruce Cockburn, Stealing Fire
- D.O.A., Hardcore '81
- Fifth Column, To Sir With Hate
- Glenn Gould, Bach: The Goldberg Variations
- Martha and the Muffins, This Is the Ice Age
- Jackie Mittoo, Showcase Volume 3
- Rough Trade, Avoid Freud
- Leroy Sibbles, On Top

=== 1986–1995 ===
- Public: Blue Rodeo, Five Days in July
- Jury: Mary Margaret O'Hara, Miss America
- Dream Warriors, And Now the Legacy Begins
- Maestro Fresh Wes, Symphony in Effect
- Daniel Lanois, Acadie
- Sarah McLachlan, Fumbling Towards Ecstasy
- Main Source, Breaking Atoms
- Alanis Morissette, Jagged Little Pill
- John Oswald, Plunderphonics
- The Tragically Hip, Fully Completely

=== 1996–2005 ===
- Public: Arcade Fire, Funeral
- Jury: Lhasa de Sela, La Llorona
- Bran Van 3000, Glee
- Broken Social Scene, You Forgot It in People
- Constantines, Shine a Light
- The Dears, No Cities Left
- Destroyer, Streethawk: A Seduction
- Esthero, Breath from Another
- Feist, Let It Die
- k-os, Joyful Rebellion
