= Lesbians on Ecstasy (album) =

Studio album by Lesbians on Ecstasy
- Released: October 25, 2004 (US)
- Recorded: June 2004
- Genre: Electroclash
- Length: 48:35
- Label: Alien8 Recordings

Professional ratings
Review scores
Source	Rating
AllMusic	4/5 stars
Tiny Mix Tapes	2/5 stars
Exclaim!	

Lesbians on Ecstasy is the self-titled debut album of Montreal-based electropunk group Lesbians on Ecstasy, released in 2004. It comprises reworkings of "standards from the lesbian songbooks" as reimagined electronic dance anthems.

The album contains 11 songs, including a live bonus track. The first single is the track "Tell Me Does She Love the Bass", a reworking of the 1988 Melissa Etheridge hit "Like the Way I Do". The album also contains several covers of other Canadian performers. "Pleasure Principal" is an electropunk response to Rough Trade's song "High School Confidential", "Kündstant Krøving" is a take at k.d. lang's "Constant Craving", and "Parachute Clubbing" is a take on Parachute Club's "Rise Up".

"Bitchsy", which references the Fifth Column song "All Women Are Bitches", was featured on Queer as Folk during the final season of 2005.

== Reception ==
In her 2004 review for The Advocate, Sara Marcus said "Lesbians on Ecstasy creates joyous and outlandish riffs on dyke classics", explaining that "Sultry songs become ominous and aggressive in the hands of the Lesbians". Writing in The Advocate in 2007, Kurt B. Reighley said that the album was based on a "A great idea, but the execution didn't always keep up with the ambitions".

== Track listing ==
1. "Intro" – 1:00
2. "Parachute Clubbing" – 3:30
3. "Tell Me Does She Love the Bass" – 4:52
4. "Pleasure Principal" – 5:10
5. "Kündstant Krøving" – 3:55
6. "Bitchsy" – 3:19
7. "Closer to the Dark" – 3:46
8. "Queens of Noise (Bring da Bunny)" – 4:20
9. "Revolt" – 5:25
10. "Summer Luv" – 3:12
11. "Manipulation" – 5:33
12. "Superdyke! (Live)" – 4:33
