= Avoid Freud =

Studio album by Rough Trade
- Released: October 13, 1980
- Recorded: August – September 1980
- Genres: Art punk; new wave
- Length: 34:56
- Labels: True North (Canada); Stiff America (U.S.); CBS (Netherlands)
- Producers: Gene Martynec; Rough Trade

Rough Trade chronology
Rough Trade Live! Direct to Disc (1976)	Avoid Freud (1980)	For Those Who Think Young (1981)

Professional ratings
Review scores
Source	Rating
Allmusic	3/5 stars
Rolling Stone	(Not Rated)

Avoid Freud is the second album by Canadian new wave band Rough Trade, released in 1980. It placed at least as high as #19 on the Canadian RPM Top Albums Chart on March 14, 1981. The album was certified gold in Canada (50,000 units) by the CRIA on March 1, 1981, then advanced to platinum certification (100,000 units) by June of the same year.

The first single released from the album was the controversial "What's The Furor About The Führer?" b/w "Fashion Victim" the latter track becoming the larger hit, reaching #25 in Canada on the National Top 50 Singles Chart on February 7, 1981 and #3 on the RPM CANCON Chart the following week. The album's most famous single, however, is "High School Confidential" (b/w "Grade B Movie") which was intensely controversial for its explicitly sexual lyrics, which include references to lesbianism. The influential Toronto radio station CHUM-FM paid for the band to record a cleaned-up version that avoided the line, "She makes me cream my jeans when she comes my way." It reached #1 on the RPM CANCON Chart and #12 on the National Top 50 Chart on June 20 of the same year.

== Track listing ==
All tracks are written by Carole Pope and Kevan Staples.

No.	Title	Length
1.	"It's a Jungle"	3:17
2.	"High School Confidential"	3:26
3.	"Lie Back, Let Me Do Everything"	3:22
4.	"Physical Violence"	3:55
5.	"I Can't Take It"	3:42
6.	"What's the Furor About the Führer?"	3:22
7.	"Fashion Victim"	4:06
8.	"Emotional Blackmail"	2:42
9.	"Hostage"	3:38
10.	"Grade B Movie"	3:56

== Personnel ==
- Carole Pope - lead vocals
- Kevan Staples - vocals, guitar, piano, synthesiser
- David McMorrow - vocals, piano, Rhodes, synthesisers
- Terry Wilkins - vocals, Fender fretless bass
- Bucky Berger - vocals, drums
- Gene Martynec - producer
- Gary Gray - engineer
- David Taylor - assistant engineer
- George Marino - mastering
- Peter J. Moore - remastering, restoration
- Vicki Wickham - direction
