= To Sir with Hate =

Studio album by Fifth Column
- Released: 1985
- Genre: Post-punk
- Label: Hide Records
- Producer: Michael Phillip Wojewoda

Fifth Column chronology
| To Sir with Hate (1985) | All Time Queen of the World (1990) |

To Sir with Hate is the debut album by Canadian post-punk band Fifth Column, released in 1985 on Hide Records. Considered a classic of Canadian music, it was named a shortlisted nominee in the 1976-1985 category for the 2016 Polaris Music Prize, the 2017 Polaris Music Prize, and the 2018 Polaris Music Prize.

The album was produced by Michael Phillip Wojewoda with Fifth Column.

The cover photo is by Toronto artist John Brown.

A video for the song "Where Are They Now?" was directed by Marc de Guerre and released in 1985. A video for "The Fairview Mall Story" followed in 1986, directed by Steven Rumbelow.

This album was followed by All Time Queen of the World in 1990, and 36-C in 1994.

== Critical reception ==
Liam Lacey reviewed the album favourably for The Globe and Mail in 1986, writing "Let these rude girls loose in England, and they'd be the heroines of the alternative charts in six weeks." Trouser Press wrote that "while unfailingly thought-provoking — particularly on drummer-cum-guitarist (and noted film-maker) Gloria Berlin Jones’ darker compositions — the album ultimately falls victim to overly antiseptic production that blunts its punch considerably."

== Track listing ==
All tracks are written by Fifth Column

| No. | Title | Length |
|---|---|---|
| 1. | "Kangaroo Court" | 2:14 |
| 2. | "The Fairview Mall Story" | 4:00 |
| 3. | "Hit the Roof" | 4:07 |
| 4. | "To Sir with Hate" | 6:09 |
| 5. | "Modern Diseases" | 7:31 |
| 6. | "Right Hook" | 2:58 |
| 7. | "Ghost of a Buffalo" | 5:44 |
| 8. | "Where Are They Now?" | 4:04 |
| 9. | "Late Last Night" | 4:14 |

== Personnel ==
- Caroline Azar - main vocals, keyboard, drums
- G.B. Jones - drums, keyboard, vocals
- Anita Smith - bass, vocals
- Charlotte Briede - guitar, vocals
- Kelly Ellis - trumpet on "Hit the Roof" and "Modern Diseases"
- Eric Fitz - saxophone on "Modern Diseases"
- Nic Gotham - saxophone on "Late Last Night"
- Michael Phillip Wojewoda - timbales on "Modern Diseases"
- Bruce LaBruce - background vocals on "The Fairview Mall Story" and "Hit the Roof"
- Marc de Guerre - background vocals on "Hit the Roof"
- John Porter - background vocals on "Hit the Roof"
- Kathleen R. - background vocals on "Where Are They Now?" and "Hit the Roof"
