= Antidiva: The Carole Pope Confessions =

- Directed by: Michelle Mama
- Written by: Sarah Bachinski; Allen Booth; Michelle Mama
- Produced by: Bill Taylor; Allison Grace
- Starring: Carole Pope
- Cinematography: Stephen Chung; Lulu Wei
- Edited by: Sarah Bachinski
- Music by: Ames Bessada
- Production companies: Gay Agenda; Here's the Thing Productions
- Distributed by: Motion 58 Entertainment
- Release date: April 23, 2026 (Hot Docs)
- Running time: 89 minutes
- Country: Canada
- Language: English

Antidiva: The Carole Pope Confessions is a Canadian documentary film, directed by Michelle Mama and released in 2026. The film profiles Carole Pope, the singer who became one of Canada's first out lesbian celebrities with her band Rough Trade in the 1980s.

In addition to Pope herself, figures appearing in the film to discuss her legacy include k.d. lang, Peaches, Jann Arden, Rufus Wainwright, George Stroumboulopoulos and Jeanne Beker. Peaches also signed on as an executive producer of the film.

Production of the film was first announced in 2024. In an essay for the Cutaways column on CBC Arts at the time of its premiere, Pope wrote about her experiences working with Mama on the film.

The film premiered on April 23, 2026, as the opening film of the 2026 Hot Docs Canadian International Documentary Festival. It will be broadcast on Documentary and CBC Gem later in 2026.

== Critical response ==
Pat Mullen of Point of View wrote that "Pope expresses fair words of love and pain, as well as pride and regret, throughout the film, but she doesn’t look for pity. In fact, the film’s the better for it as the rocker’s story simply doesn’t fit the hagiographic mould into which so many music docs fall. If she’s tight-lipped in parts, Pope says more about her experience in the biz by refusing to waste time looking back. She keeps hustling with the cameras seemingly determined to keep pace. Antidiva works because of, and in spite of, Carole Pope."

== Awards ==
The film won the juried award for Best Canadian Film at the 2026 Inside Out Film and Video Festival.
