= For Those Who Think Young (album) =

Studio album by Rough Trade
- Released: December 30, 1981 (U.S.)
- Recorded: June 1981 – August 1981
- Genres: Rock, new wave
- Length: 33:02
- Labels: True North Records (Canada), Boardwalk Records (U.S.), Big Time Records (U.K.), CBS Records (Netherlands)
- Producers: Gene Martynec, Kevan Staples

Rough Trade chronology
Avoid Freud (1980)	For Those Who Think Young (1981)	Shaking the Foundations (1982)

Singles from For Those Who Think Young
- 1. "All Touch" Released: 1981; 2. "Blood Lust" Released: 1981; 3. "For Those Who Think Young" Released: 1981

Professional ratings
Review scores
Source	Rating
Allmusic	4/5 stars
Rolling Stone	(Not Rated)

For Those Who Think Young, appearing on the album cover as (for those who think young) and originally to be entitled for those who think jung, is the third album by Canadian new wave band Rough Trade; it was released in 1981 (True North TN-48 in Canada; Boardwalk NB-33261-1, US; Big Time, UK; CBS 85385, The Netherlands). It climbed to #9 in Canada on the RPM Top 50 Albums Chart on November 7, 1981 (putting it at #1 on the CANCON Chart listing), and held the position for three weeks, dropping out of the Top 50 after sixteen weeks on February 6 of the following year. It was certified gold in Canada by the CRIA on November 1, 1981. The single "All Touch" gave the band its biggest commercial success, reaching #12 in Canada on the RPM Top 50 Singles Chart (#2 on the CANCON Chart) and #58 on the U.S. Billboard Hot 100.

Singles released from the album included "All Touch" (b/w "Baptism of Fire") [True North TN4-165], "Blood Lust" (b/w "Bodies In Collision") [True North TN4-170], "For Those Who Think Young" (b/w "Attitude") [True North TN4-171], all 1981 Canadian releases in picture sleeves, and the 1982 U.S. release of "All Touch" (b/w "The Sacred And The Profane") [Boardwalk NB-11-167-7].

== Track listing ==
All tracks are written by Carole Pope and Kevan Staples.

No.	Title	Length
1.	"All Touch"	3:32
2.	"Attitude"	4:03
3.	"For Those Who Think Young"	4:04
4.	"Bodies in Collision"	2:50
5.	"Prisoner of My Skin"	3:12
6.	"The Sacred & The Profane"	4:34
7.	"Baptism of Fire"	3:23
8.	"Fakin' It"	3:35
9.	"Blood Lust"	3:49

== Personnel ==
- Carole Pope – lead vocals
- Kevan Staples – vocals, guitar, piano, synthesiser, producer
- David McMorrow – vocals, piano, Rhodes, synthesisers
- Terry Wilkins – vocals, Fender fretless bass
- Bucky Berger – vocals, drums
- Gene Martynec – producer
- Gary Gray – engineer
- Rick Starks – assistant engineer
- Jack Skinner – mastering
- Peter J. Moore – remastering, restoration
- Dusty Springfield – backing vocals
- Shawne Jackson – backing vocals
- Colina Phillips – backing vocals
- Derek Taylor – make-up

== Charts ==
Chart (1982)	Peak position
Australia (Kent Music Report)	59
Canadian RPM Top Albums Chart	9
Canadian RPM CANCON Albums Chart	1

Singles

Year	Single	Chart	Position
1981	"All Touch"	Canadian RPM CANCON Singles Chart	2
1981	"All Touch"	Canadian RPM Top Singles Chart	12
1982	"All Touch"	US Billboard Hot 100 Pop Singles	58
