= Shaking the Foundations =

Studio album by Rough Trade
- Released: 1982
- Genres: New wave, synth-pop, rock
- Length: 37:18
- Label: True North
- Producers: Gene Martynec, Carole Pope, Kevan Staples

Rough Trade chronology
| For Those Who Think Young (1981) | Shaking the Foundations (1982) | Weapons (1983) |

Singles from Shaking the Foundations
- 1. "Crimes of Passion" Released: 1982

Shaking the Foundations is the fourth studio album by the Toronto new-wave band Rough Trade. It was released in 1982 and became a hit in Canada in 1983, spending 21 weeks on the charts, peaking at #9 in February, putting it at #1 on the CANCON listing.

The only standard single release from the album was "Crimes of Passion" b/w "Endless Night", which peaked at #18. Both this and the title track were included on the 10-track 1985 greatest hits album Birds of a Feather: The Best of Rough Trade. "I Want to Live" b/w "Numero Fatale" and "The Sacred and the Profane" (the last track being from the previous album For Those Who Think Young) was released as a 12-inch picture sleeve disc.

"Endless Night", inspired by the Operation Soap raids of 1981, served as the theme music to the 1982 documentary film Track Two (Enough Is Enough).

== Reception ==
Shaking the Foundations hit gold in Canada four weeks after its release (50,000 units, certified by the CRIA on March 1, 1983), and was the #68 album of the year for 1983. It won the 1983 U-Know Award for Album of the Year.

== Track list ==
All tracks are written by Carole Pope and Kevan Staples.

| No. | Title | Length |
|---|---|---|
| 1. | "Crimes of Passion" | 3:57 |
| 2. | "Endless Night" (From the film Track Two) | 4:40 |
| 3. | "Shaking the Foundations" | 3:59 |
| 4. | "Vertigo" | 3:15 |
| 5. | "Numero Fatale" | 3:38 |
| 6. | "America: Bad and Beautiful" | 3:30 |
| 7. | "I Want to Live" | 3:56 |
| 8. | "Kiss Me Deadly" | 3:48 |
| 9. | "Fire Down Below" | 3:41 |
| 10. | "Beg for It" | 2:54 |

Note that the UK release of Shaking the Foundations adds the track "All Touch" to the album, placing it at the beginning of side two (right before "America: Bad and Beautiful").

== Charts ==
| Chart (1983) | Peak position |
|---|---|
| Australia (Kent Music Report) | 96 |
| Canadian RPM Top Albums Chart | 9 |
| Canadian RPM CANCON Albums Chart | 1 |

== Personnel ==
During the recording of this album, Terry Wilkins and Bucky Berger left the band and were replaced by Howard Ayee and Jorn Anderson.

- Carole Pope - vocals
- Kevan Staples - guitar, keyboards, percussion, piano, synthesizer, vocals
- Terry Wilkins - bass
- Bucky Berger - drums
- Howard Ayee - bass
- Jorn Andersen - drums
- David McMorrow - synthesizer

Additional vocals

- Ray Borg
- Bruce Cockburn
- Scott Davey
- Nona Hendryx
- Tevan Kaplan
- Sharon Lee Williams

== Production ==
Gary Gray was nominated for the Recording Engineer of the Year Juno Award for his work on this album.

- Gene Martynec - producer
- Carole Pope - producer
- Kevan Staples - producer, art direction
- Gary Grey - engineer
- Peter Lee - assistant engineer
- Rick Starks - assistant engineer
- George Marino - mastering
- Peter J. Moore - remastering, restoration
- Bart Schoales - art direction
- Christopher Dew - photography
