= For Those Who Think Young =

For Those Who Think Young may refer to:

- For Those Who Think Young (film), a 1964 beach party film for which Pepsi was the sponsor
- For Those Who Think Young (album), 1981 album by Rough Trade
- "For Those Who Think Young" (Mad Men), the first episode of the second season of the American television show.

== See also ==
- "Now It's Pepsi for Those Who Think Young", an advertising slogan used by Pepsi from 1961 through 1964
