= Paulette Phillips =

Canadian artist based in Toronto

Paulette Phillips (born 1956) is a Canadian artist based in Toronto. She was born in Halifax, Nova Scotia. Her conceptually oriented art practice combines film and video installation, sculpture, photography and performance. Phillips is a professor at Ontario College of Art & Design University where she has taught studio practice in film, installation and performance since 1986. A graduate of York University (2008) and the Canadian Film Centre (1992), Phillips became a certified polygraph examiner after completing a course at the Maryland Institute for Criminal Justice (2009). Phillips is represented by Diaz Contemporary (Toronto) and Danielle Arnaud Contemporary Art (London).

== Art practice ==
Focussed on witnessing, looking and reflection, Phillips' work deals with the relationship between (female) subject and viewer. Consistent throughout her work is an interest in the way psychological content is embedded in the physical world, a tendency Phillips strives to make visible via the depiction of contradictions. The artist has stated "I am interested in paradox and conflict, unease, humour and contradiction." An explicit aim of Phillips' work is to in some way destabilize the viewer. In his essay, The Secret Life of Criminals, Gordon Hatt writes: "Phillips invites us into scenarios…that penetrate our contentment and direct us to recall the source of our own compulsive narratives and…anxieties." In the videowork, It's About How People Judge Appearance (2000) a well-dressed women violently bangs her head against a brick wall, walks away and then does it again. The video projection The Floating House (2002) in the collection of the National Gallery of Canada features a half-scale Gothic revival house sinking in deep water off the coast of Nova Scotia. The film projection Crosstalk (2004), which was exhibited at The Power Plant, Toronto in 2006 as part of the exhibition "We can do this now" and is in the collection of Frac Normandie on-lookers encircle and stare at the gallery viewer positioned in place of an implied off-screen traumatic event. As part of an extensive art work begun in 2009 Phillips has been conducting lie testing with the denizens or the art world in London, Paris, Dublin, Montreal, Vancouver, Toronto and Banff. Using her training as a certified polygraph examiner Phillips' polygraph's responses to a series of question about honesty, probing the limits of portraiture's territory to trap, capture, probe, witness and archive.

In a number of works, Phillips investigates the cultural significance of architectural monuments. Commissioned for Toronto's Nuit Blanche, As Could Be (2009) projects onto smoke a 3D video animation of Tatlin's Monument to the Third International accompanied by a soundtrack made of diverse people talking about work and its meaning today. In Touché (2008), Phillips traps two magnetized books in an 'embrace' in a metal cage. "One book hovers over the other repelled by its negative energy field." The books are Le Corbusier's The Poetics of Metaphor and Caroline Constance's Eileen Gray. In this way, Phillips dramatizes discord in the designer and the architect's relationship. Shell (2008) a half-hour film about the derelict house E.1027 built by Gray in 1927 in Cap Martin, France, suggests "an association between domestic architecture and the uncanny."

Phillips was commissioned by Fashion Week London to make Marnie's Handbag (2008), a 10-minute video about film noir fashion that premiered at the Tate Modern. In 2008, the Tatton Park Biennale commissioned Phillips to make an installation titled The Walking Ferns, which consisted of a herd of robotic ferns walking in the Victorian Rose Garden. In 2003, the Images Festival awarded Phillips the Marian McMahon Award for her curatorial project Do The Wrong Thing, featuring the work of Eija-Liisa Ahtila, Miranda July, Aïda Ruilova and Rita Myers among others.

== Early history ==
As an artist working in film, video and performance in the 1980s, Phillips and Geoffrey Shea directed the video Work (1989), which features a soundtrack by Fifth Column and American writer Paul Bowles. In 1984, Phillips founded United Media Arts Studies with Geoffrey Shea, Christian Morrison, Ed Lam and Dimitrije Martinovic. UMAS published the first video essay VHS magazine called Diderot. The film Lockjaw (1992), a deconstruction of psychoanalytic theory, is available in university libraries across Canada. In the 1990s Phillips worked in theatre writing and directing the experimental performance installations Under the Influence at the Factory Theatre Lab (1992) and Controlling Interest (1995) at the Theatre Passe Muraille. Phillips shared a Dora Mavor Moore Award for Best Female Performance with Tracy Wright, Nadia Ross, Ali Riley, Valerie Buhagiar, Caroline Gillis and Maria Vacratsis for their work in the Lorca Play, directed by Daniel MacIvor and Daniel Brooks for the Festival of the Americas.

== Selected publications ==
- Les Lendermains d'hier, Lesley Johnstone, Musee d'art contemporain de Montreal(2010) ISBN 978-2-551-23939-9
- Practical Dreamers, Conversations with Movie Artists (2007) ISBN 978-1-55245-200-4
- Explorations Narratives (2007) ISBN 978-2-9808020-1-0
- Catalogue de l'exposition Lisa Klapstock Paulette Phillips (2007) ISBN 978-1-896940-44-1
- Repatriating the Ark (2006) ISBN 0-9547617-5-8
- Rezonancia-Resonance Electromagnetic Bodies (2005) ISBN 88-7336-179-X
- Caught in the Act: An anthology of performance art (2004) ISBN 978-0-920397-84-8
- Paulette Phillips, The Secret Life of Criminals: Clues and Curiosities (2004) ISBN 0-9547617-0-7
