= High School Confidential (Rough Trade song) =

Single by Rough Trade

from the album Avoid Freud
- B-side: "Grade B Movie"
- Released: 1980
- Length: 3:26
- Label: True North TN4-159
- Songwriters: Carole Pope; Kevan Staples
- Producer: Gene Martynec

Rough Trade singles chronology
"What's the Furor about the Führer?" (1980)	"High School Confidential" (1980)	"All Touch" (1981)

"High School Confidential" is a song by Canadian new wave band Rough Trade, from their 1980 album Avoid Freud. The band's breakthrough Top 40 hit in Canada, it remains their most famous song.

The song's producer was Gene Martynec, who won the Juno Award for Producer of the Year for his work on "High School Confidential" and Bruce Cockburn's "Tokyo". It was written by the band's main songwriting team, Carole Pope and Kevan Staples. Some references incorrectly credit Jerry Lee Lewis and Ron Hargrave as the songwriters, but the Rough Trade song is not a cover of the Jerry Lee Lewis song of the same name.

Although the song uses the title of the 1958 film High School Confidential, as well as references which suggest that the song is set in a similar time frame, the lyrics do not strongly resemble the film's drug-related plot. Instead, the song's narrator is a student observing a sexy female classmate, a "cool blonde scheming bitch" whose activities suggest that she may be having sexual relations with adult men, including the high school principal. The narrator compares the classmate to 1950s sex symbols Mamie Van Doren, Anita Ekberg and Dagmar, and reveals her own unrequited lust for her: in one of the most famous lyrics from the song, Pope sings "She makes me cream my jeans when she comes my way".

The lyrics never explicitly state the narrator's own sex, so they may be read either as Pope speaking from a male perspective, or as a reference to lesbianism. In a 2000 interview with Eye Weekly, Pope confirmed that while she intended the lyric from her own perspective as a lesbian, the ambiguity was intentional: "The general public didn't get that I was gay – if you were gay you did – and when I wrote love songs, I wanted them to be interpreted however. The thing is, I really, really love men – straight men are very sexy as long as, you know, they don't try – and I think that comes across in my songs. Rock 'n' roll is about desire and passion, and I'm singing to both sexes."

== Popular impact ==
At the time of its release, it was one of the most sexually explicit songs ever to reach the Canadian pop charts, and despite the sexual ambiguity, the first with such strong lesbian overtones.

Although controversial, the song was a Top 20 hit, peaking at No. 12 nationwide on the RPM singles chart (#1 on their CANCON Chart) on June 20, 1981 and at No. 8 on the CHUM Chart in Toronto on May 30 of the same year. However, some radio stations refused to play the song, and others played a censored version with some of the most controversial lyrics removed; CHUM-FM paid for the band to record a cleaned-up version that avoided the line, "She makes me cream my jeans when she comes my way." (The band's subsequent hit "Crimes of Passion", which included an explicit verse about a gay male couple, also faced similar controversy.)

k.d. lang was apparently inspired by seeing the band perform the number on the televised Juno Awards presentation that year, "seeing [Carole] set a tone for me that I could be out, no question". Merrill Nisker (now known by her stage name "Peaches") covered the song on her 1995 album Fancypants Hoodlum.

The song appeared in the 1991 Canadian film The Adjuster, directed by Atom Egoyan.

In 1999, the German band Alphaville covered "High School Confidential" on their album Dreamscapes. In 2004, the band Lesbians on Ecstasy released "The Pleasure Principal", a response song in which the high school's principal calls Pope to the office to discuss Pope's obsession with her classmate.

In 2005, "High School Confidential" was named the 38th greatest Canadian song of all time on the CBC Radio One series 50 Tracks: The Canadian Version.

The 2020 film Jump, Darling features lead character Russell, an aspiring drag queen, performing a lip synch to "High School Confidential" in his local gay bar. In 2022, the song was used as a Lip Sync for Your Life number in the third season of Canada's Drag Race, in an episode in which Pope appeared as a guest judge.

== Queer as Folk ==
In 2000, Pope recorded a new version of "High School Confidential" for the television series Queer as Folk, with the lyrics altered to reflect a gay male perspective: "He's a cool blond scheming trick...He's a combination Tom Cruise-Zack O'Toole". (Zack O'Toole was a fictional porn star in QAF, played by Matthew G. Taylor.) This version appears on the show's first season soundtrack album.
