= Lorelei (band) =

American band

- Origin: Pittsburgh
- Genre: Dark Rock
- Years active: 2000–present
- Label: Ice-Made Records
- Members: Susannah Bailis; Dan Barone; Thad Kellstadt

Lorelei is a dark rock band formed in Pittsburgh in 2000 by Dan Barone and Susannah Bailis.

== History ==
Lorelei started with an ensemble of only two bassists. Drummer Thad Kellstadt joined in 2001, and by June the trio recorded their debut EP, My Assassin, which was good enough for the Kill Rock Stars compilation album Fields and Streams. They released their first full album, Our Minds Have Been Electrified on Ice-Made Records in late 2002.

== Discography ==
Our Minds Have Been Electrified (Ice-Made, 2002)
1. Joan Jett
2. Rider
3. Ambush
4. Not Yet
5. As Long as It's Pink
6. Sirens
7. Red Boots
8. Crusader Style
9. Guitar Eternal
10. Switch
