= Phono-Comb =

Canadian musical group

- Also known as: Jad Fair & Phono-Comb
- Origin: Toronto, Ontario, Canada
- Genres: Surf rock, instrumental rock
- Years active: 1993–1999
- Labels: Touch & Go, Quarterstick, Shake the Record
- Past members: Don Pyle; Dallas Good; Reid Diamond; Beverly Breckenridge; Jad Fair

Phono-Comb was a Canadian instrumental/modern surf rock group that formed in 1993 in Toronto.

== History ==
Phono-Comb first materialized when Shadowy Men on a Shadowy Planet played with Jad Fair when he was performing in Toronto to promote a film about his band Half Japanese. Shadowy Men were planning a hiatus around this time, and guitarist Brian Connelly opted out of the planned follow-up recording project (although he is credited as a co-songwriter on all the songs). Don Pyle and Reid Diamond invited Dallas Good of The Sadies to step in, and 'Jad Fair & Phono-Comb' was born. They recorded a single in 1995 and a full-length album, Monsters, Lullabies...and the Occasional Flying Saucer in 1996. After this recording, Fair returned to his solo career, and the remaining trio recorded an instrumental single. In 1996, they added Beverly Breckenridge (of Fifth Column) on bass, and Reid Diamond switched over to guitar. As a quartet, they recorded a CD, Fresh Gasoline with Steve Albini producing. The band toured throughout North America and one of their songs was featured on the soundtrack of the documentary film Pitch. Reid Diamond died of cancer in February 2001. Dallas Good died from a heart condition in February 2022.

== Members ==
Jad Fair & Phono-Comb:

- Jad Fair - vocals
- Dallas Good - guitar, also with The Sadies
- Don Pyle - drums, formerly with Shadowy Men on a Shadowy Planet
- Reid Diamond - bass, formerly with Shadowy Men on a Shadowy Planet

Phono-Comb:

- Dallas Good - guitar
- Don Pyle - drums
- Reid Diamond - bass, switching to guitar when Beverly Breckenridge joined the band.
- Beverly Breckenridge - bass, formerly with Fifth Column

== Discography ==
Jad Fair & Phono-Comb:

- 1995 In A Haunted House 7" Derivative Records
- 1996 Monsters, Lullabies...and the Occasional Flying Saucer, CD, Shake the Record

Phono-Comb:

- 1996 The Crass And The Switchblade 7" Touch & Go/Quarterstick
- 1996 Fresh Gasoline, Touch & Go/Quarterstick
