= Fifth Column (band) =

Canadian post-punk band

- Origin: Toronto, Ontario, Canada
- Genres: Punk rock; post-punk; riot grrrl
- Years active: 1981–2002
- Label: K
- Members: G. B. Jones; Caroline Azar; Beverly Breckenridge
- Past members: Charlotte Briedé; Anita Smith; Janet Martin; Kathleen Robertson; Michelle Breslin; Donna Dresch; Torry Colichio; Don Pyle; Joel Wasson; Charlie Salmon; Anne McLean

Fifth Column was a Canadian all-female post-punk band from Toronto, which formed in 1980 and broke up in 1995.

== History ==
The band began as a trio named Second Unit, with GB Jones on drums, Kathleen Pirrie Adams on bass, and Janet Martin on guitar. Caroline Azar saw this group play in the fall of 1980, and shortly after successfully auditioned as singer, and this lineup played their first gig as Fifth Column in late 1980.

The band took the name Fifth Column from their interpretation of an alleged military manoeuvre by fascist Francisco Franco during the Spanish Civil War, in which Nazi-aligned nationalist insurrectionists within besieged Republican Madrid, called the Fifth column, aided the four columns (north, south, east and west) outside the city's perimeters.

Soon after forming, the group became involved in the Cassette culture of the 1980s. Their first release was a selection of songs on the cassette compilation Urban Scorch released by Some Product in 1981. GB Jones, Caroline Azar and Candy Parker released an underground xerox art/social commentary zine named Hide, of which they published five issues. After its first issue, they came out with audio cassettes that were compilations of music by their punk, post-punk and experimental contemporaries, like Anti-Scrunti Faction, The Dave Howard Singers, Mydolls, The Party's Over, Really Red, Rongwrong, and Michael Phillip Wojewoda, as well as Fifth Column. Mainstream local media/middle-of-the-road maligners of the group, were a mix of music reporters/columnists who were both female and male, uncomfortable with the sound and performance, not considered palatable at the time. The trend behind the attacks were based on the band's approach to their genderific sketch of themselves as Second Wave feminists, disrupting populist ideas of being, songwriting, language and image. The commercial and careerist alternative scenes made of hetero-normative and gay assimilationists were also most threatened. The few Canadians in the media championing were: Radio Hosts/Journalists; CKLN's Denise Benson, The Eye's Chris O'Connor, The Sun's John Sakamoto, The Globe and Mail's Liam Lacey, CBC Brave New Wave's hosts Brent Banbury and Kevin Komoda. The Fifth Column sound forged on Vinyl, would not be, without the deftness of Producers/Engineers: Peter D. Hudson (Dundrells), Walter Sobczak (Sturm Group), MP Wojewoda and the elusive Jack Freimanis. The aforementioned actualized the sound that Jones and Azar were aiming for. There were no female producers available or interested at that innate time in Toronto history and culture. There were many girls close to the group who were inspiring friends/muses, and many of them appeared in the music video "Donna", like Jena Von Brucker, Mic Hell, Norma Jean LeFebvre and Ottilie Mason.

Their first vinyl release was the 7" Boy-Girl EP produced in 1983 by Voicepondence Records.

The name of their first full-length recording To Sir With Hate was a play on the theme song from the British school film, To Sir With Love, performed by Lulu. Produced by Michael Phillip Wojewoda, it is now considered a classic of Canadian music; at the 2016 Polaris Music Prize it was named a shortlisted nominee in the 1976-1985 category for the 2016 Polaris Music Prize, the 2017 Polaris Music Prize, and the 2018 Polaris Music Prize.

A song from this LP, "The Fairview Mall Story" was based on true events concerning media publication of the names of men arrested after being entrapped by police and was instrumental in paving the way for the emergence of the queercore scene. Their video for the song, directed by indie feature film director Steven Rumbelow, involved 50's images of men cruising in their new cars, shopping malls, and car crashes, was intercut with the band and go-go dancer Bruce La Bruce. A video for the song "Where Are they Now?" was also made, directed by Marc de Guerre.

Their live shows often included films played overtop of the band and a 'go-go' boy dancing. They were frequently accompanied by guest musicians who played instruments as varied as saxophone, trumpet, flute, or violin.

Independent-minded, they released their recordings, including their second full-length recording All-Time Queen Of The World, themselves. A video for the song "Like This" from the album was directed by Bruce LaBruce with the band. The band also appeared on a number of compilations.

In 1992, they released a single, "All Women Are Bitches", on the independent record label K Records. "All Women Are Bitches" was produced by Walter Sobczak and Fifth Column. Despite being controversial and receiving little airplay, the recording was reviewed by Everett True and voted "Single Of The Week" in the UK music publication Melody Maker. This song was included as well on their last full-length recording, 36C, released in 1994. That same year a video for the song Donna was also released. It was the flipside of the 1992 single and was also on the album.

The band broke up in early 1995, playing their final show in Ottawa. Jones has said the band were frustrated that she was too busy with a gallery in New York and many other projects. This led to Azar quitting after a missed an opportunity to tour the UK.

The band's last recording was released in 2002, on the Kill Rock Stars compilation, Fields And Streams.

Caroline Azar again teamed up with G.B. Jones to create the installation/performance The Bruised Garden in 2013 at The Theatre Centre in Toronto, Ontario, which included music composed by the pair and credited to Fifth Column, making this their last song written together.

Band members have performed with other groups as well. Caroline Azar has recorded with Kickstand from New York, and Jolly Tambourine Man, Shadowy Men on a Shadowy Planet, Greek Buck and Hidden Cameras from Toronto. Since the breakup of the band: Azar produces her librettos/compositions for her dramatic musicals MAN-O-REXIC and D.I.N.K and other musical commissions. In 2015, Azar combined Wilfred Owen's anti-war poem Anthem for Doomed Youth with original music she composed for Peter Hinton's play The End at Theatre 20. Azar surprised audiences with her (2018 and 2019) two-part one-woman comedy stand up walking tour/lecture on the absurdity of civics, expressly written for actress-comedienne Jamillah Ross as PEO Rita Mae Nelson entitled "St. Peon Of The People" and "St. Peon of Parkdale". The third installment was entitled "St. Peon Of The Planet" and was slated to go to The Edinburgh Festival, also starring GB Jones and Joel Gibb.

Beverly Breckenridge toured with The Spinnanes and was also a member of Phono-Comb.

Prior to her involvement with Fifth Column, Jones was part of the electropunk band Bunny and the Lakers. She has collaborated with the Italian dark ambient group Mariae Nascenti and appeared on the single "Party with the Devil" by Agnoema. Jones now performs with Opera Arcana. In 2015, Caroline Azar teamed up with Opera Arcana to create a theatrical performance called The Bruised Spirits of Southern Ontario, an adult gothic folk musical experience based on the music of Opera Arcana, featuring Jones and Minus Smile (formerly of Kids On TV). Azar wrote the story (inspired by Jones' and Kerr's trance-based meditations) and directed and produced the experimental multi media event for Opera Arcana at Videofag (run by Jordan Tannahill and William Ellis). Opera Arcana appeared as guest musicians on UK artist Nick Hudson's 2016 release Ganymede in a State of War. In 2017, Opera Arcana recorded an original soundtrack for the film Downroad by Kelly Wydryk, released on CD in 2019.

Fifth Column have been nominated for a Polaris Music Prize in the Heritage section for the 2016 Polaris Music Prize, 2017 Polaris Music Prize, and 2018 Polaris Music Prize.

== In popular culture ==
In 2004, the song "All Women Are Bitches" was covered and re-imagined by the band Lesbians On Ecstasy on their self-titled debut album, Lesbians on Ecstasy, as "Bitchsy". In 2005, it was remixed and sampled along with "Bitchsy" by Kids on TV for the compilation album Giggles in the Dark.

In 2012, a documentary film by Kevin Hegge, called She Said Boom: The Story of Fifth Column was released featuring interviews with band members Caroline Azar, G.B. Jones, and Beverly Breckenridge, with commentary on the influence of Fifth Column by Toronto artist John Brown, Vaginal Davis, Kathleen Hanna and Bruce LaBruce.

== Discography ==
=== Albums ===
- To Sir with Hate (1985), Hide Records
- All-Time Queen of the World (1990), Hide Records
- 36C (1994), K Records

=== EPs ===
- Fifth Column EP (also known as Boy, Girl EP) (1983), Voicespondence Records

=== Singles ===
- "All Women Are Bitches/Donna" (1992), K Records
- "Don't" (7" split single with God Is My Co-Pilot) (1994), Outpunk Records
- "I Love You, But" (7" split single with Trailer Queen) (1995), Dark Beloved Cloud Records

=== Soundtracks ===
- Work (soundtrack for the video by Paulette Phillips and Geoffrey Shea, cassette-only release) (1989), Hide Records & Tapes

=== Compilation appearances ===
- "Hit the Dirt", "Lapsed State", "Dry Goods", "Pick Ups", "Trojans", Boy/Girl" on Urban Scorch (1981), Some Products (cassette only)
- "Incident Prone" on Urban Renewal (1984), Hide Tape 4 (cassette only)
- "Right Hook" on Dementia 5 (1985), Hide Tape 5 (cassette only)
- "The Fairview Mall Story" on J.D.s Top Ten Hit Parade Tape (1990), Hide Records & Tapes (cassette only)
- "Like This" on Brave New Waves (1991), CBC Records
- "Yo-Yo" on The Yo-Yo Gang (soundtrack for the film by G.B. Jones) (1992), Bitch Nation Records & Tapes (cassette only)
- "Chewing Gum" on Keep on the Sunny Side: A Tribute to the Carter Family (1993), Amoeba Records
- "Bad Madelaine" on Wired for Sound (1993), CKLN-FM
- "All Women Are Bitches" on International Hip Swing (1993), K Records
- "Detox Killer/Erotic Thriller" on Rock Stars Kill (1994), Kill Rock Stars
- "Don't" on Free to Fight (1995), Chainsaw Records/Candy Ass Records (co-release)
- "Imbecile" on Fields and Streams (2002), Kill Rock Stars

=== Soundtrack appearances ===
- Fifth Column at the Funnel, directed by John Porter (1982)
- Work, directed by Paulette Phillips and Geoffrey Shea (1987)
- The Troublemakers, directed by G.B. Jones (1990)
- The Yo-Yo Gang, directed by G.B. Jones (1992)
- My Niagara, directed by Helen Lee (1992)
- A Gun for Jennifer, directed by Todd Morris (1996)
- She's Real, directed by Lucy Thane (1997)
- Queercore: A Punk-u-mentary, directed by Scott Treleaven (1997)
- The Law of Enclosures, directed by John Greyson (2000)
- She Said Boom: The Story of Fifth Column, directed by Kevin Hegge (2012)

=== Videography ===
- Donna, directed by Friday Myers (1994)
- Like This, directed by Bruce LaBruce (1990)

== Band members ==
=== Recent line-up ===
- G.B. Jones (drums, guitar, vocals)
- Caroline Azar (vocals, organ, guitar)
- Beverly Breckenridge (bass; 1986 -) (also of Phono-Comb)

=== Former members ===
- Kathleen Pirrie Adams (bass; 1980–1982)
- Janet Martin (guitar; 1980–1985)
- Anita Smith (bass; 1982–1986)
- Charlotte Briede (guitar; 1985–1990)
- David Keyes (of The Polkaholics) (drums; 1989)
- Joel Wasson (drums; 1990–1992)
- Chaz Salmon (guitar; 1990–1992)
- Michelle Breslin (of Karaoke and Sadoceanspacebear) (guitar; 1992–1995)
- Don Pyle (of Shadowy Men on a Shadowy Planet and Phono-Comb) (drums; 1992–1993)
- Donna Dresch (of Team Dresch) (guitar; 1993)
- Torry Colichio (drums; 1993–1994)
- Luc Menard (drums; 1995–1995)
- Anne McLean (bass; years unknown)

== See also ==
- List of all-female bands
- List of bands from Canada
