= Track Two (Enough Is Enough) =

1982 Canadian documentary film

- Directed by: Harry Sutherland
- Written by: Jack Lemmon
- Produced by: Gord Keith; Harry Sutherland
- Starring: Margaret Atwood; John Sewell
- Cinematography: Leonidas Zourdoumis
- Edited by: Gord Keith
- Music by: Carole Pope; Kevan Staples
- Production company: KLS Entertainment
- Distributed by: DEC Films; First Run Features
- Release date: July 1, 1982 (Bloor Cinema)
- Running time: 90 minutes
- Country: Canada
- Language: English

Track Two (Enough Is Enough) is a Canadian documentary film, directed by Harry Sutherland and released in 1982. The film documents the struggle for gay liberation in Toronto in the early 1980s, focusing principally on the mass protest mobilizations that followed Operation Soap in February 1981.

The film takes its title from the Toronto Police Service's use of "Track Two" as a code word for the Church and Wellesley gay village in the era. ("Track One" was their code for a different part of the city with a significant presence of prostitutes.)

Figures appearing in the film include former Toronto mayor John Sewell, historian June Callwood, novelist Margaret Atwood, broadcaster Laurier LaPierre, and LGBTQ community figures George Hislop, Brent Hawkes, Chris Bearchell, Gerald Hannon and Ken Popert.

== Production ==
The film had originally been conceived as a documentary about the 1980 Toronto municipal election, focusing in particular on Hislop's campaign for a Toronto City Council seat, which had he won would have made him the city's first openly gay alderman. They approached CBC Television to pitch the film, only to be rejected with a claim that the CBC had "already done gays to death".

Hislop lost, however, and Sutherland and his producer Gord Keith were unsure how to proceed until Operation Soap occurred a matter of weeks later, enabling them to recontextualize some of the footage they had already filmed, while expanding the film's focus toward a much larger, ongoing story. They went out intending to film a modest protest that night, only to be greeted by a massive march of thousands.

The film's score was composed by Carole Pope and Kevan Staples of the band Rough Trade. Their score included the song "Endless Night", which also appeared on the band's 1982 album Shaking the Foundations.

== Distribution ==
The film received its premiere screening on July 1, 1982, at Toronto's Bloor Cinema. It later received a number of theatrical screenings at Canadian and international film festivals, including the 1982 Toronto International Film Festival and the 33rd Berlin International Film Festival.

After many years of being virtually forgotten, with the only two remaining prints of the film in existence held by the National Archives of Canada and the Bibliothèque et Archives nationales du Québec, the film received a digital restoration funded by Pink Triangle Press in 2014.

== Critical response ==
Film critic Jay Scott identified the film's failure to receive a Genie Award nomination for Best Feature Length Documentary at the 4th Genie Awards as one of the year's most egregious snubs, writing that "there are times when Genie is fearless when it comes to omitting the deserving. Just like Oscar."

For Cinema Canada, David Eames wrote that "Is Track Two a good film? Perhaps. Is it a great film? Most definitely. Are there difficulties? Decidedly. One wonders why the police were not interviewed in this film. Their short appearance, via a television talk-show, is, curiously enough, one of this film's funniest and more telling moments. The makers of Track Two didn't need to worry about gunning down the police. As this segment proved, all they needed to do was give them a shovel and let them dig their own grave."
