= The Confessional (film) =

- Directed by: Robert Lepage
- Written by: Robert Lepage
- Produced by: Philippe Carcassonne; David Puttnam; Denise Robert
- Starring: Lothaire Bluteau; Patrick Goyette; Jean-Louis Millette
- Cinematography: Alain Dostie
- Edited by: Emmanuelle Castro
- Music by: Sacha Puttnam
- Distributed by: Alliance Films (Canada); Pan-Européenne Distribution (France); Curzon Artificial Eye (United Kingdom)
- Release date: August 24, 1995 (Italy)
- Running time: 100 minutes
- Countries: Canada; France; United Kingdom
- Languages: English, French

The Confessional (French: Le Confessionnal) is a 1995 mystery-drama film directed by Robert Lepage.

The film is set in Quebec City, in two distinct time periods. In the present day, Pierre Lamontagne (Lothaire Bluteau) searches for his estranged brother Marc (Patrick Goyette) to help unravel a family mystery. The mystery itself unfolds in flashbacks set against the backdrop of Alfred Hitchcock's 1952 filming of I Confess in the city.

The cast also includes Ron Burrage as Hitchcock, Kristin Scott Thomas as his assistant, and Jean-Louis Millette as Raymond Massicotte, Marc's lover who also holds the key to unlocking the Lamontagne family's secrets.

== Plot ==
The Confessional is set in Quebec City in 1952, during the time Alfred Hitchcock was filming I Confess. The city is transitioning into the modern era due to the advent of television and its initial exposure to Hollywood. A character resembling Hitchcock is depicted during the local premiere of I Confess.

The story shifts between events in the early '50s and 1989. In 1989, Pierre Lamontagne returns to Quebec City from China for his father's funeral. He struggles to find his adopted brother, Marc. They eventually reunite in a gay sauna. The brothers embark on a quest to discover Marc’s biological father, initially believed to be a parish priest. Marc's mother, Rachel, after multiple visits to the confessional, gave birth to Marc and later took her own life.

The film often revisits the making of I Confess, centering on Hitchcock's assistant as she interacts with the local church and organizes auditions for Hitchcock. Various characters, such as a mysterious gentleman, play significant roles in the unfolding narrative.

== Cast ==
- Lothaire Bluteau as Pierre LaMontagne
- Patrick Goyette as Marc LaMontagne
- Jean-Louis Millette as Raymond Massicotte
- Kristin Scott Thomas as Assistant to Hitchcock
- Ron Burrage as Alfred Hitchcock
- Richard Fréchette as André LaMontagne
- François Papineau as Paul-Émile LaMontagne
- Marie Gignac as Françoise LaMontagne
- Normand Daneau as The Young Priest Massicotte
- Anne-Marie Cadieux as Manon
- Suzanne Clément as Rachel
- Lynda Lepage-Beaulieu as Jeanne d'Arc
- Pascal Rollin as Parish Priest LaLiberte
- Billy Merasty as "Moose"
- Paul Hébert as Parish Priest (1989)

== Awards and nominations ==
The film was selected as the Canadian entry for the Best Foreign Language Film at the 68th Academy Awards, but was not accepted as a nominee.

In 2001, an industry poll conducted by Playback named it the 13th best Canadian film of the preceding 15 years.

Award	Date of ceremony	Category	Recipient(s)	Result	Ref.
Genie Awards	1996	Best Picture	Denise Robert	Won	
Genie Awards	1996	Best Director	Robert Lepage	Won	
Genie Awards	1996	Best Actor	Lothaire Bluteau	Nominated	
Genie Awards	1996	Best Supporting Actress	Anne-Marie Cadieux	Nominated	
Genie Awards	1996	Best Supporting Actress	Marie Gignac	Nominated	
Genie Awards	1996	Best Art Direction/Production Design	François Laplante	Won	
Genie Awards	1996	Best Cinematography	Alain Dostie	Nominated	
Genie Awards	1996	Best Costume Design	Barbara Kidd	Nominated	
Genie Awards	1996	Best Editing	Emmanuelle Castro	Nominated	
Genie Awards	1996	Best Overall Sound	Jean-Claude Laureux, Jo Caron, Hans Peter Strobl	Nominated	
Genie Awards	1996	Best Sound Editing	Nick Berry, Jérôme Décarie, Jacques Plante, Diane Boucher, Antoine Morin	Nominated	
Genie Awards	1996	Claude Jutra Award	Robert Lepage	Won	

== See also ==
- List of films featuring diabetes
- List of submissions to the 68th Academy Awards for Best Foreign Language Film
- List of Canadian submissions for the Academy Award for Best Foreign Language Film
