= Letters of Transit (film) =

1991 Canadian film by Manon Briand

- Film poster
- French: Les Sauf-conduits
- Directed by: Manon Briand
- Written by: Manon Briand
- Produced by: Manon Briand
- Starring: Julie Lavergne; Patrick Goyette; Luc Picard
- Cinematography: Yves Bélanger
- Edited by: Richard Comeau
- Music by: Pierre Messier
- Production company: Les Films de l'Autre
- Release date: 1991
- Running time: 56 minutes
- Country: Canada
- Language: French

Letters of Transit (French: Les Sauf-conduits) is a Canadian short drama film, directed by Manon Briand and released in 1991. The film stars Julie Lavergne, Patrick Goyette and Luc Picard.

== Synopsis ==
The film revolves around Alice, Hubert and Marc, three people who become drawn into a love triangle while participating in a community attempt to establish a Guinness Book world record for egg tossing. Alice desires Hubert who desires Marc who desires Alice.

== Cast ==
- Julie Lavergne as Alice
- Patrick Goyette as Hubert
- Luc Picard as Marc
- Yves Pelletier as Herve
- Claude Poissant as Chef
- Rodrigue Jean as Server
- Genevieve Legault as Bistro patron
- Richard Mondoux as Bistro patron
- Marie-Eve Pion as Child at shop
- Vincent Mondoux as Child at shop
- Claudine Paquette as Cashier
- Geoffroy Gosselin as Poster hanger
- Nicolas Moumouris as Work colleague
- Francois Turcotte as Work colleague
- David Gaucer as Alice Cooper model

== Reception ==
Le Devoir commented that "the film treads the well-trodden paths of the love triangle, but constantly plays with form. Were it not for a somewhat amateurish production and a few clunky moments, this film could have risen from the ground and swept us away. As it stands, it is a breath of fresh air, seen through the lens of a feminine gaze full of humor and charm. The acting is remarkably natural, especially Julie Lavergne's portrayal of a young graphic designer torn between the search for inspiration and the throes of unrequited love."

Film critic Jason Weickert wrote the "film is very true to life, the characters are believable, and you get a good idea what it's like to be trendy in Montreal ... although it is a little slow but the characters more than make up for it and the plot twist will have you saying - what the hell was that." Andrew McIntosh from the Canadian Film Encyclopedia said "in her arresting first film, director Manon Briand crafts poetic images that are striking, fresh and occasionally quirky, and elicits uncannily natural performances from her actors."

Critic Marc Horton opined that "Briand knows what she's doing with this film that explores the power of passion and friendship in a way that's unique and original. Her story about a trio of friends who want to set a Guinness record for the world's longest uncooked egg toss is a layered tale that becomes increasingly complex as the relationships between the three people change."

== Accolades ==
At the 1992 Rendez-vous Québec Cinéma, Briand won the Bourse Claude-Jutra for Most Promising Young Director, and Picard won the Prix Luce-Guilbault for Most Promising Young Actor. In 1992 the film won Canada's Golden Sheaf Awards for Best Drama Over 30 Minutes and Best Director at the Yorkton Film Festival. The film was later screened at the 1992 Toronto International Film Festival, where it won the award for Best Canadian Short Film. The film also took the Graine de Cinephage prize at the Créteil International Women's Film Festival.

== See also ==
- List of Canadian films of 1991
- List of French-language films
- List of LGBTQ-related films of 1991
