= We Know You Know =

Studio album by Lesbians on Ecstasy
- Released: April 10, 2007
- Genre: Electroclash
- Length: 40:44
- Label: Alien8 Recordings
- Producer: Efrim Menuck

Lesbians on Ecstasy chronology
Giggles in the Dark (2005)	We Know You Know (2007)

Professional ratings
Review scores
Source	Rating
Bande à part	6.9/10 (French)
Exclaim!	
GO	

We Know You Know is the third album by Montreal based group Lesbians On Ecstasy, released on April 10, 2007. It contains 10 songs and is the follow-up album to 2005 remix album Giggles in the Dark

The song Sisters in the Struggle reached #1 on the CBC Radio 3 chart show R3-30 for the week of June 28, 2007.

== Track listing ==
1. "Sisters in the Struggle" – 5:13
2. "Sedition" – 4:25
3. "The Cold Touch of Leather" – 3:11
4. "Victoria's Secret" – 3:24
5. "We Won't Give it Back" – 4:24
6. "Party Time (a womyn's luv)" – 3:53
7. "Is this the Way?" – 3:52
8. "Alone in the Madness" – 5:13
9. "It's Practically Freedom" – 3:43
10. "Mortified" – 3:26
