= Transcend (album) =

Studio album by Carole Pope
- Released: 2004
- Genre: Rock, Electronic
- Length: 36:37
- Label: True North; Le Petite Mort
- Producer: Carole Pope

Carole Pope chronology
Transcend (2004)	Landfall (2011)

Transcend is the first full-length studio album by Canadian singer/songwriter Carole Pope. The album was re-issued 1 January 2007 on True North Records.

== Track listing ==
1. "Transcend" 4:49
2. "Love Strikes Hard" 3:31
3. "World of One" 4:03
4. "Dream6" 3:22
5. "Seduction" 4:00
6. "Edible Flower" 3:25
7. "All Touch/No Contact" 3:37
8. "Shadows" 3:34
9. "Americana" 3:54

== Personnel ==
Performing:

- Ky Anto - Bass
- Alain Johannes - Bass, Drums, Guitar, Keyboards,
- Nick Kirgo - Guitar
- Chris McNeil - Drums
- Carole Pope - Composer, Vocals, Drum and Guitar Programming
- Tim Welch - Bass, Composer, Guitar,

Production:

- John Capek - Composer
- James Grimes - Design, Layout Design
- Alain Johannes - Mixing, Producer
- Craig McConnell - Engineer, Mixing
- Carole Pope - Producer
- Rob Sanzo - Engineer
- Tim Welch - Instrumentation
- John Whynot - Mixing
