= International Hip Swing =

Compilation album by various artists
- Released: 1993
- Genre: Alternative rock, indie pop, twee pop
- Label: K Records

Professional ratings
Review scores
| Source | Rating |
|---|---|
| Allmusic | 4.5/5 stars |

International Hip Swing is a compilation CD released by the label K Records in 1993. It is centered on the alternative rock, indie pop and twee pop genres.

International Hip Swing gathered together a selection of recordings previously released in the series of vinyl 7-inch EPs entitled International Pop Underground.

== Track listing ==
The album contains the following twenty songs:

1. Shadowy Men on a Shadowy Planet – "Rusty and Rover"
2. Melody Dog – "Tomorrow's World"
3. Some Velvet Sidewalk – "Apple"
4. Thee Headcoats – "Shouldn't Happen To A Dog"
5. Lois – "Long Time Gone" (The Everly Brothers cover)
6. Gravel – "Yesterday"
7. Brief Weeds – "(It's So Hard Not To) Say Hello"
8. Tiger Trap – "Hiding"
9. Snuff – "Den Den"
10. Mecca Normal – "Man Thinks 'Woman'"
11. Girl Trouble – "Tarantula"
12. Heavenly – "Escort Crash On Marsten Street"
13. Unrest – "Yes She Is My Skinhead Girl"
14. Duck Hunt – "Vacation"
15. Teenage Fanclub – "Free Again" (Alex Chilton cover)
16. Cannanes – "No One"
17. Seaweed – "Deer Trap"
18. Beat Happening – "Look Around"
19. Fifth Column – "All Women Are Bitches"
20. The McTells – "Clean"

== See also ==
- International Pop Underground Convention
