= No Skin Off My Ass =

- Directed by: Bruce LaBruce
- Written by: Bruce LaBruce
- Starring: Bruce LaBruce; G. B. Jones; Klaus von Brücker
- Distributed by: Strand Releasing
- Release date: 1991
- Running time: 73 minutes
- Country: Canada
- Language: English

No Skin Off My Ass is a 1991 comedy-drama film by Bruce LaBruce.

LaBruce's debut feature film provides a template for many of the themes in LaBruce's later movies. Explicit sex scenes between LaBruce's character and von Brucker's are interwoven with a radical political message.

No Skin Off My Ass played at film festivals around the world and quickly became a cult film. Famously, Kurt Cobain declared it his favourite film. The film's soundtrack includes songs by several punk bands such as Frightwig and Beefeater.

== Plot ==
A punk hairdresser (Bruce LaBruce), known only as "The Hairdresser", becomes obsessed with a mute neo-Nazi skinhead (Klaus von Brücker). Jonesy (G. B. Jones), a lesbian underground film director and the skinhead's sister, attempts to bring her brother and the hairdresser together. Throughout the film, Jonesy is also working on a documentary around the Symbionese Liberation Army. The cast also includes Fifth Column band members Caroline Azar and Beverly Breckenridge.

== Cast ==
- Bruce LaBruce as "The Hairdresser"
- G. B. Jones as "Jonesy"
- Klaus von Brücker as "The Skinhead"
- Caroline Azar
- Beverly Breckenridge
- Laurel Pervis
- Kate Ashley
- Jena von Brücker

== Production ==
No Skin Off My Ass was filmed in Toronto on a budget of $14,000. Most of the cast were people LaBruce previously knew and worked with, helping to keep the cost down: the main cast was LaBruce himself and von Brücker, who were boyfriends at the time, and some of the film's runtime is pornographic footage of the two having sex. G.B. Jones, who LaBruce worked frequently with on projects like the J.D.s zines, also acted in the film.

LaBruce shot and edited No Skin Off My Ass on 8mm black and white film, blown up to 16mm in post-production.

== Release ==
LaBruce's debut, according to him, "correspond[ed] with the burgeoning gay and lesbian film festival circuit and just sort of became a cult film." Despite its enthusiastic reception, LaBruce "never expected it to go outside of underground bars in Toronto or alternative art spaces." The movie has been shown at multiple film festivals and queer community events, including its debut at the 1991 Chicago Lesbian & Gay International Film Festival, SPEW: The Homographic Convergence, the 1993 Baltimore Lesbian and Gay Film Festival, and many others.

More recently, No Skin Off My Ass has been screened at the Museum of Modern Art twice, at Outfest Los Angeles in 2016, and at Visionär Film Fest in 2019.

== Reception ==
The film is discussed as "a queer retelling of Robert Altman's That Cold Day in the Park," a 1969 psychological thriller about obsession. Altman's film is based on a novel by the same name by Peter Miles. According to LaBruce,

Altman de-queered it, so I decided to re-queer it... When I showed the film for the first time in Los Angeles in 1991, somebody brought Miles to my screening and he said my no-budget Super-8 movie was better than the Altman version! He gave me an autographed copy of his novel inscribed: "You got it right."

LaBruce's No Skin Off My Ass is, according to Alexander Cavaluzzo, "the voice of hardcore, tongue-in-cheek dissent with porn-packed political allegories." The film is viewed today as "a homocore classic... a complex exploration of how subculture is articulated through style, and a poignant study in erotic fascination."
