= She Said Boom: The Story of Fifth Column =

2012 Canadian documentary film

- Directed by: Kevin Hegge
- Produced by: Kevin Hegge; Kelly Jenkins
- Starring: Fifth Column
- Cinematography: Viktor Cahoj
- Edited by: Oliver Husain
- Music by: Fifth Column
- Distributed by: Bohemia Media
- Release date: April 27, 2012 (Hot Docs)
- Running time: 64 minutes
- Country: Canada
- Language: English

She Said Boom: The Story of Fifth Column is a Canadian documentary film, directed by Kevin Hegge and released in 2012. The film centres on the history of Fifth Column, a punk rock band from Toronto, Ontario, who were early innovators in the queercore movement.

In addition to band members Beverly Breckenridge, Caroline Azar, G. B. Jones, Anita Smith and Michelle Breslin, other figures also appearing in the film include Kathleen Hanna, Bruce LaBruce, Jena von Brücker and Vaginal Davis.

The film premiered at the Hot Docs Canadian International Documentary Festival in April 2012, and was subsequently screened at the Inside Out Film and Video Festival in November.

It won the award for Best Canadian Film at Inside Out.
