= Operation Soap =

Police raid of gay bathhouses in Toronto, Canada

Operation Soap was a raid by the Metropolitan Toronto Police against four gay bathhouses in Toronto, Ontario, Canada, which took place on February 5, 1981. Nearly three hundred men were arrested, the largest mass arrest in Canada since the 1970 October crisis, before the record was broken during the 2006 Stanley Cup Playoffs in Edmonton, Alberta.

Although many gay bathhouses had previously been raided in Canada and other smaller raids followed, Operation Soap is considered a special turning point in the history of the lesbian, gay, bisexual and transgender community in Canada; the raids and their aftermath are today widely considered to be the Canadian equivalent of the 1969 Stonewall riots in New York City. Mass protests and rallies were held denouncing the incident. These evolved into Toronto's current Pride Week, which is now one of the world's largest gay pride festivals and celebrated its 44th anniversary in 2025.

Most charges connected to the incident were eventually dropped or discharged, although some bathhouse owners were fined $40,000. Canada's "bawdy-house" law, under which the charges in this raid were laid, remained in effect until it was repealed in 2019, but was only rarely applied against gay establishments after the trials connected to the 1981 raids ended.

== Precursors ==
The murder of Emanuel Jaques, an immigrant shoeshine boy, led to large protests to "clean up" Yonge Street in 1977. The political momentum from the protests would lead to Toronto police raiding many adult stores, body-rub parlours, and shoeshine stands along Yonge Street. Police would raid these establishments and make charges against business owners, effectively closing down many businesses even if many charges were eventually dropped.

Mayor John Sewell strongly supported gay rights in his 1978–1980 term as mayor. He condemned police raids, including the controversial raid on the gay magazine The Body Politic, where Toronto Police confiscated the newspaper's subscription lists, advertisers lists, and other user information. Sewell strongly opposed these acts; however, his views ultimately cost him re-election. Without strong civic condemnation of raids on gay establishments, Operation Soap was the first raid on a gay establishment after Sewell left office.

== Timeline (1981–1985) ==
=== 1981 ===
- February 5: At 11 p.m., more than 150 police simultaneously raid the Club Baths, the Romans II Health and Recreation Spa, the Richmond Street Health Emporium and the Barracks in Toronto. Twenty owners, including George Hislop and Peter Maloney, are charged with "keeping a common bawdyhouse"; 286 men are charged as found-ins. The Richmond is so heavily damaged that it never reopens.
- February 6: Over 3,000 protestors stage a mass demonstration against the raids, blocking traffic at several major intersections.
- February 11: Hislop announces that he will run as an independent protest candidate in the riding of St. George in the 1981 provincial election.
- February 16: Metropolitan Community Church of Toronto pastor Brent Hawkes begins a 25-day hunger strike.
- February 20: Over 4,000 protestors march from Queen's Park to 52 Division of the Toronto Police.
- March 6: A "Gay Freedom Rally", effectively Toronto's first Pride event, is held. Speakers, including author Margaret Atwood and Member of Parliament Svend Robinson, denounce the bathhouse raids. Robinson would later become Canada's first openly gay Member of Parliament in 1989; although he was already an MP and a civil libertarian activist at the time of the raids, he had not yet publicly come out.
- March 12: Hawkes ends his hunger strike when Toronto City Council asks the mayor's community and race relations advisor, Daniel Hill, to investigate the bathhouse raids and the larger issue of police relations with the gay community. Hill later declines, but Arnold Bruner takes on the investigation on July 13.
- March 19: The provincial election is held; Hislop loses to Progressive Conservative candidate Susan Fish. Fish was also supportive of the gay community in her riding; shortly after her election, she participated in a rally at Queen's Park to support the inclusion of sexual identity in the Ontario Human Rights Code.
- March 30: Charges stemming from an earlier raid at the Barracks go to trial.
- April 21: Six more people, including Hislop, are charged in connection to the February 5 raid.
- May 30: A similar raid takes place in Edmonton, Alberta.
- June 12: The March 30 trial finds two Barracks employees guilty of keeping a common bawdyhouse; three owners are found not guilty.
- June 16: Police raid two more bathhouses, the Back Door Gym and Sauna and the International Steam Baths, arresting a further 21 men.
- June 20: Demonstrators protest the June 16 raids; police violence against the protestors is reported.
- July 3: The New Democratic Party calls for the bawdyhouse section of the Criminal Code to be repealed.
- September 24: Bruner's report, Out of the Closet: Study of Relations Between Homosexual Community and Police, is released. It recognizes the gay community as a legitimate community, and calls for a permanent dialogue committee between the community and the Toronto Police.
- September 30: A man charged with assaulting a police officer at the June 20 protests is acquitted in provincial court; the judge calls for an investigation into police conduct.
- October 7: Toronto's lesbian community holds its first Dykes in the Street march.
- November 2: The first keeper trial from the February 5 raids comes before the court. One employee pleads guilty, but is given an absolute discharge; five others have their charges withdrawn.
- November 20: The head of the Club Baths pleads guilty to conspiracy and is fined $40,000.

=== 1982 ===
- January 11: The owner of the Richmond Street baths pleads guilty; five other charges are dropped.
- January 20: Police chief Jack Ackroyd issues a statement that gay people are entitled to "the same rights, respect, service and protection as all citizens", and recognizing them as "legitimate members of the community". Gay leaders note, however, that his statement recognizes gay individuals, but says nothing about the legitimacy of "the gay community".
- February 6: A demonstration commemorating the anniversary of the raids is held.
- March 26: One owner of the Back Door Gym is found guilty and fined $3,000; two others are given conditional discharges.
- June 2: A full-page ad supporting repeal of the bawdyhouse laws, signed by over 1,400 people, appears in The Globe and Mail.

=== 1983–1985 ===
By April 1983, 87 per cent of the "found-ins" charged in the Toronto and Montreal raids have been acquitted at trial; 36 individuals have been found guilty but received absolute or conditional discharges. The last remaining charge related to the 1981 raids was settled by plea bargain on February 7, 1985.

== Retrospect ==
At the time it was widely believed that the raids were approved by Attorney General of Ontario Roy McMurtry and the provincial government. In a 2007 interview, however, McMurtry said that this was not the case: "The irony of the whole thing was that I had expressed my concern to the chief of police; that it really looked like we were dissolving into a police state. The whole thing looked terrible. Without a doubt, that was one of my most frustrating experiences." McMurtry subsequently served as Chief Justice of Ontario and wrote the 2003 decision of Ontario's Court of Appeal in favour of same-sex marriage.

Track Two (Enough Is Enough), a documentary film about the raids and their aftermath, was released in 1982 by filmmaker Harry Sutherland. After many years of being virtually forgotten, with the only two remaining prints of the film in existence held in the National Archives of Canada and the Bibliothèque et Archives nationales du Québec, the film received a digital restoration funded by Pink Triangle Press in 2014.

The raids also inspired Rough Trade's song "Endless Night", which appeared on their 1982 album Shaking the Foundations and served as the theme music to Track Two (Enough Is Enough).

In 2016, the play RAID: Operation Soap, written by Raymond Helkio and starring performance artist Keith Cole and actor Johnny Salib, premiered to a sold-out audience at Buddies In Bad Times Theatre in commemoration of 35 years since the raids. The same year, then-Toronto Police chief Mark Saunders expressed regrets on behalf of the Toronto Police Service for the raids.

Journalist Matthew Hays has criticized the media's frequent labelling of the Toronto raids as being Canada's Stonewall; according to Hays, that distinction should be extended to the 1977 Mystique and Truxx bathhouse raids in Montreal, which led within a few months to Quebec becoming the first government in Canada to pass a law banning discrimination on the basis of sexual orientation.

The raids and their aftermath are profiled as a key moment in Canadian LGBTQ history in Nancy Nicol's 2002 documentary film Stand Together, and in Noam Gonick's 2025 documentary film Parade: Queer Acts of Love and Resistance.

In 2026, Heritage Toronto unveiled a historic plaque on Wellesley Street, commemorating the protest mobilization that followed the raids as an important watershed moment in the history of both the LGBTQ community and the city as a whole.

== See also ==
- Timeline of LGBT history in Canada
