= Patrick Goyette =

Canadian film and television actor

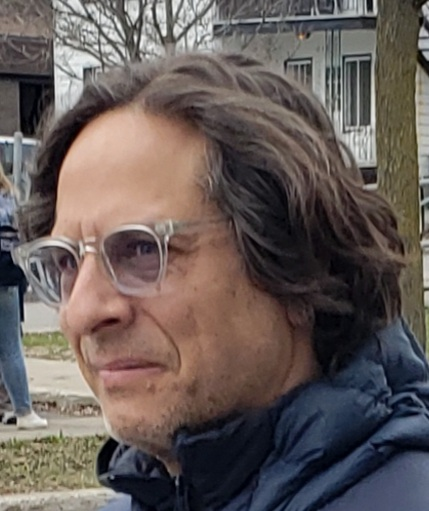
- Born: September 16, 1965 (age 60)
- Years active: 1990s–present

Patrick Goyette (born September 16, 1965) is a Canadian actor from Quebec, most noted for his starring roles in the films The Confessional (Le Confessionnal) and Polygraph (Le Polygraphe).

He was a Dora Mavor Moore Award nominee for Best Leading Actor (General Theatre) in 1996, for his performance in the stage play The Seven Streams of the River Ota.

He directed the 2005 short film J'te laisserai pas tomber, which was a Jutra Award nominee for Best Live Action Short Film at the 7th Jutra Awards. He has also directed the short films Le Secret (2000) and Faits divers (2010).

== Filmography ==
Year	Title	Role	Notes
1989	In the Belly of the Dragon (Dans le ventre du dragon)	Nurse #5	
1990	Les Filles de Caleb	Ovide Pronovost	TV series
1991	Letters of Transit (Les Sauf-conduits)	Hubert	
1991	Nelligan	Joseph Melançon	
1992	Coyote	Mario Brando	
1994	Les grands procès	Me. Bienvenue	TV series
1995	The Confessional (Le Confessionnal)	Marc Lamontagne	
1997	Paparazzi	Pierre Dumont	TV series
1997	Ces enfants d'ailleurs	Jerzy Pawlowski	TV series
1997	Polygraph (Le Polygraphe)	François Tremblay	
1999	Four Days	Gray	
2000	Tag	Bruno Langevin	TV series
2000	Chartrand et Simonne	Gérard Pelletier	TV series
2000	The Three Madeleines (Les Fantômes des trois Madeleine)	Pierre	
2000	Task Force: Caviar	The Prince	
2001	Mon meilleur ennemi	Martin Rivard	TV series
2002	The Mysterious Miss C. (La Mystérieuse mademoiselle C.)	The Beast	
2004	Daniel and the Superdogs		
2004	Battle of the Brave (Nouvelle-France)	Capitaine Tremblay	
2006	Without Her (Sans elle)	Charles	
2006	Les Hauts et les bas de Sophie Paquin	Bruce Thompson	TV series
2008	Lost Song	Pierre	
2009	La Promesse	Rémi	TV series
2010	Tactik	Michel Galipeau	TV series
2011	See How They Dance (Voyez comme ils dansent)	Brad	
2012	La Cicatrice	Paul Simoneau	
2021	Nous	Louis Paradis	TV series
2022	Family Game (Arsenault et fils)	Sergent Ross Ranger	
2023	Détective Surprenant: La fille au yeux de pierre	Sgt Marchessault	
2024	Stat	Alexandre	TV series
