= Carole Pope =

Canadian singer-songwriter

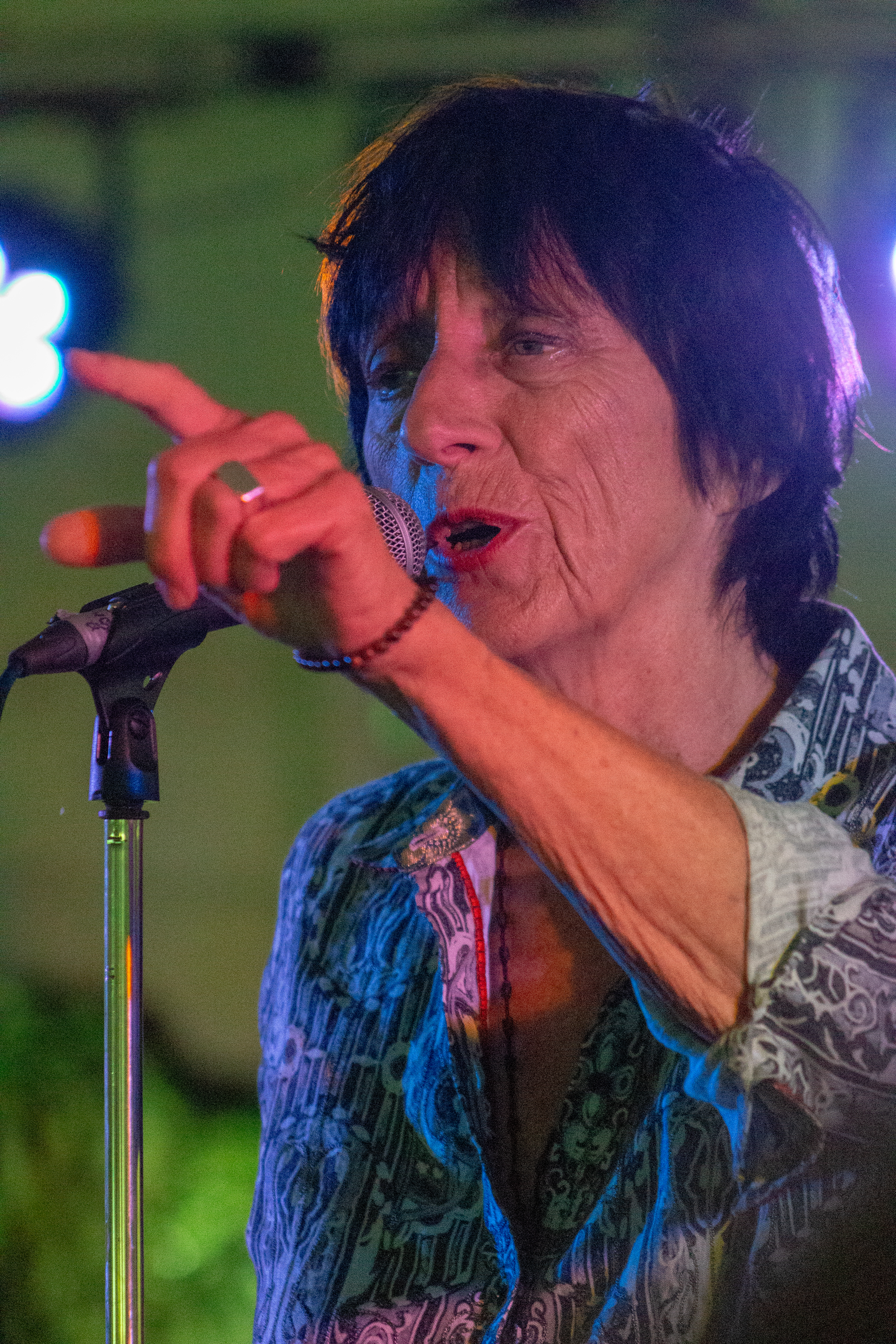
- Carole Pope performing in 2018

Background information
- Born: Carole Ann Pope; 6 August 1946 (age 80); Manchester, England
- Origin: Scarborough, Ontario, Canada
- Genres: Rock, electronic
- Occupation: Singer-songwriter
- Years active: 1968-present
- Labels: RPM Records, Le Petite Mort
- Formerly of: Rough Trade
- Website: carolepope.com

Carole Ann Pope (born 6 August 1946) is a British-born Canadian rock singer-songwriter, whose provocative blend of hard-edged new wave rock with explicit homoerotic and BDSM-themed lyrics made her one of the first openly lesbian entertainers to achieve mainstream fame.

== Early life ==
Pope was born on 6 August 1950 in the rural outskirts of Manchester in England. She was the oldest of four children born to Jack Pope, a salesperson, a member of the Communist Party of Great Britain, and a circus stilt walker, and to Celia, a music hall performer. Pope grew up with two sisters, Diane and Elaine, and a brother, Howard. At the age of five, Pope emigrated with her parents to Montreal. After a couple of years there, the family moved to the Toronto suburb of Scarborough, Ontario. She studied at Cedarbrae Collegiate Institute.

== Music career ==
=== 1968–1988: Rough Trade ===
Pope met her longtime musical partner Kevan Staples at a band audition in Scarborough. In 1968, they began performing together as a duo in Yorkville, which was Toronto's live music and arts district at the time. In 1970, they adopted the name O, changing it to The Bullwhip Brothers the following year. Clive A. Smith was also a member of O; Smith would later go on to co-found Canadian animation studio Nelvana and play such iconic on-screen characters as Mr. Pencil.

In 1975, Pope and Staples recruited several backup musicians and formed the band Rough Trade. Pope often performed in black leather pants and bondage attire. The band's first album, Rough Trade Live, was produced by Jack Richardson.

Whilst with Rough Trade, Pope sang backup vocals on Murray McLauchlan's album Into a Mystery, in 1980, and would go on to win the Juno Award for Most Promising Female Vocalist in 1981 and subsequently the Juno Award for Best Female Vocalist in 1982 and 1983.

Rough Trade released their first studio album, Avoid Freud, and also made an appearance in the Canadian horror film, Deadline, in 1980. They would win a Genie Award and four gold and two platinum records as the decade progressed. She and Kevan Staples co-wrote the 1983 single "Transformation" along with the track "Design for Living", for singer/songwriter Nona Hendryx's second studio album, Nona. Pope also appeared as a guest vocalist on the Payola$ single "Never Said I Loved You," which was a top 10 hit in 1983. She would team up again with Payola$ founder Paul Hyde to sing the duet "My Brilliant Career" on his album Living Off the Radar in 2000. She also sang the role of Primavera Nicholson in the COC production of R. Murray Schafer's Patria I in November 1987.

Pope and Staples also composed a score for the 1982 documentary film Track Two (Enough Is Enough), about the Operation Soap raids of 1981.

Although Rough Trade did not record or perform extensively after its final Deep Six in '86 tour, they did not officially break up until 1988. Since breaking up, the band has had numerous reunions, and in 2022, Rough Trade - The Musical, a musical based on the band's music (and the life of Pope's late brother, Howard), debuted at Joe's Pub, in Manhattan.

=== 1988–1999: Solo beginnings ===
After Rough Trade disbanded, Pope released her debut solo single in 1988, which was a cover of The Flirtations' 1968 soul hit, Nothing but a Heartache. The B-side was her self-penned song, I'm Not Blind. She relocated to Los Angeles in 1989 to pursue opportunities in soundtrack work and acting, and produced the soundtrack for The Silencer, a thriller movie directed by Amy Goldstein, which was released in 1992.

In 1995, Pope announced she was no longer living in Los Angeles. That same year, she released her debut EP, Radiate, featuring drummer Jack Irons. A music video was produced to promote the EP's third track, "Kiss The Ground". Pope also starred in the cabaret, Quiet Please, There's a Bitter, Petulant Diva on Stage, at Buddies in Bad Times Theatre. In 1997, Pope provided the voice for the schoolteacher in the animated version of Pippi Longstocking, and in 1999 playwright Bryden MacDonald staged Shaking the Foundations, a musical revue based on the music of Rough Trade.

=== 2000–2005: Release of autobiography and first solo album ===
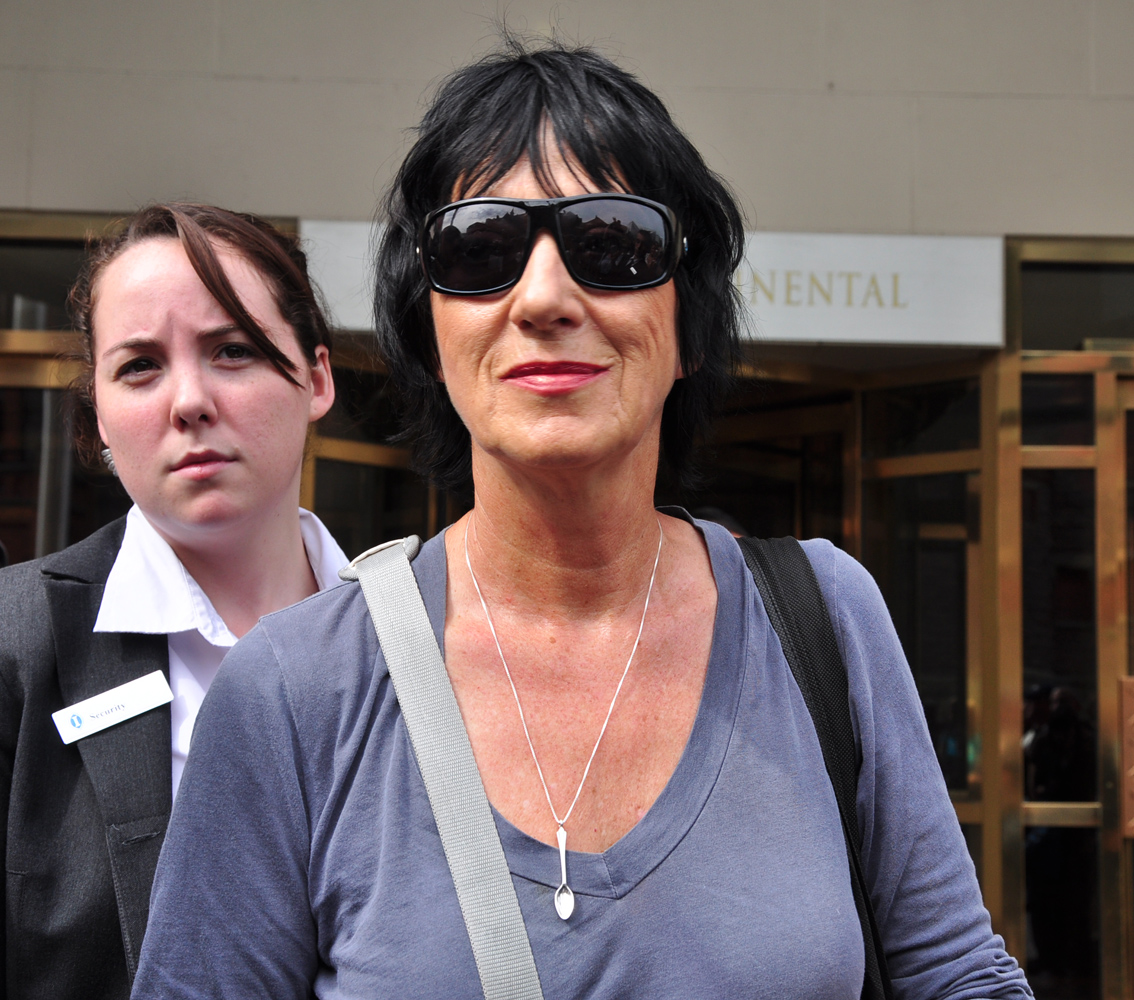
Pope at the 2009 Toronto International Film Festival

In 2000, Random House published Pope's autobiography, Anti Diva. The book included Pope's first public acknowledgement that she had been in a relationship with British singer Dusty Springfield in the early 1980s. That year she and Staples contributed a track to the Dusty Springfield tribute album Forever Dusty: Homage to an Icon. Anti Diva also revealed fleeting 1970s dalliances with comic actress Andrea Martin and music producer Bob Ezrin. Years later, Pope discussed attending Dusty Springfield's funeral where she spent time with the Pet Shop Boys, amongst other notables.

Soon afterwards, Pope re-recorded the Rough Trade single "High School Confidential" for the Queer as Folk season 1 soundtrack and appeared in the Toronto production of The Vagina Monologues in 2001. She would then move to New York City to continue writing and recording. In 2005, 21 years after her last EP, Pope returned to Los Angeles and released Transcend, her debut full-length solo album.

=== 2011–present: Second solo album, EP, collaborations, and Antidiva: The Carole Pope Confessions ===
In 2011, Pope released Landfall, her second full-length album, featuring a duet with Rufus Wainwright. That year she also was a guest vocalist on the album The Hills Are Alive by the Brooklyn Rundfunk Orkestrata.

Pope is an ambassador for the Harvey Milk School in New York City and a board director for the Songwriters Association of Canada. In 2015, Pope signed with Squirtgun Records (distributed by eOne Entertainment) to re-release the Music for Lesbians EP on 23 June 2015.

On 22 September 2017, Pope released the single, "This Is Not A Test". An accompanying music video, directed by Jasun Mark, was released on 8 May 2018. Later that same year, Pope collaborated with keyboardist Kevin Hearn to release the single, "Resist It", on 22 October 2018, which was later accompanied by a music video directed by Phillip Harder. A third single, "I'm There", produced in collaboration with Spoons' keyboardist Rob Preuss, was released the following year.

In 2021, Pope collaborated with Ottawa band Church of Trees to release the song "World's A Bitch". Later that same year, Pope worked with Canadian performer Clara Venice to produce the single "Speaking In Code". Venice had previously added her Theremin skills to Pope's 2017 single, "This Is Not A Test".

Pope served as a guest judge on the second episode of the third season of Canada's Drag Race in 2022, and narrated Marusya Bociurkiw's 2023 documentary film Analogue Revolution: How Feminist Media Changed the World. On 21 July 2023, it was revealed that a documentary based on Pope's autobiography is currently in the works. The documentary, titled Antidiva: The Carole Pope Confessions, was funded by The Canada Media Fund, with production being handled by Gay Agenda. The documentary opened the 33rd edition of Hot Docs Canadian International Documentary Festival in April 2026, and became available for streaming on CBC Gem on 24 July 2026.

== Personal life ==
As of 2024, Pope lives in Los Angeles, although she has previously resided in New York.

=== Health ===
In March 2018, Pope was forced to cancel a scheduled performance in Toronto due to a fractured ankle. Subsequently, she was compelled to cancel all of her scheduled performances for the remainder of the year due to mobility challenges that she had encountered during her tour. This ultimately resulted in a diagnosis of spinal stenosis. In order to assist with her living expenses following surgery, a fundraiser was established on GoFundMe.

== Solo discography ==
=== Albums ===
- Transcend (2005)
- Landfall (2011)

=== EPs ===
- Radiate (1995)
- The Silencer (1999)
- Music for Lesbians (2014; 2015 re-release with Squirtgun/eOne)

=== Singles ===
- "Nothing but a Heartache" / "I'm Not Blind" (1988) (B-side "I'm Not Blind" reissued in 2022)
- "Transcend" (1999)
- "World Of One" (2000)
- "Johnny Marr" (2007)
- "Shining Path/Tell Me" (2010)
- "Viral 01/Viral 02" (2011)
- "Francis Bacon" (2013)
- "Lesbians in the Forest" (featuring Peaches) (2013)
- "Vagina Wolf" (2014)
- "This Is Not a Test" (2017)
- "Resist It" (with Kevin Hearn) (2018)
- "I'm There" (with Rob Preuss) (2019)
- "All Touch / No Contact Live" (2020)
- "I Want to Live" (2020)
- "World's a Bitch" (2021) (with Church of Trees and Rob Preuss)
- "Speaking in Code" (2021) (with Clara Venice)
- "More Or Less" (2024)
- "Play Fisty For Me" (2024)
- "I Miss My Land" (2024)
- "Carole Pope (Live)" (2024)
- "Different Drum" (2026)

== Filmography ==
Year	Title	Role	Notes
1996	Dangerous Offender: The Marlene Moore Story	Bar Patron	TV movie
1997	Pippi Longstocking	Teacher	Film
1998	Elimination Dance	Partner of woman whose urine sample is lost in the mail	Short
2009	Suck	Club Bouncer	Film
2026	Antidiva: The Carole Pope Confessions	Self	Documentary
