= Beverly Breckenridge =

Canadian musician

Beverly Breckenridge is a musician, composer, and actress from Toronto, Ontario. She played bass for the bands Fifth Column and Phono-Comb.

In 1986, Breckenridge joined the post-punk band Fifth Column.

Beverly's first appearance on film was in No Skin Off My Ass, in 1991. In 2012, a documentary film by Kevin Hegge, called She Said Boom: The Story of Fifth Column was released featuring interviews with band members Caroline Azar, G.B. Jones, and Beverly Breckenrige, with commentary on the influence of Fifth Column by Kathleen Hanna, Vaginal Davis and Bruce LaBruce.

== Filmography ==
- She Said Boom: The Story of Fifth Column, directed by Kevin Hegge (2012)
- She's Real by Lucy Thane, 1996
- Donna, video for Fifth Column, directed by Friday Myers, 1994
- Airplane On The Highway, video for Bob Wiseman, directed by Caroline Azar, 1994
- The Yo-Yo Gang by G.B. Jones, 1992
- No Skin Off My Ass by Bruce LaBruce, 1991
- Like This, video for Fifth Column, directed by Bruce LaBruce and Fifth Column, 1990
