= Fields and Streams =

Compilation album by Various artists
- Released: 2002
- Genre: Alternative rock
- Label: Kill Rock Stars

Various artists chronology
| Fields and Streams (2002) | Tracks and Fields (2004) |

Fields and Streams is a double CD compilation album released by the label Kill Rock Stars on May 7, 2002.

== Track listing ==
CD 1

1. "Memo From The Desk of the Quails - The Quails
2. "Sex Object - Manda & The Marbles
3. "Waste of Time" - The Coolies
4. "Total Destruction" - Lost Sounds
5. "Noon Under The Trees" - The Rock*A*Teens
6. "Industrial Skyline" - Industrial Skyline
7. "Pick up You"- Dada Swing
8. "The Monster" - Stereo Total
9. "Caesar's Planet - Gene Defcon
10. "Male In Communication" - The Supreme Indifference
11. "Blame The Glass Man" - Mecca Normal
12. "Leading The Weird" - The Convocation Of...
13. "Blight Blues" - Beehive & The Barracudas
14. "Through The Swells" - Aislers Set
15. "Look At You Now, You're Crying" - Comet Gain
16. "The Slip That Hides You" - The Mona Reels
17. "Lake Is A Time Bomb" - I'm Being Good
18. "What Energy" - Drillboxignition
19. "Beautiful Fiction" - Braille Stars
20. "For The Win" - The Reputation
21. "Still No Sparks" - Delta Dart

CD 2

1. "That Girl" - Tender Trap
2. "New Scars" - Bangs
3. "Imbecile" - Fifth Column
4. "Ran Out" - The Dishes
5. "Hiding Behind The Moon" - Jeff Hanson
6. "Tiger In The Forest" - Mary Timony
7. "Modern Things" - Yeah Yeah Yeahs
8. "Dawn of Understand" - The Long Goodbye
9. "Missy" - Red Monkey
10. "Blue Boys" - Carla Bozulich
11. "Poseidon's Kiss" - The Process
12. "Leg Night" - Erase Errata
13. "Love Potions Poison" - Love Life
14. "Song of Scorn" - Deerhoof
15. "Queen Majesty" - Quasi
16. "All The Evils of the World" - The Mooney Suzuki
17. "Ode To The Go Cart" - Dirt Bike Annie
18. "17" - The Butchies
19. "My Assassin" - Lorelei
20. "If It's Not Grounded Then It's Not Dead" - Thoroughbred
21. "I Don't Know Where I'm Going" - Danielle Howle & The Tantrums
22. "Tell Me Once More" - Virginia North & The Them Wranch
23. "Knock Loud" - Neko Case
24. "Porcelein Throne" - Two Ton Boa
