= Cecilia Barriga =

Chilean-Spanish film director

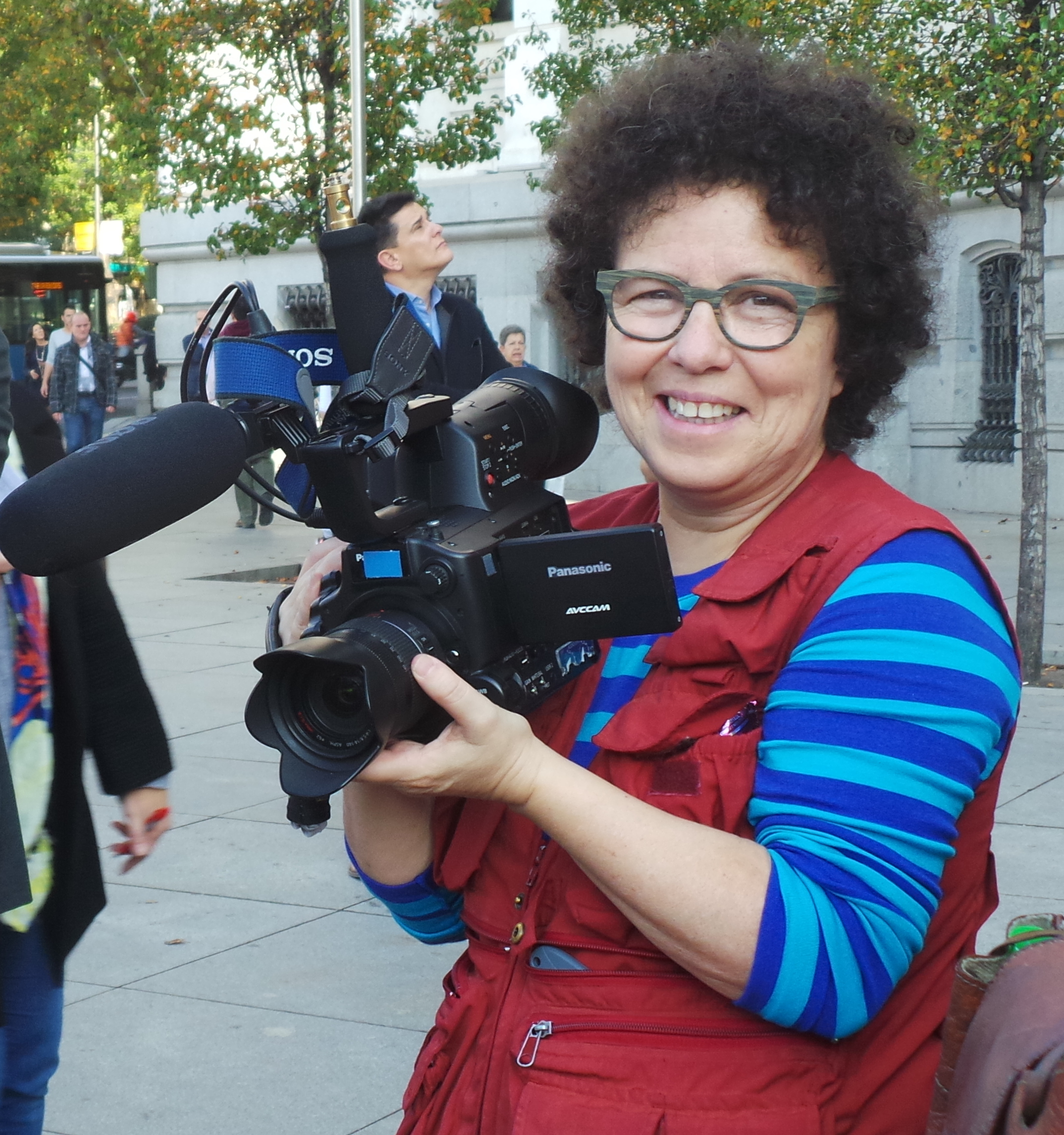
- Barriga in 2015 filming the 7N Spanish national march
- Born: 1957 (age 68–69); Concepción, Chile
- Education: Complutense University of Madrid; Columbia University
- Occupations: Filmmaker, director

Cecilia Barriga (born 1957) is a Chilean-Spanish film director. Her 1991 film Meeting Two Queens was shown at Montreal Women's Film and Video Festival and New York International Festival of Gay and Lesbian Film. She directed her first feature film Time's Up! in New York City. It premiered at the Donostia-San Sebastián Film Festival in 2000 as part of Zabaltegi.

== Education ==
She left home at 19 to study sound and image at the Complutense University of Madrid. In 1983 she began her career in cinema, and in 1984 completed her university degree. In 1994, she moved to New York to further her studies in screenwriting and video art at Columbia University.

== Meeting Two Queens (1991) ==
Meeting Two Queens or Encuentro entre dos Reinas is Barriga's attempt at re-editing and cutting various scenes from films featuring Hollywood stars Greta Garbo and Marlene Dietrich in order to create a space for lesbian identity politics and identity formation. It offers an alternative viewing of these famous Hollywood stars which effectively re-envisions them as icons of the burgeoning gay and lesbian movement of the early 1990s. Meeting Two Queens engages feminist politics due to it being a fan-made film for fans of Garbo and Dietrich - stars who are significant in film history, lesbian subculture, and feminist criticism. Barriga's film also assists in validating one's sexual identity with Hollywood role models, which is both empowering and liberating for the formation of gay identity and solidarity.

Mary Desjardins writes in Film Quarterly that, "Film scholars have placed these works within the avant-garde because their construction through appropriation and juxtaposition of fragments from a variety of films supposedly offers a commentary on the meaning process of all films." The critic B. Ruby Rich in New Queer Cinema: The Director’s Cut comments that Barriga's Meeting Two Queens, "re-edits Dietrich and Garbo movies to construct a dream narrative: get the girls together, help them meet, let them get it on".(Encuentro entre dos Reinas, 1991) In The Girls in the Back Room: Looking at the Lesbian Bar, Kelly Hankin notes that Meeting Two Queens, "skillfully juxtaposes spare parts from a range of classical Hollywood films to depict a romance between Greta Garbo and Marlene Dietrich".

== Filmography (director) ==
- Im Fluss (2008)
- El camino de Moises (2005)
- Ni locas, ni terroristas (2005)
- Atrapados en el paraíso (2001)
- Time's Up! (2001)
- Encuentro entre dos Reinas (1991)

== See also ==
- List of female film and television directors
- List of LGBT-related films directed by women
