= Caroline Azar =

Canadian punk rock singer

Caroline Azar is a director and playwright. She was the lead singer, keyboardist and co-lyricist/composer of the band Fifth Column.

== Career ==
The all-women punk band Fifth Column began in the mid-1980s in Toronto, Ontario, Canada. The band self-released two albums, To Sir With Hate and All-Time Queen Of The World.

Azar has acted in a number of stage productions, including The Molly Murders by Anthony Furey, for which she was selected "Outstanding Performer" by Now Magazine.

She worked as directorial assistant for the Judith Thompson productions of Perfect Pie, Habitat, Capture Me and Body and Soul, story editor, and dramaturg for other writers, Azar has also written several plays, including Satan's Mistress, The Surreal Detective vs John Nothing and Man-O-Rexic. Man-O-Rexic featured songs written by Azar and recorded with Fifth Column alumni G. B. Jones and Beverly Breckenridge along with Joel Gibb of The Hidden Cameras.

In 2012, a documentary film by Kevin Hegge, called She Said Boom: The Story of Fifth Column was released featuring interviews with band members Caroline Azar, G.B. Jones, and Beverly Breckenrige, with commentary on the influence of Fifth Column by Kathleen Hanna and Bruce LaBruce.

Azar launched her live workshop production of 'Dink' at The Next Stage Theatre Festival in downtown Toronto at The Factory Theatre in January 2015, starring the broadway stage star David Keeley. The show received mixed reviews.

== Films ==
- She Said Boom: The Story of Fifth Column directed by Kevin Hegge (2012)
- She's Real directed by Lucy Thane (1997)
- Donna, video for Fifth Column, directed by Friday Myers (1994)
- Airplane On The Highway video for Bob Wiseman, directed by Caroline Azar (1994)
- The Yo-Yo Gang directed by G.B. Jones (1992)
- No Skin Off My Ass directed by Bruce LaBruce (1991)
- Like This video for Fifth Column, directed by Bruce LaBruce and Fifth Column (1990)
- The Troublemakers directed by G.B. Jones (1990)

== Discography ==
(For Fifth Column recordings, see Fifth Column)

- Apple Strudel Man, Jolly Tambourine Man (1984)
- It's A Wonderful Record!, Shadowy Men on a Shadowy Planet (1994)
- Kickstand, Kickstand (Queenie) (1994)
- Messing With Greek Buck, Greek Buck (1998)
- Bucquiem, Greek Buck (2003)
- Mississauga Goddam, The Hidden Cameras (2004)
