= Deadline (1980 film) =

- Promotional release poster
- Directed by: Mario Azzopardi
- Written by: Mario Azzopardi
- Produced by: Henry Less
- Starring: Stephen Young; Sharon Masters
- Cinematography: Manfred Guthe
- Release date: 1980
- Running time: 90 minutes
- Country: Canada
- Language: English

Deadline (also known as Anatomy of a Horror) is a 1980 (Note: The earliest known verifiable listing of the film's release year dates it to around 1980. This is the year listed by the film's current distributor, Vinegar Syndrome. See the Release section for details.) Canadian horror film directed and co-written by Mario Azzopardi and starring Stephen Young and Sharon Masters.

== Cast ==
- Stephen Young as Steven Lessey
- Sharon Masters as Elizabeth Lessey
- Marvin Goldhar as Burt Horowitz
- Jeannie Elias as Darlene Winters
- Cindy Hinds as Sharon Lessey
- Phillip Leonard as Philip Lessey
- Tod Woodcroft as David Lessey
- Bev Marsh as Martha Lessey

== Release ==
The earliest known verifiable listing of the film's release year is in the publication Horror and Science Fiction Films II by Donald C. Willis, copyrighted in 1982; in it, the film's release year is listed as "1980?". Home video distributor Vinegar Syndrome lists the film's release year with more certainty as 1980. Several other sources list the film's release year as 1980. In a 1985 volume of The Motion Picture Guide, the film's release date is listed as 1984. However, according to Canadian Film and Video: A Bibliography and Guide to the Literature, published in 1997, the film was released in 1979.

== Home media ==
The film was released on Blu-ray and DVD by Vinegar Syndrome in March 2020.
