= Rough Trade (band) =

Canadian rock band

- Also known as: O (1968–1970); The Bullwhip Brothers (1970–1974)
- Origin: Toronto, Ontario, Canada
- Genres: Dance rock; art punk; new wave; folk (early)
- Years active: 1968–1988
- Label: True North
- Past members: Carole Pope; Kevan Staples (deceased); JoAnn Brooks (deceased); Michael Fonfara (deceased); Rick Gratton; Hap Roderman; John Lang; Marv Kanarek; Luci Martin-Keyes; Sharon Smith; Jane Cessine; Bucky Berger; Patricia Cullen (deceased); Terry Wilkins; David McMorrow; Howard Ayee; Tony Springer; Tony Craig

Rough Trade (1968–1988) was a Canadian rock band centred on singer Carole Pope and multi-instrumentalist Kevan Staples. The band was noted for their provocative lyrics and stage antics; singer Pope often performed in bondage attire, and their 1981 hit "High School Confidential" was one of the first explicitly lesbian-themed Top 40 hits in the world.

== Biography ==
=== Early years (1968–1979) ===
The first iteration of the band was formed in 1968, in Toronto, when Carole Pope (vocals, guitars) and Kevan Staples (keyboards, guitars) began performing in a folk group known as "O". Their musical partner in this venture was Clive Smith. In 1970, Smith left the group, and Pope and Staples changed their name to "The Bullwhip Brothers", performing as a largely acoustic duo at Toronto art festivals and at private events.

In 1973, the band was renamed Rough Trade, and was joined by percussionist Chris Faulkner, bassist Bob Jennings, and drummer Donny McDougal. As would happen frequently going forward, the players supporting Pope and Staples were subject to sometimes wholesale change, and by 1974, the Pope/Staples duo was joined by Hap Roderman, Jane Cessine, Sharon Smith and Marv Kanarek. The band, through their theatrical combination of rock, R&B and raw sexuality (Pope often performed in bondage attire), became a popular draw on Toronto's live music scene through their regular shows at Grossman's Tavern, in Toronto.

Rough Trade was the first rock band to record a direct to disc album with 1976's Rough Trade Live, which despite the title, was actually a studio recording. Each side was performed all the way through and cut directly to the mastering disc for greater audio fidelity. By this time, the band's line-up was Pope, Staples, JoAnn Brooks (vocals, percussion), Rick Gratton (drums), Michael Fonfara (keyboards, arranger), and Peter Hodgson (bass). As would be the case throughout the band's entire career, the majority of the album's songs were written by Pope and Staples. In the same year, Geoff Travis opened the first Rough Trade record shop in London, reportedly taking the appellation from the band; this eventually led to the formation of the similarly named Rough Trade Records in 1978.

On December 19, 1977, the band presented a newly created live musical called Restless Underwear, which co-starred Divine alongside the band (who by this time had added an additional back-up singer, Luci Martin-Keyes). The show, which played at Toronto's prestigious Massey Hall, was noted for its outrageous (for the time) sexual satire. However, aside from Pope and Staples, the rest of the band quit after Restless Underwear had completed its one-show run in a dispute over payment.

After a six-month layoff, Pope and Staples rebuilt the band, adding David McMorrow, Bucky Berger, Terry Wilkins, Bert Hermiston, Colina Phillips and Betty Richardson to the line-up at various points in 1978 and 1979. The group resumed playing regular Toronto shows, most often at the Horseshoe Tavern. In 1978, Tim Curry would issue a cover of the Rough Trade song "Birds of a Feather", from their 1976 direct to disc album. Pope and Staples were also at the time involved in writing music for film and television soundtracks, and in 1978 they picked up a Genie Award for their work on the made-for-television film One Night Stand.

On February 14, 1980, the band performed their musical revue Restless Underwear at Manhattan's Beacon Theatre. However, the event was promoted by the venue as a show by Divine, who in fact only sang two songs in the revue, both in act two. As a result, the show was received poorly. Later that year, the band line-up was again reshuffled, settling into a stable five-person line-up of Carole Pope (vocals), Kevan Staples (guitars, keyboards, etc.), David McMorrow (keyboards), Terry Wilkins (bass), and Bucky Berger (drums). The band also performed in the Canadian horror film, Deadline, that same year.

=== Commercial peak (1980–1983) ===
The new iteration of Rough Trade landed a record contract with True North Records in mid-1980, and recorded the group's second album Avoid Freud, which was released in October 1980. The official first single was the deliberately controversial "What's the Furor About the Fuhrer?", but radio stations flipped the single over and the B-side "Fashion Victim" became a top 40 hit in Canada.

The controversy surrounding the raunchy lesbian-themed second single "High School Confidential" helped propel the song into the Canadian top 20, and made the band stars.

The band's next album was 1981's For Those Who Think Young. (The title was originally meant to be "For Those Who Think Jung", a play on their earlier Avoid Freud LP as well as a reference to Carl Jung.) Although not as widely remembered as "High School Confidential" today, the LP's first single, the sexually charged "All Touch", was the band's most successful single on the Canadian charts during their career, peaking at no. 12. The release of both "All Touch" and its parent album was delayed by nearly a year in international markets, with "All Touch" peaking in Australia at no. 40 in January 1983 and spending 40 weeks in the Top 100. "All Touch" also became Rough Trade's only U.S. chart hit, peaking at no. 58 in early 1983. Although the song widely was believed to have the potential to break into the top 40, the bankruptcy of the band's American distributor Boardwalk Records halted its progress on the charts as the single ceased to be available in stores.

During the recording of Rough Trade's 1982 album Shaking the Foundations, Wilkins and Berger left and were replaced by Howard Ayee (bass) and Jorn Anderson (drums) as unofficial members. (By this point, the group was explicitly identified in the album credits as simply Pope and Staples, augmented by other musicians as needed on a track-by-track basis.) Shaking the Foundations spawned a top 20 Canadian hit in "Crimes of Passion". Dusty Springfield sang backing vocals on the album, and would also cover two Rough Trade songs that same year on her album White Heat. Many years later, Pope would reveal that she and Springfield were in a relationship around this time.

Pope and Staples also composed a score for the 1982 documentary film Track Two (Enough Is Enough), about the Operation Soap raids of 1981. The score included the song "Endless Night", which was included on Shaking the Foundations.

In 1983, Rough Trade were offered a Pepsi commercial to air in the Canadian market, but the ad was soon pulled from the airwaves as Pepsi had featured people wrapped in bandages and wearing tuxedos and sunglasses similar to Canadian musician Nash the Slash without his permission. The same year, lead singer Pope duetted with Paul Hyde on the Payola$ top 10 Canadian hit "Never Said I Loved You". However, Rough Trade's 1983 album Weapons failed to place a single on the Canadian charts, marking the beginning of the group's commercial decline.

On The Tonight Show with Johnny Carson and Late Night with David Letterman, Martin Short recalled that one of his early performances included being the opening act for Rough Trade in the early 1980s.

=== Winding down (1984–1988) ===
In 1984, the duo of Pope and Staples were paired with new producer Terry Brown, after having previously co-produced all their True North material with Gene Martynec. The duo was supported by session musicians in the studio, including Berger, Wilkins, Ayee, and Anderson, as well as guests such as Dalbello and Neil Chapman of Pukka Orchestra. The band's 1984 album O Tempora! O Mores! spun off two singles that brushed the Canadian top 100, but it would prove to be Rough Trade's final full-length original release.

Rough Trade returned to a stable five person line-up in 1985 for performance purposes, with Pope, Staples and Ayee joined by Tony Springer (guitar) and Tony Craig (drums). This line-up would record a handful of new tracks for the 1985 greatest hits compilation Birds of a Feather. Their final full-scale tour "Deep Six in '86" took place in 1986, although they performed a few local concert dates in Toronto in 1987 and 1988. Around the same time, guitarist Springer changed his stage name to Wild T and found modest fame as a solo artist in Canada.

=== Reunions, solo activity (1989–current) ===
After the final break-up in 1988, Rough Trade performed several reunion shows, with varying personnel supporting Pope and Staples. The first reunion show was in Toronto in December 1994. A handful of one-off shows later took place at various times through the late 1990s and into the next decade, mostly in Toronto. In 1999, playwright Bryden MacDonald staged Shaking the Foundations, a musical revue based on Rough Trade's music at Toronto's Buddies in Bad Times theatre. In 2001, Rough Trade undertook a mini-tour of several venues in eastern Canada.

Since the break-up, Staples busied himself as a composer for film, television and theatre, and lived in Toronto. Pope has issued two EPs, two albums, and several singles; her first full-length solo debut album Transcend was released in 2005, 21 years after her last full-length album with Rough Trade, which was followed by her second album, Landfall, which was released in 2011. Pope continues to play occasional shows across Canada and in Los Angeles and New York City and now lives in West Hollywood.

In 2020, Pope and Staples reunited as Rough Trade to record and issue a new version of "High School Confidential". Though billed as "High School Confidential (Fame Whore Mix)", the track was a completely new recording, rather than a remix.

== Death of band members ==
On March 7, 2019, JoAnn Brooks, backing vocalist and percussionist of the band from 1976 to 1977, died from health complications.

On January 8, 2021, Michael Fonfara, keyboardist and arranger of the band from 1976 to 1978, died following a two-year battle with cancer.

On March 23, 2025, co-founding member, Kevan Staples, died of cancer at the age of 74.

== Members ==
Core members

- Carole Pope – vocals, (1968–1988)
- Kevan Staples – vocals, rhythm guitar, keyboards, synthesizers (1968–1988, died 2025)

Former members

- JoAnn Brooks – vocals, percussion (1976–1977, died 2019)
- John Lang – keyboards, guitar (1976–1977)
- Hap Roderman – bass (1974–1977)
- Marv Kanarek – drums (1974–1976)
- Michael Fonfara – keyboards, arranger(1976–1978, died 2021)
- Peter Hodgson – bass (1975–1977)
- Rick Gratton – drums (1976–1978)
- Luci Martin-Keyes – backing vocals (1977)
- Sharon Smith – keyboards (1974–1975)
- Jane Cessine – percussion (1974–1975)
- Patricia Cullen – keyboards (1974–1976, died 1991)
- Diane Roblin – keyboards (1975)
- John Sheard – keyboards (1978–1979)
- John Capek – keyboards (1975–1976)
- John Hughes – keyboards (1978–1978)
- Jim Norman – drums (1975–1976)
- Peter Goodale – keyboards (1978)
- Fred Mandel – keyboards (1975)
- Terry Wilkins – bass (1978–1982)
- John Adames – drums (1978–1979)
- Bucky Berger – drums (1978–1982)
- David McMorrow – keyboards (1980–1984)
- Howard Ayee – bass (1982–1987)
- Jorn Andersen – drums (1982–1984)
- Chi Sharge – percussion (1983–1984)
- Tony Springer – guitar (1985–1987)
- Tony Craig – drums (1985–1987)

=== Lineups ===
1968–1970	1970–1974	1974–1977
(O): Carole Pope – vocals, guitar; Kevan Staples – keyboards, guitars	(The Bullwhip Brothers): Carole Pope – vocals, guitar; Kevan Staples – keyboards, guitars	(Rough Trade): Carole Pope – vocals; Kevan Staples – vocals, keyboards, guitars; Sharon Smith – keyboards; Patricia Cullen – keyboards; Jane Cessine – percussion; Hap Roderman – bass; Marv Kanarek – drums; Jim Norman – drums
1977	1977–1978	1978–1980
Carole Pope – vocals; Kevan Staples – vocals, keyboards, guitars; JoAnn Brooks – vocals, percussion; Michael Fonfara – keyboards, arranger; Peter Hodgson – bass; Rick Gratton – drums	Carole Pope – vocals; Kevan Staples – vocals, keyboards, guitars; JoAnn Brooks – vocals, percussion; Luci Martin-Keyes – backing vocals; Michael Fonfara – keyboards, arranger; Peter Hodgson – bass; Rick Gratton – drums	Carole Pope – vocals; Kevan Staples – vocals, keyboards, guitars; David McMorrow – keyboards; John Hughes – keyboards; Terry Wilkins – bass; Bucky Berger – drums; John Adames – drums
1980–1982	1982–1983	1983–1984
Carole Pope – vocals; Kevan Staples – vocals, keyboards, guitars; David McMorrow – keyboards; Terry Wilkins – bass; Bucky Berger – drums	Carole Pope – vocals; Kevan Staples – vocals, keyboards, guitars; David McMorrow – keyboards; Howard Ayee – bass; Jorn Andersen – drums	Carole Pope – vocals; Kevan Staples – vocals, keyboards, guitars; David McMorrow – keyboards; Howard Ayee – bass; Jorn Anderson – drums; Chi Sharge – percussion
1985–1988
Carole Pope – vocals; Kevan Staples – vocals, keyboards, guitars; Tony Springer – guitar; Howard Ayee – bass; Tony Craig – drums

== Discography ==
=== Albums ===
Year	Title	Chart positions		
Year	Title	CAN	CANCON	AUS
1976	Rough Trade Live! Direct to Disc	—	—	—
1980	Avoid Freud	19	—	—
1981	For Those Who Think Young	9	1	59
1982	Shaking the Foundations	9	1	96
1983	Weapons	20	—	—
1984	O Tempora! O Mores!	—	—	—
1985	Birds of a Feather: The Best of Rough Trade	—	—	—
2022	Rough Trade: Live 1979-1980	—	—	—

=== Singles ===
Release date	Title	Chart peak				Album
Release date	Title	Canada RPM 100	CANCON	US Hot 100	AUS	Album
1979	"Shakedown"	—	—	—	—	Cruising (Music from the Original Motion Picture Soundtrack)
1980	"Fashion Victim"	25	3	—	—	Avoid Freud
1981	"High School Confidential"	12	1	—	—	Avoid Freud
1981	"All Touch"	12	2	58	40	For Those Who Think Young
1981	"Blood Lust"	—	—	—	—	For Those Who Think Young
1981	"For Those Who Think Young"	—	—	—	—	For Those Who Think Young
1982	"Crimes of Passion"	18	—	—	—	Shaking the Foundations
1983	"Weapons"	—	—	—	—	Weapons
1983	"Deca-Dance"	—	—	—	—	Weapons
1984	"Sexual Outlaw"	92	—	—	—	O Tempora! O Mores!
1985	"On the Line"	91	—	—	—	O Tempora! O Mores!
1985	"Rescue Me"	—	—	—	—	O Tempora! O Mores!
1985	"Birds of a Feather"	—	—	—	—	Birds of a Feather
2020	"High School Confidential (Fame Whore Mix)"	—	—	—	—	Non-album single
