= Terry Wilkins =

- Born: Sydney, New South Wales, Australia
- Genres: Pop, rock
- Occupation: Bass player
- Instrument(s): Electric bass, upright bass
- Years active: 1967–present

Terry Wilkins is an Australian-born Canadian musician, composer and producer.

== Career ==
A native of Sydney, Australia, Wilkins early performances saw him playing guitar in a folk group at University in 1965 (following his graduation from Parramatta Marist High in 1964). Within a couple of years he had dropped out of academia and was drawn towards Taylor Square, Darlinghurst, where in the late 1960s various jug bands, blues, psychedelic, folk, country and other styled ensembles co-existed there for a few years.

Wilkins discovered the bass guitar at this time playing with The Starving Wild Dogs, featuring New Zealander Red McKelvie on guitar, Daryl McKenzie on drums and Wally Mudd singing and playing harmonica. By 1969, they had evolved into The Quill which was more focused on playing original material. They supported country rock band the Flying Circus in September 1969, at a time when that band had just lost their bass player. Wilkins was invited to join Flying Circus and gave them songwriting anilities and vocal harmonies. Red McKelvie was also recruited to the Flying Circus soon after, recording such albums as Prepared In Peace. In 1970, they won the Battle of the Sounds which had become an established launch pad for Australian bands, such as the Masters Apprentices, to travel overseas. The Flying Circus tried to break into the American scene, based in San Francisco, but gigs were hard to find. A connection with the Toronto band, McKenna Mendelson Mainline (who they had met in Australia), steered the Flying Circus further north.

Wilkins remained in Toronto since 1971, and has since worked with many Canadian and international artists from Lighthouse to Big Sugar as well as Rough Trade and David Wilcox. He has also backed many visiting artists such as Dr. John, Eddie Cleanhead Vinson, Maria Muldaur, John Hammond, Levon Helm and Son Seals. His musical range is wide and varied with an emphasis on roots music especially blues and swing with some adventure in Caribbean styles.
