= Lesbians on Ecstasy =

Canadian electronic band

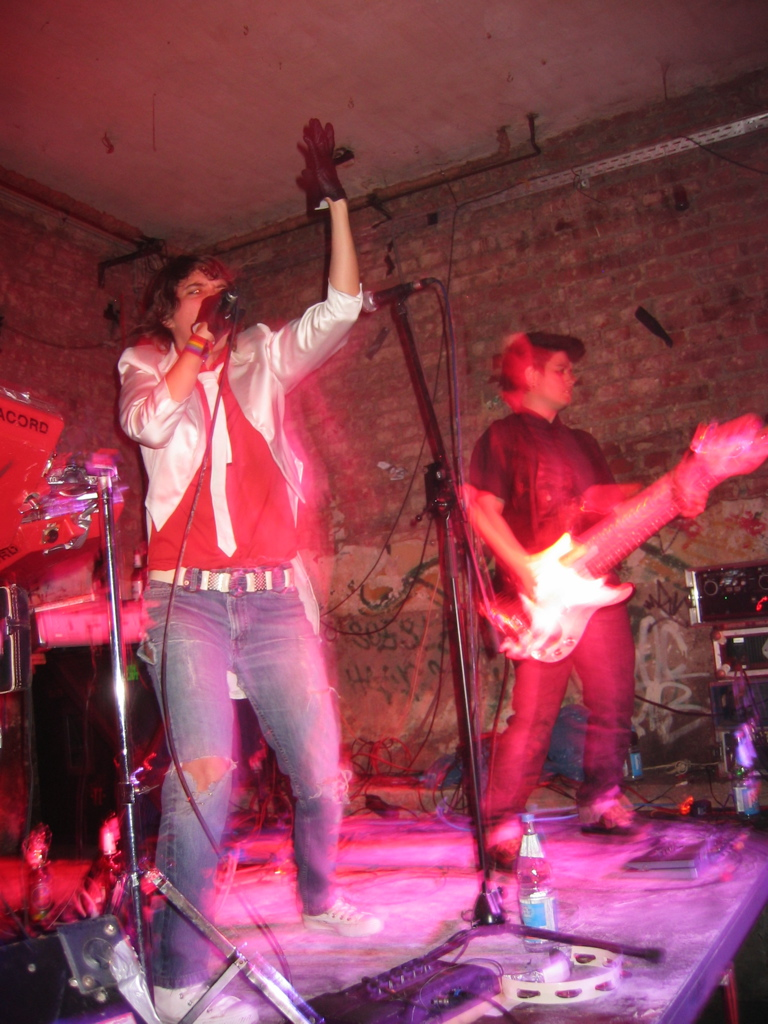

Background information
- Origin: Montreal, Quebec, Canada
- Genres: Electroclash, electropunk, queercore
- Years active: 2003–present
- Label: Alien8 Recording
- Members: Fruity Frankie; Veronique Mystique; Bernie Bankrupt; Pretty Ricky; Both Hands; Jackie "the Jackhammer"; Annagram

Lesbians on Ecstasy is a Canadian electronic band formed in 2003 in Montreal, Quebec.

The band toured across Canada and the U.S. with Le Tigre before the release of their first recording. The first album, the self-titled Lesbians on Ecstasy was released in 2004. In 2005, the song from this recording entitled "Bitchsy", a re-take of the Fifth Column song "All Women Are Bitches", was featured on the TV series Queer as Folk. That same year, Lesbians on Ecstasy was chosen as the "Album of the Year" by U.S. magazine The Advocate.

In the summer of 2005, the band released their follow-up recording Giggles in the Dark, an LP of Lesbians on Ecstasy remixes by Le Tigre, Scream Club, Tracy and the Plastics, Kids on TV (featuring Maggie MacDonald), 1-Speed Bike, DJ AÏ, Jody Bleyle (formerly of Team Dresch), Katastrophe and Sean Kosa. Additional remixes were available for download on the web site by French producer Electrosexual, and Branx. The band's third full-length release, entitled We Know You Know came out in the spring of 2007.

The band's name is a reference to Chicks on Speed.

== Discography ==
=== Albums ===
- 2004: Lesbians on Ecstasy CD, Alien8 Recordings
- 2005: Giggles in the Dark Remix LP, CD, Alien8 Recordings
- 2007: We Know You Know LP, CD, Alien8 Recordings

=== Singles and EPs ===
- 2004: "Tell Me Does She Love The Bass"/"U Feel Love", split 12" with The Unireverse on Total Zero Records

=== MP3 ===
- 2005: Tell Me Does She Love the Bass (Electrosexual remix), Alien8 Recordings

=== Compilations ===
- 2006: "Don't _ with the. aiff" on A Silence Broken, Public Record
