= G. B. Jones =

Canadian artist, filmmaker, musician, and publisher

- Born: 1965 (age 60–61); Bowmanville, Ontario
- Genre: Post-punk
- Occupations: Musician, artist, filmmaker
- Instruments: Vocals, guitar, drums
- Years active: 1980s–present

G. B. Jones (born 1965) is a Canadian artist, filmmaker, musician, and publisher of zines. She is best known for producing the queer punk zine J.D.s and her Tom Girls drawings.

== Career ==
=== Music ===
Jones' musical career began as a young child, singing Canadian folk songs in the school choir. Though she didn't have enough money to buy records, her uncle was very involved in the folk music community and exposed her to a musical education that would prove valuable later on. From the early 1980s to the late 1990s, Jones performed with the all-woman post-punk band Fifth Column, playing drums, guitar and background vocals, and was one of the co-founders of the group. The band's first album, To Sir With Hate was released in 1985. In 2002, Fifth Column's last release, Imbecile, appeared on the Kill Rock Stars compilation album Fields and Streams.

=== Artwork and publications ===
Jones initially received recognition for her Tom Girls drawings, which were published in the queer punk fanzine J.D.s, founded by Jones and co-published with Bruce LaBruce.

==== Themes ====
In an interview with Xtra Toronto, Jones shares, "I was interested in certain issues that I don't think many people may have picked up on in the work, ideas about authority figures, power, obviously, and the abuse of power, and gender roles as they pertain to both sexes. I think there's been a tendency to take a very reductivist view of the work as simply erotic and kind of dismiss that there could be any other concerns involved."

According to Dodie Bellamy, G. B. Jones "co-opts the male-on-male objectifying gaze of gay erotica and converts it to a female-on-female gaze" and herTom Girls series of drawings (based on the work of Tom of Finland) are "unapologetic, thrillingly anti-assimilationist." Jones gives her marginalized female characters a place to reclaim their power. By changing the narrative, Jones's drawings allow viewers to compare the effect of women in those positions of authority versus the men.

== Queercore ==
Jones coined the term "homocore" with LaBruce to cater to the social mutants of the underground. It later evolved into "queercore" to be more inclusive.

== Exhibition history ==
Jones has exhibited her art nationally and internationally since the early 1990s, in spaces such as Columbus Museum of Art, Columbus; Participant Inc., New York; Mercer Union, Toronto; The Power Plant, Toronto; Kunsthalle Exnergasse, Vienna; White Columns, New York; AKA Artist Run Space, Winnipeg; Muncher Kunstverein, Munich; and Schwules Museum, Berlin. Her first gallery was Feature Inc. in New York, curated by Hudson, who was the first art dealer to showcase her Tom Girls series of drawings from 1991 to 1999.

== Filmography ==
=== Director ===
- The Troublemakers, directed by G. B. Jones (1990)
- The Yo-Yo Gang, directed by G. B. Jones (1992)
- The Lollipop Generation, directed by G. B. Jones (2008)

=== Actor ===
- Fifth Column at the Funnel, directed by John Porter (1982)
- Boy, Girl, directed by Bruce LaBruce (1987)
- Bruce and Pepper Wayne Gacy's Home Movies, directed by Bruce LaBruce and Candy Parker (1988)
- Like This, music video for Fifth Column, directed by Bruce LaBruce and Fifth Column (1990)
- No Skin Off My Ass, directed by Bruce LaBruce (1991)
- Donna, music video for Fifth Column, directed by Friday Myers (1994)
- She's Real, directed by Lucy Thane (1997)
- I Believe in the Good of Life, music video for The Hidden Cameras, directed by Joel Gibb, (2005)
- She Said Boom: The Story of Fifth Column, directed by Kevin Hegge, (2012)
- Queercore: How to Punk a Revolution, directed by Yony Leyser, (2017)

== See also ==
- J.D.s
- List of female film and television directors
- List of LGBT-related films directed by women
