= Kevin Hegge =

Canadian documentary filmmaker

Kevin Hegge is a Canadian documentary filmmaker based in Toronto, Ontario, who specializes in films about social and musical subcultures. He is most noted for his film She Said Boom: The Story of Fifth Column, which was the winner of the award for Best Canadian Film at the 2012 Inside Out Film and Video Festival.

In addition to his own films, he has also worked as an assistant director on Pavan Moondi's narrative films Diamond Tongues and Sundowners, and has been a writer for Now.

His second feature documentary, Tramps!, centred on the New Romantic scene of the early 1980s. The film premiered as the closing gala film at BFI Flare in 2022, and had its Canadian premiere at Inside Out.

He is out as gay.
