= Greek Buck =

Canadian musical duo

- Also known as: Barely Pink
- Origin: Canada
- Years active: 1997–2003
- Label: Glop
- Spinoff of: Shadowy Men on a Shadowy Planet, Phono-Comb
- Members: Don Pyle; Andrew Zealley

Greek Buck were a Canadian musical duo, consisting of Don Pyle (formerly of Shadowy Men on a Shadowy Planet and Phono-Comb) and Andrew Zealley. They are best known for "Spunk", the theme song to the American television series Queer as Folk.

== History ==
Originally billed as Barely Pink, Pyle and Zealley changed their name to Greek Buck in 1998.

In 2000, Greek Buck released a five-song EP, Bucquiem. Kevan Byrne and Kevin Lynn of King Cobb Steelie, as well as singer Caroline Azar, joined Pyle and Zealley. Their song "Spunk" was used as the theme song for the first three seasons of Queer as Folk, and was included on original television soundtrack album for the show.

Pyle and Zealley also composed the scores to several films by John Greyson (including Proteus, The Law of Enclosures and the short films This is Nothing and Herr), Sarah Polley (I Shout Love) and Wrik Mead (Fruit Machine, Hoolboom, Camp). CD releases of the soundtracks were billed as "Don Pyle + Andrew Zealley" to set them apart from the other Greek Buck releases.

In 2002, the duo released an EP, No Time.

Greek Buck also recorded with Ian Blurton, Joel Gibb, Sandro Perri, and actress Sarah Polley.

Zealley has also worked as a film and television composer separately from Pyle, was a member of the synth-pop band TBA with Glenn Schellenberg, Paul Hackney and Steven Bock in the 1980s, and has been a remixer for electronic music artists under the name PSBEUYS.

== Discography ==
=== Barely Pink ===
- '"Black Vinyl" / "Litho Star" (1997) (vinyl single)
- Lrg-n^{ss}10 (Galerie Largeness Installment No. Ten) (1997) (cassette EP)

=== Greek Buck ===
- Messin' With Greek Buck (1998) (vinyl only)
- Bucquiem (2000)
- No Time (2002) (CD EP)

=== Don Pyle + Andrew Zealley ===
- The Law of Enclosures (2001) (original soundtrack)
- Proteus (2003) (original soundtrack)
