= Jay Scott =

Canadian film critic

Jeffrey Scott Beaven (October 4, 1949 – July 30, 1993), known professionally by his pen name Jay Scott, was a Canadian film critic.

== Early life ==
Scott was born in Lincoln, Nebraska, and was raised in Albuquerque, New Mexico, as a Seventh-Day Adventist, whose doctrine virtually prohibited movies. Scott studied art history at New College of Florida in Sarasota, and later took acting classes at the University of New Mexico.

== Career ==
Moving to Canada in 1969 as a draft evader, he settled in Calgary and began writing film reviews for the Calgary Albertan a few years later. He won a National Newspaper Award in 1975 for a review of Theatre Passe Muraille's stage production The Alberta Cowboy Show, and moved to Toronto when he was hired by The Globe and Mail in 1977. With The Globe and Mail, he wrote an entertainment gossip column for his first year, before transferring to become a film reviewer.

With the Globe and Mail, Scott became Canada's most influential film critic, winning two more National Newspaper Awards for his writing, and is still widely remembered as one of the best and most influential film critics in the history of Canadian journalism. He has also been credited as the catalyst for a major shift in the Globe's arts reporting style in his era, from a staid reportorial style toward more distinctive colourful writing.

He was also the host of Jay Scott's Film International, a film series on TVOntario, and published three non-fiction books on film and art: Midnight Matinees, Changing Woman: The Life and Art of Helen Hardin, and The Prints of Christopher Pratt.

From 1967 to 1980, he was in a relationship with Mary Bloom, whom he met while studying in Sarasota. After his divorce from Bloom, he came out as gay and began a relationship with Gene Corboy. He was diagnosed with HIV in 1986.

== Death ==
He died of AIDS-related causes in 1993. He wrote for the Globe and Mail until his death, and had been working on a book about Norman Jewison. On the night of his death, TVOntario cancelled a scheduled rerun of Film International to broadcast a tribute to Scott, including a screening of one of his favorite films, Jean-Luc Godard's Breathless.

Roger Ebert eulogized Scott as a "supremely well-informed critic who was able to translate his knowledge into superb prose that transmitted his passion for the movies." Clint Eastwood sent an unsolicited $5,000 donation to Toronto's Casey House AIDS hospice in Scott's memory. At the 1993 Toronto International Film Festival, filmmaker John Greyson dedicated his Special Jury Citation for Zero Patience to Scott's memory.

== Legacy ==
A collection of his reviews, Great Scott! The Best of Jay Scott's Movie Reviews, was published posthumously in 1994; proceeds from the book sales were donated to the Canadian Foundation for AIDS Research.

In 2009, the Toronto Film Critics Association established an annual award for emerging talent in the Canadian film industry, the Jay Scott Prize, in Scott's memory. The winner of the award receives $10,000.

He is the subject of an essay, written by Globe and Mail film critic Barry Hertz, in the 2024 book A Nation’s Paper: The Globe and Mail in the Life of Canada.
