= Sport Fishin': The Lure of the Bait, The Luck of the Hook =

Studio album by Shadowy Men on a Shadowy Planet
- Released: June 25, 1993
- Recorded: Chicago Recording Company, Chicago, Illinois
- Genre: Surf rock
- Length: 49:40
- Label: Cargo Records
- Producer: Shadowy Men on a Shadowy Planet

Shadowy Men on a Shadowy Planet chronology
Dim the Lights, Chill the Ham (1991)	Sport Fishin': The Lure of the Bait, The Luck of the Hook (1993)

Professional ratings
Review scores
Source	Rating
AllMusic	4/5 stars
The Encyclopedia of Popular Music	4/5 stars

Sport Fishin': The Lure of the Bait, The Luck of the Hook is the second album by Canadian surf rock group Shadowy Men on a Shadowy Planet, released in 1993 through Cargo Records. It was recorded by Steve Albini.

The album was reissued in 2016, with bonus tracks recorded with Fred Schneider.

== Critical reception ==
Trouser Press called the album "incrementally more diverse in its creative ambitions" than the band's previous releases. The Encyclopedia of Popular Music deemed it "excellent" and "a lean and dirty-sounding record."

== Track listing ==
All tracks are written by Shadowy Men on a Shadowy Planet, except "Mecca" by John Gluck Jr. and Neval Nader

No.	Title	Length
1.	"Unwatchable"	0:11
2.	"Spend a Night, Not a Fortune"	0:44
3.	"Three Piece Suit"	2:22
4.	"Fortune Tellin' Chicken"	1:32
5.	"(Relax) You Will Think You Are a Chicken"	2:57
6.	"Plastics For 500, Bob"	1:45
7.	"That Wuz Ear Me Callin' a Horse"	2:53
8.	"The Singing Cowboy"	1:21
9.	"Farbs"	2:52
10.	"Spy School Graduation Theme"	2:33
11.	"Cheese in the Fridge"	4:02
12.	"Unwatchable"	0:12
13.	"Mecca"	1:55
14.	"Haig Earl"	1:02
15.	"Algoma Reflections"	2:56
16.	"We're Not a Fucking Surf Band"	0:27
17.	"Peas Porridge Rock"	1:27
18.	"Honey, You're Wasting Ammo"	3:39
19.	"They Don't Call Them Chihuahuas Anymore"	2:25
20.	"Off Our Back Conrad Black"	1:10
21.	"We'll Be Right Back!"	1:20
22.	"What I Like About Grease"	2:15
23.	"Memories of Gay Paree"	1:47
24.	"Babywetsitself"	5:53

== Personnel ==
Shadowy Men on a Shadowy Planet

- Brian Connelly – guitar, keyboards
- Reid Diamond – bass guitar
- Don Pyle – drums

Production and additional personnel

- Steve Albini – recording
- Ormond Jobin – recording on "Spend a Night, Not a Fortune" and "Honey You're Wasting Ammo"
