= Dim the Lights, Chill the Ham =

Studio album by Shadowy Men on a Shadowy Planet
- Released: 1991
- Studios: Reaction, Toronto, Ontario, Canada
- Genre: Instrumental rock
- Length: 40:31
- Label: Cargo
- Producer: Coyote Shivers

Shadowy Men on a Shadowy Planet chronology
| Savvy Show Stoppers (1988) | Dim the Lights, Chill the Ham (1991) | Sport Fishin': The Lure of the Bait, The Luck of the Hook (1993) |

Dim the Lights, Chill the Ham is the debut album by Canadian surf rock group Shadowy Men on a Shadowy Planet, released in 1991 through Cargo Records.

== Critical reception ==
Professional ratings
Review scores
| Source | Rating |
|---|---|
| AllMusic | 4/5 stars |
| Calgary Herald | B |

The Gazette wrote that "guitarist Brian Connelly spins through a library of Ventures/beach blanket guitar figures at least as fun as their Mad Magazine titles." The Toronto Star said that "the guitars are still pure Ventures and Shadows—save for a surprisingly restrained version of Brian Wilson's 'In My Room'—and the keyboards are as cheesy as hell, but no party should be without this."

== Track listing ==
All tracks are written by Shadowy Men on a Shadowy Planet, except where noted.

| No. | Title | Length |
|---|---|---|
| 1. | "Dim the Lights, Chill the Ham" | 0:50 |
| 2. | "Reid's Situation" | 1:18 |
| 3. | "I Know a Guy Named Larry" (contains an interpolation of "Sing, Sing, Sing" by Louis Prima) | 1:19 |
| 4. | "Exit from Vince Lombardi High School" | 1:30 |
| 5. | "Aunt's Invasion" | 1:52 |
| 6. | "Running Meredith" | 2:11 |
| 7. | "Bang Bang" (writer: Sonny Bono) | 2:00 |
| 8. | "Hot Box Car" | 1:33 |
| 9. | "In My Room" (writers: Gary Usher, Brian Wilson) | 2:14 |
| 10. | "Dewy Drops of Spring" | 0:22 |
| 11. | "5 American 6 Canadian" | 1:26 |
| 12. | "Who Painted Whistler's Mother" | 2:16 |
| 13. | "Case of the Missing Lady Fingers" | 2:02 |
| 14. | "Jackpot" | 2:01 |
| 15. | "D. Tour" | 1:53 |
| 16. | "Hunter S. Thompson's Younger Brother" | 1:54 |
| 17. | "Misogomy & the Object" | 2:12 |
| 18. | "Ben Hur Picked Off in a Gazebo" | 0:54 |
| 19. | "Who's Afraid of Alison Hymer/Wow Flutter Hiss" | 3:24 |
| 20. | "You Spin Me Round '86" | 1:56 |
| 21. | "Babakganoosh" | 1:52 |
| 22. | "Siesta Cinema" | 2:50 |
| 23. | "Dim the Lights, Chill the Ham" (Reprise) | 0:48 |

CD issue
| No. | Title | Length |
|---|---|---|
| 24. | "Thanks for Buying Our CD" | 0:52 |
| 25. | "Shakin' All Over" | 0:26 |

== Personnel ==
Shadowy Men on a Shadowy Planet

- Brian Connelly – guitar, keyboards
- Reid Diamond – bass guitar
- Don Pyle – drums

Production and additional personnel

- Derek Von Essen – photography
- Ormond Jobin – recording
- Coyote Shivers – mixing, production
