= Damon D'Oliveira =

Canadian actor and film producer

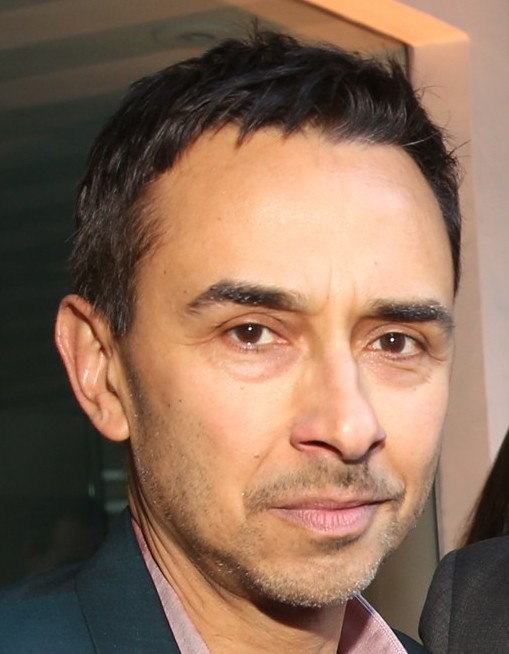
- Damon D'Oliveira, March 2017
- Born: Guyana
- Occupations: Actor, film producer
- Years active: 1980s–present
- Known for: Rude, Love Come Down, The Book of Negroes
- Spouse: Maxime Desmons

Damon D'Oliveira is a Canadian actor and film and television producer, best known as a partner with Clement Virgo in the production firm Conquering Lion Pictures.

In September 2023, he was named chairman of the Canadian Media Producers Association.

== Background ==
Originally from Guyana, D'Oliveira moved to Canada in 1976. He had acting roles in stage, film and television in the 1980s, and was credited as an associate producer on Darrell Wasyk's 1990 film H, before being admitted into the Canadian Film Centre's program for filmmakers of colour in 1991 alongside classmates including Virgo, Robert Adetuyi, Mina Shum and Stephen Williams.

== Producing career ==
His first film production credit was on Virgo's 1993 short film Save My Lost Nigga Soul. He has since been a producer of Virgo's films Rude, Love Come Down, Lie with Me, Poor Boy's Game and The Book of Negroes, as well as John Greyson's films The Law of Enclosures and Proteus. Rude and Love Come Down were both Genie Award nominees for Best Picture.

As an actor, D'Oliveira's roles have included voice roles in Rupert, Chilly Beach, Monster Force, Tales from the Cryptkeeper and Donkey Kong Country, guest roles in Adderly, Neon Rider, Night Heat, War of the Worlds, Street Legal, Side Effects, Due South, TekWar, Forever Knight, Traders, The City, Queer as Folk, Show Me Yours, ZOS: Zone of Separation and The Border, and the films Uncut, Getting Away with Murder and Bollywood/Hollywood.

In 2023, he was awarded the inaugural Trailblazer Award, in honour of his work as a pioneering BIPOC filmmaker, as part of the Toronto International Film Festival Amplify Voices Award slate.

== Personal life ==
Openly gay, he is married to film director and screenwriter Maxime Desmons.

== Filmography ==
=== Producer ===
- 1993: Save My Lost Nigga Soul
- 1995: Rude
- 2000: Love Come Down
- 2000: The Law of Enclosures
- 2003: Proteus
- 2005: Lie with Me
- 2007: Poor Boy's Game
- 2008: Bonne mère (Short)
- 2008: Baggage (Short)
- 2009: Somebody Is Watching Us (Short)
- 2010: Subway Harmonies (Short)
- 2011: Au plus proche (Short)
- 2014: What We Have
- 2015: The Book of Negroes (TV Mini-Series)
- 2018: The Grizzlies
- 2021: Wildhood
- 2022: Brother
- 2025: Steal Away

=== Actor ===
==== Film ====
- 1988: Short Circuit 2 – "Bones"
- 1990: Deep Sleep – Angel
- 1994: Exotica – David / Man at Opera
- 1994: Back in Action – Gantry
- 1994: Trial by Jury – Rafael, Juror
- 1995: Jungleground – 'Blackjack'
- 1996: Getting Away with Murder – Electronic Salesman
- 1996: Bogus – Office Worker
- 1997: Uncut – Peter Denham
- 1997: My Teacher Ate My Homework – Doctor
- 1998: Double Take – Raul
- 1999: The Five Senses – Todd
- 1999: Angel in a Cage – Lucio
- 2001: Full Disclosure – Marek
- 2001: Glitter – Movie Producer
- 2002: Bollywood/Hollywood – Stevie Sood
- 2004: New York Minute – News Broadcaster

==== Television ====
Damon D'Oliveira television acting credits
Year	Title	Role	Notes	Ref.
1992	Counterstrike	Hassif	Episode: "D.O.A."	
1997–2000	Donkey Kong Country	Funky Kong / Eddie, The Mean Old Yeti (voice)		
1998	La Femme Nikita	Sarris	1 episode	
1998	Earth: Final Conflict	Sahjit Jinnah	3 episodes	
2001	Earth: Final Conflict	Perez	Episode: "Dark Horizons" (S4.E21)	
2002	Earth: Final Conflict	Rashid	Episode: "Grave Danger" (S5.E15)	
2008	Chilly Beach: The Canadian President	Constable Al (voice)		
2018	72 Hours	Ravi	Episode: "Burning Obsession" (S1.E1)	
