= Savvy Show Stoppers =

Compilation album by Shadowy Men on a Shadowy Planet
- Released: 1988
- Recorded: 1985–1988
- Genre: Surf rock
- Length: 29:52
- Label: Glass
- Producer: Shadowy Men on a Shadowy Planet, Coyote Shivers

Shadowy Men on a Shadowy Planet chronology
Savvy Show Stoppers (1988)	Dim the Lights, Chill the Ham (1991)

Professional ratings
Review scores
Source	Rating
Allmusic	4.5/5 stars

Savvy Show Stoppers is a compilation album by Shadowy Men on a Shadowy Planet, released in 1988 through Glass Records.

== Track listing ==
Side one
No.	Title	Length
1.	"Good Cop Bad Cop"	2:31
2.	"Musical Interlude"	1:08
3.	"Theme From T.V."	1:26
4.	"Zombie Compromise"	2:11
5.	"Malfunction"	0:28
6.	"Shake Some Evil"	2:50
7.	"You Spin Me Round '86"	2:08
8.	"Run Chicken Run"	1:40

Side two
No.	Title	Length
1.	"Bennett Cerf"	1:36
2.	"Egypt Texas"	2:29
3.	"Customized"	2:22
4.	"Our Weapons Are Useless"	2:32
5.	"Shadowy Countdown"	0:47
6.	"Harlem by the Sea"	1:54
7.	"Having an Average Weekend"	3:58

CD issue
No.	Title	Length
16.	"Misty"	1:15
17.	"Summer Wind"	2:09
18.	"Big Baby"	3:01

== Personnel ==
Shadowy Men on a Shadowy Planet

- Brian Connelly – guitar, keyboards
- Reid Diamond – bass guitar
- Don Pyle – drums

Production and additional personnel

- Shadowy Men on a Shadowy Planet – production
- Coyote Shivers – production
