= The Making of Monsters =

- Film poster
- Directed by: John Greyson
- Written by: John Greyson
- Produced by: Laurie Lynd
- Starring: Christopher Anderson; Stewart Arnott; Lee MacDougall
- Edited by: Miume Jan
- Music by: Glenn Schellenberg
- Production company: Canadian Film Centre
- Release date: 1991 (Berlin)
- Running time: 35 minutes
- Country: Canada
- Language: English

The Making of Monsters is a 1991 Canadian short film, directed by John Greyson. Made while Greyson was a student at the Canadian Film Centre, the film's premise is that playwright and poet Bertolt Brecht is alive and living in Toronto, and actively interfering with the production of "Monsters", a heavily sanitized movie of the week about the 1985 death of Kenneth Zeller in a gaybashing attack.

The film premiered at the 1991 Berlin International Film Festival, and was later screened at the 1991 Toronto International Film Festival and other selected LGBT film festivals, including Vancouver's Out on Screen, Montreal's Image+Nation and Edmonton's The Voice and the Vision.

== Cast ==
The film's cast includes Lee MacDougall as the film within a film's version of Zeller, while the roles of Brecht and Kurt Weill are played by talking fish. The cast also includes Christopher Anderson and Stewart Arnott.

== Controversy ==
Following its initial run on the film festival circuit, the film remained unavailable for many years due to copyright issues, as Warner-Chappell, the holder of the rights to Weill's songs, obtained a court injunction against the use of a "Mack the Knife" parody with different lyrics in the film even though parodies are fully legal under fair use provisions. Warner-Chappell had originally approved the use, but changed their mind after learning that the film contained gay content; even after Weill's songs passed into the public domain in 2001, Warner-Chappell continued to use legal threats to block public screenings of the film, even preventing it from being included in the 2012 Greyson retrospective at the Art Gallery of Ontario.

The film has, however, been screened in some university film studies courses without incident. The issue also influenced the copyright-related themes of Greyson's later feature film Uncut.

== Accolades ==
At Berlin, the film won a Jury Prize from the Teddy Award program. The film won the Toronto International Film Festival Award for Best Canadian Short Film at the 1991 Toronto International Film Festival.
