= Uncut (film) =

- Directed by: John Greyson
- Written by: John Greyson
- Produced by: John Greyson
- Starring: Michael Achtman; Matthew Ferguson; Damon D'Oliveira
- Cinematography: Kim Derko
- Edited by: Dennis Day
- Music by: Andrew Zealley
- Distributed by: Millivres
- Release date: November 1997
- Running time: 92 mins
- Country: Canada
- Language: English

Uncut is a 1997 Canadian docudrama film written and directed by John Greyson.

Set in Ottawa in 1979, the film stars Matthew Ferguson as Peter Cort, a researcher writing a book on male circumcision, and Michael Achtman as Peter Koosens, his typist who has a sexual obsession with Canadian Prime Minister Pierre Trudeau and regularly doctors photographs to depict himself and Trudeau in romantic entanglements.

They later meet Peter Denham (Damon D'Oliveira), a video artist and musician who sets his films to Jackson Five songs. After Denham inserts photographs of Koosens and Trudeau into one of his videos, the three are arrested for copyright violation by an opera-singing police officer, put on trial in a courtroom scene set to La Habanera, and sent to a prison boot camp.

The film is also intercut with documentary footage of artists such as John Oswald, A. A. Bronson, Linda Griffiths and Thomas Waugh discussing censorship, as well as Trudeau himself invoking martial law during the 1970 October Crisis.

The film was inspired in part by the then emerging debate about outing closeted LGBT people, while the copyright themes were inspired by Greyson's battle with the estate of Kurt Weill over the use of parody versions of Weill songs in his early short film The Making of Monsters.

== Cast ==
- Michael Achtman as Peter Koosens
- Matthew Ferguson as Peter Cort
- Damon D'Oliveira as Peter Denham
- Maria Reidstra as Officer
- Alexandra Webb as Defense Lawyer
- Helene Ducharme as Judge
- Daniel MacIvor as Newscaster
- David Roche as Joe Typist
- Shaftiq Ettienne as Fred Typist

== Plot ==
In 1979 Ottawa, a young gay man, Peter Cort, goes to an office on the rooftop of a building. There he meets Peter Koosens, a typist, who he hires to type his book about circumcision, titled “The Psychosexual Meanings of Circumcision and the Foreskin.” As the two Peters’ dictation session ends for the day, a police officer arrives to speak to Koosens. She asks Koosens about letters he has written and mailed to Trudeau. His answers indicate that the two do not know each other, and that Trudeau does not respond to these letters. She reads the letters, which reveal Koosens’ sexual fascination with the prime minister.

Later, Koosens sits by himself in a largely empty gay bar, miming typing on the table. Another man, Peter Denham, sits at a table next to him. The two start to communicate by tapping on the table as if it is a typewriter. After a flirtatious exchange, they go to Koosens’ apartment together, where Denham notes Koosens’ framed pictures of Trudeau, including one where he has made it appear as if he and Trudeau are together. As they kiss on the bed, they discuss rumours about Trudeau’s sexuality. Koosens puts on a tape of Trudeau, and the two men begin having sex.

The tape that Koosens is watching transitions into documentary footage, detailing Trudeau’s bill in 1967 to liberalize laws around abortion, divorce, and homosexuality, then his use of the War Measures Act during the October Crisis in 1970.

While continuing work on typing Cort’s book, Cort suggests a stressed Koosens take a break for lunch. Later that day, Koosens returns home to find Denham, who has taken all of his pictures of Trudeau for a secret project, but is now returning them. Upset, Koosens tells Denham to leave.

Denham returns to the gay bar, where he meets Cort. Denham has an array of beer bottles, each with a different amount of liquid in it, such that each one plays one note on the scale when Denham taps it. He communicates his interest in Cort through messages spelled by the letter names for the notes he plays. Cort is also interested in Denham, but declines to go home with him.

Another day, Denham and Cort meet again at the bar. This time, they do return to Denham’s apartment, where Cort compliments the decoration, mirroring Denham’s conversation with Koosens at his apartment. Denham films Cort as they kiss, and Cort leaves.

On a different night, while Cort and Koosens work on the book, Denham calls them to invite them to the bar. Since Koosens and Cort are unable to hear him over the bar’s loud music, Denham communicates through typing on the phone’s buttons. Cort and Koosens join him at the bar, where he shows them his music video on TV of a cover of the Jackson 5’s “ABC.” The video cuts between Koosens’ doctored images of Trudeau, The Jackson 5, male genitalia, and the footage of Koosens and Cort kissing. Upset at having their intimate moments and artwork taken for use in this video, Koosens and Cort punch Denham. All three are arrested and held for questioning.

It is revealed that Trudeau had a sudden coronary while watching TV, presumably seeing Denham’s video. The Peters’ trial begins. It is sung by the police officer, a judge, and their defense lawyer, in a parodic version of “La Habanera” from Carmen set to lyrics about copyright infringement and the case before them, going through each letter of the alphabet. A jury of snails finds the Peters guilty, and the older men are sentenced to 26 years. Peter Cort is only sentenced to 26 weeks, since he was just an actor.

The three are taken to “an enlightened federal rehabilitation centre” near Ottawa, where they sleep outdoors in a field, use a barn that is converted into a restroom, and another barn that has been converted to a meal hall. They are trained in tasks that violate their fellow prisoners’ privacy including taking samples of their mucus, cleaning and cataloguing the debris left in their books, and analyzing the fibers from their laundry lint.

The night before Peter Cort is scheduled to be released, wracked with guilt over causing Trudeau’s coronary, Peter Koosens circumcises himself. He saves his foreskin for Cort to smuggle out.

In the outside world, Trudeau has been campaigning for another term as Prime Minister, despite the fact that he has been in a coma the entire time. Having been released from the “rehabilitation centre,” Cort goes to the hospital where Trudeau is being treated, and feeds him Koosens’ foreskin. Trudeau makes a miraculous recovery, but Cort is spotted, and is shot dead by a police officer.

When the news gets to Koosens and Denham at the prison, Koosens says that he wishes Trudeau had died instead of Cort.

== Release ==
The film premiered on May 31st, 1997 at Toronto’s Gay and Lesbian Film and Video Festival.
