= Pissoir (film) =

- Directed by: John Greyson
- Written by: John Greyson
- Produced by: John Greyson
- Starring: Paul Bettis; Pauline Carey; Keltie Creed; Lance Eng
- Cinematography: John Greyson; Adam Swica
- Edited by: John Greyson; David McIntosh
- Music by: Glenn Schellenberg
- Release date: 1988
- Running time: 100 minutes
- Country: Canada
- Language: English

Pissoir, retitled Urinal in some countries, was the first feature film directed and released by John Greyson. Released in 1988, the film's central character is an unnamed man who conjures a circle of dead literary and artistic figures, including Sergei Eisenstein, Dorian Gray, Yukio Mishima, Frida Kahlo, and Langston Hughes, to help him formulate a response to police crackdowns on gay sex venues in Toronto, blending fiction with documentary as Greyson also includes quotes from real Canadian journalistic and political figures, including Barbara Amiel and Svend Robinson, about civil liberties and public morality.

The film's cast includes Paul Bettis, Pauline Carey, Lance Eng, and Olivia Rojas.

The film premiered at the 1988 Toronto International Film Festival. It was subsequently screened at the 39th Berlin International Film Festival in 1989, where it won a Teddy Award for Best Essay Film.
