= Mammoth Cave Recording Co. =

Canadian independent record label

Mammoth Cave Recording Co. was a Canadian independent record label, active from 2009 to 2015. Formed in Lethbridge, Alberta by Evan Van Reekum and Paul Lawton, the label later moved to Toronto, Ontario when Lawton moved to that city with his band Ketamines.

The label released new music by artists including Ketamines, The Famines, B.A. Johnston, Needles//Pins and Nervous Talk, as well as reissues by Shadowy Men on a Shadowy Planet and Simply Saucer.

The label announced its closure in February 2015. Its statement announcing the closure stated that the production cost of vinyl albums had become prohibitive, and that they were facing significant backlogs at pressing plants because "the vinyl comeback and Record Store Day disproportionately favour Beatles reissues" over small independent companies.
