= Zero Patience =

1993 musical Canadian film by John Greyson

- Original theatrical poster
- Directed by: John Greyson
- Written by: John Greyson
- Produced by: Louise Garfield; Anna Stratton
- Starring: John Robinson; Normand Fauteux; Dianne Heatherington; Richardo Keens-Douglas; Brenda Kamino; Michael Callen; Marla Lukofsky; Von Flores
- Cinematography: Miroslaw Baszak
- Edited by: Miume Jan
- Music by: Glenn Schellenberg
- Distributed by: Strand Releasing
- Release date: September 11, 1993 (Festival of Festivals)
- Running time: 95 minutes
- Country: Canada
- Languages: English; French

Zero Patience is a 1993 Canadian musical film written and directed by John Greyson. The film examines and refutes the urban legend of the alleged introduction of HIV to North America by a single individual, Gaëtan Dugas. Dugas, better known as Patient Zero, was the target of blame in the popular imagination in the 1980s in large measure because of Randy Shilts's 1987 book And the Band Played On and the 1993 HBO film of the same name chronicling the early days of the AIDS epidemic. Zero Patience tells its story against the backdrop of a romance between a time-displaced Sir Richard Francis Burton and the ghost of "Zero" (the character is not identified by Dugas' name).

Produced in partnership with the Canadian Film Centre, the Canada Council, Telefilm Canada and the Ontario Film Development Corporation, Zero Patience opened to mixed reviews but went on to win a number of prestigious Canadian film awards. The film has been the subject of critical attention in the context of both film theory and queer theory, and is considered part of the informal New Queer Cinema movement.

== Plot summary ==
Victorian adventurer and sexologist Sir Richard Francis Burton (John Robinson), following an "unfortunate encounter" with the Fountain of Youth in 1892, is 170 years old and living in Toronto, Canada. Burton, now living and working as the chief taxidermist at a museum of natural history, is searching for a centerpiece display for an exhibit in his Hall of Contagion. He comes up with the idea of featuring AIDS and the Patient Zero hypothesis. Accepting the popular belief that Zero introduced the virus to North America, Burton sets out to collect video footage from those who knew Zero to support the hypothesis. When Zero's doctor (Brenda Kamino), mother (Charlotte Boisjoli) and former airline colleague Mary (Dianne Heatherington), who is now with ACT UP, all refuse to demonize Zero, Burton manipulates the footage to make it appear as if they do and includes doctored photographs of Zero showing signs of Kaposi's sarcoma. He presents this preliminary version to the press.

The ghost of Zero (Normand Fauteux) materializes at a local gay bathhouse. No one can see or hear him, until Zero runs into Burton while Burton is spying on Zero's friend George. Zero realizes that Burton can see him, although Zero does not show up on Burton's video camera. The two strike a deal; Zero agrees to help Burton with his Patient Zero exhibit if Burton finds a way to make Zero appear.

The two return to the museum where Burton makes a ridiculous attempt to seduce Zero to ensure his participation. Rejecting his advances, Zero examines some of the other exhibits (including displays on Typhoid Mary and the Tuskegee syphilis study) before finding an African green monkey, another suspected early AIDS vector. The monkey (Marla Lukofsky) angrily denounces Zero for scapegoating her just as he has been scapegoated. Zero turns to Burton and they make love.

Under pressure from his director and the exhibit's drug manufacturer sponsor, Burton steals Zero's medical records in hopes of discovering new information. Zero and Burton examine an old blood sample of Zero's under a microscope and discover Miss HIV (Michael Callen), who points out that the original study that was used to label Patient Zero as the first person to bring HIV to North America did not prove any such thing, but instead helped prove that HIV was sexually transmitted, leading to the development of safer sex practices. Under this interpretation, Zero could be lauded as a hero for his candor in participating in that original study. As Burton ponders this, an unknown fluid squirts from the eye pieces of the microscope, drenching Zero and making him appear on video. He joyously declares his innocence on tape but the effect only lasts five minutes before he fades away again. Zero angrily accuses Burton of not caring for him at all and only wanting to use him for the exhibit, then storms out.

Burton fails to complete the revised Patient Zero exhibit before its scheduled opening date. The museum curator substitutes the original presentation instead over Burton's protests, leading to a renewed rush of press scapegoating Zero. The night after the exhibit opens, Mary and other ACT UP members break into the Hall of Contagion and trash the exhibit. Zero returns and Burton explains that he tried to stop the exhibit. Zero forgives Burton but says he wants to disappear again completely. Zero merges with his disfigured video image and, smoking a cigarette inside the video, sets off the fire alarm. The sprinklers destroy the video player and Zero vanishes.

A major subplot involves George (Richardo Keens-Douglas), a French teacher and former intimate of Zero's. George is losing his sight to cytomegalovirus and is taking a drug that is manufactured by a company that, as a member of ACT UP, George is protesting. George struggles through the film to resolve his conflicted feelings over this, his guilt over abandoning Zero during the final days of his illness and his fear that the same thing will happen to him.

== Cast ==
- John Robinson as Sir Richard Burton
- Normand Fauteux as Zero
- Dianne Heatherington as Mary
- Richardo Keens-Douglas as George
- Charlotte Boisjoli as Maman, Zero's mother
- Brenda Kamino as Dr. Cheng, Zero's doctor
- Michael Callen as Miss HIV
- Marla Lukofsky as African Green Monkey
- Von Flores as Ray (ACT UP member)
- Scott Hurst as Michael (ACT UP member)
- Duncan McIntosh as Ross (ACT UP member)

Real-life television journalist Ann Medina has a brief role as a television reporter. Co-producer Louise Garfield makes a cameo appearance playing a virus, co-producer Anna Stratton appears as a drug company executive and composer Glenn Schellenberg plays a bathhouse attendant.

== Production ==
John Greyson became interested in offering a counterpoint to the Patient Zero story as early as 1987, when the Patient Zero meme began entering the public consciousness following the publication of Randy Shilts's book And the Band Played On. The book described the cluster study which led to the popular identification of flight attendant Gaëtan Dugas as the vector through which HIV was first brought to North America. Shilts himself never claimed that Dugas was the first. In early 1991 Greyson was given a development grant for the script from the Canadian Film Centre, of which Greyson is an alumnus. Over the next year Greyson, in collaboration with Film Centre partners Louise Garfield and Anna Stratton, continued to develop the script, eventually presenting it with producer Alexandra Raffé in a workshop format. During the first half of 1992, the production team secured additional development funding from the Canada Council, Telefilm Canada and the Ontario Film Development Corporation. By June of that year the script and the songs were completed and that autumn, with funds from the Telefilm Canada and OFDC grants along with revenue from the sale of British broadcast rights to Channel 4, pre-production and casting got underway. Principal photography began in November 1992 and wrapped after five weeks. Sneak previews took place at the Seattle International Film Festival and a number of LGBT film festivals across the United States before its official debut in September 1993 at Toronto's Festival of Festivals.

In dedicating the film's soundtrack album to performer and AIDS activist Michael Callen and other friends they had lost to the disease, Greyson, composer Glenn Schellenberg and producers Garfield and Stratton explained their reasons for making the film. "We wanted to explode the opportunistic myth of Patient Zero....More importantly, we wanted to celebrate the courage and sass of an international AIDS activist movement that has tirelessly fought for the rights of people living with AIDS."

== Critical reception ==
Zero Patience garnered mixed critical reaction. The Austin Chronicle cited a "murky plot, frequently weak acting and often mediocre music" while still praising the film's "spunk, humor, enthusiasm and wit." The Washington Post compared Zero Patience unfavorably to Hollywood's big-budget, big-star AIDS-themed film, Philadelphia, claiming that the latter's protagonist Andrew Beckett "looked sick, dealt with his illness and allowed the audience to sympathize," unlike the "healthy hoofers" of the musical who, because they didn't look sick enough, "[seem] to deny some of the grim realities" of the disease. In a contrary favorable opinion, London's Time Out Film Guide praised the film for "slyly inverting popular wisdom" to "offer a sassy commentary on the epidemic of blame" and calling Zero Patience "a film which engages your mind as much as your heart, and leaves you laughing." Similarly, The New York Times lauded the film's "loopy buoyancy," praising the songs as a "bouncy stylistic hybrid of Gilbert and Sullivan, Ringo Starr, The Kinks and the Pet Shop Boys."

Zero Patience was honored as the Best Canadian Film and Best Ontario Feature at the 1993 Cinéfest and was awarded a Special Jury Citation as Best Canadian Feature Film at the 1993 Festival of Festivals. Greyson dedicated his award to the memory of Jay Scott, the influential film critic who had died of AIDS a few months earlier. Director Greyson and composer Glenn Schellenberg were nominated for a 1993 Genie Award for Best Original Song for the film's theme song "Zero Patience".

=== Queer theory ===
In examining the film from a queer theory perspective, author Michele Aaron cites Zero Patience as definitional of one of the New Queer Cinema's central attitudes, the "def[iance] of cinematic convention in terms of form, content and genre." Aaron goes on to cite the film's musical format as "further subvert[ing] the ways we might expect to be 'entertained' by such serious matters as AIDS, media representation, and the legacy of moralism and sexuality." Feminist academic and AIDS video producer Alexandra Juhasz puts forth the film as "an effective critique of the silly sensationalism used in much reportage of AIDS science [that] fights melodrama and tabloid journalism—with melodrama and tabloid journalism." Not all such critical commentary has been positive, with openly gay film scholar Robin Wood (who saw the film when someone very close to him was in the final stages of AIDS) calling the film "misguided on the levels both of conception and execution".

== Year-end lists ==
- Top 10 (listed alphabetically, not ranked) – Jimmy Fowler, Dallas Observer

== Soundtrack ==
Zero Patience: A Musical about AIDS

Soundtrack album by Glenn Schellenberg (music and lyrics) John Greyson (lyrics)
- Released: 1994
- Length: 56 minutes
- Label: BMG Music
- Producer: John Switzer

The Zero Patience soundtrack was released in 1994. Produced by John Switzer, it includes all of the songs and several pieces of incidental music, along with two remixes of the film's title song.

=== Track listing ===
1. "Zero Patience [Moulton Lava Club Remix]"
2. "Arabian Nights" - Instrumental
3. "Just Like Scheherazade" - Zero
4. "Culture of Certainty" - Richard Burton
5. "Pop-A-Boner" - Bathhouse trio
6. "Control" - Mary and ACT UP
7. "George's Theme" - Instrumental
8. "Pop-A-Boner [Reprise #1]" - Bathhouse trio
9. "Butthole Duet" - Richard Burton and Zero
10. "Positive" - George and schoolchildren
11. "Drowning Sailors' Theme" - Instrumental
12. "Love Theme" - Instrumental
13. "Contagious" - African Green Monkey
14. "Pop-A-Boner [Reprise #2]" - Bathhouse trio
15. "Scheherazade (Miss HIV)" - Miss HIV
16. "Six or Seven Things" - Richard Burton and Zero
17. "Zero Patience" - Principal cast
18. "Scheherazade (Tell a Story)" - Principal cast
19. "Zero Patience [Extended Burn Remix]"

== See also ==
- HIV and AIDS misconceptions
