= Atomic 7 =

Canadian instrumental rock band

- Origin: Toronto, Ontario, Canada
- Genres: Rock
- Years active: 1998–2007
- Labels: Mint, Eleganza Records
- Past members: Brian Connelly; Mark Duff; Brad Keogan; Rob Oxoby; Richie Lazarowich; Mandi Byrd; Mike Andreosso (drums); Clinton Ryder; Sean Dean; Neil Bartley

Atomic 7 was a Canadian instrumental rock trio formed in 1998, and led by its only constant member, former Shadowy Men on a Shadowy Planet guitarist Brian Connelly.

Atomic 7's music is completely instrumental; the band didn't even use vocal microphones on stage. According to one reviewer, "Every album contains about a 50/50 mix of country/swing and spaghetti western/surf/spy tunes." The band's most recent line-up was Brian Connelly on guitar, Mark Duff on drums and Brad Keogan on bass.

== History ==
Their debut album, Gowns by Edith Head was released in January 2003, and featured Brian Connelly on guitar, Clinton Ryder on double bass and Mike Andreosso on drums.

That album was followed by ...En Hillbilly Caliente in June 2004, with Mandi Bird taking over for Ryder on bass.

In February 2007, the band released their third and final album ... Something For The Girl With Everything.

== Discography ==
=== Singles ===
- "She's Got Haggar Party Slacks / I Regret Nothing" (1998), Eleganza Records

=== Albums ===
- ... Gowns By Edith Head (2002), Mint Records
- ... en Hillbilly Caliente (2004), Mint Records
- ... Something For The Girl With Everything (2007), Eleganza Records
