= The Famines =

- Origin: Edmonton, Alberta, Canada
- Genre: Indie rock
- Years active: 2008–present
- Labels: Reluctant Recordings, the Belgravian Press, Mammoth Cave Recording Co., Psychic Handshake
- Members: Raymond E. Biesinger; Drew Demers
- Past members: Garrett Heath Kruger
- Website: http://www.thefamines.ca

The Famines are a Canadian indie rock band formed in 2008 in Edmonton, Alberta. The two piece band uses a modern and minimalistic approach that draws comparison to mid 1970s protopunk and fuzzy garage rock. The band name is meant to be a commentary on the continued feeling of emptiness and lacking in a society that is materially fulfilled. The band has two members, R. E. Biesinger on guitar and vocals, and Drew Demers on the drums.

In 2020, The Famines announced that they had become a music publishing company called Pentagon Black.

== See also ==
- Rock music of Canada
- List of bands from Canada
