= Matthew Ferguson =

Canadian actor, screen writer and producer

- Born: Toronto, Ontario, Canada
- Occupation: Actor
- Years active: 1989–2010

Matthew Ferguson is a Canadian former actor. He is known for his roles in On My Own (1991), Love and Human Remains (1993), Lilies (1996), and La Femme Nikita (1997–2001).

== Life and career ==
Ferguson was born in Toronto, Ontario, Canada. He graduated from the Claude Watson School for the Arts and studied film production at Ryerson University. He is an actor, screen writer, theatre and film producer.

Ferguson made his debut in theatre as "Morgan Moreen" in Geometry in Venice (1989), which garnered him a Dora Mavor Moore Award nomination as Best Featured Actor, then on screen as Simon Henderson in On My Own (1991).

He is best known as "Seymour Birkoff", from the TV series La Femme Nikita (1997–2001).

His dramatic roles in movies such as Love and Human Remains (1993), Eclipse (1994) and Lilies (1996) gave him nominations at the Genie Awards in the 1990s. In 2002 his lead role in Sarah Polley's "I Shout Love" earned him an ACTRA Award nomination. Also in 2002, Ferguson was part of the ensemble cast of "An American In Canada" which won the Canadian Screen Award for best Comedy Series.

== Selected filmography ==
=== Film ===
- On My Own (1991) as Simon Henderson
- Love and Human Remains (1993) as Kane
- I Love a Man in Uniform (1993) as Edward Nichols
- Life with Billy (1993) as Allan Whynot
- The Club (1994) as Darren Spenser
- Lives of Girls and Women (1994) as Jerry Storey
- Spenser: Pale Kings and Princes (1994)
- Billy Madison (1995) as Tenth Grader
- Eclipse (1994) as Angelo
- Harrison Bergeron (1995) as Garth Bergeron
- The Deliverance of Elaine (1996)
- Lilies (1996) as Young Bilodeau
- The English Patient (1996) as Young Canadian Soldier
- Uncut (1997) as Peter Cort
- The Wall as (1998) Buelton
- Giving Up the Ghost (1998) as Matthew "Bulldog" Phelps
- I Shout Love (2001) as Bobby
- Cube 2: Hypercube (2002) as Max Reisler
- Three and a Half (2002) as Sasha the Director
- Owning Mahowny (2003) as Martin

=== TV ===
- Street Legal (1992) as Mark (2 episodes)
- La Femme Nikita (1997–2001) as Seymour Birkoff/Jason Crawford (90 episodes)
- An American in Canada (2003–2004) as Derrick (5 episodes)
- Odd Job Jack (2003–2007) as Bobby Lee (voice) (52 episodes)
- Top Cops (1991) as Mouthy Teenager ("Domingo Rico")

== Selected bibliography ==
- Heyn, Christopher. "A Conversation with Matthew Ferguson." Inside Section One: Creating and Producing TV's La Femme Nikita. Introduction by Peta Wilson. Los Angeles: Persistence of Vision Press, 2006. 94–99. ISBN 0-9787625-0-9. In-depth conversation with Matthew Ferguson about his role as Birkoff on La Femme Nikita, as well as his early acting experiences.

== Nominations ==
- 1993 - Australian Film Institute: Best Actor in a Leading Role for On My Own
- 1994 - Genie Awards: Performance by an Actor in a Supporting Role for Love & Human Remains
- 1996 - Genie Awards: Best Performance by an Actor in a Leading Role for Eclipse
- 1996 - Genie Awards: Best Performance by an Actor in a Leading Role for Lilies
- 1998 - Gemini Awards: Best Performance by an Actor in a Featured Supporting Role in a Dramatic Series for La Femme Nikita
- 2003 - ACTRA Toronto Awards: Outstanding Performance - Male for I Shout Love
