= The Law of Enclosures (film) =

- Poster
- Directed by: John Greyson
- Written by: John Greyson
- Based on: The Law of Enclosures by Dale Peck
- Produced by: Damon D'Oliveira; John Greyson; Phyllis Laing
- Starring: Sarah Polley; Brendan Fletcher
- Cinematography: Kim Derko
- Edited by: Mike Munn
- Music by: Don Pyle; Andrew Zealley
- Production company: Alliance Atlantis Communications
- Distributed by: Momentum Pictures
- Release date: September 15, 2000 (TIFF)
- Running time: 111 minutes
- Country: Canada
- Language: English
- Budget: $2 million
- Box office: $1,000

The Law of Enclosures is a 2000 Canadian drama film. It was written and directed by John Greyson, and based on the novel The Law of Enclosures by Dale Peck.

The story traces the marital relationship of Henry and Beatrice, characters based on Peck's real-life parents, over the course of their lives from their courtship as young adults to their 40th wedding anniversary. For the film adaptation, Greyson set the events in 1991 against the backdrop of the first Gulf War, with Henry and Beatrice's younger and older selves all coexisting in a single time frame.

Sarah Polley and Brendan Fletcher play Beatrice and Henry as a young couple, with Diane Ladd and Sean McCann playing the older characters. While author Peck was born in New York and raised in Kansas, Greyson set the film in Sarnia, Ontario. The score was written by Don Pyle and Andrew Zealley.

== Cast ==
- Sarah Polley as Beatrice
- Brendan Fletcher as Henry
- Diane Ladd as Bea
- Sean McCann as Hank
- Kristen Thomson as Myrah
- Rob Stefaniuk as Stanley
- Shirley Douglas as Myra
- Victor Cowie as Stan
- Sharon Bajer as Doctor
- Darcy Fehr as Young Miller
- Allegra Fulton as Henry's mother

== Award ==
- Brendan Fletcher won Best Performance by an Actor in a Leading Role at the 22nd Genie Awards.
