= Murder of Kenneth Zeller =

Murder and hate crime in Toronto in 1985

Kenneth Zeller (June 5, 1945 – June 22, 1985) was a teacher and librarian in Toronto, who was employed by Davisville Public School, Williamson Road Junior Public School and Western Technical-Commercial School. He was the victim of a homophobic hate crime when he was beaten to death by five youths in Toronto's High Park. Five young offenders were convicted and sentenced to prison.

On the 22 June 1985 a group of five teenage boys ages ranging from 15 to 18 years old went out with the aim of attacking a gay man. The group were celebrating the end of their school year and had been drinking before the incident occurred. They made their way to High Park, as it was a well known area for gay cruising. A witness overhead the group talking about going to the park to "beat up a fag" and "get money from a queer." It was at High Park they first saw Zeller, who attempted to walk past them only to be tripped up by one of the boys. Zeller attempted to run away from them and the gang chased him 100 meters to his parked car. Zeller was able to get his car door open but was attacked by the gang before he could get inside the vehicle. The group violently attacked him for around three minutes, before vandalising his car and leaving the area. Zeller's body was found after midnight on the 23 June 1985.

The teenagers were arrested on 28 June 1985 and tried as adults in court. They all plead guilty to manslaughter and were individually sentenced to nine years in prison.

The crime received media coverage and was the subject of a play called Steel Kiss, written by Robin Fulford and produced by Buddies in Bad Times theatre. Ken McDougall directed the 1991 Dora Award nominated production which featured Andrew Akman, Michael Waller, Derek Aasland, and Fab Fillippo. Fulford wrote a sequel play, Gulag, in 1996, and the two plays were jointly revived by Buddies in Bad Times in 1999, as a response to the October 1998 murder of Matthew Shepard.

John Greyson also produced a movie called The Making of Monsters, which analyzed the incident through the lens of radical queer activists disrupting the production of a heavily sanitized commercial movie of the week about the incident. It was screened at a number of film festivals in 1991, but was never commercially released for general viewing.

The incident also spurred the Toronto District School Board into implementing a program designed to eliminate discrimination based on sexual orientation.

The murder of Zeller was dramatized on Killer Kids.
