= I Shout Love =

2001 film by Sarah Polley

- Directed by: Sarah Polley
- Written by: Sarah Polley
- Produced by: Meredith Caplan; Jennifer Weiss
- Starring: Matthew Ferguson; Kristen Thomson; Julian Richings
- Cinematography: Luc Montpellier
- Edited by: David Wharnsby
- Music by: Don Pyle; Andrew Zealley
- Release date: September 2001 (TIFF)
- Running time: 38 minutes
- Country: Canada
- Language: English

I Shout Love is a 2001 Canadian short film written and directed by Sarah Polley. The film stars Matthew Ferguson and Kristen Thomson as Bobby and Tessa, a couple who are on the verge of breaking up when Tessa convinces Bobby to spend one last night together recording video of them reenacting the better times in their relationship.

The film won the Genie Award for Best Live Action Short Drama at the 23rd Genie Awards in 2003, and Thomson won an ACTRA Award for her performance.

The film was screened on CBC Television's Canadian Reflections in 2002, and was later distributed on the DVD release of Polley's feature film Away from Her.
