= Run Towards the Danger =

Essay collection by Sarah Polley

- First edition cover
- Author: Sarah Polley
- Illustrator: Lauren Tamaki
- Cover artist: Kelly Hill
- Language: English
- Genre: Essays, memoir
- Publisher: September Publishing
- Publication date: 1 March 2022
- Publication place: Canada
- ISBN: 978-0593300374

Run Towards the Danger: Confrontations with a Body of Memory is a 2022 essay collection by Canadian director, screenwriter, and former actress Sarah Polley. It was published on 1 March 2022 by September Publishing.

Each of the six essays in the collection examines a traumatic experience endured by Polley. She originally wrote the essays as stand-alone pieces over many years, and in some cases, decades.

The title of the book and the essay of the same name come from advice Polley was given when recovering from a concussion. She writes in the preface that "[t]elling [these stories] is a form of running towards the danger."

== Summary ==
The book is composed of six essays:

- Alice Collapsing, about Polley's time performing in the Stratford Festival production of Alice Through the Looking Glass, her battle with scoliosis, her experience with stage fright, and her relationship with her father, particularly after her mother's death. It took Polley 21 years to write this essay.
- The Woman Who Stayed Silent, about Polley's decision not to come forward about being sexually assaulted by broadcaster Jian Ghomeshi. As well as telling her own story, she explores the reasons why women may not come forward about experiences of sexual assault. The essay's title comes from a tweet which described Polley as "the woman who stayed silent" and wondered why she never spoke out about being assaulted by Ghomeshi.
- High Risk, about Polley's high-risk pregnancy with her first daughter, Eve. Polley writes about her difficult experience with breastfeeding Eve and the positive impact of the hospital support groups she attended. She also considers her relationship with her mother, who died when Polley was 11 years old.
- Mad Genius, about the danger and abuse she suffered while shooting The Adventures of Baron Munchausen at 9 years old. She discusses her experience working with Terry Gilliam and raises questions around child safeguarding on film sets.
- Dissolving the Boundaries, about her trip to Prince Edward Island as an adult. She reflects on her difficult experience as a child actor, particularly on the TV series Road to Avonlea.
- Run Towards the Danger, about her life-changing concussion, its symptoms, and her recovery process.

== Reception ==
The collection received a positive review from CBC which praised it for "riveting clarity".

Claire Armitstead of The Guardian described the book as "unlike any [memoir] I have ever read", and wrote that it gives "a bruisingly candid and intelligent account of the physical and psychic injuries Polley has suffered and surmounted".

Meghan Daum, writing in The New York Times, gave the book a positive review. She praised the essay "The Woman Who Stayed Silent" in particular, noting Polley's "precision and self-scrutiny".

The Irish Times also gave the book a positive review, praising the "brilliantly written" essays' exploration of "the resilience of the female body, so often a site of struggle but also a site of strength."
