= Sarah Polley =

Canadian actress, film director, and screenwriter (born 1979)

Sarah Polley OC
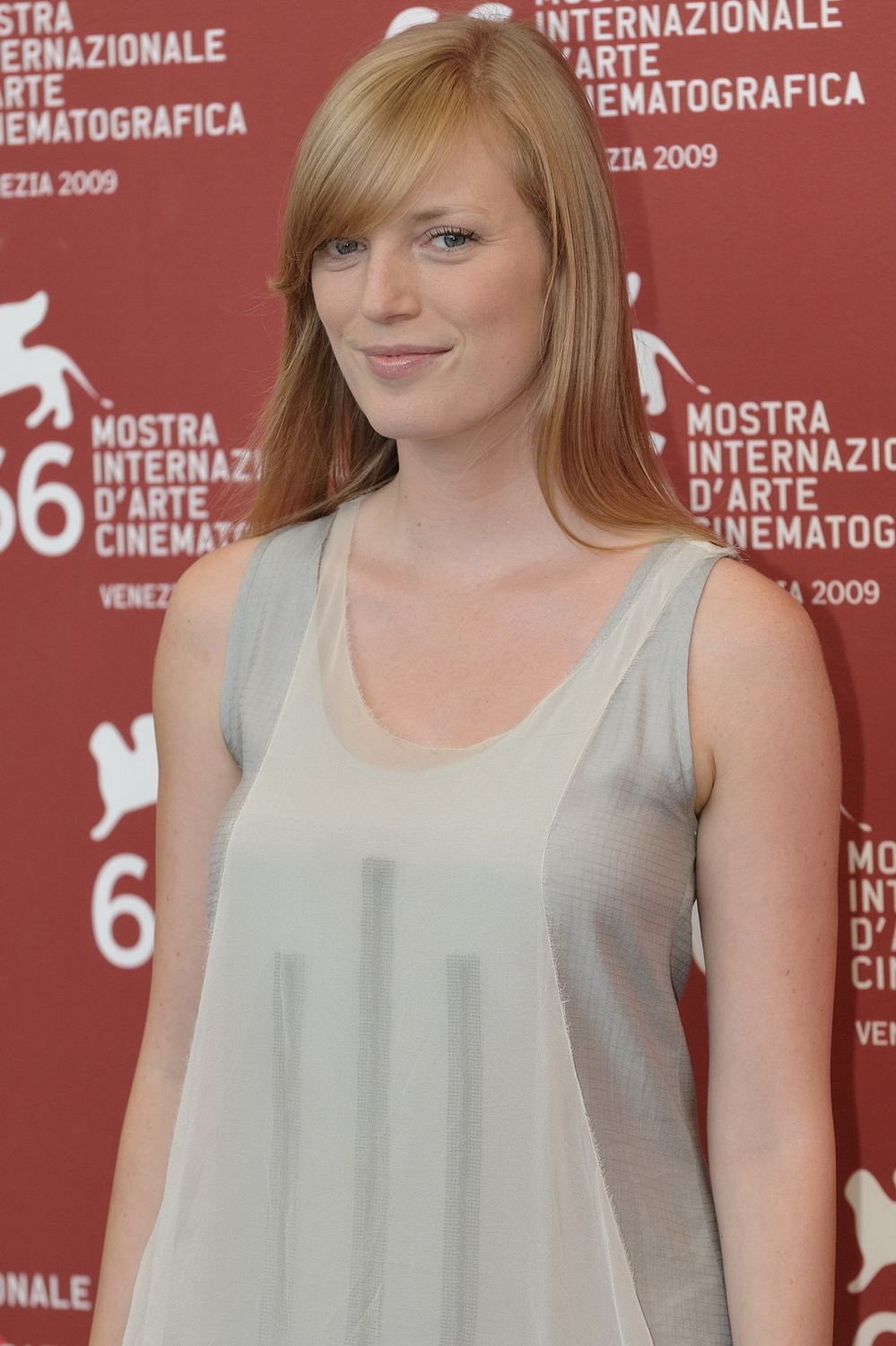
- Polley at the 2009 Venice International Film Festival
- Born: Sarah Ellen Polley; January 8, 1979 (age 47); Toronto, Ontario, Canada
- Occupations: Actor; writer; director; producer; political activist
- Years active: 1985–present
- Spouses: David Wharnsby (m. 2003; div. 2008); David Sandomierski (m. 2011)
- Children: 3
- Parent: Harry Gulkin (father)

Sarah Ellen Polley OC (born January 8, 1979) is a Canadian filmmaker, writer, political activist and actress. She first garnered attention as a child actress for her role as Ramona Quimby in the television series Ramona, based on Beverly Cleary's books. This subsequently led to her role as Sara Stanley in the Canadian television series Road to Avonlea (1990–1996). She has starred in many feature films, including The Adventures of Baron Munchausen (1988), Exotica (1994), The Sweet Hereafter (1997), Guinevere (1999), Go (1999), The Weight of Water (2000), No Such Thing (2001), My Life Without Me (2003), Dawn of the Dead (2004), Splice (2009), and Mr. Nobody (2009).

Polley made her feature film directorial debut with Away from Her (2006), for which she won the Canadian Screen Award for Best Director and was nominated for the Academy Award for Best Adapted Screenplay. Her second film, Take This Waltz (2011), premiered at the 2011 Toronto International Film Festival, followed by her first documentary film, Stories We Tell (2012). She also wrote the miniseries Alias Grace, based on the 1996 novel of the same name by Margaret Atwood. In 2022, she wrote and directed the film Women Talking, based on the 2018 novel of the same name by Miriam Toews, for which she won the Academy Award for Best Adapted Screenplay.

== Early life and education ==
Sarah Ellen Polley was born on January 8, 1979, in Toronto, Ontario, Canada, the youngest of five children born to Diane Elizabeth Polley (née MacMillan). Her siblings are Susy and John Buchan from Diane's first marriage to George Deans-Buchan, and Mark and Joanna Polley from her second marriage to Michael Polley (1933–2018), a British-born actor who became an insurance agent after starting a family with Diane.

Her mother was an actress (best known for playing Gloria Beecham in 44 episodes of the Canadian TV series Street Legal) and a casting director. She died of cancer the week of Polley's 11th birthday in 1990.

Polley suffered from severe scoliosis as a child and underwent a spinal operation at 15 that required her to spend the next year in bed recovering.

Polley was raised by Diane and Michael. During her childhood, Polley's siblings teased her because she bore no physical resemblance to Michael. Polley discovered as an adult that her biological father was actually Harry Gulkin, with whom her mother had an affair (as chronicled in Polley's film Stories We Tell). Gulkin, the son of Russian Jewish immigrants, was a Quebec-born film producer who produced the 1975 Canadian film Lies My Father Told Me, and had met Diane after attending a play in which she acted in Montreal in 1978. When Polley turned 18, she decided to follow up on suggestions from her mother's friends that her biological father might be Geoff Bowes—one of three castmates from her mother's play in Montreal. Meeting with Gulkin as just someone who could provide information about Diane in Montreal, he informed Polley of his affair with Diane. Gulkin's paternity was later confirmed by a DNA test.

Polley attended Subway Academy II, then Earl Haig Secondary School, but dropped out at age 15. By the age of 15 she was living on her own and credits the Ontario Coalition Against Poverty for housing her and developing her work with activism.

In November 2024, Polley received an honorary Doctors of Letters degree from the University of British Columbia Vancouver campus.

== Career ==
=== Child acting ===
Polley's first appearance on screen was at the age of four, as Molly in the film One Magic Christmas. She was in the pilot episode for Friday the 13th: The Series and appeared in a small role in William Fruet's sci-fi horror film Blue Monkey, both in 1987. At age of eight, she was cast as Ramona Quimby in the television series Ramona, based on Beverly Cleary's books.

That same year, she played one of the lead characters in Terry Gilliam's The Adventures of Baron Munchausen. Polley burst into the public eye in 1990 as Sara Stanley on the popular CBC television series Road to Avonlea. The series made her famous and financially independent, and she was hailed as "Canada's Sweetheart" by the popular press. The show was picked up by the Disney Channel for distribution in the United States. At the age of 12 (around 1991), Polley attended an awards ceremony while wearing a peace sign to protest the first Gulf War. Disney executives asked her to remove it, and she refused. This soured her relationship with Disney, but she continued on Road to Avonlea until 1994. The show ran until 1996; Polley did return as Sara Stanley for an episode in 1995 and for the series finale.

In 1994, Polley made her theatre debut at the Stratford Festival playing Alice in Alice Through the Looking Glass, an adaptation of Lewis Carroll's book of the same name. Polley ended her run early, claiming complications from scoliosis. In 2022 she revealed she had in fact been suffering from intense stage fright, something that continued to plague her into adulthood.

=== Adult acting ===
Polley appeared as Lily on the CBC television series Straight Up, which ran from 1996 to 1998, winning the Gemini Award for Best Performance in a Children's or Youth Program or Series for her role. By age thirteen, however, Polley was dissatisfied with her juvenile acting career. Her experience with director Atom Egoyan in a small but critical role in his sophisticated adult drama Exotica turned things around, as she revealed in a 2022 conversation with the director, filmed for Criterion's Exotica Blu-ray. Polley's subsequent role as Nicole Burnell in Egoyan's 1997 film The Sweet Hereafter brought her considerable attention in the United States; she was a favourite at the Sundance Film Festival. Her character in the film was an aspiring singer, and on the film's soundtrack, she performed covers of The Tragically Hip's "Courage" and Jane Siberry's "One More Colour" and sang the film's title track, which she co-wrote with Mychael Danna.

In 1998, Polley appeared in the critically acclaimed film Last Night. The following year, she starred as part of the ensemble cast in the film Go. She was cast in the role of Penny Lane in the big-budget 2000 film Almost Famous, but dropped out of the project to return to Canada for the low-budget The Law of Enclosures. Her role in the 2003 film My Life Without Me garnered the Genie Award for Best Performance by an Actress in a Leading Role in 2004. In the same year, she starred in a lead role in the remake of Dawn of the Dead, which was a departure from her other indie roles.

In 2005, she starred in The Secret Life of Words, opposite Tim Robbins and Julie Christie. She was nominated for the European Film Award for Best Actress by the European Film Academy for her role as Hanna.

In 2006, Polley took a role on the acclaimed series Slings & Arrows during its third and final season. Polley's adopted father, Michael, was a regular on the show during its entire three-season run. She served as a member of the 2007 Cannes Film Festival jury.

In 2008, Polley appeared as Nabby Adams in the HBO miniseries based on the life of John Adams. Polley played Elise in Jaco Van Dormael's Mr. Nobody, which was released in 2010. Critical response has praised the film's artistry and Polley's acting. Later that year, she also appeared in a cameo role in Bruce MacDonald's film Trigger.

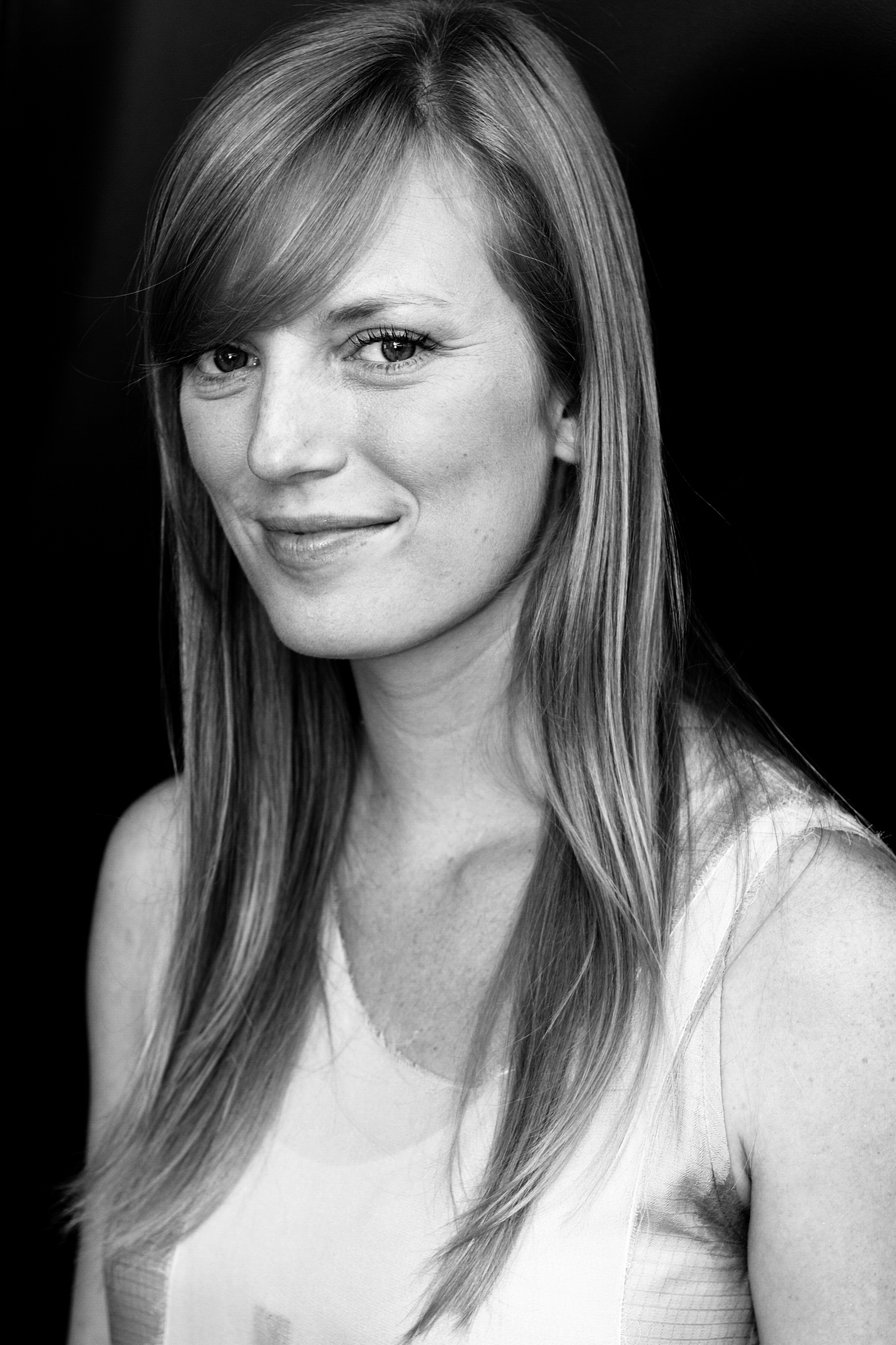
Polley on September 11, 2009

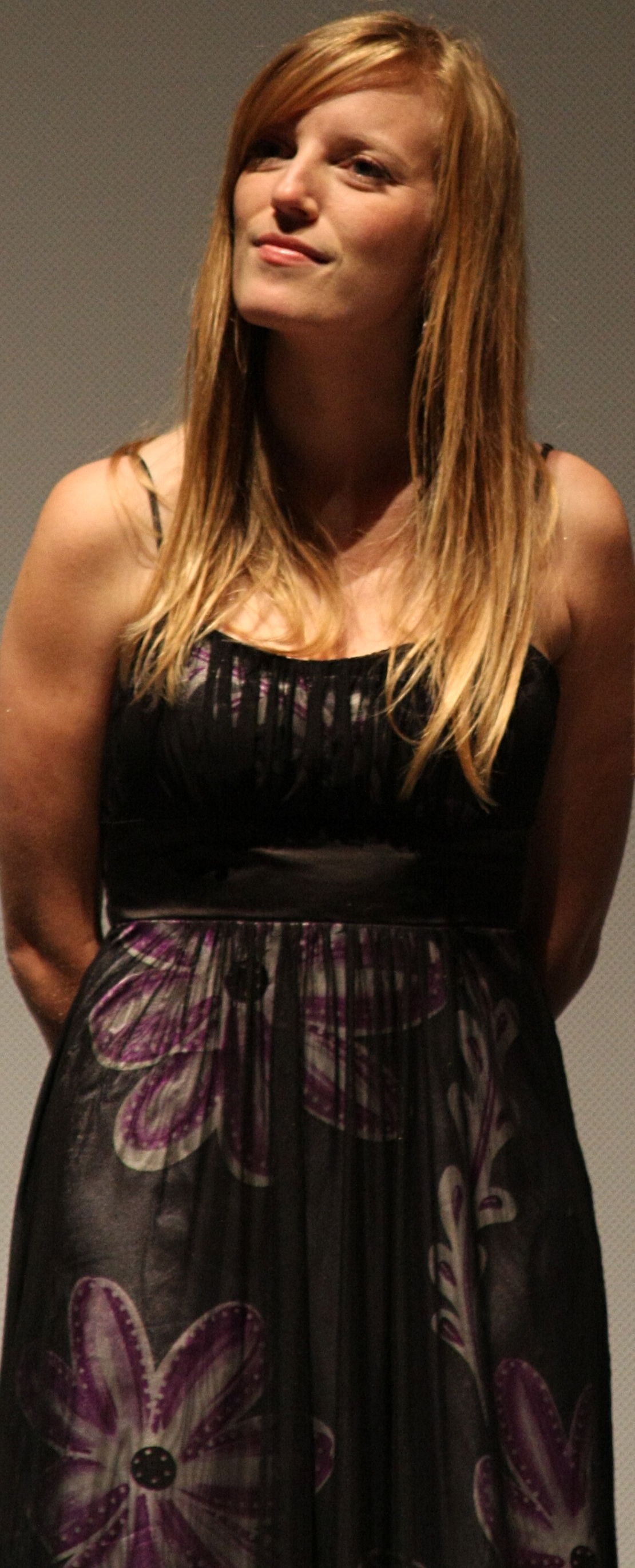
Polley at the premiere of Mr. Nobody at the 2009 Toronto Film Festival

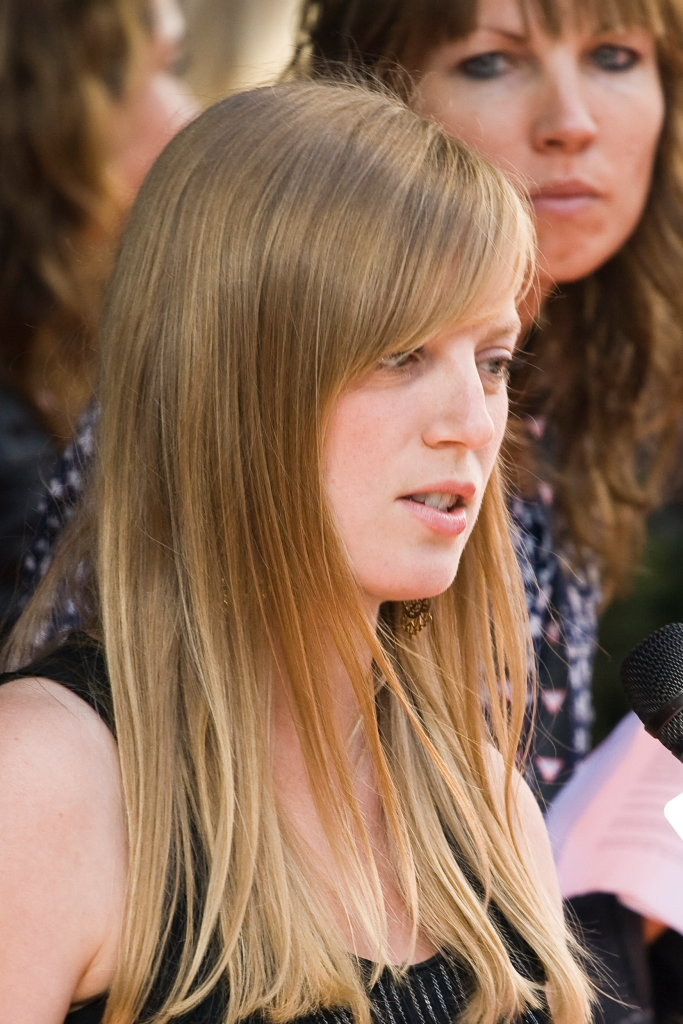
Polley at the 2010 Toronto International Film Festival

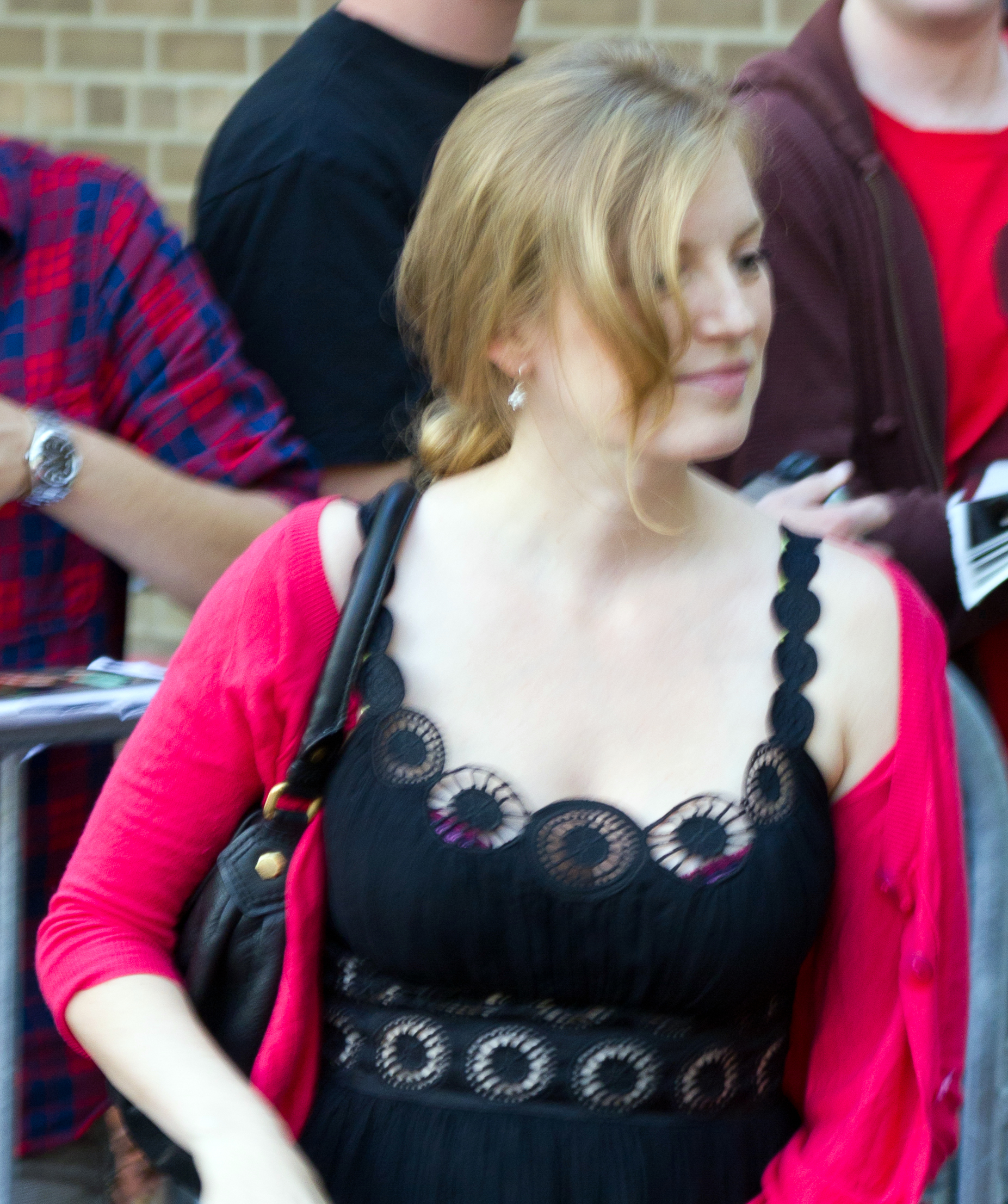
Polley at the 2011 Toronto International Film Festival.

While Polley did not officially retire from acting, after 2010 it would be fifteen years before she appeared onscreen again, with her focus transitioning into filmmaking career. In 2025, she played a guest role as herself in an episode of the television series The Studio, having been recruited by series creator Seth Rogen, a friend and prior collaborator. Polley described the role as an "opportunity to let out a lot of the frustrations I’ve ever had as a director—to finally let them out onscreen," adding that she appreciated the chance to act in a comedy.

=== Directing ===
In 1999, Polley made her first short film, The Best Day of My Life, for the On the Fly 4 Film Festival. She also made a second short film that year, Don't Think Twice. Polley attended the Canadian Film Centre's directing program in 2001, and won the Genie Award for Best Live Action Short Drama in 2003 for her short film I Shout Love. She made her feature-length film directing debut with Away from Her, which Polley adapted from the Alice Munro short story The Bear Came Over the Mountain. The movie, starring Christie (with whom she had played in No Such Thing and The Secret Life of Words), debuted at the Toronto International Film Festival (TIFF) on September 11, 2006, as part of the TIFF's Gala showcase. Away from Her was acquired by Lionsgate Films for release in the US for the sum of $750,000. It drew rave reviews from Variety, The Hollywood Reporter, and the three Toronto dailies, both for the performances of Christie and her co-star, Canadian actor Gordon Pinsent, and for Polley's direction. It also earned Polley a 2007 Academy Award nomination for Best Adapted Screenplay, and won the Genie Award for Best Achievement in Direction. At the 2008 Genies, she was also awarded the Claude Jutra Award, which recognizes outstanding achievement by a first-time feature film director.

Polley wrote and directed her second feature, Take This Waltz starring Michelle Williams, Rogen, Luke Kirby and Sarah Silverman, which premiered at the 2011 Toronto International Film Festival.

Her documentary film Stories We Tell premiered at the 69th Venice International Film Festival in competition in the Venice Days category, and its North American premiere followed at the 2012 Toronto International Film Festival. The critically acclaimed documentary examined family secrets in Polley's own childhood. She was awarded the CAN$100,000 prize for best Canadian film of the year by the Toronto Film Critics Association.

In late 2012, Polley announced that she would be adapting Margaret Atwood's novel Alias Grace. Polley first wrote to Atwood asking to adapt the novel when she was 17. They held off for 20 years until she was ready to make the show. In August 2014, during a profile of her work as a director, Polley announced that Alias Grace was being adapted into a six-part miniseries. In June 2016, the series was confirmed with Polley writing and producing. The series premiered in 2017 on CBC in Canada; it streams on Netflix globally, outside of Canada. It received positive reviews from critics. Also in the same year, Polley executive produced the film A Better Man.

In June 2014, it was announced that Polley would write and direct an adaptation of John Green's Looking for Alaska. In March 2015, she was hired to potentially write and direct a new adaptation of Little Women. Her involvement in the project ultimately never went beyond initial discussion. In her 2022 essay collection Run Towards the Danger, Polley revealed she had been working on a second draft of the Little Women screenplay when she had a traumatic head injury resulting in post-concussion syndrome that left her with symptoms for four years so she was temporarily unable to work until she found effective treatment through University of Pittsburgh Medical Center's concussion program. It was subsequently announced in June that, due to scheduling conflicts, Polley would no longer be directing Looking for Alaska.

In an interview, Polley stated that she takes pride in her work and enjoys both acting and directing, but is not keen on combining the two:

I like the feeling of keeping them separate. I find that really gratifying. I can't imagine combining those. For me, I love the feeling of using different parts of my brain separately.

In a 2015 retrospective of the movie Go, Mike D'Angelo of The A.V. Club commented that Polley's decision to go into directing had "deprived the world of many potentially great performances", calling her a "superb actor".

In December 2020, it was announced Polley would direct Women Talking based upon the novel of the same name by Miriam Toews for Orion Pictures. It premiered at the 49th Telluride Film Festival on September 2, 2022, and went into wide release on December 23, 2022. It was released to widespread acclaim, with 90% of critics giving it a positive review on Rotten Tomatoes. Shirley Li of The Atlantic called it "vibrant cinema," while Anna Bogutskaya of Time Out said that it "imagines female emancipation as an honest, raging, caring experience." Polley won the Academy Award for Best Adapted Screenplay at the 95th Academy Awards, and the film was also nominated for the Best Picture.

In 2023, Polley was revealed to be in talks to direct Disney's live action adaptation of Bambi, but in March 2024, it never came to fruition due to Polley reportedly no longer being attached as a director.

=== Writing ===
Polley has written numerous essays over the years about her experiences as a child star. In 2022, she released her first book of essays, the autobiographical, Run Towards the Danger which contains six essays that examine aspects of Polley's career on stage, screen, and on film, detailing her roles in a Stratford Festival production of Alice Through The Looking Glass, as well as her breakout roles in The Adventures of Baron Munchausen and the TV series Road to Avonlea. The book also alleged for the first time that Polley had been a victim of Jian Ghomeshi who she says sexually and physically assaulted her when she was 16 and he was 28.

== Political and social activism ==
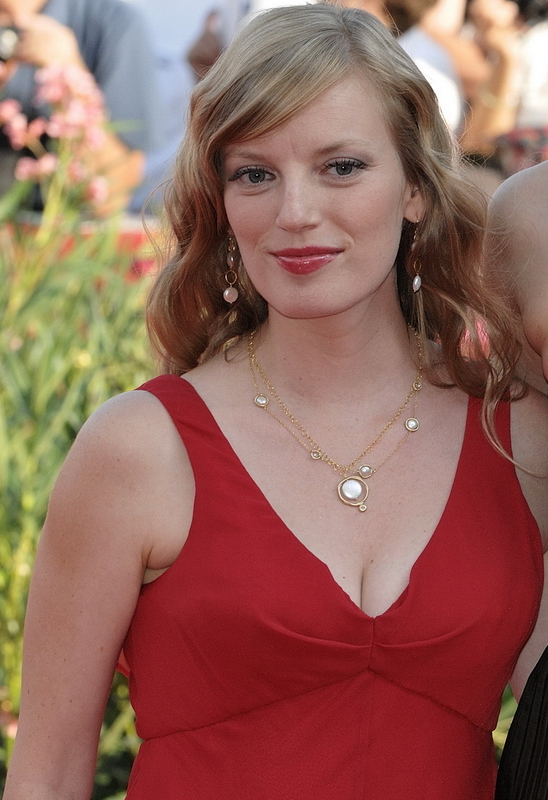
Polley in 2009

Following the row with Disney as a twelve-year-old for wearing a peace sign to protest against the Gulf War, Polley dedicated more of her efforts to politics, becoming a prominent member of the Ontario New Democratic Party (ONDP), where Ontario legislator Peter Kormos was her political mentor. In 1996, she gave a nomination speech for Kormos at the ONDP leadership convention which she later referred to as the "proudest moment in [her] life".

In 1995, she lost two back teeth after being struck by a riot police officer during a protest against the provincial Progressive Conservative government of Mike Harris in Queen's Park. She was subsequently involved with the Ontario Coalition Against Poverty, but later scaled back her political activism. She was part of a group in 2001 which opposed the proposed Free Trade Area of the Americas. The 3rd Summit of the Americas was held in Quebec City in April 2001. In 2003, she was part of former Toronto mayor David Miller's transition advisory team.

In 2009, Polley directed a two-minute short film in support of the Heart and Stroke Foundation of Canada. In advance of the film's airing in Canada during the 82nd Academy Awards, and following news reports that characterized the film as a marketing exercise for the margarine company Becel, Polley withdrew her association with the film. "In December 2009, I made a film to be aired during the Academy Awards that I believed was to promote the Heart and Stroke Foundation. When I agreed to make this film ["The Heart"], I was thrilled, as I was proud to be associated with the work of this incredible organization. However, I have since learned that my film is also being used to promote a product. Regretfully, I am forced to remove my name from the film and disassociate myself from it. I have never actively promoted any corporate brand, and cannot do so now." In response, Becel said it was a "founding sponsor" of the Heart Truth campaign and had commissioned the film "to put heart health on the radar of Canadian women".

In January 2012, Polley endorsed Toronto MP Peggy Nash in the 2012 New Democratic Party leadership race to succeed Jack Layton.

On October 15, 2017, Polley wrote an op-ed piece in The New York Times detailing her experience with Harvey Weinstein and with Hollywood's treatment of women generally, and making a connection between Hollywood's gendered power relations and Polley's not having acted in years.

Polley endorsed Olivia Chow in 2023 and 2026 Toronto Mayoral Elections.

== Personal life ==
In 2007, Polley discovered the man who raised her, Michael Polley, was not her biological father. The story of her mother's affair with her biological father, producer Harry Gulkin, was chronicled in her 2012 film, Stories We Tell.

On September 10, 2003, Polley married Canadian film editor David Wharnsby. They divorced in 2008. On August 23, 2011, she married David Sandomierski. They have three children.

In her 2022 autobiographical essay collection, Run Towards the Danger, Polley said she was sexually assaulted by Moxy Früvous singer Jian Ghomeshi on a 1995 date, while she was 16 and he was 28. Family and friends dissuaded her from coming forward.

Polley is an atheist.

== Filmography ==
=== Film ===
==== Acting ====
Year	Title	Role	Notes
1985	One Magic Christmas	Molly Monaghan	
1986	Confidential	Emma	
1987	Tomorrow's a Killer	Karla	
1987	The Big Town	Christy Donaldson	
1987	Blue Monkey	Ellen	
1988	The Adventures of Baron Munchausen	Sally Salt	
1989	Babar: The Movie	Young Celeste	Voice
1994	Exotica	Tracey Brown	
1996	Joe's So Mean to Josephine	Josephine	
1996	Children First!		
1997	The Sweet Hereafter	Nicole Burnell	
1997	The Hanging Garden	Rosemary (teen)	
1997	The Planet of Junior Brown	Butter	
1998	Jerry and Tom	Deb	
1998	Last Night	Jennifer 'Jenny' Wheeler	
1998	Guinevere	Harper Sloane	
1999	Go	Ronna Martin	
1999	Existenz	Merle	
1999	The Life Before This	Connie	
2000	The Weight of Water	Maren Hontvedt	
2000	Love Come Down	Sister Sarah	
2000	The Law of Enclosures	Beatrice	
2000	The Claim	Hope Dillon	
2000	Preludes		Short film; segment: "This Might Be Good"
2001	No Such Thing	Beatrice	
2003	The Event	Dana Shapiro	
2003	My Life Without Me	Ann	
2003	Dermott's Quest	Gwen	Short film
2003	Luck	Margaret	
2004	Dawn of the Dead	Ana Clark	
2004	The I Inside	Clair	
2004	Sugar	Pregnant Girl	
2004	Siblings	Tabby	
2005	Don't Come Knocking	Sky	
2005	The Secret Life of Words	Hanna	
2005	Beowulf & Grendel	Selma	
2009	Mr. Nobody	Elise (adult)	
2009	Splice	Elsa Kast	
2010	Trigger	Hillary	

==== Production ====
Key
†	Denotes films that have not yet been released

Feature film

Year	Title	Director	Writer	Executive producer
2006	Away from Her	Yes	Yes	No
2011	Take This Waltz	Yes	Yes	Yes
2022	Women Talking	Yes	Yes	No
2025	& Sons	No	Yes	No
TBA	The Bell Jar †	Yes	Yes	TBA

Documentary film

Year	Title	Director	Writer
2012	Stories We Tell	Yes	Yes

Short film

Year	Title	Director	Writer	Producer
1999	Don't Think Twice	Yes	Yes	Yes
1999	The Best Day of My Life	Yes	Yes	No
2001	I Shout Love	Yes	Yes	No
2002	All I Want for Christmas	Yes	No	No
2013	Making a Scene	No	Yes	No

=== Television ===
==== Acting ====
Year	Title	Role	Notes
1985	Night Heat	Cindy Keating	Episode: "The Game"
1986	The Incredible Time Travels of Henry Osgood		Television film
1987	Heaven on Earth	Becky Hawthorne	Television film
1987	Hands of a Stranger	Suzie Hearn	Television film
1987	Friday the 13th: The Series	Mary	Episode: "The Inheritance"
1988–1989	Ramona	Ramona Quimby	Main role
1989	Lantern Hill	Jody Turner	Television film
1990–1996	Road to Avonlea	Sara Stanley	Main role (seasons 1–5), guest role (seasons 6 & 7)
1991	Johann's Gift to Christmas	Angel	Short film
1991	The Hidden Room	Alice	Episode: "Dangerous Dreams"
1994	Take Another Look	Amy	Television film
1996	Straight Up	Lily	
1998	White Lies	Catherine Chapman	Television film
1999	Made in Canada	Rhonda	Episode: "It's a Science"
2006	Slings & Arrows	Sophie	Main role (season 3)
2008	John Adams	Abigail Adams Smith	Miniseries
2025	The Studio	Herself	Episode: "The Oner"

==== Production ====
Year	Title	Director	Writer	Producer	Notes
2004	The Shields Stories	Yes	Yes	No	Episode "The Harp"
2017	Alias Grace	No	Yes	Yes	Miniseries
2020	Hey Lady!	Yes	No	No	8 episodes
2026	The Studio	No	Yes	No	1 episode

Executive producer

- Secret Path (2016) (Television film)
- A Better Man (2017) (Documentary)

== Awards and nominations ==
On October 16, 2010, it was announced that Polley would receive a star on Canada's Walk of Fame. In June 2013, she received the National Arts Centre Award recognizing achievement over the past performance year at the Governor General's Performing Arts Awards, where she was the subject of a short vignette by Ann Marie Fleming entitled Stories Sarah Tells. She was appointed an Officer of the Order of Canada on December 30, 2013.

Year	Association	Category	Work	Result	Ref.
2008	Academy Awards	Best Adapted Screenplay	Away from Her	Nominated	
2023	Academy Awards	Best Adapted Screenplay	Women Talking	Won	
2006	ACTRA	ACTRA Toronto Award of Excellence		Won	
2020	ACTRA	ACTRA Woman of the Year		Won	
2007	Alliance of Women Film Journalists	Best Director	Away from Her	Nominated	
2007	Alliance of Women Film Journalists	Best Woman Director	Away from Her	Won	
2007	Alliance of Women Film Journalists	Best Woman Screenwriter	Away from Her	Nominated	
2007	Alliance of Women Film Journalists	Women's Image Award	Herself	Won	
2007	Alliance of Women Film Journalists	Outstanding Achievement by a Woman in 2007	Herself	Nominated	
2007	Alliance of Women Film Journalists	Best Leap from Actress to Director Award	Herself	Won	
2012	Alliance of Women Film Journalists	Best Woman Director	Take This Waltz	Nominated	
2012	Alliance of Women Film Journalists	Best Woman Screenwriter	Take This Waltz	Nominated	
2013	Alliance of Women Film Journalists	Best Documentary	Stories We Tell	Won	
2013	Alliance of Women Film Journalists	Best Woman Director	Stories We Tell	Nominated	
2013	Alliance of Women Film Journalists	Best Woman Screenwriter	Stories We Tell	Nominated	
2023	Critics' Choice Awards	Best Adapted Screenplay	Women Talking	Won	
2006	European Film Awards	European Actress	The Secret Life of Words	Nominated	
1988	Gemini Awards	Best Performance by an Actress in a Continuing Leading Dramatic Role	Ramona	Nominated	
1990	Gemini Awards	Best Performance by an Actress in a Continuing Leading Dramatic Role	Road to Avonlea	Nominated	
1992	Gemini Awards	Best Performance by an Actress in a Supporting Role	Lantern Hill	Won	
1993	Gemini Awards	Best Performance by an Actress in a Continuing Leading Dramatic Role	Road to Avonlea	Nominated	
1994	Gemini Awards	Best Performance by an Actress in a Continuing Leading Dramatic Role	Road to Avonlea	Nominated	
1998	Gemini Awards	Best Performance in a Children's or Youth Program or Series	Straight Up	Won	
1998	Gemini Awards	Best Performance by an Actress in a Featured Supporting Role in a Dramatic Program or Miniseries	The Planet of Junior Brown	Nominated	
1998	Gemini Awards	Best Performance by an Actress in a Leading Role in a Dramatic Program or Mini-Series	White Lies	Nominated	
2007	Gemini Awards	Best Performance by an Actress in a Featured Supporting Role in a Dramatic Series	Slings and Arrows	Nominated	
1997	Genie Awards	Best Original Song	The Sweet Hereafter	Nominated	
1997	Genie Awards	Best Performance by an Actress in a Leading Role	The Sweet Hereafter	Nominated	
2002	Genie Awards	Best Performance by an Actress in a Leading Role	The Law of Enclosures	Nominated	
2003	Genie Awards	Best Live Action Short Drama	I Shout Love	Won	
2004	Genie Awards	Best Performance by an Actress in a Leading Role	My Life Without Me	Won	
2008	Genie Awards	Claude Jutra Award (Special Prize)	Away from Her	Won	
2008	Genie Awards	Best Director	Away from Her	Won	
2008	Genie Awards	Best Adapted Screenplay	Away from Her	Won	
2023	Golden Globe Awards	Best Screenplay - Motion Picture	Women Talking	Nominated	
2000	Independent Spirit Awards	Best Supporting Female	Go	Nominated	
2023	Independent Spirit Awards	Robert Altman Award	Women Talking	Won	
2012	Toronto Film Critics Association Awards	Rogers Canadian Film Award	Stories We Tell	Won	
2012	Toronto Film Critics Association Awards	Best Documentary Film Award	Stories We Tell	Won	
2014	Writers Guild of America Awards	Best Documentary Screenplay	Stories We Tell	Won	
2023	Writers Guild of America Awards	Best Adapted Screenplay	Women Talking	Won	
