= Glenn Schellenberg =

Glenn Schellenberg is a Canadian composer and a professor of psychology at the University of Toronto Mississauga.

== Early life and education ==
Schellenberg studied psychology at University of Toronto, where he received a B.Sc.. He went on to obtain a PhD in 1994 in psychology in Cornell University.

== Career ==
In the 1980s, Schellenberg played keyboards and was the principal songwriter for the synth-pop band TBA, along with Paul Hackney, Steven Bock and Andrew Zealley. After the departure of Hackney and Bock, Glen Binmore, Dianne Bos, and Brian Skol joined the band. Schellenberg also played in the bands The Dishes and The Everglades, and performed live with Martha and the Muffins. Side-projects included The Beds (with Tony Malone) and Anti-Normal (with Tim Guest, Massimo Agostinelli, and Billy Sutherland).

Schellenberg composed music for three films directed by John Greyson. For one of these films, Zero Patience, Schellenberg was nominated, along with Greyson, for a Genie Award for Best Original Song for the song "Just Like Scheherazade". He also composed the theme song (and approximately 50 other songs) for a children's television show called The Adventures of Dudley the Dragon. His songs on the show were sung by Jackie Richardson, Jackie Burroughs, Eric Peterson, Graham Greene, and Clark Johnson.

Schellenberg joined the faculty of the University of Windsor as an assistant professor in 1993, conducting research into the psychology of music. He worked next as an associate professor at Dalhousie University for a single academic year, 1997-1998.

Schellenberg then moved to the University of Toronto Mississauga, where he became a full professor in 2004. He has published a number of research papers, including one about the evolution of pop music. His finding that pop songs have become increasingly melancholy over time was covered widely by the media. His main areas of research include (1) memory for music, and (2) how exposure to music is associated with non-musical abilities. During his sabbatical research leaves, Schellenberg had the opportunity to live and work in Sydney, Amsterdam, Berlin, Marseille, and Montpellier.
