= The Law of Enclosures =

1996 novel by Dale Peck

- First edition cover
- Author: Dale Peck
- Publisher: Farrar, Straus & Giroux
- Publication date: January 1, 1996
- ISBN: 0-374-18419-4

The Law of Enclosures is a 1996 novel by American author Dale Peck, which was adapted into the 2000 film The Law of Enclosures by Canadian director John Greyson.

A cross between a conventional novel and a memoir, the book dramatizes the marital relationship of Henry and Beatrice, characters based on Peck's real-life parents, depicted in alternating time frames ranging from a young couple first falling in love to an older couple renewing their bond after 40 years of marriage.
