= Don Pyle =

Canadian record producer and musician

- Origin: Canada
- Genres: Rock; electronic
- Occupations: Record producer, musician

Don Pyle is a Canadian record producer and musician, who has also been a member of multiple bands. Pyle is gay.

== Life and career ==
Pyle's first group was a punk band called Crash Kills Five, which was active from 1979 to 1981. Crash Kills Five released one EP in 1980, titled What Do You Do At Night?. It was in this four-piece band that Pyle first played with two members, Reid Diamond and Brian Connelly, who would later become his bandmates in Shadowy Men on a Shadowy Planet. Shadowy Men on a Shadowy Planet were together for eleven years; during this time, they recorded three LPs and thirteen EPs and became widely known when the song "Having An Average Weekend" became the theme for the Canadian sketch comedy television series The Kids in the Hall. The band also won a Juno Award for Instrumental Artist of the Year at the Juno Awards of 1992. Shadowy Men on a Shadowy Planet also recorded with B-52s vocalist Fred Schneider for his solo album Just Fred.

Pyle also played with several other bands such as King Cobb Steelie and Fifth Column while on hiatus from Shadowy Men on a Shadowy Planet. During these periods he began producing recordings for other bands, including the debut single and LP by King Cobb Steelie and a record by Phleg Camp. After Shadowy Men broke up in 1994, he and Reid Diamond then formed the band Phono-Comb with Dallas Good for the express purpose of playing and recording with Jad Fair. After releasing one single and an LP, Fair returned to solo performing, and the trio released another single. Beverly Breckenridge of Fifth Column then joined the group to play bass and the quartet recorded the LP Fresh Gasoline for Quarterstick/Touch and Go Records, with Steve Albini producing.

After Phono-Comb broke up, Pyle began a new musical project with Andrew Zealley called Greek Buck. More experimental than his previous outfits, Greek Buck was noted primarily for their soundtrack compositions, such as those composed for films directed by John Greyson including The Law of Enclosures (1999) and Proteus (2003), Sarah Polley's film I Shout Love, and most famously, the theme song of the series Queer As Folk.

In April 2007, Pyle launched his "Trouble in the Camera Club" photography show at The Beaver Cafe/bar in Toronto. The extensive collection of photographs documented the birth of the punk music scene in Toronto clubs during 1976–1980. An on-line version of the show was available on his official website.

Trouble in the Camera Club was published as a photo and essay book by ECW Press in 2011 and included over 300 photographs of Toronto punk bands such as Viletones, and Teenage Head. His photos of international artists include Iggy Pop, Ramones, Dead Boys, The Heartbreakers, Vibrators, and The Troggs.

As a producer, music recorder, and mixer, his credits include releases by The Sadies, Iggy Pop, Peaches, John Doe, Andre Williams, and others. He composed and produced music for films by Ron Mann, Sarah Polley, and John Greyson as well as composing and/or producing music for The Inside Out Film and Video Festival, TV Ontario, Dragon's Den, and others.

In 2012 and 2013, Pyle released recordings by his two bands. The Filthy Gaze of Europe, his collaboration with Dallas Good, had a 7" released by Ugly Pop records, with vocals by Damian Abraham, and Chris Colohan, with cover art by G. B. Jones. Black Heel Marks released an album called Feel Free in June 2013 that included Pyle in collaboration with Tacoma rock band Girl Trouble, Sandro Perri, and others.

In 2026 he published Rough Description: Love Letters and Ghost Stories From a Life in Music, a career memoir. The book was launched with a public reading at the Standard Time event venue in Toronto, with a supporting DJ set by Georgia Hubley and Ira Kaplan of Yo La Tengo.
