= John Greyson =

Canadian filmmaker

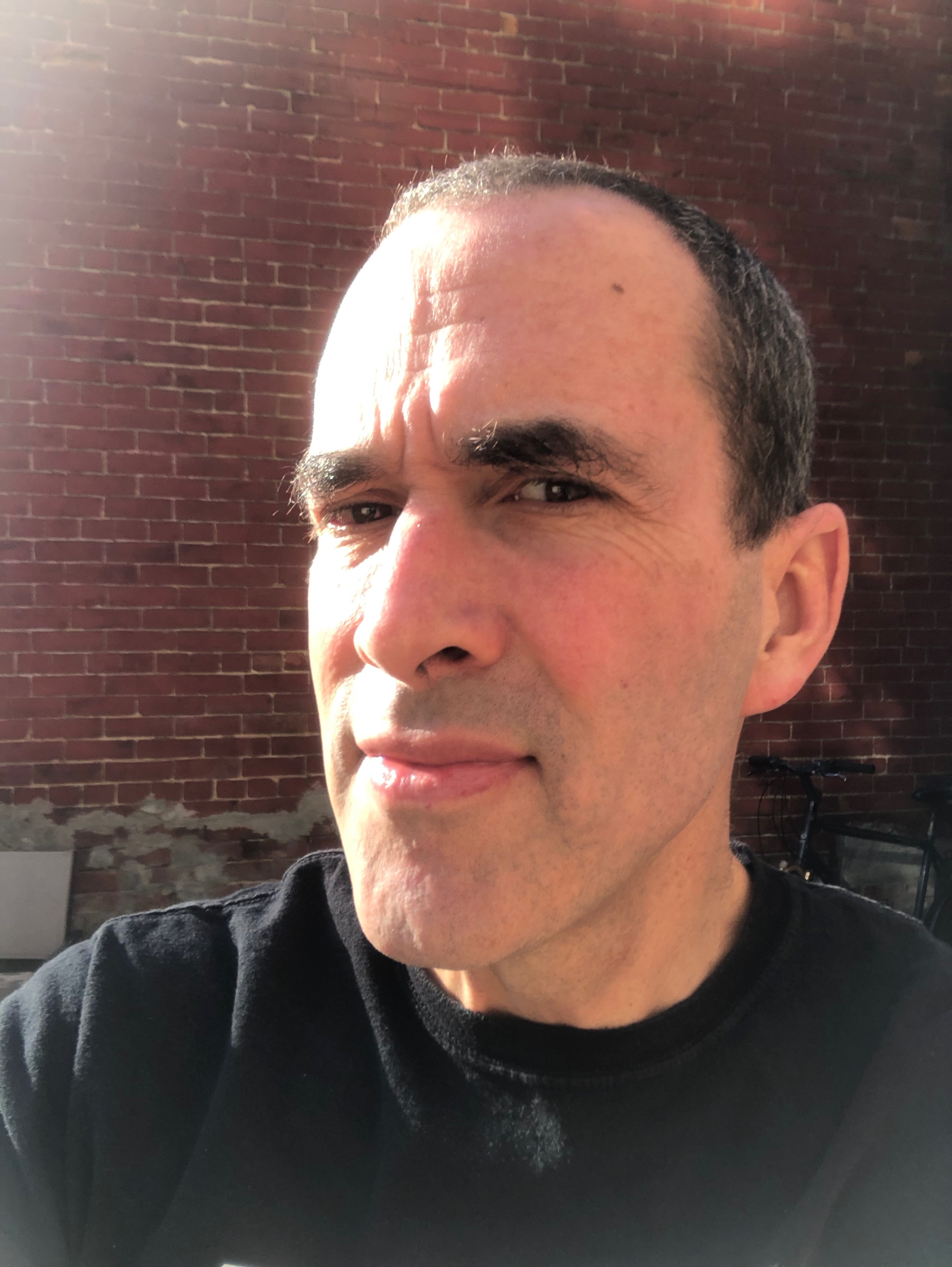
- Greyson in 2014
- Born: John Greyson; March 13, 1960 (age 66); Nelson, British Columbia, Canada
- Occupations: Film director, film producer, screenwriter, video artist
- Years active: 1984–present
- Partner: Stephen Andrews

John Greyson (born March 13, 1960) is a Canadian director, writer, video artist, producer, and political activist, whose work frequently deals with queer characters and themes. He was part of a loosely affiliated group of filmmakers to emerge in the 1980s from Toronto known as the Toronto New Wave.

Greyson has won accolades and achieved critical success with his films—most notably Zero Patience (1993) and Lilies (1996). His outspoken persona, activism, and public image have also attracted international press and controversy.

Greyson is also a professor at York University's film school, where he teaches film and video theory, film production, and editing.

== Early life ==
Greyson was born in Nelson, British Columbia, the son of Dorothy F. (née Auterson) and Richard I. Greyson. He was raised in London, Ontario, before moving to Toronto in 1978, where he became a writer for The Body Politic and other local arts and culture magazines, as well as a video and performance artist.

== Career ==
He directed several short films, including The Perils of Pedagogy, Kipling Meets the Cowboy, and Moscow Does Not Believe in Queers, before releasing his first feature film, Pissoir, in 1988. Pissoir is a response to the homophobic climate of the period and, particularly, to police entrapment of men in public washrooms (toilets) and parks and police raids on gay bathhouses.

Greyson’s early video work was “social change documentary.” During the 1980s and 1990s, Greyson created many videos as a form of AIDS activism. One of his first videos to address AIDS was Moscow Does Not Believe in Queers (1986).

The ADS Epidemic (1987) also addresses the AIDS epidemic. Greyson created this video as part of the Public Access Collective’s The Lunatic of One Idea project. The project involved a number of artists creating works to be displayed at Square One Mall in Mississauga, Ontario, between the advertisements that were usually played on a 36-screen video grid at the mall. Greyson describes the title as a “dual purpose acronym,” referring both to the titular “Acquired Dread of Sex” (evoking the AIDS epidemic, which the film addresses) and the advertisements typically displayed on the screen where this video was exhibited. The video is a musical spoof of Luchino Visconti’s Death in Venice (1971). It was filmed in Toronto over one day. Its accompanying song was written by Glenn Schellenberg, with Greyson providing lyrics. The cast included Colin Campbell as Aschenbach, and his son Neil Campbell as a young man on a ferry. Greyson defined his goals for this video as “talking about that culture of fear and hatred that early AIDS discourses in the mainstream media and state policies had produced, demonizing queers, creating a general sense of sex panic, and trying to combat that through humor and music.”

Greyson's next film was The Making of Monsters, a short musical film produced during Greyson's residency at the Canadian Film Centre in 1991. The film deals with the 1985 murder by five adolescent males of Kenneth Zeller, a high school teacher and librarian, when he was allegedly cruising for sexual encounters in Toronto's High Park. The film is a fictional documentary about the making of a movie-of-the-week, entitled Monsters, in which the young murderers are depicted as psychopathic monsters, rather than normal teenage boys. The film features Marxist literary critic Georg Lukács as the producer of Monsters, with Bertolt Brecht (played by a catfish) as director. Greyson's film was pulled from distribution when the estate of Kurt Weill objected to its use of the tune of Mack the Knife. Greyson had originally received copyright permission to use the tune, but it was withdrawn, apparently because Weill's estate objected to the film's homosexual themes. Although copyright is no longer an issue, having lapsed in 2000, fifty years after Weill's death, the film has not yet been re-released by the Canadian Film Development Corporation.

The copyright issues that came out of creating The Making of Monsters inspired documentary segments in his film Un©ut (1997), which explored debates around how copyright law affects artists, outing public figures (with the example of Pierre Trudeau), and circumcision.

He is best known for the feature-length films Zero Patience and Lilies. His other films include Un©ut (1997), The Law of Enclosures (1999), and Proteus (2003). He has also directed for television, including episodes of Queer as Folk, Made in Canada, and Paradise Falls.

In 2003, Greyson and composer David Wall created Fig Trees, a video opera for gallery installation, about the struggles of South African AIDS activist Zackie Achmat. In 2009, a film version of Fig Trees was released. This film, a feature-length documentary opera, premiered at the Berlinale as part of its Panorama section, where it won the Teddy Award for Best Documentary.

In 2007, Greyson was the recipient of the Bell Award in Video Art. The award committee stated: "John Greyson is perhaps best known to a general public as a feature film director. He shoots his 'film' projects on video with trademark video post-production techniques, thus colonizing the space of cinema with the aesthetics of video. An incisive social and political critic, Mr. Greyson is in fact one of the leaders in the AIDS activist video movement, among others. Mr. Greyson has supported the practice in many ways and he influences many emerging artists." In 2013, Greyson released Murder in Passing, a murder mystery series which aired as 30-second episodes on Pattison Outdoor Advertising's video screens in the Toronto Transit Commission subway system and as a web series.

The Perils of Pedagogy: The Works of John Greyson was published in 2013. The book includes some of his writing as well as scholarly essays about his work from across his career. One essay quotes scholar Wyndham Wise saying that Greyson's work displays a "unique combination of wit and didacticism."

In 2020, he released the short film Prurient as part of the Greetings from Isolation project. In 2021, his experimental short International Dawn Chorus Day had its world premiere at the Berlin International Film Festival, where it won the Teddy Award for best LGBTQ-themed short film.

In 2022, Greyson’s eighth feature, Photo Booth, had its world premiere at the 15th Toronto Palestine Film Festival. The film follows two Palestinian queer activists, who, along with novelist Jean Genet, attempt to sabotage the Eurovision Song Contest, being held in Jericho. The film was billed as “a split-screen documentary opera,” and included interviews from Ghadir Shafie, Judith Butler, and Ali Abunimah, among others. Greyson describes Photo Booth as his “BDS manifesto.”

Greyson’s film Door Prize (2024) had its world premiere at the 2025 Images Festival in Toronto, Ontario. The film is about a trans bike courier, named Mars, who is killed by an SUV, and the true crime spectacle that follows his death.

== Notable films ==
=== Zero Patience ===
Zero Patience is a 1993 musical film which challenged AIDS orthodoxy. Zero Patience is a response particularly to Randy Shilts' 1987 book And the Band Played On, which notoriously (and erroneously) traced the arrival of HIV/AIDS in North America to a single person, a Canadian airline attendant named Gaetan Dugas. Based on a single flawed epidemiological cluster study, the conclusions of Shilts' book were very problematic for the narrative of blame they created, suggesting both that particular individuals were at fault (for example, that Dugas willfully spread HIV, although he actually died before the virus was identified and the study in which he participated was one of several that allowed scientists to determine that HIV was sexually transmitted) and that monogamy and the 'normalization' of gay male sexual practices were the proper and adequate response (as opposed to a focus on safer sex practices).

Zero Patience features a gay ghost named Patient Zero who returns to Toronto to hook up with Sir Richard Francis Burton who, through an "unfortunate encounter with the fountain of youth" has lived to become the Chief Taxidermist at the Museum of Natural History. Burton is engaged in creating a "Hall of Contagion." When he loses his central exhibit, the Düsseldorf Plague Rat, he casts around for a replacement, lighting upon Patient Zero. In a comedy of errors, Zero and Burton come together, fall in love and attempt to figure out what to do about Burton's earlier attempts to defame Zero as a "sexual serial killer."

A number of sub-plots centre around specific criticisms of the social response to AIDS by politicians, doctors and pharmaceutical companies. There is a not entirely sympathetic ACT UP group engaged in a protest against the manufacturer of ZP0 (a reference to AZT), a teacher who is losing his sight to CMV and several scenes involving his students, and a number of scenes involving the animal and human inhabitants of the dioramas in the Hall of Contagion. Most of these feature lively and thought-provoking musical numbers, but none have drawn critical attention as much as the "Butthole Duet" in which Burton's and Zero's anuses sing about the social perception of anal sex and its relationship to the discourses circulating around AIDS in the 1980s and early 1990s. Widely misunderstood by film reviewers, the song refers to a number of academic responses to the popular perception of AIDS as a "gay disease" and the now discredited belief that the anus was more vulnerable to HIV than the vagina, particularly Leo Bersani's article "Is the Rectum a Grave?" Bersani thoroughly discredits the notion that anal sex is inherently diseased; Greyson takes this one step further to argue that an unreasonable bias against anal sex is linked to patriarchy.

The central scene in Zero Patience, however, is probably the scene in which Zero looks through a microscope at a slide of his own blood. What he sees is the subject of an Esther Williams-like song-and-dance number throughout which Zero converses with Miss HIV (Michael Callen). Both lyrically and in conversation, Miss HIV informs Zero that he was not the first, that he did not bring HIV/AIDS to North America, and that his participation in the infamous cluster study helped to prove that HIV is transmissible by sex and thus place an emphasis on safer sex that saved countless lives.

=== Lilies ===
In 1996, Greyson released his most famous film, Lilies, an adaptation of Michel Marc Bouchard's play Les feluettes, ou un drame romantique. The film screened at numerous festivals, including Sundance, and received critical acclaim; it was nominated for 14 awards Genie Awards at the 17th ceremony, winning four, including Best Picture. The film also won a number of other awards, including the GLAAD Media Award for Outstanding Film.

Following the dual chronology of Bouchard's play, Greyson's film (for which Bouchard wrote the screenplay) moves between two time periods: the film's 'present' in 1952 and the events that took place in the town of Roberval, Quebec in 1912. The film begins with a visit by Bishop Bilodeau (Marcel Sabourin) to a prison chapel where he is supposed to hear the confession of convicted murderer Simon (Aubert Pallascio). Both men were at school together in 1912 when a fire supposedly set by Simon took the life of a third schoolmate, and Simon's lover, Vallier (Danny Gilmore). However, this apparently simple story become quickly more complicated when the prison chaplain (Ian D. Clark) and the prisoners lock Bilodeau into the confessional booth and proceed to stage the true story of Vallier's death before their captive's eyes.

=== Fig Trees ===
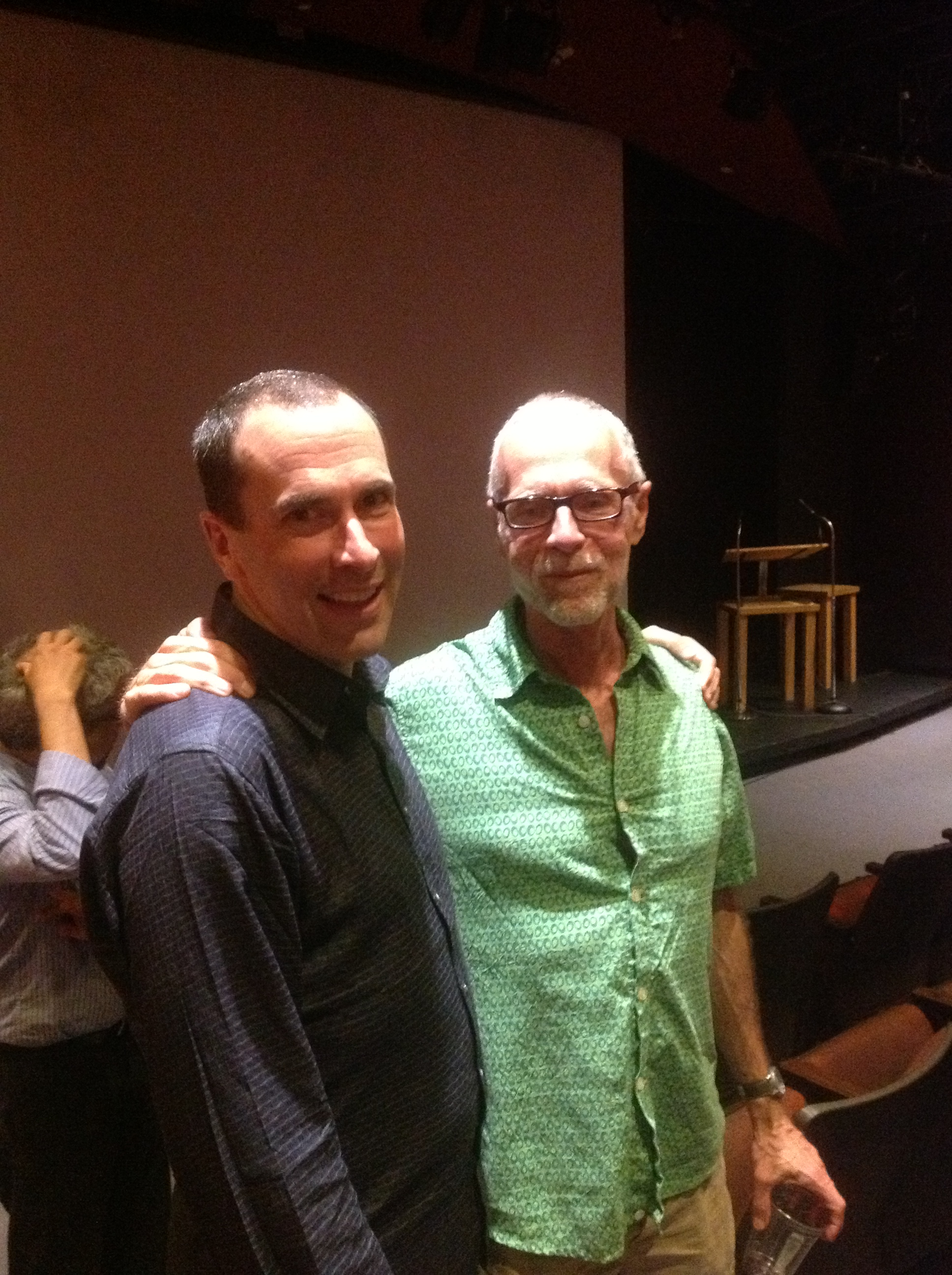
Greyson and Tim McCaskell in May 2013

Fig Trees is a feature-length documentary opera about the struggles of AIDS activists Tim McCaskell of Toronto and Zackie Achmat of Cape Town, as they fight for access to treatment drugs. In 1999, South African AIDS activist Zackie Achmat went on a treatment strike, refusing to take his pills until they were widely available to all South Africans. This symbolic act became a cause celebre, helping build his group Treatment Action Campaign into a national movement - yet with each passing month, Zackie grew sicker.

The feature film Fig Trees (2009) has been the recipient of a number of awards, including the Teddy for Best Documentary at the Berlinale, and the Best Canadian Feature award at the Toronto Inside Out Film Festival.

== Controversies ==
=== Opposition to 2009 TIFF for highlighting of Tel Aviv ===
In September 2009, Greyson withdrew his short documentary, Covered, from the Toronto International Film Festival (TIFF) festival to protest the festival's inaugural City to City Spotlight on the city of Tel Aviv. In a letter to TIFF Greyson wrote that his protest "isn't against the film or filmmakers" chosen but against the City to City program, specifically, and "the smug business-as-usual aura it promotes." Greyson cited an August 2008 article in the Canadian Jewish News in which Israeli consul-general Amir Gissin stated that Israel would have a major presence at the TIFF as a culmination of his year-long Brand Israel campaign to re-engineer the country's image and that TIFF should not be a participant in such a PR exercise. Greyson also argued that "my protest isn't against the films of filmmakers you've chosen... [but] is against the Spotlight itself" and the failure of the festival to include Palestinian voices. Greyson also wrote that he was protesting TIFF's decision "to pointedly ignore the international economic boycott campaign against Israel" and that "By ignoring this boycott, TIFF has emphatically taken sides – and in the process, forced every filmmaker and audience member who opposes the occupation to cross a type of picket line." He cited Israel's Gaza War and the expansion of settlements as reasons for his withdrawal, accusing the festival of: "an ostrich-like indifference to the realities (cinematic and otherwise) of the region", and comparing the Spotlight on Tel Aviv to "celebrating Montgomery buses in 1963 ... Chilean wines in 1973 ... or South African fruit in 1991".

Greyson's stance and the proceeding Toronto Declaration immediately triggered international debate.

==== Criticism ====
Greyson's actions drew criticism from a number of sources. Cameron Bailey, one of the festival's co-directors, stated that "The City to City series was conceived and curated entirely independently. There was no pressure from any outside source. Contrary to rumours or mistaken media reports, this focus is a product only of TIFF's programming decisions. We value that independence and would never compromise it." Bailey also argued that "[Mr. Greyson] writes that his protest isn't against the films or filmmakers we have chosen, but against the spotlight itself. By that reasoning, no films programmed within this series would have met his approval, no matter what they contained." Canadian filmmaker Simcha Jacobovici argued that Greyson's letter was "full of lies" and says the festival "shouldn't be intimidated by this coalition of lies."

Columnist George Jonas, writing in the National Post, argued that Greyson was engaging in "mental gymnastics," and described Greyson's line of reasoning as follows: "Who, us, objecting to Israeli films? Perish the thought. We're only objecting to Israeli propaganda. Okay; what's Israeli propaganda? Well, the Israeli films we're objecting to." Jonas also asked rhetorically "What Israeli film wouldn't be Israeli propaganda for Greyson?" Jonas also argued "To hear [Greyson] object to "state-subsidized propaganda" is ironic, to say the least. As an activist-filmmaker, he has been a propagandist for the values of the ultra-liberal state and its shibboleths throughout his career."

Robert Lantos, a Canadian film producer, sharply criticized Greyson, stating that "the (Toronto) festival has been free from the pressure of those whose fascist agenda is to impose their views on others, stifle the voices they don't like and interfere with people's right to see whatever they wish and make up their own minds. Until now." He also suggested that Greyson is "an opportunist eagerly leaping on the 'Israel apartheid' bandwagon in order to garner more attention for his film than it would have ever received had it played at the festival."

Greyson later posted a response to Lantos that was published in Rabble.ca. Greyson stated that "From the start, our protest was against the Tel Aviv Spotlight frame, not the films – so we emphatically stressed that we weren't boycotting either the films or filmmakers, or calling on anyone else to pull their films." Greyson also criticized "the opportunism of TIFF, which seems increasingly eager to court dubious partnerships, such as the Israeli consulate's Brand Israel Campaign" and asked "the extent of Israeli sponsorship." He accused Lantos of "hiding behind...inflammatory buzzwords"

Patrick Goldstein, a film critic and columnist for the Los Angeles Times wrote that he thinks "it's especially unhealthy to ... accuse a festival of being a propaganda vehicle, as the Toronto protesters have, just because it is promoting another country's film culture. Even though I happen to agree with Greyson that the Israeli occupation and the spread of illegal settlements is a terrible thing – both for the Palestinians and, in the long run, for Israel – I can't imagine a less auspicious forum for belittling any country's artistic accomplishments than a film festival." He concluded:

Everyone has a right to disapprove of and even scathingly criticize a country's politics. But I don't see how Israel's artists and its film industry are any more complicit in its treatment of the Palestinians than, well, American artists were complicit in our government's use of torture against suspected terrorists.
In his complaint to the festival, Greyson asked if "an uncritical celebration of Tel Aviv right now" wasn't akin to "celebrating Montgomery buses in 1963, California grapes in 1969, Chilean wines in 1973 ... or South African fruit in 1991?"
My answer would be: no way. Wine and grapes and fruit are agricultural products. Films are a product too, for sure, but they are also expressions of art and intellectual ferment. And once you begin to close the door in any way on artistic freedom, even if it simply involves pressuring a film festival to shun a country whose politics you disagree with, you might discover someday that it's a lot easier to shut the door to a free exchange of ideas than it is to open it up again.

A number of Hollywood celebrities circulated a letter on September 15, 2009, protesting a petition calling for a boycott of the Toronto International Film Festival over a Tel Aviv-themed event. The letter, which appeared simultaneously in the Los Angeles Times and the Toronto Star was signed, among others, by Jerry Seinfeld, Sacha Baron Cohen, Natalie Portman, Jason Alexander, Lisa Kudrow, Lenny Kravitz, Patricia Heaton, Jacob Richler, Noah Richler, George F. Walker, and Moses Znaimer. The letter said:

Anyone who has actually seen recent Israeli cinema, movies that are political and personal, comic and tragic, often critical, knows they are in no way a propaganda arm for any government policy. Blacklisting them only stifles the exchange of cultural knowledge that artists should be the first to defend and protect.

==== Support ====
A letter for support for Greyson, termed the Toronto Declaration, was signed by more than 50 people, including Israeli filmmaker Udi Aloni, director Ken Loach, musician David Byrne, actors Danny Glover and Jane Fonda, author Alice Walker and journalist Naomi Klein. The letter argues that:

The emphasis on 'diversity' in City to City is empty given the absence of Palestinian filmmakers in the program. Furthermore, what this description does not say is that Tel Aviv is built on destroyed Palestinian villages, and that the city of Jaffa, Palestine’s main cultural hub until 1948, was annexed to Tel Aviv after the mass exiling of the Palestinian population. This program ignores the suffering of thousands of former residents and descendants of the Tel Aviv/Jaffa area who currently live in refugee camps in the Occupied Territories or who have been dispersed to other countries, including Canada. Looking at modern, sophisticated Tel Aviv without also considering the city’s past and the realities of Israeli occupation of the West Bank and the Gaza strip, would be like rhapsodizing about the beauty and elegant lifestyles in white-only Cape Town or Johannesburg during apartheid without acknowledging the corresponding black townships of Khayelitsha and Soweto.

— The Toronto Declaration: No Celebration of Occupation

Jane Fonda would later reconsider her position and released a publicity statement on the matter. "I signed the letter without reading it carefully enough, without asking myself if some of the wording wouldn't exacerbate the situation rather than bring about constructive dialogue," Fonda wrote on the Huffington Post website. She added that the suffering of both sides should be articulated.

Journalist, author and activist Naomi Klein went on to write an op-ed piece in The Globe and Mail, clarifying the intention of the support of Greyson's stance articulated in the Toronto Declaration: "Contrary to the many misrepresentations, the letter is not calling for a boycott of the festival. It is a simple message of solidarity that says: We don't feel like partying with Israel this year."

Greyson's act was termed "courageous" by Judy Rebick who argued that it "is a significant contribution to the Palestinian solidarity movement and the Boycott Divestment and Sanction strategy that it has adopted to shine a light on the inexcusable aggression of Israel against the Palestinian people." Palestinian director Annemarie Jacir, agreed with Greyson's stance and argued that the planned Tel Aviv spotlight will ignore Palestinian filmmakers who live in Tel Aviv and "even more importantly those who are indigenous to that specific area and whose families were exiled and ethnically cleansed from Jaffa/Tel Aviv."

Elle Flanders, a Toronto-based self-described filmmaker who grew up in Israel, also supported Greyson, stating that "We have been accused of politicizing culture but it has been the festival and the Israeli government that has done this." She also stated that the protest was "wildly misconstrued by opposing voices" and that "We in fact defend Israeli filmmakers' rights to screen along with the rest of the festival, rather than as representatives of their government."

=== Participation in Gaza Flotilla ===
In summer 2011, Greyson traveled to Greece to participate in the Freedom Flotilla II, specifically joining with the "Tahrir," the Canadian member of the Flotilla.

=== Arrest in Egypt ===
In the summer of 2013, Greyson traveled to Egypt, where he and Dr. Tarek Loubani, a 33-year-old emergency room doctor from London, Ontario, were detained without charges, in a cell with 38 other people. Reports indicate the two were on their way to Gaza to carry out medical relief work, but were forced to remain in Cairo as the crossing was closed. They remained in detention from August 16 to October 5, 2013. Greyson's union, the York University Faculty Association, ran a campaign via LabourStart in an effort to force the Egyptian government to release him. Greyson and Loubani began a hunger strike on September 16 to protest their treatment.

The Canadian government announced on October 5 that Greyson and Loubani had been released, however they were unable to board a flight to Frankfurt due to remaining on a no-fly list issued by government prosecutors. On October 10, Greyson and Loubani were cleared for departure and left Egypt for home the next day.

In September 2025, Greyson signed an open pledge with Film Workers for Palestine pledging not to work with Israeli film institutions "that are implicated in genocide and apartheid against the Palestinian people."

== Personal life ==
Greyson is openly gay. His partner is Canadian visual artist Stephen Andrews, with whom he has lived since the 1990s. They have been referred to as a "power couple" in Canada's art scene. In 2017, the Art Gallery of Ontario installed a retrospective of Andrews' work exploring AIDS, surveillance, war, memory and chaos theory.

== Awards ==
- The University of Toronto's Citizenship Award, for contribution to awareness and education around issues of sexual diversity
- Fellow of the Royal Society of Canada
- Teddy Award for Best Essay Film for Urinal (1989 Berlin International Film Festival)
- Teddy Jury Award for Making of Monsters (1991 Berlin International Film Festival)
- Toronto International Film Festival Award for Best Canadian Short Film for Making of Monsters (1991)
- Toronto International Film Festival Award for Best Canadian Feature Film for Zero Patience (1993)
- Genie Award for Best Motion Picture for Lilies (1996)
- Montreal World Film Festival Award for Best Canadian Film for Lilies (1996)
- Cinéfest Sudbury International Film Festival Best Canadian Film Award (1993)
- 2000 Toronto Arts Award for film/video
- Gemini Award for Best Director, Made in Canada (2002)
- Bell Award in Video Art (2007)
- Teddy Award for Best Documentary for Fig Trees (2009 Berlin International Film Festival)

== Filmography ==
=== Shorts ===
| Year | Title | Notes | Source |
| 1977 | My Family | | |
| 1979 | The Visitation | | |
| 1980 | The First Draft | | |
| 1982 | Breathing Through Opposing Nostrils | | |
| 1983 | Disrupting Diplomacy | Co-directed by Mary Anne Yanulis, Annie Lieberman, Lauren Helf. | |
| 1983 | Manzana por Manzana | Co-directed by Eric Shultz, Mary Anne Yanulis. | |
| 1984 | The Perils of Pedagogy | Part One of “The Kipling Trilogy” | |
| 1984 | Changing the Current | | |
| 1985 | To Pick is Not to Choose | | |
| 1985 | The Jungle Boy | Part Two of “The Kipling Trilogy” | |
| 1985 | Kipling Meets the Cowboys | Part Three of “The Kipling Trilogy” | |
| 1986 | You Taste American | | |
| 1986 | A Moffie Called Simon | Greyson’s first 16mm film. | |
| 1986 | Moscow Does Not Believe in Queers | | |
| 1987 | The ADS Epidemic | Produced for Public Access’ “Lunatic of One Idea” project. | |
| 1989 | The Pink Pimpernel | Retelling of The Scarlet Pimpernel | |
| 1989 | Four Safer Sex Shorts By Famous Dead Artists | Excerpted from The Pink Pimpernel | |
| 1990 | No Way Charlie Brown | Created by Staten Island Community TV workshop group facilitated by Greyson | |
| 1991 | The Making of “Monsters” | | |
| 1992 | Letter to Ray Navarro | | |
| 1998 | Herr | Adapted to video from Joe Laughlin’s 1997 dance piece Harold, Billy, Stan and Jack | |
| 1999 | This is Nothing | | |
| 2000 | Topping | | |
| 2001 | Nunca | | |
| 2001 | Packin’ | | |
| 2001 | The Sixth Room | Co-directed with David Wall | |
| 2002 | It Takes Two | | |
| 2003 | Two Tables | Created for Trinity Square Video’s Olive Project. | |
| 2003 | Motet for Zackie | | |
| 2003 | PILS SLIP | | |
| 2004 | Motet for Amplified Voices | | |
| 2005 | Albino | | |
| 2006 | On Message | Co-directed with Stephen Andrews | |
| 2007 | Abbott Has No Pride | | |
| 2008 | 14.3 Seconds | | |
| 2008 | CUPE 3903 Thriller | | |
| 2009 | Covered | English and Bosnian (subtitled) | |
| 2009 | Rex vs. Singh | Co-written and co-directed with Richard Fung, Ali Kazimi | |
| 2009 | Roy and Silo’s Starter Home | Part of the Leona Drive Project | |
| 2010 | G7 vs. G8 | | |
| 2010 | Why Rain? | | |
| 2010 | Captifs d’amour | | |
| 2010 | Hey Elton | | |
| 2010 | Vuvuzela | | |
| 2010 | The Ballad of Roy and Silo | | |
| 2011 | BDS Bieber | | |
| 2011 | Teddy Tribute | | |
| 2011 | Gaza Island | | |
| 2011 | Green Laser | | |
| 2013 | Prison Arabic in 50 Days | Arabic and English | |
| 2014 | Gazonto | | |
| 2018 | Mercurial | CBC | |
| 2021 | International Dawn Chorus Day | | |
| 2023 | DEATH MASK | Co-directed with Njo Kong Kie | |

=== Feature ===
| Year | Title | Notes | Source |
| 1988 | Urinal (Pissoir) | | |
| 1993 | Zero Patience | | |
| 1996 | Lilies | Screenplay adapted by Michel Marc Bouchard and Linda Gaboriau from Bouchard’s play of the same name | |
| 1997 | Uncut | | |
| 2000 | The Law of Enclosures | Adapted from the 1996 novel of the same name by Dale Peck | |
| 2003 | Proteus | Co-written and co-directed with Jack Lewis | |
| 2009 | Fig Trees | | |
| 2022 | Photo Booth | | |
| 2024 | Door Prize | | |

=== Television ===
| Year | Title | Notes | Source |
| 1988 | Angry Initiatives, Defiant Strategies | Producer; A Deep Dish TV Special | |
| 1989 | The World is Sick (sic) | Co-directed by Michael Balser for Toronto Living With AIDS cable access series | |
| 1989 | The Great AZT Debate | Co-directed by Michael Balser for Toronto Living With AIDS cable access series | |
| 1995 | After the Bath | CBC Newsworld Documentary | |
| 1998 | Welcome to Paradox | Director; Episodes: “Blue Champagne”, “Options” | |
| 2001 | Drop the Beat | Director; Episodes: “Fallen Hero”, “Trigger Man” | |
| 2001–2002 | Queer as Folk | Director; Episodes: “Daddy Dearest (Sonny Boy)”, “Move It or Lose It”, “All Better Now”, “It’s Because I’m Gay, Right?” | |
| 2001–2003 | Made in Canada | Director; Episodes: “Tax Audit”, “Roomies”, “Babes with Blades”, “Requiem for Beaver Creek” | |
| 2004 | Paradise Falls | Director; Episodes: “Deep Cuts”, “The Dark Side”, “A Woman’s Scorn”, “Bottom’s Up” | |
