= Donald Brittain Award =

Canadian television award

- Country: Canada
- Presented by: Academy of Canadian Cinema & Television
- First award: 1991
- Currently held by: The Fifth Estate: "The Shadow War on Libraries" (2025)
- Website: academy.ca/awards

The Donald Brittain Award is a Canadian television award, presented by the Academy of Canadian Cinema and Television to honour the year's best television documentary on a social or political topic. Formerly presented as part of the Gemini Awards, since 2013 it has been presented as part of the Canadian Screen Awards. The award may be presented to either a standalone broadcast of a documentary film, or to an individual full-length episode of a news or documentary series; documentary films which originally premiered theatrically, but were not already submitted for consideration in a CSA film category before being broadcast on television, are also considered television films for the purposes of the award.

The award is named in honour of Donald Brittain, a pioneering Canadian documentary filmmaker. On one occasion to date, the award has been won by a documentary film about Brittain and his importance to the history of Canadian documentary film.

== Nominees and winners ==
=== 1990s ===
Year	Film	Nominee(s)	Ref
1991; 6th Gemini Awards
1991; 6th Gemini Awards	Island of Whales	George Johnson, Jack Silberman, Gillian Darling, Jerry Appleton	
1991; 6th Gemini Awards	Between Two Worlds	Peter Raymont	
1991; 6th Gemini Awards	Distress Signals	Kent Martin, John Walker, Tom Perlmutter	
1991; 6th Gemini Awards	James Bay: The Wind That Keeps Blowing	Nancy Archibald	
1991; 6th Gemini Awards	Transplant: The Breath of Life	Elias Petras	
1992; 7th Gemini Awards
1992; 7th Gemini Awards	Timothy Findley: Anatomy of a Writer	Terence Macartney-Filgate, Don Haig	
1992; 7th Gemini Awards	Man Alive: "Chernobyl 2"	Halya Kuchmij	
1992; 7th Gemini Awards	On the Eighth Day: Perfecting Mother Nature	Mary Armstrong	
1992; 7th Gemini Awards	Threads of Hope	Les Harris, Jane Harris	
1992; 7th Gemini Awards	Women in the Shadows	Signe Johansson, Christine Welsh	
1993; 8th Gemini Awards
1993; 8th Gemini Awards	Donald Brittain: Filmmaker	Adam Symansky	
1993; 8th Gemini Awards	Adrienne Clarkson Presents: "Artemesia"	Adrienne Clarkson	
1993; 8th Gemini Awards	Man Alive: "Held Hostage"	Halya Kuchmij	
1993; 8th Gemini Awards	The Fifth Estate: "Odd Man Out"	Susan Teskey	
1993; 8th Gemini Awards	The Nature of Things: "Trading Futures"	Michael Poole	
1994; 9th Gemini Awards
1994; 9th Gemini Awards	Shadows and Light: Joaquin Rodrigo at 90	Larry Weinstein, Niv Fichman	
1994; 9th Gemini Awards	Dream Tower	Ron Mann	
1994; 9th Gemini Awards	Hidden Children	Julia Sereny	
1994; 9th Gemini Awards	No Man's Land	Shelley Saywell	
1994; 9th Gemini Awards	Romeo and Juliet in Sarajevo	John Zaritsky, Virginia Storring	
1995; 10th Gemini Awards
1995; 10th Gemini Awards	Ms. Conceptions	Linda Frum, Ric Esther Bienstock	
1995; 10th Gemini Awards	The Fifth Estate: "Sealed in Silence"	David Kaufman	
1995; 10th Gemini Awards	The Last Trip	Ina Fichman	
1995; 10th Gemini Awards	The Negotiator	Laszlo Barna	
1995; 10th Gemini Awards	Orphans of Manchuria	Annie Dodds	
1995; 10th Gemini Awards	The Voyage of the St. Louis	Arnie Gelbart	
1996; 11th Gemini Awards
1996; 11th Gemini Awards	Utshimassits: Place of the Boss	John Walker, Mike Mahoney, Peter d'Entremont	
1996; 11th Gemini Awards	Fire and Water	Shelley Saywell	
1996; 11th Gemini Awards	Scenes from a Corner Store	Sun-Kyung Yi	
1996; 11th Gemini Awards	Summer in the Cherry Orchard	Ann Bromley	
1996; 11th Gemini Awards	The True Story of Linda M.	Norma Bailey, Joe MacDonald	
1997; 12th Gemini Awards
1997; 12th Gemini Awards	The Selling of Innocents	Elliott Halpern, Simcha Jacobovici, William Cobban	
1997; 12th Gemini Awards	My Russian Campaign: From Montreal to Moscow	John Curtin	
1997; 12th Gemini Awards	Mystics, Mechanics and Mindbombs	Michael Chechik, Jerry Thompson	
1997; 12th Gemini Awards	Nowhere Else to Live	Alan Handel	
1997; 12th Gemini Awards	Picturing a People: George Johnston Tlingit Photographer	George Hargrave, Sally Bochner	
1998; 13th Gemini Awards
1998; 13th Gemini Awards	Gerrie & Louise	Phyllis Brown, Sturla Gunnarsson, David York	
1998; 13th Gemini Awards	Confessions of a Rabid Dog	Rudy Buttignol, Gerry Flahive, Julia Sereny	
1998; 13th Gemini Awards	Dad	Chris Triffo	
1998; 13th Gemini Awards	Some Kind of Arrangement	Geeta Sondhi	
1998; 13th Gemini Awards	Witness: "Between Here and Heaven"	Andrew Gregg, Wayne Abbott	
1999; 14th Gemini Awards
1999; 14th Gemini Awards	Crimes of Honour	Shelley Saywell	
1999; 14th Gemini Awards	Believing	Nicole Lamothe	
1999; 14th Gemini Awards	The Dragon's Egg	Rudy Buttignol, Allan King, Elizabeth Yake	
1999; 14th Gemini Awards	East Side Showdown	Peter Starr	
1999; 14th Gemini Awards	Four Women of Egypt	Éric Michel	

=== 2000s ===
Year	Film	Nominee(s)	Ref
2000; 15th Gemini Awards
2000; 15th Gemini Awards	Deep Inside Clint Star	Silva Basmajian	
2000; 15th Gemini Awards	Asylum: Falling Through the Cracks	Christopher Sumpton	
2000; 15th Gemini Awards	Kikkik	Ole Gjerstad	
2000; 15th Gemini Awards	Legacy of Terror: The Bombing of Air India	Rudy Buttignol, Shelley Saywell	
2000; 15th Gemini Awards	The Holier It Gets	Rudy Buttignol, Jennifer Baichwal, Nicholas de Pencier	
2001; 16th Gemini Awards
2001; 16th Gemini Awards	Breakaway: A Tale of Two Survivors	Johanna Lunn Montgomery, Johanna Eliot, Mathew Welsh	
2001; 16th Gemini Awards	Chickens Are People Too	John Kastner, Hilary Armstrong, Marie Natanson, Charlotte Odele	
2001; 16th Gemini Awards	In the Shadow of a Saint	Mark Johnston, Stephen Milton	
2001; 16th Gemini Awards	Kim Campbell: Through the Looking Glass	Silva Basmajian	
2001; 16th Gemini Awards	A Moment in Time: The United Colours of Bronstein	Judy Jackson	
2002; 17th Gemini Awards
2002; 17th Gemini Awards	Offspring	Barry Stevens, Laszlo Barna	
2002; 17th Gemini Awards	Aftermath: The Remnants of War	Peter Starr, Ed Barreveld, Michael Kot	
2002; 17th Gemini Awards	Culture Jam: Hijacking Commercial Culture	Jill Sharpe, Lynn Booth	
2002; 17th Gemini Awards	In the Line of Fire	Patricia Naylor	
2002; 17th Gemini Awards	Waging Peace: A Year in the Life of Caledonia Junior High	Sally Bochner, Peter d'Entremont, Kent Martin	
2003; 18th Gemini Awards
2003; 18th Gemini Awards	Return to Kandahar	Paul Jay, Nelofer Pazira, David M. Ostriker	
2003; 18th Gemini Awards	Chinese Daughters	Dorlene Lin, Rudy Buttignol	
2003; 18th Gemini Awards	Salvation	Kent Martin	
2003; 18th Gemini Awards	Seeing Is Believing	Francis Miquet, Peter Wintonick, Katerina Cizek, Catherine Olsen	
2003; 18th Gemini Awards	The Tree That Remembers	Sally Bochner	
2004; 19th Gemini Awards
2004; 19th Gemini Awards	Dying at Grace	Allan King, Rudy Buttignol	
2004; 19th Gemini Awards	Deadline Iraq: Uncensored	Stuart Coxe, Greg Kelly, Douglas Arrowsmith, Eric Foss, Aaron Williams	
2004; 19th Gemini Awards	Dying to Be Free: Zimbabwe's Struggle for Change	David Belluz	
2004; 19th Gemini Awards	Short Infinity	Jean Lemire, Yves Bisaillon	
2004; 19th Gemini Awards	The Man Who Could Be King	Mark Johnston, Edith Champagne, Nancy Ing Duclos	
2005; 20th Gemini Awards
2005; 20th Gemini Awards	Runaway Grooms	Ali Kazimi	
2005; 20th Gemini Awards	El Contrato	Karen King-Chigbo	
2005; 20th Gemini Awards	No Place Called Home	Peter Starr	
2005; 20th Gemini Awards	One More River	Ernest Webb, Catherine Bainbridge	
2005; 20th Gemini Awards	Rage Against the Darkness	Deborah Parks, John Kastner	
2005; 20th Gemini Awards	The Take	Avi Lewis, Naomi Klein, Laszlo Barna, Silva Basmajian	
2006; 21st Gemini Awards
2006; 21st Gemini Awards	House Calls	Gerry Flahive, Silva Basmajian	
2006; 21st Gemini Awards	Beyond Words: Photographers of War	Eric Foss, Stuart Coxe, Greg Kelly	
2006; 21st Gemini Awards	Big Sugar	Stephen Phizicky, Sylvia Wilson, Arnie Gelbart	
2006; 21st Gemini Awards	Memory for Max, Claire, Ida and Company	Kathy Avrich-Johnson, Allan King, Rudy Buttignol	
2006; 21st Gemini Awards	No More Tears Sister	Pierre Lapointe, Sally Bochner	
2007; 22nd Gemini Awards
2007; 22nd Gemini Awards	Fatherland	Manfred Becker, Laszlo Barna	
2007; 22nd Gemini Awards	Bombay Calling	Sally Bochner, Adam Symansky	
2007; 22nd Gemini Awards	Cottonland	Annette Clarke, Kent Martin	
2007; 22nd Gemini Awards	EMPz 4 Life	Kathy Avrich-Johnson, Rudy Buttignol, Allan King	
2007; 22nd Gemini Awards	Faith Without Fear	Silva Basmajian, Gordon Henderson	
2007; 22nd Gemini Awards	Martyr Street	Deborah Parks, Shelley Saywell	
2008; 23rd Gemini Awards
2008; 23rd Gemini Awards	A Promise to the Dead: The Exile Journey of Ariel Dorfman	Peter Raymont	
2008; 23rd Gemini Awards	A Place Between: The Story of an Adoption	Joe MacDonald, Graydon McRea, Michael Scott, Derek Mazur	
2008; 23rd Gemini Awards	Darfur: On Our Watch	Neil Docherty, Lisa Ellenwood	
2008; 23rd Gemini Awards	Forgiveness: Stories for Our Time	Johanna Lunn, Kent Martin	
2008; 23rd Gemini Awards	Girl Inside	Maya Gallus, Justine Pimlott	
2009; 24th Gemini Awards
2009; 24th Gemini Awards	Tiger Spirit	Ed Barreveld, Anita Lee, Min Sook Lee	
2009; 24th Gemini Awards	Air India 182	David York, Sturla Gunnarsson	
2009; 24th Gemini Awards	bploi wai dtaai: Leave Her to Die	Antonia Thomson, Sean Buckley	
2009; 24th Gemini Awards	Norm	Kent Nason, Teresa MacInnes	
2009; 24th Gemini Awards	Triage: Dr. James Orbinski's Humanitarian Dilemma	Peter Raymont, Silva Basmajian	

=== 2010s ===
Year	Film	Filmmakers	Ref
2010; 25th Gemini Awards
2010; 25th Gemini Awards	Broke	Rosvita Dransfeld	
2010; 25th Gemini Awards	A Dream for Kabul	Patricia Bergeron, Yves Bisaillon, Nathalie Barton	
2010; 25th Gemini Awards	Reel Injun	Christina Fon, Catherine Bainbridge, Catherine Olsen, Ravida Din, Adam Symansky, Ernest Webb, Linda Ludwick	
2010; 25th Gemini Awards	Up Against the Wall	Eileen Thalenberg, Gail McIntyre	
2010; 25th Gemini Awards	Water on the Table	Liz Marshall	
2011; 26th Gemini Awards
2011; 26th Gemini Awards	Life with Murder	John Kastner, Silva Basmajian	
2011; 26th Gemini Awards	Jackpot	Michelle Latimer	
2011; 26th Gemini Awards	Mom's Home	Maureen Judge	
2011; 26th Gemini Awards	Tipping Point: The Age of the Oil Sands	Niobe Thompson	
2011; 26th Gemini Awards	When We Were Boys	Mark Johnston, Amanda Handy, Sarah Goodman	
2012; 1st Canadian Screen Awards
2012; 1st Canadian Screen Awards	About Her	Sissy Federer-Less, Michelle Rothstein, Scott Garvie, Alison Gordon, Phyllis Ellis, Christina Jennings, Henry Less	
2012; 1st Canadian Screen Awards	8th Fire	Paul Morin, Sue Dando, Peter John Ingles, Jo-Ann Demers, Kelly Crichton	
2012; 1st Canadian Screen Awards	The Market	Ed Barreveld	
2012; 1st Canadian Screen Awards	Prosecutor	Lea Marin, Silva Basmajian, Julia Bennett, Kelly Jenkins, Peter Raymont	
2012; 1st Canadian Screen Awards	The Team	Kelly Jenkins, Peter Raymont, Patrick Reed	
2013; 2nd Canadian Screen Awards
2013; 2nd Canadian Screen Awards	The People of the Kattawapiskak River	Alanis Obomsawin, Ravida Din	
2013; 2nd Canadian Screen Awards	Blood Relative	Nimisha Mukerji	
2013; 2nd Canadian Screen Awards	Herman's House	Angad Singh Bhalla, Ed Barreveld, Lisa Valencia-Svensson, Loring McAlpin	
2014; 3rd Canadian Screen Awards
2014; 3rd Canadian Screen Awards	Tales from the Organ Trade	Ric Esther Bienstock, Felix Golubev, Simcha Jacobovici	
2014; 3rd Canadian Screen Awards	The Exhibition	Robert Straight, Damon Vignale, Miho Yamamoto	
2014; 3rd Canadian Screen Awards	The Ghosts in Our Machine	Liz Marshall, Nina Beveridge	
2014; 3rd Canadian Screen Awards	Out of Mind, Out of Sight	Silva Basmajian, John Kastner, Deborah Parks	
2015; 4th Canadian Screen Awards
2015; 4th Canadian Screen Awards	Sugar Coated	Janice Dawe, Michèle Hozer	
2015; 4th Canadian Screen Awards	15 to Life: Kenneth's Story	Nadine Pequeneza	
2015; 4th Canadian Screen Awards	Anti-Social Limited	Rosvita Dransfeld	
2015; 4th Canadian Screen Awards	Danny	Annette Clarke, William D. MacGillivray, Justin Simms	
2015; 4th Canadian Screen Awards	Human Harvest	Leon Lee, Jason Loftus	
2016; 5th Canadian Screen Awards
2016; 5th Canadian Screen Awards	Guantanamo's Child	Patrick Reed, Michelle Shephard, Peter Raymont	
2016; 5th Canadian Screen Awards	After the Last River	Vicki Lean, Jade Blair	
2016; 5th Canadian Screen Awards	I, Pedophile	Matthew Campea, Christopher Sumpton, Robin Benger	
2016; 5th Canadian Screen Awards	The War at Home	Deborah Parks, Shelley Saywell	
2017; 6th Canadian Screen Awards
2017; 6th Canadian Screen Awards	The Secret Path	Stuart Coxe, Mike Downie, Jocelyn Hamilton, Gord Downie, Justin Stephenson, Jeff Lemire, Sarah Polley, Patrick Downie	
2017; 6th Canadian Screen Awards	All Governments Lie: Truth, Deception and the Spirit of I. F. Stone	Fred Peabody, Peter Raymont, Steve Ord, Andrew Munger, Jeff Cohen, Oliver Stone	
2017; 6th Canadian Screen Awards	Colonization Road	Michelle St. John, Brendan Brady, Jordan O'Connor, Shane Belcourt, Evan Adams	
2017; 6th Canadian Screen Awards	Migrant Dreams	Min Sook Lee, Lisa Valencia-Svensson	
2017; 6th Canadian Screen Awards	The Skin We're In	Gordon Henderson, Stuart Henderson	
2018; 7th Canadian Screen Awards
2018; 7th Canadian Screen Awards	Quiet Killing (Ce silence qui tue)	Michèle Rouleau	
2018; 7th Canadian Screen Awards	Driving with Selvi	Elisa Paloschi	
2018; 7th Canadian Screen Awards	The Heat: A Kitchen (R)evolution	Maya Gallus	
2018; 7th Canadian Screen Awards	The Way Out	David York, Bryn Hughes, Michelle Shephard	
2019; 8th Canadian Screen Awards
2019; 8th Canadian Screen Awards	Mr. Jane and Finch	Alison Duke, Ngardy Conteh George	
2019; 8th Canadian Screen Awards	In Search of a Perfect World	Kristina McLaughlin, Kevin McMahon, Michael McMahon	
2019; 8th Canadian Screen Awards	The Invisible Heart	Nadine Pequeneza	
2019; 8th Canadian Screen Awards	Village of the Missing	Paul Kemp	

=== 2020s ===
Year	Film	Filmmakers	Ref
2020; 9th Canadian Screen Awards
2020; 9th Canadian Screen Awards	9/11 Kids	Steve Gamester, Michael Kot, Betty Orr, Elizabeth St. Philip	
2020; 9th Canadian Screen Awards	Above the Law	Geoff Morrison, Marc Serpa Francoeur, Robinder Uppal	
2020; 9th Canadian Screen Awards	Assholes: A Theory	Ann Bernier, Annette Clarke, John Walker	
2020; 9th Canadian Screen Awards	Meat the Future	Liz Marshall, Janice Dawe, Chris Hegedus	
2020; 9th Canadian Screen Awards	The Walrus and the Whistleblower	Frederic Bohbot, Nathalie Bibeau	
2021; 10th Canadian Screen Awards
2021; 10th Canadian Screen Awards	Ghosts of Afghanistan	Arnie Gelbart, Julian Sher, Natalie Dubois	
2021; 10th Canadian Screen Awards	Big News	Catherine Legge, Saman Malik, Michelle Mètivier, Sarah Peterson, Michael Gruzuk	
2021; 10th Canadian Screen Awards	Dispatches from a Field Hospital	Matt Gallagher, Cornelia Principe	
2021; 10th Canadian Screen Awards	No Responders Left Behind	Rob Lindsay, Jaime Sanchez, Kelly Zemnickis, Kristine Yanoff	
2021; 10th Canadian Screen Awards	We Know the Truth: Stories to Inspire Reconciliation	Meagan Fiddler, Bertram Schneider	
2022; 11th Canadian Screen Awards
2022; 11th Canadian Screen Awards	The Pretendians	Drew Hayden Taylor, Paul Kemp	
2022; 11th Canadian Screen Awards	Come Clean	Derreck Roemer, Neil Graham	
2022; 11th Canadian Screen Awards	Dear Jackie	Henri Pardo, Katarina Soukup	
2022; 11th Canadian Screen Awards	Marketplace: "Crisis in Home Care"	Tiffany Foxcroft	
2022; 11th Canadian Screen Awards	My Indian Name	Abraham Cote, Jason Brennan	
2023; 12th Canadian Screen Awards
2023; 12th Canadian Screen Awards	Coming Home: Wanna Icipus Kupi	Jennifer Podemski, Ernest Webb, Tanya Brunel, Michelle van Beusekom, Daniel Morin, Catherine Bainbridge, Linda Ludwick	
2023; 12th Canadian Screen Awards	Category Woman	Howard Fraiberg	
2023; 12th Canadian Screen Awards	Marketplace: "Mortgage Fraud Caught on Camera"	Tiffany Foxcroft, Nelisha Vellani	
2023; 12th Canadian Screen Awards	Naked: Sex and Gender	Michael McMahon, Kevin McMahon, Kay Siering	
2023; 12th Canadian Screen Awards	The Passionate Eye: "Inside the Statue Wars"	Steve Gamester, Yuma Dean Hester, Elizabeth St. Philip, Michael Kot	
2024; 13th Canadian Screen Awards
2024; 13th Canadian Screen Awards	The Fifth Estate: "Contract to Kill"	Raj Ahluwalia, Allya Davidson	
2024; 13th Canadian Screen Awards	Against All Odds: The Unstoppable Story of Toronto’s Mount Sinai Hospital	Mark Selby, Barry Avrich	
2024; 13th Canadian Screen Awards	APTN Investigates: "Food for Profit"	Tom Fennario, Brittany Guyot, Paul Barnsley, Allya Davidson, Ivan Angelovski, Steven D'Souza, Lisa Ellenwood, Linda Guerriero	
2024; 13th Canadian Screen Awards	S-yéwyáw: Awaken	Ecko Aleck, Liz Marshall, Alfonso Salinas, Charlene SanJenko	
2024; 13th Canadian Screen Awards	An Unfinished Journey	Nadine Pequeneza, Charlotte Uzu	
2025; 14th Canadian Screen Awards
2025; 14th Canadian Screen Awards	The Fifth Estate: "The Shadow War on Libraries"	Allya Davidson, Emmanuel Marchand, Rachel Ward, Grant LaFleche	
2025; 14th Canadian Screen Awards	The Good Canadian	Leena Minifie, David Paperny, Sarah Jane Flynn	
2025; 14th Canadian Screen Awards	Marketplace: "The Secret Cost of Housing"	Jeremy McDonald, Nelisha Vellani, Sneha Agrawal, Tomi Joseph Raji	
2025; 14th Canadian Screen Awards	The Ozempic Effect: Beyond The Waistline	Paul Kemp, C. Hudson Hwang, AJ Leitch	
2025; 14th Canadian Screen Awards	W5's Avery Haines Investigates: "Our Son the Terror Suspect"	Avery Haines, Joseph Loeiro	

== See also ==
- Canadian television awards
