= Storyline Entertainment =

Storyline Entertainment may refer to:

- an American film studio founded by Craig Zadan and Neil Meron
- a Canadian documentary film studio founded by Ed Barreveld, Daniel Sekulich, and Michael Kot
