= The Black Phone (soundtrack) =

The Black Phone (Original Motion Picture Soundtrack)

Film score by Mark Korven
- Released: June 24, 2022
- Recorded: 2021–2022
- Genre: Film score
- Length: 49:34
- Label: Back Lot Music
- Producer: Mark Korven

Mark Korven chronology
Resident Evil: Welcome to Raccoon City (2021)	The Black Phone (Original Motion Picture Soundtrack) (2022)	Night Swim (2024)

The Black Phone (Original Motion Picture Soundtrack) is the soundtrack to the 2021 film The Black Phone, directed by Scott Derrickson. The film's musical score is composed by Mark Korven and released through Back Lot Music on June 24, 2022. It is a culmination of modern and vintage sounds utilized with synthesizers and string instruments, which are primarily focused on the film's antagonist, The Grabber, whose soundscape accompanied creepy horror music. The score was positively received by critics.

== Development ==
The Black Phone came to composer Mark Korven's attention once his agent and Blumhouse had correspondence. He met Derrickson in a Zoom session with the latter liking his attitude and musical style and asked him to be onboard. He wanted to make it really creepy but also should sound contemporary and different steering away from the film's pastiche musical approach, as well as incorporating vintage musical styles from the 1980s, calling for a score drawing on modern and vintage synthesizer sound. As the film was under post-production, Korven developed general sketches being sent to Scott and his approval would depend on proceeding with the score or not.

The period setting served as the subtext, which Korven did not want to reflect with that but to play to the characters. He used "friction mallets" which were like Super Balls being rubbed with specific objects, to create creepy "friction sounds" for The Grabber, and used numerous strings which were unconventionally played. He also used the apprehension engine for developing the specific friction sounds. The other characters were of minor focus, except for Gwen's character which had "lighter, more feminine sounds".

Alongside synthesizers, Korven also used string instruments for the emotional moments in the conclusion, where he tried "to be earnest and less melodramatic" in contrast to the reverberating and echoed unnerving sounds. The idea was to create a completely acoustic instrument for developing core soundscapes, but Korven played it organically within a finger touch instead of computerized sounds manipulated on a keyboard.

== Critical reception ==
A review from The Film Scorer summarized "Korven's score always returns to familiar territory, his endless box of noisy terrors." Hasitha Fernando of Flickering Myth wrote "Fluctuating 'tween pulse-pounding nightmare fuel and mellow atmospheric soundscape, Korven's music certainly does some significant heavy lifting when it comes to amplifying the mood of a scene." Ayaan Paul Chowdhury of India Today wrote "composer Mark Korven's riveting score pulls everything and everyone closer and closer to the truth." William Jones of Comic Book Resources called it as "jarring and fundamentally upsetting score". Mark Burger of Yes! Weekly opined that Korven's score aided the film.

== Track listing ==
The Black Phone (Original Motion Picture Soundtrack) track listing
No.	Title	Length
1.	"Main Title"	1:14
2.	"Abduction"	1:13
3.	"The Grabber"	3:58
4.	"Getting to Know You"	2:42
5.	"Flashback / Don't Go Upstairs"	4:08
6.	"Billy's Phone Call"	2:54
7.	"Rope Escape"	2:08
8.	"Her Mother's Story"	1:30
9.	"I Almost Let You Go"	2:31
10.	"The Grabber Awakes"	6:48
11.	"Knife Tattoo"	2:38
12.	"Finn's Despair"	4:19
13.	"Preparing to Fight"	3:28
14.	"The Grabber Takes His Time"	2:27
15.	"Climax"	2:09
16.	"Final Chapter"	5:27
Total length:		49:34

== Accolades ==
Accolades for The Black Phone (Original Motion Picture Soundtrack)
Year	Award	Category	Nominee(s)	Result	Ref.
2022	Hollywood Music in Media Awards	Original Score — Horror Film	Mark Korven	Nominated	
