= Donovan Webster =

American journalist (1959–2018)

Donovan James Webster (January 13, 1959 – July 4, 2018) was an American journalist, author, film-maker, and humanitarian.

A former senior editor for Outside magazine, his work appeared in The New Yorker, National Geographic, Smithsonian, Vanity Fair, Men's Health, Garden & Gun, and The New York Times Magazine, among other publications. He was also an advisory board member of the National Geographic Society, the interim editor of the Virginia Quarterly Review, and a lecturer in the Department of Honors Media Studies at the University of Virginia. He lived outside Charlottesville, Virginia.

== Life ==
Born in Chicago, Illinois, Webster grew up in Chicago's North Shore community of Wilmette, Illinois. He graduated from New Trier High School and Kenyon College, finishing with a BA in English in 1981, and went on to attend Middlebury College's Breadloaf School of English for MFA graduate school.

He then moved to New York City, New York, where he wrote for several magazines, many with the Conde Nast Corporation, where he was soon employed. In 1986, working with friends, he co-founded Southern magazine, which was purchased by Time, Inc. in 1989. After that, he spent several years as senior editor at Outside magazine before going to write full-time.

In 1996, following a cover story he wrote in The New York Times Magazine about global land-mine proliferation, he co-founded Physicians Against Landmines/Center for International Rehabilitation (CIR). An international, non-governmental humanitarian organization, CIR sponsors field hospitals, wheelchair and prosthetics programs, plus prosthetics-fabrication training and disability advocacy in post-conflict nations worldwide. In 1997, as an early member of the International Campaign to Ban Landmines, CIR was a co-recipient of the Nobel Peace Prize. In 2006, working with the United Nations Special Rapporteur for Disabilities, CIR was central to the UN’s Convention on the Rights of Persons with Disabilities, the most-rapidly ratified UN Convention to ever gain approval by the UN General Assembly. Webster served as CIR's vice-chairman.

In 2005, he ground-reported and co-authored the United Nations report on destruction and disabilities created around the Indian Ocean basin by the 2004 Banda Aceh Tsunami.

In 2007, he was co-founder and became President of Tidene/USA: the U.S. arm of the non-governmental humanitarian organization Tidene (which he also co-founded in 2006). Originally a France-based project with offices developed in Washington DC, and Agadez, Niger, Tidene builds water wells for humans, livestock, and agricultural cultivation, as well as schools and hospitals for the Tuareg people of Niger, the poorest and driest country on earth. Since 2007, 252 wells, a school, and a dispensary hospital have been created across an area the size of Germany. Together, these facilities help the Sahara's nomadic people survive and prosper (the ultimate goal is 400 wells). Funding has come from the U.S. Congress — through the US African Development Foundation, an arm of the U.S. Congress and USAID — and from a devoted conglomerate of French philanthropists and wine producers. In 2014, Tidene/USA was absorbed into a larger organization, Les Puits du Desert/Tidene.

When asked in a newspaper interview about his beliefs on God, Webster responded: "I don't know. I don't know if there is a God. There's something. There's obviously a rhythm to the universe. But if there is a God, it has to be a man, because a female God wouldn't have screwed up the world this much."

He wrote "Traveling the Long Road to Freedom, One Step at a Time," which was published in Smithsonian magazine; this article was recently used in the English language and literature pre-release material (AQA).

In 2006 and 2007, he was co-leader of the expedition Running the Sahara, an on-foot crossing of North Africa from the Atlantic Ocean beach in Senegal to the beach at the Suez in Egypt. The expedition was filmed and edited into a documentary film, Running the Sahara, narrated by Matt Damon and released in 2007 with the logistics support of Sam Rutherford at prepare2go.com. The project began in Senegal and went through Mauritania, Mali, Niger and Libya, before culminating in Egypt. Runners included Charlie Engle, Ray Zahab and Kevin Lin.

In February 2009, he and his son, James Webster, became graduates of Gruppo Storico Romano, the Roman Coliseum's Gladiator School, as recognized gladiators with the organization's 11th Legion.

In July and August 2011, he and photographer Ron Haviv traveled to Madre de Dios Region in southeast Peru for the Amazon Aid Foundation. There they documented the environmental destruction of the upper-Amazon basin rainforest by illegal gold mining, a practice that has increased exponentially due to a recent leap in gold prices. A documentary film team followed their investigation. The result is Amazon Gold, a multi-award-winning theatrical documentary film narrated by Academy Award winners Sissy Spacek and Herbie Hancock.

== Criminal conviction ==
On August 14, 2014, Webster was charged with driving under the influence after he set into motion a fatal collision that, along with an 18-wheel truck, killed 75-year-old Wayne Thomas White Sr. on Afton Mountain's route 250 near Waynesboro, Virginia. In October, the commonwealth's attorney added a charge of involuntary manslaughter, and in December Webster was formally indicted.

On February 18, 2015, he pleaded guilty to involuntary manslaughter.

In the February/March 2018 edition of AARP Magazine he wrote that he began drinking and suffering from PTSD after reporting on the Southeast Asian Tsunami in 2004. He recounted how his personal and professional life had been ruined by the time he spent in prison saying, "As I slowly edge toward 60, with a broken family, virtually no money, nothing great in the way of work prospects and only my wits and a few friends who love me still around, I have a powerful remorse for the damage I have caused. But what I don't have — perhaps because I simply can't afford it — is self pity. [...] But I have realized that there’s some great power in being around long enough to comprehend that no matter the damage we’ve done, a new door will open."

== Death ==
On the Fourth of July, 2018, Donovan passed away.

== Bibliography ==
- Traveler's Tales: France, Traveler's Tales 1995 ISBN 1-885-21102-3
- From the Field: The Best of National Geographic Writing, National Geographic 1997 ISBN 978-0792270126
- Aftermath – The Remnants of War, Donovan Webster, Pantheon Books, New York, 1996 ISBN 0-679-43195-0
- The Burma Road: The Epic Story of the China-Burma-India Theater in World War II, Donovan Webster, Farrar Straus & Giroux, New York, NY, 2003 ISBN 0-06-074638-6
- Tears of Stone (foreword), by Jane Alden Stevens, University of Cincinnati, 2004, ISBN 0-9743338-1-6
- Babylon by Bus, Ray Lemoine & Jeff Neumann, (with Donovan Webster), Penguin Press, New York, NY, 2006 ISBN 1-59420-091-2
- Meeting the Family: One Man's Journey Through His Human Ancestry, Spencer Wells (Foreword), National Geographic/Random House, 2010 ISBN 978-1-4262-0573-6
- Ship of Death: A Voyage that Changed the Atlantic World, (with Billy Smith), Yale University Press, 2013 ISBN 978-0300194524
- The Southerner's Handbook, Harper/Wave, 2013 ISBN 978-0062242389
- Moonshine: Five Centuries of American History, Distilled Corn Whiskey, and Stickin‘ it to the Man, Amazon Kindle Singles (2014)
- Good Dog: True Stories of Love, Loss, and Loyalty, Harper/Wave, 2014 ISBN 978-0-06-224235-8
- Keller's Turn: a novel, Xlibris, 2014 ISBN 978-1-4990-8409-2
- War Stories: True-Life Fiction from the Global War on Terror, Xlibris, 2015, ISBN 978-1-5035-1212-2
- Journeys Home: Inspiring Stories, Plus Tips & Strategies to Find Your Family History, National Geographic Society, 2015 ISBN 978-1-4262-1381-6

== See also ==
- Aftermath: The Remnants of War
