= Guantanamo's Child =

- Directed by: Patrick Reed; Michelle Shephard (co-director)
- Written by: Michelle Shephard
- Produced by: Patrick Reed; Michelle Shephard; Peter Raymont
- Starring: Omar Khadr; Dennis Edney
- Cinematography: John Westheuser
- Edited by: Cathy Gulkin
- Music by: Mark Korven
- Production company: White Pine Pictures
- Distributed by: Al Jazeera English
- Release date: September 14, 2015 (TIFF)
- Running time: 80 minutes
- Country: Canada
- Language: English

Guantanamo's Child is a 2015 Canadian documentary film. Directed by Patrick Reed and Michelle Shephard, based on Shephard's 2009 book Guantanamo's Child: The Untold Story of Omar Khadr, the film profiles Omar Khadr, a Canadian citizen whose conviction on disputed war crimes charges and incarceration at the Guantanamo Bay detention camp have been prominent political issues in Canada.

== Synopsis ==
The documentary features the story of Omar Khadr, who was captured in 2002 by Americans in Afghanistan and was charged with war crimes. The film takes an in-depth look at how Khadr, at 15 years old, became the center of one of the first American war crimes trials since the 1940s through Khadr's perspective. For the first time, Omar Khadr was allowed to speak for himself on camera. Khadr pleaded guilty to five war crimes in October 2010 for a plea deal that gave him a chance to possibly return to Canada and an eight-year sentence. Omar Khadr spent a decade at Guantanamo,"Guantanamo’s Child: Omar Khadr features unprecedented access and exclusive interviews with Khadr during his first few days of freedom in Edmonton, where he was released on bail on May 7, 2015". The film is in part based on Michelle Shepard’s book Guantanamo's Child: The Untold Story of Omar Khadr; the documentary follows through the timeline between Khadr's childhood and his time at Guantanamo till his current life of freedom.

== Production ==
The film was produced by White Pine Pictures, in association with Al Jazeera and the Canadian Broadcasting Corporation. This documentary is an expanded version of a television program that aired on CBC in May 2015 called Omar Khadr: Out of the Shadows. A version of the film aired on Al Jazeera English in June 2015. It had its world premiere at the 2015 Toronto International Film Festival. At the 2015 Calgary International Film Festival, the film won the Audience Choice Award for Best Documentary Feature. In December, the film was announced as part of TIFF's annual Canada's Top Ten screening series of the so-called ten best Canadian feature films of the year.

== Reception ==
Guantanamo’s Child: Omar Khadr was nominated for an Emmy at the 37th Annual News & Documentary Emmy Awards. The film was nominated in the Outstanding Coverage of Current News Story—Long Form category, along with PBS Frontline projects, Secrets, Politics and Torture and Inside Assad’s Syria. The documentary also received the Donald Brittain Award and the award for Best Direction in a Documentary Program at the 5th Canadian Screen Awards.
