= Keith A. Petty =

Captain Keith A. Petty is an American lawyer and officer in the United States Army. He is notable for being appointed to serve as one of the prosecutors on the Guantanamo military commissions, and has taken his arguments to the press.

According to Michelle Shephard, of the Toronto Star, Petty has written and stated:

"I often wonder why defence counsel bother facing the military judge during oral argument. Most of their statements seem pre-packaged for a press release and more appropriately aimed at the gallery in the rear. This should surprise no one. The effective public relations campaign by the defense coupled with an overly receptive audience in the press and (non-governmental organizations) will likely prevail."

Petty wrote an article for the May 2008 Middle East Institute entitled: Carnival of Justice: Military Commissions & Guantanamo Bay, where he claimed the commissions process "...is by any legal standards quite fair." He wrote:

"But it seems that the commissions' proceedings are merely a sideshow in this carnival-like atmosphere."

== Education ==
Higher education
B.A.	Indiana University
J.D.	Case Western Reserve University
LL.M.	Georgetown University Law Center

== Legal career ==
The positions Petty has held in his legal career include:

- Trial Chambers of the International Criminal Tribunal for the Former Yugoslavia;
- Assistant Professor of the War Crimes Prosecution Lab, Case Western Reserve University, School of Law;
- Brigade Judge Advocate, Baghdad
- Prosecutor in the Office of Military Commissions.
