= Jo-Anne McArthur =

Canadian photojournalist (born 1976)

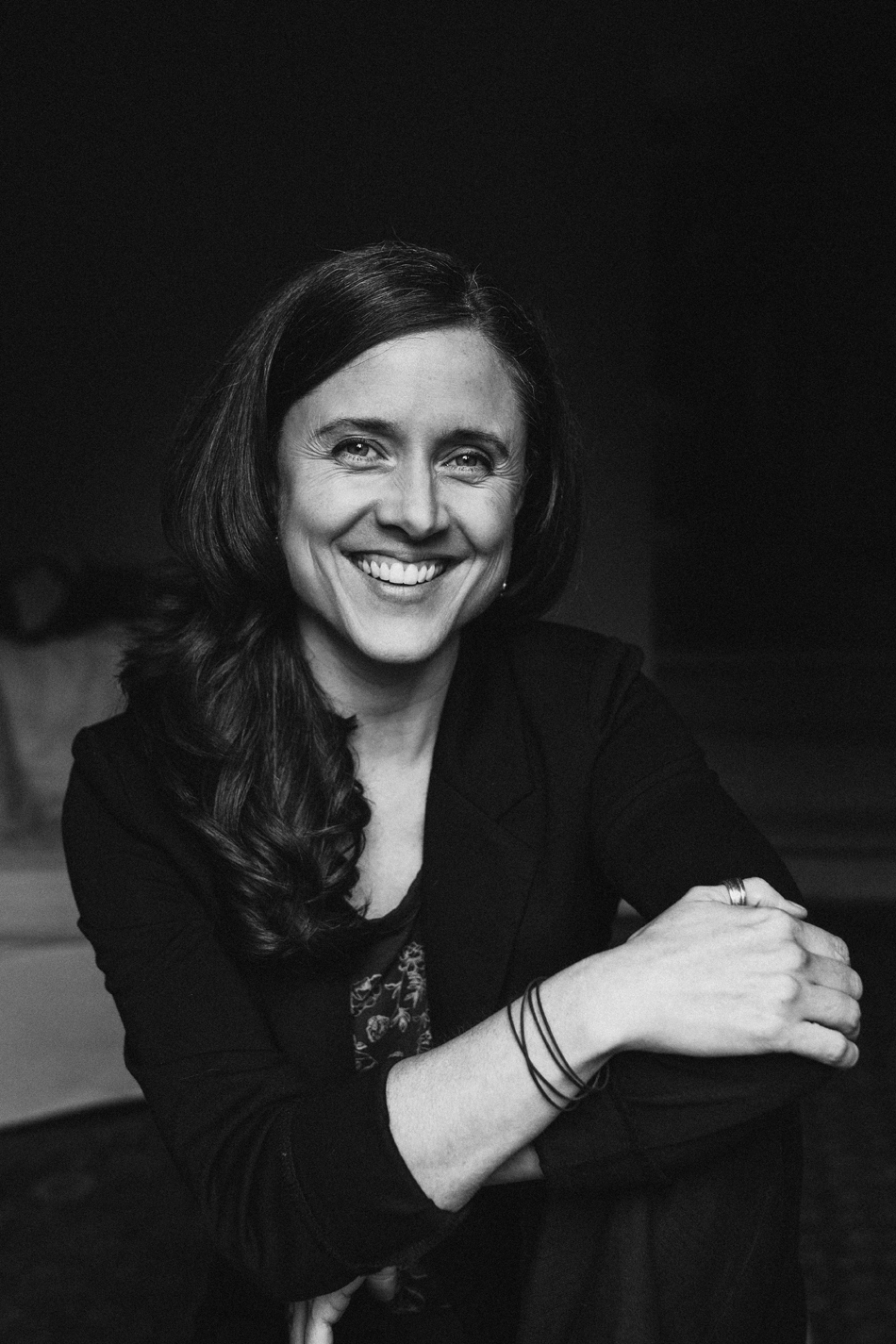
- Born: December 23, 1976 (age 49); Ottawa, Ontario, Canada
- Occupations: Photojournalist, animal advocate, author
- Website: joannemcarthur.com

Jo-Anne McArthur (born December 23, 1976) is a Canadian photojournalist, humane educator, animal rights activist and author. She is known for her We Animals project, a photography project documenting human relationships with animals. McArthur presents about human relationships with animals in educational and other environments and provides photographs and other media for those working to help animals.

McArthur was the primary subject of the 2013 documentary The Ghosts in Our Machine, directed by Liz Marshall, and with Keri Cronin, she is the founder of the Unbound Project, which recognizes female animal activists. Her first book, We Animals, was published in 2013; her second, Captive, was published in 2017; and a third, Hidden: Animals in the Anthropocene, co-authored with journalist Keith Wilson, was published in 2020. McArthur has been awarded several commendations in the Wildlife Photographer of the Year awards and joint first place in the COP26 photography competition.

== Early life and education ==
McArthur was raised in Ottawa, Ontario, and studied geography and English at the University of Ottawa. She decided to pursue photography after taking an elective course on black-and-white photography at university.

== Career ==
McArthur originally entered photography motivated by artistry, but she instead came to see her camera as her "tool for creating change". Her earlier work photographing animals was in the genre of street photography, but she increasingly photographs captive animals, sometimes while undercover. In 2010, the trauma of her work led to her being diagnosed with post-traumatic stress disorder, though she has since recovered. Her photographs are sometimes published anonymously.

Her work has been published in the newspaper The Guardian, the magazines National Geographic and Vice, and the news website National Observer. In addition, her photographs have been used by over 100 animal advocacy organizations and in academic work on human-animal relationships.

McArthur appeared in the top 50 of the Canadian Broadcasting Corporation Champions of Change contest, and on More's fourth annual "Fierce" list. She has also been awarded the Institute for Critical Animal Studies's 2014 Media Award, and the Toronto Vegetarian Association's 2013 Lisa Grill Compassion for Animals Award (with Liz Marshall). Farm Sanctuary awarded her the 2013 "Friend of Farm Animals" award, and listed her as one of their "Heroes of Compassion" in 2016.

In 2018, McArthur was awarded the Wildlife Photographer of the Year People's Choice award for a photograph of Pikin, a lowland gorilla rescued from poachers by Ape Action Africa, in the arms of Appolinaire Ndohoudou, a carer, while Pikin was being transported between two sanctuaries in Cameroon. The photograph was selected by voters from a shortlist of 24 chosen by the Natural History Museum. McArthur said that she was "so thankful that this image resonated with people", hoping that it might "inspire us all to care a little bit more about animals ... No act of compassion towards them is ever too small." She went on to win the Special Award of the Jury for the best single picture entry as a part of The Alfred Fried Photography Award 2018 for the same photograph. The jury were unanimous in their decision, and described the photograph by saying:

Jo-Anne McArthur firmly believes that animals are individuals and have feelings. And if proof were needed she supplied it with this magnificent picture full of tenderness. A moment when it transpires that animals too know a feeling of safety and comfort, are able and willing to trust and need affection. And that they recognize when it is offered to them.

In the 2019 Wildlife Photographer of the Year competition, McArthur's photo "The Wall of Shame" was "highly commended" in the photojournalism category. The photo features the skins of rattlesnakes surrounded by the bloody handprints of people who had skinned a snake at a rattlesnake round-up in Sweetwater, Texas.

In 2020, her photograph "Hope in a Burned Forest" (or "Hope in Burned Plantation"), featuring a kangaroo surrounded by burned woodland, was named the winner in the Wildlife Photographer of the Year "man and nature" category. It is a photograph of an eastern grey kangaroo and her calf in a burned eucalyptus forest near Mallacoota, Victoria, in an area damaged during the 2019–20 Australian bushfire season. The same photograph was a winner of the Grand Prize in the 2021 BigPicture Natural World Photography Competition, and was "highly commended" in the Wildlife Photographer of the Year People's Choice Award.

McArthur jointly won the COP26 photography competition for a photograph of a sow and piglet on an industrial pork farm in Italy. The other winner was Doug Gimesy. Her "Hope in a Burned Forest" and a photograph of a cow being transported across a border were also finalists. McArthur's photograph of Ron, a chimp formerly used for invasive research, was the winner of the "Man and Nature" category in the 2021's Asociación Española de Fotógrafos de Naturaleza (AEFONA) "Photography for Conservation" Contest.

McArthur was a judge for the 2021 World Press Photo contest in the "Nature" category.

=== We Animals ===
McArthur conceived of the We Animals project in around 1998 after an encounter with a monkey chained to a windowsill in Ecuador. She photographed the monkey and said she "knew that the way [she] saw our treatment of animals was important, and [she] wanted to share that point of view".

In December 2013, We Animals, a photobook by McArthur containing both text and over 100 of her photographs, was published by Lantern Books. Activist Bruce Friedrich, in a review published by The Huffington Post, described it as "the most gorgeous book [he had] experienced in many years", one which "offers haunting sadness, [but also] intense hope". In The Guardian in 2020, Ziya Tong selected the book as one of the best to widen readers' world views, writing that "McArthur brings an empathetic lens to the grim reality – mostly unchallenged – of millions of lives spent in captivity".

McArthur has spoken in educational institutions since 2008. In 2014, a grant was awarded to McArthur to develop the We Animals Humane Education project by The Pollination Project and the Thinking Vegan. McArthur offers presentations in school, university and other environments. The program seeks to "foster awe, curiosity and critical thinking about our relationships with animals", to "instill reverence, respect and responsibility", inspire empathy with animals, to "create gentler stewards of the earth", and to encourage people to be "agents of positive change". In 2017, McArthur launched the We Animals Archive, an archive of photographs and videos of animals in human-dominated environments. The Archive serves as a repository of media from the wider We Animals project that can be freely used by individuals and organizations working towards animal-protection goals. The Archive was subsequently replaced by We Animals Media.

==== We Animals Media ====
In 2019, We Animals Media (WAM) – a media agency focused on stories of animal exploitation – was launched. McArthur is the founder and director. Projects of We Animals Media include the We Animals Media Photography Masterclass with McArthur. It is financially supported by private donors and grants from, among others, the Open Philanthropy Project.

WAM was described in The Walrus as "possibly the largest archive of such images in the world". McArthur takes pictures for WAM, and many of its images were originally captured by her, but WAM has a wide range of contributors. McArthur says that "Hopefully, eventually, there'll be no more need for the archive ... It'll literally be an archive, a historical, closed archive of what was and should never again be. Hopefully, in my lifetime."

== Books ==
McArthur published a second book through Lantern, entitled Captive, in 2017. The book, which features contributions from activist Virginia McKenna and philosopher Lori Gruen, focuses on animals in zoos and aquaria. It also contains a series of short essays by McArthur. Stephen F. Eisenman reviewed the book for Animal Liberation Currents, comparing McArthur's photography with that of other zoo photographers and photographers of human prisons. He said that

McArthur's Captive is a powerful, visual survey of zoo animals and their physical conditions of captivity. But precisely because it examines so many different zoos and animals, its cannot provide significant insight either into the subjectivity of captive animals, or the ideological and economic function of zoological gardens. The merging of close and sustained photographic observation and detailed institutional history and critique is what is most lacking in the current generation of zoo books. That's a worthwhile project for McArthur and her peers in the future.

Photographs from the book appeared in the We Animals Archive in a section called A Year in Captivity. They were also exhibited at Toronto's Harbourfront Centre in September 2017.

McArthur's third book, Hidden: Animals in the Anthropocene, co-authored with the journalist Keith Wilson, is about "our conflict with non-human animals around the globe, as depicted through the lenses of thirty award-winning photojournalists", with a foreword written by Joaquin Phoenix. It was released in 2020. Writing in The Guardian, Olivia Wilson described the book as shedding "light on industrial scale factory farms and slaughterhouses ... [revealing] in often bloody detail how little we know about what goes on within these windowless walls".]

McArthur was inspired by James Nachtwey's photobook Inferno, which featured photographs of "what we do to each other", and "moved [her] to the core". She "knew animals needed a book like this. With the growing number of photographers who are turning their lenses to an invisible war, one that few people see, the war on animals, I knew we could create something historic, an indictment."

Hidden: Animals in the Anthropocene jointly won the 2021 Independent Publisher Book Award for book "Most Likely to Save the Planet" with Carrie Packwood Freeman's The Human Animal Earthling Identity, published by University of Georgia Press. It won the "Photography Book of the Year" award at the 78th Pictures of the Year awards. The book's photographs were displayed at London's Natural History Museum, Berlin's F³ – Freiraum für Fotografie, and Perpignan's Visa pour l'Image.

=== Unbound Project ===
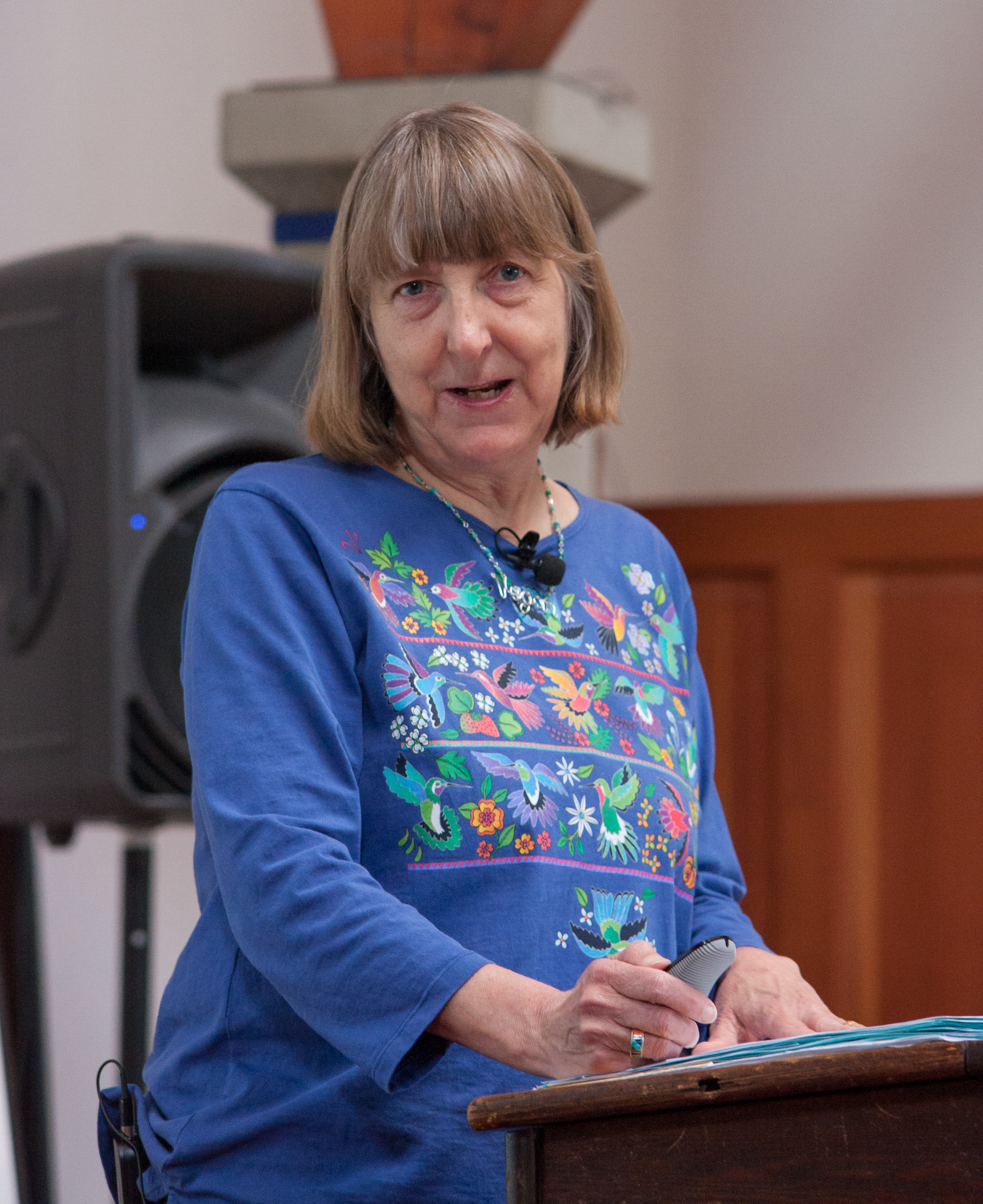
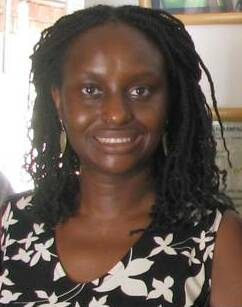
Carol J. Adams and Gladys Kalema-Zikusoka, two of the women profiled for the Unbound Project

With Keri Cronin, an associate professor of art history at the Department of Visual Arts at Brock University, McArthur founded the Unbound Project, a multimedia and book project aiming to recognize women at the forefront of animal advocacy. Contemporary women profiled include Anita Krajnc, Carol J. Adams, Hilda Kean, Wendy Valentine, Leah Garcés, Seba Johnson, Lek Chailert, Gladys Kalema-Zikusoka, Marianne Thieme, and Elisa Aaltola. Historical women profiled include Lizzy Lind af Hageby, Ruth Harrison, Elizabeth Stuart Phelps, Dorothy Brooke, Caroline Earle White, Louisa May Alcott, Anna Laetitia Barbauld, and Fanny Martin.

=== Documentary ===
McArthur was the "main human subject" of the 2013 documentary film The Ghosts in Our Machine, directed by Liz Marshall. The film avoids the shocking imagery of many documentaries focused on animal rights, such as Earthlings, meaning that it "takes an almost arthouse approach, resulting in a film that's more a meditation on suffering and the relationship between humans and other species, than an angry, didactic diatribe". Writing in Variety, critic Peter Debruge said that

It's enough to make you sad, not for the animals (to whom human cruelty is nothing new), but for McArthur, this beautiful young woman who feels so deeply for those not of her kind that she carries their collective suffering around with her daily. What must it be like to experience PTSD after visiting dairy farms and facilities that supply primates for medical testing?

== See also ==
- List of animal rights advocates
