= Iris Ng =

Canadian cinematographer

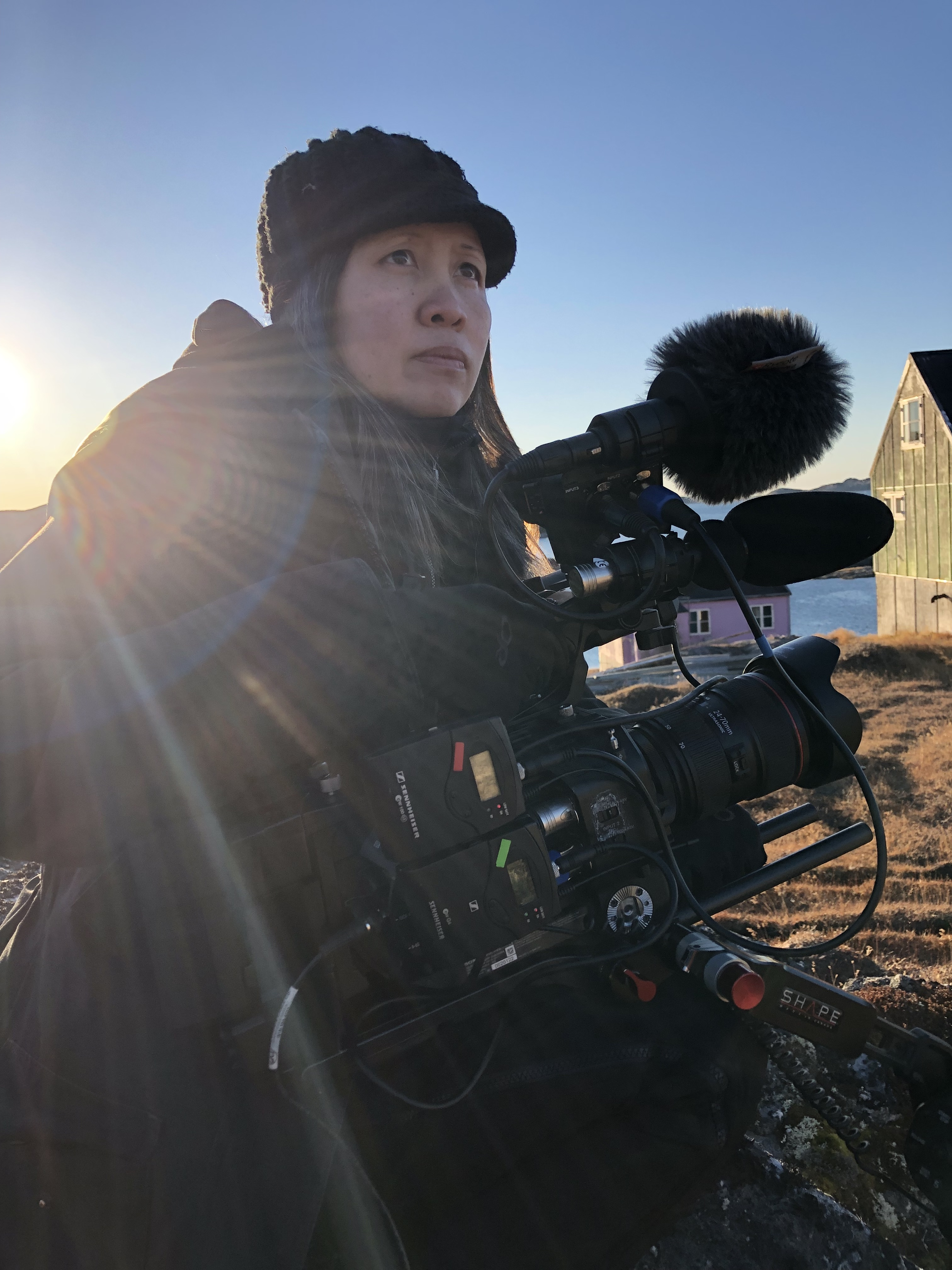

Iris Ng is a Canadian cinematographer, most noted for her work on documentary films.

She worked on short films in her early career before working with Min Sook Lee on My Toxic Baby as her first full-length project. She then became more widely known for her work on Sarah Polley's acclaimed film Stories We Tell, which established her reputation as a cinematographer whose work combined the ability to "blend into a situation but also remain present as a human who can be supportive".

Working alongside director Lin Alluna and human rights activist Aaju Peter on their film Twice Colonized, Ng says: "Lin had a very decisive vision for the film’s reliance on verité filming and the incorporation of Super 8 to metaphorically illustrate scenes from Aaju’s past. I have a portfolio with both of these attributes, which allowed us to connect and develop a common vision for the film. Further to that, I am very interested in directing my creative energy toward projects that highlight critical and underrepresented stories. This film's challenging subject matter with its experimental elements felt especially enticing as well."

In 2024, she was announced as the subject of a special program highlighting her work at the Hot Docs Canadian International Documentary Festival.

== Filmography ==
=== Film ===
- Circa 1960 - 2006
- Sixty Days - 2007
- Point of Departure - 2008
- Bunko - 2008
- Purfled Promises - 2009
- My Toxic Baby - 2009
- Resilience: Stories of Single Black Mothers - 2010
- The Market - 2011
- Stories We Tell - 2012
- Service of the Goods - 2013
- Muneeza in the Middle - 2014
- The Innocents - 2014
- Michael M. Koerner - 2015
- Diana Leblanc - 2015
- The Trick with the Gun - 2015
- League of Exotique Dancers - 2015
- The Trip - 2015
- Dancer of the Board - 2016
- Migrant Dreams - 2016
- This River - 2016
- The Apology - 2016
- Isla Santa Maria 3D - 2016
- Nuuca - 2017
- A Better Man - 2017
- ROPEd - 2017
- Come to Me, Paradise - 2017
- The Country - 2018
- The Woman Who Loves Giraffes - 2018
- The Terrorist Hunter - 2018
- The Way Out - 2018
- Shirkers - 2018
- Toxic Beauty - 2019
- Push - 2019
- Communicating Vessels - 2020
- My So-Called Selfish Life - 2021
- One of Ours - 2021
- Artificial Immortality - 2021
- Subjects of Desire - 2021
- Distant Cousins - 2022
- Category: Woman - 2022
- Twice Colonized - 2023
- Money Shot: The Pornhub Story - 2023
- There Are No Words - 2025

=== Television ===
- Committed - 2010
- Herman's House - 2012
- The Ghosts in Our Machine - 2013
- Organic Panic - 2014
- Making a Murderer - 2015-18
- American Masters: "Loretta Lynn: Still a Mountain Girl" - 2016
- Girls' Night Out - 2016
- Robin & Mark & Richard III - 2016
- Once an Immigrant - 2017
- Neanderthals: Meet Your Ancestors - 2018
- In the Making - 2019
- Running Wild: The Cats of Cornwall - 2020
- Hey Lady! - 2020
- Strays - 2021
- Nature: "Flyways" - 2024

== Awards ==
| Award | Date of ceremony | Category | Work | Result | Ref(s) |
|---|---|---|---|---|---|
| Canadian Screen Awards | 2015 | Photography in a Documentary Program or Factual Series | The Ghosts in Our Machine with Nicholas de Pencier, Liz Marshall, John Price | Nominated | |
| Canadian Screen Awards | 2023 | Photography in a Comedy Series | Strays ("House Sitting") | Nominated | |
| Canadian Screen Awards | 2023 | Photography in a Documentary Program or Factual Series | Artificial Immortality with Stephen Chung | Nominated | |
| Canadian Screen Awards | 2026 | Best Cinematography in a Documentary | There Are No Words | Won | |
