= Patrick Reed (director) =

Canadian documentary filmmaker

Patrick Reed is a Canadian documentary filmmaker. He is most noted as co-director with Michelle Shephard of the 2015 documentary film Guantanamo's Child, for which they won the Donald Brittain Award, and the award for Best Direction in a Documentary Program, at the 5th Canadian Screen Awards in 2016. The film was also the winner of the Directors Guild of Canada's Allan King Award for Best Documentary Film.

His film The Team was previously nominated in both of the same CSA categories at the 1st Canadian Screen Awards in 2013, and his 2008 film Triage: Dr. James Orbinski's Humanitarian Dilemma was previously shortlisted for the Allan King Award.

His other films have included Fight Like Soldiers Die Like Children (2012) and PTSD: Beyond Trauma (2017).
