= The Ghosts in Our Machine =

2013 Canadian documentary film

- Directed by: Liz Marshall
- Written by: Liz Marshall
- Produced by: Nina Beveridge; Liz Marshall
- Starring: Jo-Anne McArthur
- Cinematography: John Price; Iris Ng; Nicholas de Pencier; Liz Marshall
- Edited by: Roland Schlimme; Roderick Deogrades
- Music by: Bob Wiseman
- Production company: Ghosts Media Inc.
- Distributed by: Indiecan Entertainment; Films Transit; BullFrog Films; LizMars Productions; Syndicado; Virgil Films
- Release date: April 28, 2013 (Hot Docs)
- Running time: 92 minutes
- Country: Canada
- Language: English

The Ghosts in Our Machine is a 2013 Canadian documentary film by Liz Marshall. The film follows the photojournalist and animal rights activist Jo-Anne McArthur as she photographs animals on fur farms and at Farm Sanctuary, among other places, and seeks to publish her work. The film as a whole is a plea for animal rights.

The film premiered at the 2013 Hot Docs International Film Festival.

== Synopsis ==
The Ghosts in Our Machine follows photojournalist and animal activist Jo-Anne McArthur. The documentary opens with images of animals and sound bites on animal rights, before McArthur introduces herself. She describes herself as a war photographer and activist, more concerned with changing the world than with art. She meets with representatives of Redux Pictures—though they are supportive, they express doubts about her work being published—and then has dinner with a group, one of whom, Martin Rowe, offers to be an editor for her photobook.

McArthur travels with an activist to a fur farm. The activist, "Marcus", explains that publishing photographs is more damaging to the fur industry than property damage, and talks about the kind of harms which can come to animals on the farms. The pair enter the facility surreptitiously, keen to leave no traces, in order to photograph the animals on the farm. McArthur looks through her photographs once they have left, focusing on photographs of injured foxes in wire cages. The pair travel to a larger facility housing mink, near which they find breeding cards linking the facility to a company from the Netherlands. They enter this farm to take photographs.

McArthur next visits Farm Sanctuary, where she and Susie Coston, the organization's director, discuss the importance of a personal connection with individual animals. The pair then travel to pick up a "spent" dairy cow and a "down" calf, later named Fanny and Sonny respectively. They take the cows to Cornell University Hospital for Animals where they receive health checks and treatment. Back at Farm Sanctuary, McArthur and Coston discuss the running of the institution before introducing Fanny and Sonny to their new homes. McArthur visits Farm Sanctuary some time later to again to photograph and write about the animals, including Fanny and Sonny.

Undercover footage of beagles used in animal testing introduces Maggie, a purpose-bred beagle for teaching who was adopted by Melanie and Mark. McArthur follows Melanie and Mark as they adopt Abbey, a second beagle, and talk about the difficulties Maggie experienced when it came to adapting to her new life. McArthur compiles photographs for her book alongside footage of marine mammal parks and the voice of Lori Marino, who criticizes the institutions. McArthur talks about the late Ron, a chimpanzee to whom she is dedicating her book. Ron was used in research and kept in a small cage. She describes him as an "ambassador for animals used in research". McArthur next joins Toronto Pig Save activists, protesting the slaughter of pigs and interacting with pigs headed for slaughter. She returns to Farm Sanctuary, which has received a sow abused on a breeding farm and her piglets. McArthur then visits Redux Pictures again, where she shows her pictures to Newsweek's James Welford and explains the realities of human-animal relationships.

After images of meat, the voice of abattoir-designer Temple Grandin is heard, over footage of cattle slaughter. McArthur visits Farm Sanctuary once again. Among others, she sees Fanny, who will have hoof and bone problems for life, and Sonny, now a year old. McArthur visits a high school, where she answers questions from students. The documentary, dedicated "for the ghosts", finishes with footage of animals and the voices of Vandana Shiva, Bruce Friedrich, Antoine F. Goetschel and Gieri Bolliger, all calling for animal rights.

== Development and production ==
Filmmaker Liz Marshall was prompted to create The Ghosts in Our Machine "to give a voice to the non-human world". Her previous films, including Water on the Table, about the right to water and the struggle to protect it from the free market, had been "human-centric", focused on human rights and environmental themes, and she intended to also "turn [her] gaze and commitment to the plight of animals used for human profit: the billions of ghosts used in the machine of our modern world". She was inspired to focus on the suffering of animals by Lorena Elke, her partner, a vegan and animal activist; a second influence was Marshall's dog, Troy Celina Marshall, who died in 2011. Liz Marshall had been planning, with Elke, to produce a film on animal rights for several years, but the idea of the film's particular approach did not come to Marshall until she learned of Jo-Anne McArthur's We Animals photography project —Jo-Anne was a friend of Marshall and Elke. Speaking about McArthur's presence in the film, Marshall said that "it became increasingly clear that I needed a central human narrative to help anchor the animal stories, and Jo was that natural fit for me". Nonetheless, she did not see the film as a biopic, saying that it "is not a biography of Jo, but it will be an up close and personal journey with her as she does what she does, around the world, over the course of many months".

Mirroring McArthur's photographic approach, Marshall intended to make the film about "individual animals used for human profit and consumption". Online, the project would tell the "ghost stories" of individual animals, and the film would tell the stories of individual animals within the four main animal industries. Marshall started to spend a large amount of time on the documentary project in Autumn 2010, with plans to follow and film McArthur in North America and Europe, with filming to begin in Summer 2011. The first story filmed in that Summer was that of the rescue of Sonny and Fanny by Farm Sanctuary.

Long before the release of the film, Marshall began a cross-media campaign, allowing the documentary to "unfold over time in stages". The initial online launch date, including a trailer, website and social media presence, was April 2011. This online presence partially served to create a viewership base prior to the film's release, with Marshall hoping to attract a broad spectrum of animal advocates. Though she said that going "mainstream" would typically not be her aim, she said that "with this subject matter, it is the aim — this issue needs to be on the public radar".

Marshall explained that The Ghosts in Our Machine is "a film, a documentary website, a Vimeo channel, an active community-building Facebook page [and so on.] Its sole purpose is to be part of the movement to expand consciousness to help end the suffering of so many animals." An Indiegogo campaign was launched to help fund the project in reaching the next stage of its development, but this next stage was not solely the film. In an interview, Marshall called The Ghosts in Our Machine "a documentary film and an online immersive narrative experience". In the same interview, she explained that The Goggles—designers Paul Shoebridge and Michael Simons, creators of the interactive documentary Welcome to Pine Point and of Adbusters magazine—had joined the team, and, should funding permit it, would conceive of an online interactive companion to the film. The pair became the project's interactive directors, creating the film's interactive story. The magazine-format website www.ghostsinourmachine.com was launched on June 5, 2012; in 2013, the flash "immersive story" following McArthur's We Animals book writing process, by The Goggles, and produced by Ghosts Media was added to the website.

== Critical response ==
Reviewing the film for The Daily Telegraph, Rebecca Hawkes suggested that Marshall had eschewed the shocking imagery of many documentary films focused on animal rights, such as Earthlings, and instead "takes an almost arthouse approach, resulting in a film that's more a meditation on suffering and the relationship between humans and other species, than an angry, didactic diatribe". Using the example of the segments of fur farms, Hawkes suggested that focusing on living animals was "ultimately more powerful than a dozen shots of bloody pelts and butchered corpses". A similar sentiment was expressed in the Los Angeles Times, in which the critic Betsy Sharkey contrasted The Ghosts in Our Machine to the work of Michael Moore. The former, she suggested, as "a heartfelt meditation on animal rights, comes at you as a whisper". Despite this, Sharkey acknowledged that there were "some difficult images in the film", and Peter Debruge, in a critical review in Variety, described the film as "incredibly difficult-to-watch".

For Sharkey, the animal rights message is combined with a story about activism; "both narrative threads are compelling", she suggested, in this "finely wrought" documentary. Though David DeWitt, writing for The New York Times, suggested that he could not "imagine anyone not feeling moved during" Ghosts in Our Machine, he worried that McArthur may appear "extreme" to some viewers. Similarly, John DeFore of The Hollywood Reporter argued that "The moodily subjective work is best suited to viewers who already share most if not all of subject Jo-Anne McArthur's values; despite its obvious aesthetic appeal, its commercial value seems limited to niche bookings and special-event screenings for the activist community."

== Awards and nominations ==
Year	Award	Category	Nominee	Result
2015	3rd Canadian Screen Awards	Donald Brittain Award for Best Social/Political Documentary	The Ghosts in Our Machine	Nominated
2015	3rd Canadian Screen Awards	Best Direction in a Documentary Program	Liz Marshall	Nominated
2015	3rd Canadian Screen Awards	Best Photography in a Documentary Program or Factual Series	Nicholas de Pencier, Liz Marshall, Iris Ng and John Price	Nominated
2015	3rd Canadian Screen Awards	Best Sound in a Documentary, Factual or Lifestyle Program or Series	Garrett Kerr, Jason Milligan and Daniel Pellerin	Nominated
2014	2014 Webby Awards	Best Use of Interactive Video	The Ghosts in Our Machine Interactive	Honoree
2013	The 2013 Lush Prize	Public Awareness Prize	The Ghosts in Our Machine	Shortlisted
2013	Hot Docs Canadian International Documentary Festival	Audience Favourite	The Ghosts in Our Machine	Top 10
2013	Yorkton Film Festival Golden Sheaf Awards	Documentary Nature/Environment	The Ghosts in Our Machine	Won
2013	Yorkton Film Festival Golden Sheaf Awards	Best Director Non-Fiction	Liz Marshall	Nominated
2013	Toronto Vegetarian Association	Lisa Grill Compassion for Animals Award	Jo-Anne McArthur and Liz Marshall	Won
2013	DMZ International Documentary Film Festival	International Competition; Special Jury Prize	The Ghosts in Our Machine	Won
2013	Planet in Focus	Best Canadian Feature	The Ghosts in Our Machine	Won
2013	Planet in Focus	Green Screen Award	The Ghosts in Our Machine	Runner-up
2013	International Documentary Film Festival Amsterdam	Audience Favourite Award	The Ghosts in Our Machine	Top 20
2013	Aware Guide	Top Transformational Film	The Ghosts in Our Machine	Won
