= Hogtown: The Politics of Policing =

2005 Canadian documentary film

- Directed by: Min Sook Lee
- Written by: Min Sook Lee
- Produced by: Min Sook Lee; Sarah Zammit
- Cinematography: Peter Walker
- Edited by: Nick Hector
- Music by: Mark Korven
- Production company: City State Productions
- Release date: April 15, 2005 (Hot Docs)
- Running time: 96 minutes
- Country: Canada
- Language: English

Hogtown: The Politics of Policing is a Canadian documentary film, directed by Min Sook Lee and released in 2005. The film centres on the political pressures that were impacting the Toronto Police Services Board in 2004 under the new mayoral administration of David Miller, including budget cuts and the decision not to renew the contract of chief Julian Fantino.

The film premiered at the 2005 Hot Docs Canadian International Documentary Festival, where it was the winner of the award for Best Canadian Feature Documentary.
