= Stories We Tell =

2012 film by Sarah Polley

- Theatrical release poster
- Directed by: Sarah Polley
- Written by: Sarah Polley
- Produced by: Anita Lee; Silva Basmajian
- Starring: Rebecca Jenkins
- Cinematography: Iris Ng
- Edited by: Mike Munn
- Music by: Jonathan Goldsmith
- Production company: National Film Board of Canada
- Distributed by: Mongrel Media
- Release dates: August 29, 2012 (Venice); October 12, 2012 (Canada)
- Running time: 109 minutes
- Country: Canada
- Language: English
- Box office: $1.3 million

Stories We Tell is a 2012 Canadian documentary film written and directed by Sarah Polley and produced by the National Film Board of Canada (NFB). The film explores her family's secrets—including one intimately related to Polley's own identity. Stories We Tell premiered August 29, 2012 at the 69th Venice International Film Festival, then played at the 39th Telluride Film Festival and the 37th Toronto International Film Festival. In 2015, it was added to the Toronto International Film Festival's list of the top 10 Canadian films of all time, at number 10. It was also named the 70th greatest film since 2000 in a 2016 critics' poll by BBC.

== Plot ==
The film looks at the relationship between Polley's parents, Michael and Diane Polley, including the revelation that the filmmaker was the product of an extramarital affair between her mother and Montreal producer Harry Gulkin. It incorporates interviews with Polley's siblings from her mother's two marriages, interviews with other relatives and family friends, Michael Polley's narration of his memoir, and Super-8 footage shot to look like home movies of historical events in her family's life. The faux home video footage appears exceptionally authentic due to the cast of characters. The cast in the Super-8 re-creations includes Rebecca Jenkins as Diane, who had died of cancer on January 10, 1990, the week of Polley's 11th birthday. Polley began work five years before completing the documentary, taking many breaks in between.

== Response ==
In his August 29 Maclean's blog post, Johnson, one of the film critics who had kept Polley's secret, wrote:

Now that I've seen her documentary, which premieres in Venice next Wednesday, I'm glad I didn't spill the beans. It's a brilliant film: an enthralling, exquisitely layered masterpiece of memoir that unravels an extraordinary world of family secrets through a maze of interviews, home movies, and faux home movies cast with actors.

Writing for RogerEbert.com, film critic Sheila O'Malley gave the film four out of four stars, calling it "[a] powerful and thoughtful film...[that] is also not what it at first seems, which is part of the point Polley appears to be interested in making."

Rotten Tomatoes gives the film an approval rating of 94% based on 147 reviews, with an average rating of 8.6/10. The website's critical consensus states "In Stories We Tell, Sarah Polley plays with the documentary format to explore the nature of memory and storytelling, crafting a thoughtful, compelling narrative that unfolds like a mystery."

In her blog post on the NFB.ca website, Polley reveals that several journalists, including Brian D. Johnson and Matthew Hays, had known about the story of her biological father for years, but respected Polley's wish to keep the matter private until she was ready to tell her story in her own words.

=== Awards ===
On October 20, Stories We Tell received the Grand Prix Focus for best feature film in the Festival du nouveau cinéma's Focus category. In December, the film was included in the Toronto International Film Festival's list of "Canada's Top Ten" feature films of 2012. In 2015, it was added to the festival's list of the top 10 Canadian films of all time at number 10.

On January 8, 2013, Stories We Tell received the $100,000 prize for best Canadian film at the Toronto Film Critics Association Awards, after having been named best documentary by the association the previous month. On March 3, 2013, it was named best feature-length documentary at the 1st Canadian Screen Awards. In October 2013, Stories We Tell received the Allan King Award for Excellence in Documentary at the Directors Guild of Canada Awards in Toronto. In December 2013, the film received the New York Film Critics Circle Award for Best Non-Fiction Film, the National Board of Review Award for Best Documentary Film, and the Los Angeles Film Critics Association Award for Best Documentary Film. On February 1, 2014, the film received the Writers Guild of America Award for Best Documentary Screenplay.

Stories We Tell was nominated for a 2013 Cinema Eye Honors award and a 2013 International Documentary Association award. It was among the 15 films shortlisted for the 2013 Academy Award for Best Documentary Feature.

== Theatrical release ==
Stories We Tell was released theatrically in Canada starting October 12, 2012. The film had a limited release in the U.S. beginning May 17, 2013.

== See also ==
- My Mom Jayne (2025)
