= Stan Barua =

Polish Kenyan cinematographer (born 1965)

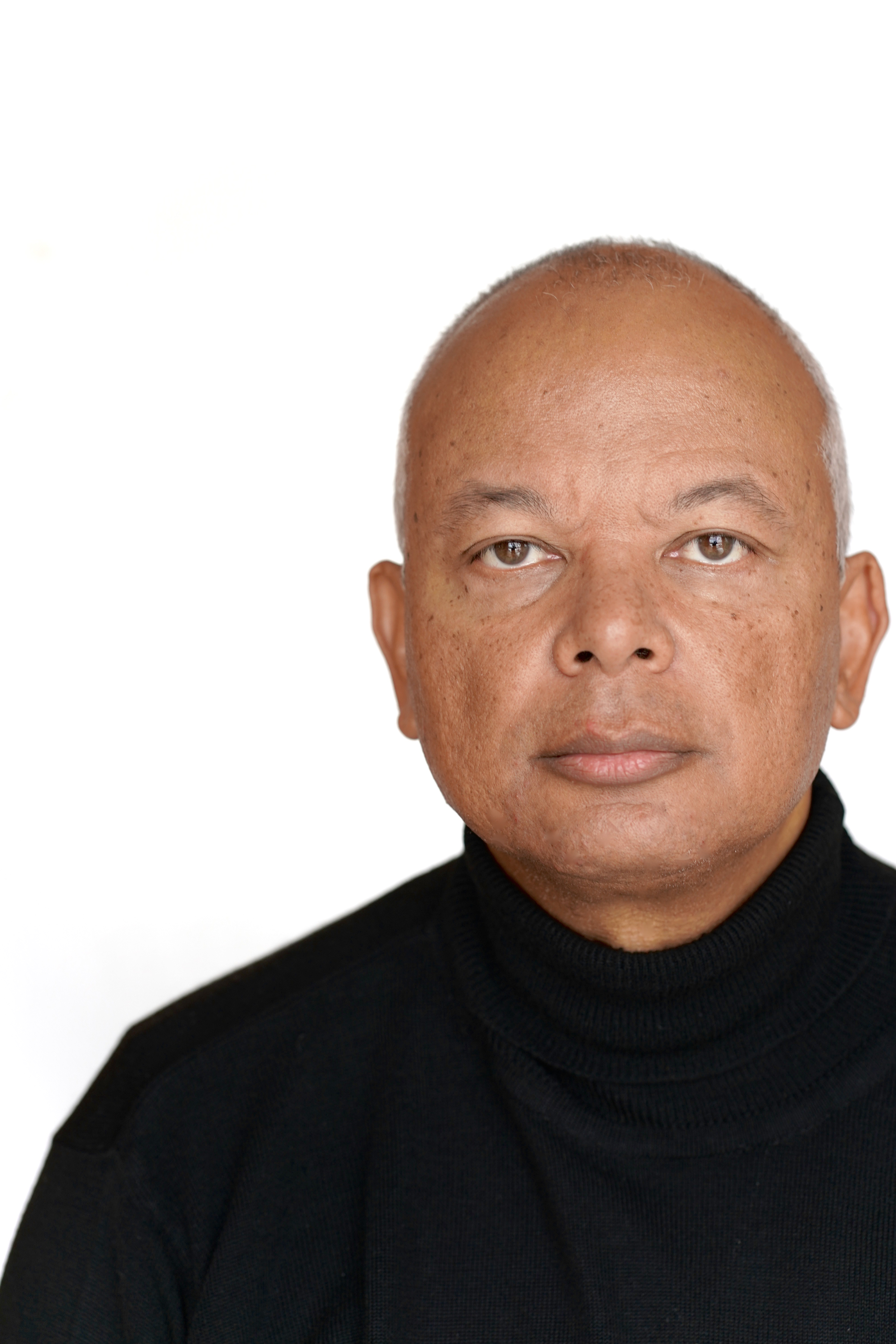

Stanisław Barua (born 22 September 1965, in Strzelce Opolskie) is a Polish Kenyan cinematographer, best known for his work on the lyrical Rain Best Atlantic Canada Short Film (2000), Journey to Justice nominee Best History Documentary Program (2000), Baba's House Best Canadian Short Drama and nominated Best Short Drama 2002, Tiger Spirit Best Social or Political Documentary (2008), the crime series Forensic Factor twice nominated Best General/Human Interest Series (2006 and 2008), The Invisible Heart (2020) nominated for Best Social/Political Documentary Program, and Seau de Sang (2021). A Master of Arts in Cinematography (distinction) degree graduate of the Łódź Film School, he won the Golden Sheaf Awards for Best Cinematography at the Yorkton Film Festival (2002) and an Eastman Kodak Cinematography Award at the WorldFest-Houston International Film Festival (2002). He was also a Best Photography in a Dramatic Program or Series nominee in 2002, was nominated for Best Photography in a Comedy, Variety, Performing Arts Program or Series in 2007, and for a Canadian Screen Award for Best Photography in a Documentary Program or Series in 2014. He was CSC Winner Canadian Society of Cinematographers Best Cinematography in Docu-drama Award (2015). |https://csc.ca/2023-awards/
