= Migrant Dreams =

2016 Canadian documentary film

- Directed by: Min Sook Lee
- Written by: Min Sook Lee
- Produced by: Min Sook Lee; Lisa Valencia-Svensson
- Cinematography: Iris Ng
- Edited by: Dave Kazala
- Music by: Ken Myhr
- Production company: Tiger Spirit Productions
- Release date: May 1, 2016 (Hot Docs)
- Running time: 88 minutes
- Country: Canada
- Language: English

Migrant Dreams is a Canadian documentary film, directed by Min Sook Lee and released in 2016. The film profiles human rights violations against migrant workers from Indonesia who were working as farm labourers in Southwestern Ontario under the Temporary Foreign Worker Program.

It was Lee's second documentary film about migrant workers in Canada, following 2003's El Contrato.

The film premiered at the 2016 Hot Docs Canadian International Documentary Festival, and was subsequently screened at the 2016 DOXA Documentary Film Festival. It was commercially distributed as a television broadcast, airing September 14, 2016 on TVOntario.

== Awards ==
At DOXA, the film received an honorable mention from the Colin Low Award jury.

In 2017 the film won the Canadian Hillman Prize, which honours journalists whose work identifies important social and economic issues in Canada, and the Canadian Association of Journalists Award for Labour Reporting.

The film was shortlisted for the Donald Brittain Award for Best Social or Political Documentary at the 6th Canadian Screen Awards in 2018.
