= The Good Canadian =

- Directed by: Leena Minifie; David Paperny
- Written by: Leena Minifie; David Paperny
- Produced by: Leena Minifie; David Paperny
- Cinematography: Alfonso Chin
- Edited by: Hart Snider
- Music by: Patric Caird; Matthew Cardinal; Cris_Derksen
- Production companies: Great Stories Productions Inc. Stories First Productions; APTN; CBC Docs
- Release date: September 30, 2025
- Running time: 88 minutes
- Country: Canada
- Language: English

The Good Canadian is a 2025 Canadian documentary film, co-directed by Leena Minifie and David Paperny. The film is an investigative documentary that traces the systemic dispossession of Indigenous people in present day back to the legacy of the Indian Act.

The film premiered on September 30, 2025 on APTN and CBC Television as a special National Day for Truth and Reconciliation broadcast.

== Awards ==
Award	Date of ceremony	Category	Recipient(s)	Result	Ref.
CMPA Indiescreen Awards	2025	Kevin Tierney Award for Best Emerging Producer	Leena Minifie	Won	
Canadian Screen Awards	2026	Donald Brittain Award for Best Social/Political Documentary Program	Leena Minifie, David Paperny, Sarah Jane Flynn	Nominated	
Canadian Screen Awards	2026	Barbara Sears Award for Best Editorial Research	Chantelle Bellrichard, Jennifer Chiu, Paul Barnsley, Derrick O’Keefe, Anna Mehler Paperny	Nominated	
