= Broke (2009 film) =

- Directed by: Rosvita Dransfeld
- Written by: Rosvita Dransfeld
- Produced by: Rosvita Dransfeld
- Starring: David Woolfson; Chris Hoard
- Cinematography: Sergio Olivares
- Edited by: Scott Parker
- Music by: Louis Sedmark; Van Wilmott
- Production company: ID Productions
- Distributed by: TVOntario
- Release date: 2009
- Running time: 77 minutes
- Country: Canada
- Language: English

Broke is a Canadian documentary film, directed by Rosvita Dransfeld and released in 2009. The film centres on the friendship between David Woolfson, a pawn shop owner in Edmonton, Alberta, and Chris Hoard, an ex-convict who volunteers as an assistant to Woolfson in the shop.

The film premiered at the 2009 Hot Docs Canadian International Documentary Festival, and was screened at the 2009 Vancouver International Film Festival and the 2009 Global Visions Film Festival, before having its television premiere on March 3, 2010 as an episode of TVOntario's documentary series The View from Here.

The film won the Donald Brittain Award for Best Social or Political Documentary Program at the 25th Gemini Awards in 2010.

Hoard was again featured in Dransfeld's 2014 film Anti-Social Limited, which was a Donald Brittain Award nominee at the 4th Canadian Screen Awards in 2016.
