= Leena Minifie =

Canadian film and television producer

Leena Minifie is an Indigenous film and television producer from Gitxaala Nation, British Columbia, most noted as a producer of the documentary television series British Columbia: An Untold History. She received two Canadian Screen Award nominations at the 10th Canadian Screen Awards in 2022 for her work on the series, for Best History Documentary Program or Series and Best Editorial Research.

She was also a producer of the short film The Cave, and an associate producer on the film and television series Bones of Crows.

She founded the film production company Stories First in 2007. In 2021 the company optioned the rights to produce a television adaptation of Joshua Whitehead's novel Jonny Appleseed.

In 2025, Tonya Williams selected Minifie as the recipient of the "pay it forward" grant for the Company 3 TFCA Luminary Award at the Toronto Film Critics Association Awards 2024.

Her film The Good Canadian, co-directed with David Paperny, was broadcast on September 30, 2025, as a National Day for Truth and Reconciliation special, and received a nomination for the Donald Brittain Award at the 14th Canadian Screen Awards in 2026.
