= Aftermath: The Remnants of War =

2001 film by Daniel Sekulich

- Directed by: Daniel Sekulich
- Written by: Allen Abel; Daniel Sekulich
- Produced by: Ed Barreveld; Michael Kot; Peter Starr
- Narrated by: John Jarvis
- Cinematography: Michael Grippo
- Edited by: Deborah Palloway
- Production company: National Film Board of Canada
- Release date: 2001
- Running time: 73 min
- Country: Canada
- Language: English

Aftermath: The Remnants of War is a 2001 Canadian documentary film about the painful legacy of war directed by Daniel Sekulich. Based on the Lionel Gelber Prize winning book of the same name by Donovan Webster, it is co-written by Sekulich and Allen Abel, and co-produced by the National Film Board of Canada and Aftermath Pictures.

Based on the award-winning book by Donovan Webster, this film exposes the human remains, environmental damage, and psychological trauma of military conflict which remain after the fighting stops and the troops go home. The program features interviews with individuals involved with the reparation of the residual devastation - people who destroy unexploded munitions at Verdun and in Sarajevo, recover and identify skeletons of battlefield casualties at Stalingrad, and help victims of Agent Orange in the A Luoi Valley, Vietnam. Archival footage sets each segment in its historical context.

Filmed on location in Russia, France, Bosnia and Vietnam, the documentary features personal accounts of individuals involved in the cleanup of war: from de-miners, psychologists working with distraught soldiers, a treasure hunter turned archeologist in Stalingrad, and scientists and doctors struggling with the contamination of dioxin used in the Vietnam War.

== Awards ==
- Columbus International Film & Animation Festival, Columbus, Ohio: Bronze Plaque, Humanities, 2001
- U.S. International Film and Video Festival, Redondo Beach, California: Gold Camera Award, Documentary, Current Events, Special Events, 2002
- FICA-International Festival of Environmental Films & Videos, Goiás, Brazil: UNESCO Prize for Best Humanitarian Film, 2002
- FICA-International Festival of Environmental Films & Videos, Goiás, Brazil: Special Jury Prize, 2002
- SUNCINE Festival International de Cinema Video del Medi Ambient, Barcelona: Special Prize, Documentary, 2002
- Religion Communicators Council, New York: Wilbur Award for Theatrical Film, 2002
- WorldFest-Houston International Film Festival, Houston: Gold Special Jury Award, Film and Video Production, Documentary, 2002
- New York Festivals, New York: Gold World Medal, International Affairs, 2002
