= There Are No Words =

- Directed by: Min Sook Lee
- Screenplay by: Min Sook Lee
- Produced by: Sherien Barsoum
- Cinematography: Iris Ng
- Edited by: Eui Yong Zong
- Music by: Andrew Yong Hoon Lee
- Production company: National Film Board of Canada
- Release date: September 9, 2025 (TIFF)
- Running time: 98 minutes
- Country: Canada
- Languages: English; Korean

There Are No Words is a Canadian documentary film, directed by Min Sook Lee and released in 2025. The film centres on Lee's search for greater understanding of the circumstances that led her mother, Song Ji, to commit suicide when Lee was just 12 years old.

The film premiered at the 2025 Toronto International Film Festival, where it received an honorable mention for the Best Canadian Film award.

Iris Ng won the Canadian Screen Award for Best Cinematography in a Documentary at the 14th Canadian Screen Awards in 2026. The film was a nominee for the DGC Allan King Award for Best Documentary Film at the 2026 Directors Guild of Canada awards.
