= Phyllis Ellis =

Canadian field hockey player

Phyllis Ellis (born 11 November 1959) is a Canadian hockey player, actor and director.

== Personal life ==
Ellis was born in Oakville, Ontario and grew up in the Greater Toronto Area. In high school, she performed in musical theatre and later obtained a Bachelor of Fine Arts degree with a major in classical theatre. As a child, she wanted to be an olympian, an actor and a director. She was married to a professional hockey player and has two children.

== Sports ==
She was part of the Canadian field hockey team in the 1984 Summer Olympics. The team finished fifth out of six.

In 1985, Ellis was hired as the women's coordinator for the Best Ever Ontario program as part of Ontario Ministry of Tourism. Under Ellis's leadership, the Female Athletes Motivating Excellence (FAME) program was initiated to promote increased female participation in sports programs. This initiative features high-profile female athletes, such as gold medalist Linda Thom, who visit schools and events to inspire girls and challenge stereotypes.

== Film and theatre ==
She founded a women's theatre company in Minneapolis, where she lived during her then-husband's hockey tenure.

She co-created the 2009 TV spinoff series Three Chords from the Truth. The series unfolds the adventures of Helena, portrayed by Ellis, as she navigates a struggling country music TV network, despite her limited knowledge of country music. Category: Woman is a documentary directed by Ellis that explores the question of gender identity and the controversial practice of sex testing in international sports and its impacts on female athletes.

=== Awards ===
Year	Award	Category	Work
2009	Gemini	Best Individual Performance in a Comedy Series	The Wilkinsons
2013	Donald Brittain Award	Best Social-Political Documentary	About Her
2019	Calgary International Film Festival	DGC Best Canadian Documentary Award	Toxic Beauty

=== Filmography ===
As director
Year	Title
2010	About Her
2015	Painted Land: In Search of the Group of Seven
2015	Girls Night Out
2019	Toxic Beauty
2022	Category: Woman

As actor
Year	Title
2006-2007	The Wilkinsons
2009	Three Chords from the Truth
2010	Call Me Fitz (guest appearance)
2011	The Listener (guest appearance)
2011	Murdoch Mysteries
2013	Lost Girl (guest appearance)
2013	It Was You Charlie (guest appearance)
