= Category Woman =

Category: Woman
- Directed by: Phyllis Ellis
- Written by: Phyllis Ellis
- Produced by: Howard Fraiberg
- Cinematography: Iris Ng
- Edited by: Eugene Weis
- Music by: Aaron Davis; Tuku
- Production companies: Orama Filmworks; Proximity Films
- Release date: April 2022 (Hot Docs)
- Running time: 76 minutes
- Country: Canada
- Language: English

Category: Woman is a Canadian documentary film, directed by Phyllis Ellis and released in 2022. The film centres on the cases of Dutee Chand, Evangeline Makena, Annet Negesa and Margaret Wambui, four female athletes whose medical privacy and human rights were violated over the issue of sex verification in sports. It also draws on, but does not centre, the related stories of Caster Semenya, Francine Niyonsaba and Christine Mboma.

The film premiered at the 2022 Hot Docs Canadian International Documentary Festival, before being broadcast on television by TVOntario in March 2023.

== Awards ==
Ellis won the Social Responsibility Award at the 2023 Canadian Sport Awards for the film, and was shortlisted for the 2023 DGC Allan King Award for Best Documentary Film.

The film was a nominee for the Donald Brittain Award for best social or political television documentary at the 12th Canadian Screen Awards in 2024.
