= Artificial Immortality =

- Directed by: Ann Shin
- Written by: Erica Leendertse; Julia Nunes; Ann Shin
- Produced by: Erica Leendertse; Hannah Donegan; Ann Shin
- Cinematography: Stephen Chung; Iris Ng
- Edited by: Shannon Kennedy; Stephen Taylor
- Music by: Todor Kobakov
- Production company: Fathom Film Group
- Release date: April 29, 2021 (Hot Docs)
- Running time: 74 minutes
- Country: Canada
- Language: English

Artificial Immortality, stylized as A.rtificial I.mmortality, is a Canadian documentary film, directed by Ann Shin and released in 2021. The film explores advances in artificial intelligence, focusing in particular on various efforts to use technological advances in the field to cheat death and achieve a version of immortality.

People appearing in the film include Nick Bostrom, Hiroshi Ishiguro, Douglas Rushkoff, Ben Goertzel and Deepak Chopra.

The film premiered on April 29, 2021, as the opening film of the Hot Docs Canadian International Documentary Festival.

== Awards ==
Award	Date of ceremony	Category	Recipient(s)	Result	Ref(s)
Directors Guild of Canada	2021	Best Picture Editing, Documentary	Stephen Taylor	Nominated	
Canadian Screen Music Awards	2022	Best Original Score for a Documentary Feature Film	Todor Kobakov	Won	
Canadian Screen Awards	2023	Best Documentary Program		Nominated	
Canadian Screen Awards	2023	Best Photography in a Documentary Program or Factual Series	Iris Ng, Stephen Chung	Nominated	
Canadian Screen Awards	2023	Best Original Music in a Television Documentary	Todor Kobakov	Nominated	
