= Toxic Beauty =

2019 film

- Film poster
- Directed by: Phyllis Ellis
- Produced by: White Pine Pictures
- Cinematography: Iris Ng
- Edited by: James Yates
- Music by: Robert Carli
- Production companies: Eggplant Picture & Sound; White Pine Pictures
- Release date: April 28, 2019 (Hot Docs)
- Running time: 91 minutes
- Countries: Canada; United States
- Language: English

Toxic Beauty is a 2019 Canadian-American documentary film about exposure to dangerous substances from commonly trusted beauty products such as baby powder. Directed by Phyllis Ellis and produced by White Pine Pictures, the film premiered at the April 2019 Hot Docs Canadian International Documentary Festival. The documentary follows the experiences and motivations of beauty product consumers as well as the experience of cancers caused by brand-name cosmetics, including but not limited to Johnson & Johnson. Features include interviews with scientists, doctors, and lawyers about the issues surrounding a substandard regulation system, and scientist Mymy Nguyen's journey of discovery as she seeks to replace commonly used products with safer ones.

== Content ==
Toxic Beauty addresses what it calls an attitude of silence around carcinogenic and hormone-disrupting substances found in previously approved and popular cosmetic items in the US cosmetics market. The documentary follows UC Davis graduate Mymy Nguyen after she has recovered from a benign cancer attributable to inappropriate use of talcum powder. Nguyen attempts to identify and replace various cosmetic items she has come to depend on while seeking further awareness and knowledge on reparation, or lack thereof, from the cosmetics industry.

The film interviews doctors, lawyers, and scientists to explore how products are made, and compares a long struggle with the cosmetics industry to decades of public pressure for reforms against the tobacco industry in the 1960s. It claims that thousands of dangerous chemicals in popular cosmetic products in the USA are unregulated, not even requiring appropriate warning labels when toxic substances have been identified. The relevant legislation is based on 1930s law and favors a "postmarket regulatory system", even though the act is updated and enforced to cover similar issues in food and drugs. With the assistance of environmentalist author Rick Smith, Nguyen explores the effects of certain substances on the body as well as the effectiveness of recovery.

One of the victims featured in the documentary turned down a $1.3m settlement offer from Johnson & Johnson so that she could publicise her experience with a court case.

One of the main issues in the documentary surrounds the popular Johnson & Johnson baby powder product. Johnson & Johnson denied knowledge of carcinogens in its baby powder, but were revealed to have known about them since the 1960s after being sued by 22 claimants in 2018, incurring $4.7 billion in damages. Subsequently, a further 11,700 claimants pursued damage claims against the company.

== Director ==
Director Phyllis Ellis, a Canadian Olympian in the 1980s, tries to make a connection between cosmetics and a higher rate of hormone-related illnesses among African-American women, including infertility and premature birth, and lack of regulation in hair care products which are promoted to target African-American women in the US.

== Critical reception ==
Jessica Defino for Vogue described Toxic Beauty as a documentary "that many will find shocking". NOW Toronto's Samantha Edwards says that after watching Toxic Beauty "you'll rush to your bathroom to check the labels of your shampoo and conditioner." Dorothy Woodend for The Tyee says, "Ellis’s film blows the lid off the issue with the precision of a Tomahawk missile." On Rotten Tomatoes the film has a 100% Critics Consensus score as of October 2021.

== Awards ==
Toxic Beauty won an award from the Calgary International Film Festival for the best 2019 Canadian documentary.
