= Tiger Spirit =

2008 Canadian documentary film

- Directed by: Min Sook Lee
- Written by: Min Sook Lee
- Produced by: Ed Barreveld
- Cinematography: Stan Barua; Mark Ellam; Michael Grippo
- Edited by: Ricardo Acosta
- Music by: Mark Korven
- Production company: Storyline Entertainment
- Distributed by: National Film Board of Canada
- Release date: April 20, 2008 (Hot Docs)
- Running time: 90 minutes
- Country: Canada
- Language: English

Tiger Spirit is a Canadian documentary film, directed by Min Sook Lee and released in 2008. Inspired in part by Lee's efforts to learn more about her own family background after it was fractured by the division of Korea, the film explores the complicated prospects for Korean reunification through various angles, including North Korea's 2000s lottery system that allowed some South Korean residents to visit North Korean relatives, and the efforts of South Korean journalist Lim Sun Nam to find proof of his beliefs that the Siberian tiger is not actually extinct in Korea, and that the Korean people will be healed and reunited after he finds one.

The film premiered at the 2008 Hot Docs Canadian International Documentary Festival. It was screened at various documentary film festivals in 2008, and was commercially distributed as a television broadcast, airing January 26, 2009 on History.

The film won the Donald Brittain Award for Best Social or Political Documentary at the 24th Gemini Awards in 2009.
