= Jane Alden Stevens =

- Born: 1952 (age 73–74)
- Education: Rochester Institute of Technology, Rochester, NY 1982 St. Lawrence University, Canton, NY 1974
- Known for: Photography

Jane Alden Stevens is an American photographer and educator. Solo exhibitions of her work have been mounted at the ARC Gallery in Chicago, the Herbert F. Johnson Museum of Art in Ithaca, NY, and the Pittsburgh Filmmakers Gallery. She has exhibited extensively abroad, including in Finland, Ukraine, Belgium, Germany, and Brazil. Stevens’ photographs are included in the permanent collections of the George Eastman House International Museum of Photography and Film in Rochester, NY, the Cincinnati Art Museum, and the Museu da Imagem e do Som in São Paulo, Brazil. She is Professor Emerita of Fine Arts at the University of Cincinnati.

== Early life and education ==
Following her graduation magna cum laude from St. Lawrence University in Canton, New York, with a BA in 19th-century European Studies, Stevens lived in Germany for several years, where she taught English as a second language and worked as a tour guide.

After returning to the United States, she attended an MFA program in photography at the Rochester Institute of Technology in Rochester, New York. After graduating in 1982, she was offered a position in the Fine Arts Department at the University of Cincinnati, where she began teaching courses in photography, film, and professional business practices for fine artists.

== Career ==
Stevens was a full-time fine arts faculty member at the University of Cincinnati's College of Design, Architecture, Art and Planning from 1984 to 2003. She is professor emerita of fine arts at the University of Cincinnati.

== Work ==
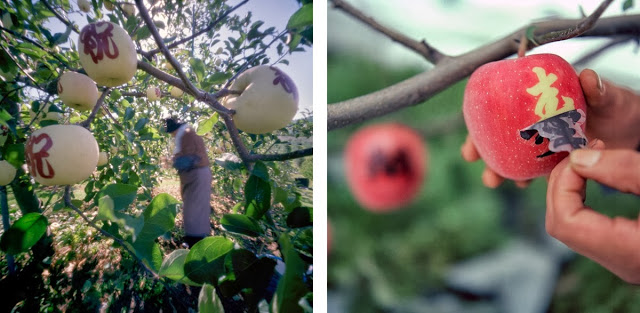
Seeking Perfection Apples

=== Seeking Perfection ===
The Seeking Perfection: Traditional Apple Growing in Japan portfolio documents a specialized form of apple cultivation in Aomori Prefecture, Japan. Stevens primarily used the Pinoramic 120, the Hasselblad, and the Noblex Pro 6/150U cameras to achieve different depths of field, perspectives, and degrees of proximity to her subjects.

=== Tears of Stone: World War I Remembered ===
This documented the war's lasting impact in large black-and-white images that included destruction still visible in barraged, upended, pockmarked fields; abandoned towns that were never rebuilt; mementos left by families who still make pilgrimages to World War I cemeteries and sculptures that record unhealed grief.

The project was supported by $23,000 from UC, the English Speaking Union and Ohio Arts Council. Stevens made five two-week trips to 189 sites and a selection of her photos was published in Tears of Stone: World War I Remembered.

== Selected permanent collections ==
- The Center for Photography as an Art Form, Bombay, India
- Center for Photography, Woodstock, NY
- Cincinnati Art Museum, Cincinnati, OH
- George Eastman House: International Museum of Photography & Film, Rochester, NY
- Harry Ransom Humanities Research Center, University of Texas, Austin, TX
- Museum of Fine Arts Houston
- Museum of Photography, Kharkiv, Ukraine
- Museu de Arte Contemporanea, São Paulo, Brazil

== Published books ==
- Stevens, Jane Alden (2004). Tears of Stone: World War I Remembered. Cincinnati, OH: Ohio Arts Council. ISBN 978-0-9743338-0-9.
- ——; Rand, Glenn; Horner, Garin (2015). Teaching Photography (2nd ed.). Massachusetts: Focal Press. ISBN 978-1-138-83854-3.
