= Rosvita Dransfeld =

Canadian documentary filmmaker

Rosvita Dransfeld, sometimes credited as Rosie Dransfeld, is a Canadian documentary filmmaker. She is most noted for her 2009 film Broke, which won the Donald Brittain Award for Best Social or Political Documentary at the 25th Gemini Awards in 2010.

Her other films have included Anti-Social Limited (2014), which was a Donald Brittain Award nominee at the 4th Canadian Screen Awards in 2016, and Her Last Project, which was broadcast as an episode of CBC Docs POV in October 2020.

In addition to her own work as a director, she is also frequently credited as a producer on the documentary films of Niobe Thompson.
