= Anti-Social Limited =

- Directed by: Rosvita Dransfeld
- Written by: Rosvita Dransfeld
- Produced by: Rosvita Dransfeld
- Starring: Chris Hoard
- Cinematography: Sergio Olivares
- Edited by: Scott Parker
- Music by: Donald Horsburgh
- Production company: ID Productions
- Distributed by: TVOntario
- Release date: May 1, 2014 (Hot Docs)
- Running time: 58 minutes
- Country: Canada
- Language: English

Anti-Social Limited is a Canadian documentary film, directed by Rosvita Dransfeld and released in 2014. A sequel to her 2009 film Broke, the film updates the story of ex-convict Chris Hoard as he endeavours to set up his own construction business despite having been diagnosed with antisocial personality disorder.

The film was a nominee for the Donald Brittain Award at the 4th Canadian Screen Awards in 2016.
