= El Contrato =

2003 Canadian documentary film

- Directed by: Min Sook Lee
- Written by: Min Sook Lee
- Produced by: Karen King-Chigbo
- Cinematography: David Patrick; John Westheuser
- Edited by: Katharine Asals
- Music by: Edgardo Moreno
- Production company: National Film Board of Canada
- Release date: September 24, 2003 (Bloor Cinema)
- Running time: 52 minutes
- Country: Canada
- Languages: English; Spanish

El Contrato (lit. "The Contract") is a Canadian documentary film, directed by Min Sook Lee and released in 2003. The film portrays the harsh living conditions of exploited migrant workers from Mexico who are working as farm labourers in Leamington, Ontario.

The film premiered at the Bloor Cinema on September 24, 2003, but the farmers depicted in the film issued a SLAPP suit which delayed the film's wider release. After the lawsuit was cleared, the film received further film festival screenings in 2004, before being broadcast by TVOntario on January 12, 2005.

Lee subsequently returned to the theme of migrant workers in her 2016 film Migrant Dreams, which centred on similar exploitation of Indonesian temporary migrant workers.

== Critical response ==
Frank Loreto of the Canadian Review of Materials wrote that "El Contrato is a hard-hitting film. A number of men are given the chance to send messages home, and it is clear that they are not happy being away. They miss their families and would much rather be home. They simply have no choice as there is no work at home and their families need the support that they are able to provide. One worker breaks into tears when he learns that his wife has delivered their baby girl prematurely. He had hoped to be home in time. Workers relate stories of abuses and mistreatment only when they are assured that their faces will not be filmed."

== Awards ==
The film was shortlisted for the Donald Brittain Award for Best Social or Political Documentary at the 20th Gemini Awards in 2005.
