= My Indian Name =

- Directed by: Abraham Côté
- Written by: Abraham Côté
- Produced by: Jason Brennan
- Cinematography: Patrick Kaplin
- Edited by: Randy Kelly
- Music by: Pierre-Yves Martel
- Production company: Nish Media
- Distributed by: APTN
- Release date: September 30, 2022
- Running time: 42 minutes
- Country: Canada
- Language: English

My Indian Name is a Canadian television documentary film, directed by Abraham Côté and released in 2022. The film explores the history of personal names in First Nations communities in Canada, both the way traditional indigenous names were often stripped away from First Nations peoples and their contemporary efforts to reclaim them.

Côté, an Algonquin/Anishinabeg filmmaker from Kitigan Zibi, Quebec, is himself descended from a family whose traditional surname was Pizindewatch, which meant "listener" and was thus changed to Écouté by a French priest before morphing into the more common French surname Côté.

The film premiered on APTN in September 2022, and was screened theatrically at the 2023 Asinabka Film and Media Arts Festival.

The film was a nominee for the Donald Brittain Award for best social or political television documentary at the 11th Canadian Screen Awards in 2023.
