= Min Sook Lee =

Canadian filmmaker and activist (born 1969)

- 이민숙
- Born: 1969 (age 56–57); South Korea
- Education: York University
- Occupations: Filmmaker; screenwriter; academic; political activist
- Employer: OCAD University
- Notable credits: Tiger Spirit (2008); She's the Mayor (2011); The Real Inglorious Bastards (2012)
- Political party: New Democratic Party

Min Sook Lee (Korean: 이민숙; born 1969) is a Canadian documentary filmmaker, screenwriter, academic, and political activist.

== Early life ==
Lee was born in South Korea and immigrated to Canada with her family at the age of three, growing up in downtown Toronto, where her family owned a convenience store. Lee and her sisters worked long hours behind the counters, often translating for their parents, who did not speak English.

As a teenager, Lee joined the anti-apartheid movement in Toronto, which she credits with introducing her to political activism.

== Film career ==
Lee is a self-taught documentary filmmaker who has directed eight feature documentaries, often focusing on labour, migration, and social justice issues.

Early in her career, Lee was news director at community radio station CKLN-FM from 1996 to 1998, an assistant to documentary filmmaker Sylvia Sweeney, and a news reporter at television station Toronto 1 from 2004 to 2005.

Lee's first feature film, El Contrato (2003), showed migrant farm workers from Central Mexico facing harsh working conditions in Leamington, Ontario. In response, Leamington farmers issued a SLAPP suit which delayed the film's release by a year. Lee was awarded the Cesar E. Chavez Black Eagle Award for the film, which was also a nominee for the Donald Brittain Award for Best Social or Political Documentary at the 20th Gemini Awards in 2005.

Lee's 2005 film Hogtown: The Politics of Policing followed a dysfunctional City Hall struggle over the Toronto Police Service's budget during a wave of violent gun crimes and police corruption scandals. The film won the Best Canadian Feature Documentary award at the Hot Docs Canadian International Documentary Festival.

Her 2008 film Tiger Spirit told the story of Korean families divided by the Korean War and the border between North Korea and South Korea, and won the Donald Brittain Award at the 24th Gemini Awards in 2009.

She subsequently directed My Toxic Baby (2009), about toxins in baby products; The Real MASH (2010), which tells the story of the real people who inspired the movie and television series M*A*S*H; Badge of Pride (2010), about LGBT police officers; and The Real Inglorious Bastards (2012), about Frederick Mayer and his company of European Jewish refugees.

The Real Inglorious Bastards won the Canadian Screen Award for Best History or Biography Documentary Program or Series at the 2nd Canadian Screen Awards in 2014, where Lee also received a nomination for Best Direction in a Documentary Program.

Lee was co-creator of the television sitcom She's the Mayor, which aired on VisionTV.

In 2016, Lee revisited the theme of migrant workers in Canada in her film Migrant Dreams, which examined the plight of a group of mostly Indonesian migrant workers entering Canada through the Temporary Foreign Worker Program. She was awarded the Canadian Hillman Prize, which honours journalists whose work identifies important social and economic issues in Canada, and the Canadian Association of Journalists Award for Labour Reporting. It also received an honorable mention from the Colin Low Award jury at the 2016 DOXA Documentary Film Festival, and was shortlisted for the Donald Brittain Award at the 6th Canadian Screen Awards.

Her 2025 film There Are No Words, a more personal film than her prior work, explored her mother's suicide when Lee was a teenager.

In 2012, the Mayworks Festival of Working People and the Arts named the Min Sook Lee Labour Arts Award in Lee's honour for her contribution to the cause of migrant workers, citing her work to "engage non-arts audiences, and that challenges Eurocentric notions of art".

Lee is a professor at OCAD University, where her teaching and research focus on the relationship between art and social change. additionally Lee occupies the position of president at OCAD's faculty union, OCADFA. She previously taught documentary filmmaking at Ryerson University's School of Image Arts MFA program.

In 2026, Lee endorsed Avi Lewis in that year's federal NDP leadership race.

=== Filmography ===
Year	Title	Project	Notes
2001-2002	Profiles	12-part TV documentary series	Senior producer (3 episodes), director (3 episodes), field producer (1 episode)
2003	El Contrato	Documentary	Director, writer
2005	Hogtown: The Politics of Policing	Documentary	Producer, director, writer
2008	Tiger Spirit	Documentary	Producer, director, writer
2009	My Toxic Baby	Documentary	Director, writer
2010	Badge of Pride	Documentary	Director, writer
2010	The Real M*A*S*H	TV documentary	Director, writer
2011	She's the Mayor	Television sitcom series	Co-creator, executive producer (12 episodes), writer (1 episode)
2012	The Real Inglorious Bastards	TV documentary	Director, writer
2016	Migrant Dreams	Documentary	Producer, director, writer
2025	There Are No Words	Documentary	Director, writer

== Political activity ==
Lee was the New Democratic Party candidate in Toronto—Danforth for the 2019 federal election. In her campaign, she committed to bring in a one per cent super-wealth tax on households with a net wealth of more than $20 million. The Parliamentary Budget Office has estimated that this measure could bring in $70 billion in new revenue.

On election night, Lee finished in second with 33.2 per cent of the vote to incumbent Liberal MP Julie Dabrusin.

=== Electoral record ===
2019 Canadian federal election: Toronto—Danforth
Party	Candidate	Votes	%	±%	Expenditures
Liberal	Julie Dabrusin	27,681	47.68	+5.34	$75,766
New Democratic	Min Sook Lee	19,283	33.21	-6.96	$102,067
Conservative	Zia Choudhary	6,091	10.49	+0.63	$19,351
Green	Chris Tolley	3,761	6.48	+1.77	
People's	Tara Dos Remedios	621	1.07	-	$3,633
Animal Protection	Elizabeth Abbott	261	0.45	-0.19	$2,645
Independent	John Kladitis	210	0.36	-	$2,953
Communist	Ivan Byard	151	0.26	-	
Total valid votes/expense limit		58,059	100.0		
Total rejected ballots		413			
Turnout		58,472	71.9		
Eligible voters		81,283			
Liberal hold		Swing		+6.15	
Source: Elections Canada
