= Liz Marshall =

Canadian film director

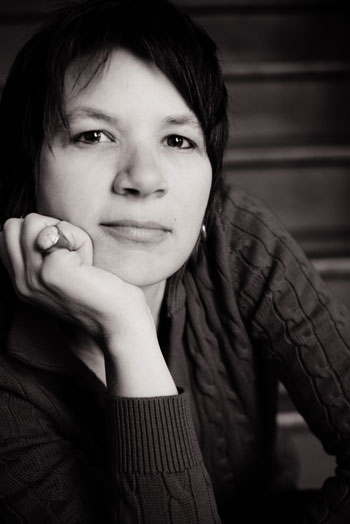
- Born: Toronto, Ontario, Canada
- Education: Ryerson University (now Toronto Metropolitan University), York University
- Occupation: Filmmaker
- Years active: 1994–present

Liz Marshall is a Canadian filmmaker based in the Greater Vancouver area. Since the 1990s, she has directed and produced independent projects and been part of film and television teams, creating broadcast, theatrical, campaign and cross-platform documentaries shot around the world. Marshall's feature-length documentaries largely focus on social justice and environmental themes through strong characters. She is known for The Ghosts in Our Machine and for Water on the Table, for which she also produced impact and engagement campaigns, and attended many global events as a public speaker. Water on the Table features water rights activist, author and public figure Maude Barlow. The Ghosts in Our Machine features animal rights activist, photojournalist and author Jo-Anne McArthur.

== Biography ==
In the early 1990s, Liz Marshall studied film, video and photography in the Media Arts program at Ryerson University (now Toronto Metropolitan University) in Toronto.

In the mid 1990s, as a queer and emerging filmmaker, she took on her first TV job as a co-host and a lead producer for the groundbreaking cable show Cable 10%. As part of an all-volunteer team, she produced, shot and edited dozens of weekly segments for the program.

She has since worked as a director, writer, producer, executive producer, videographer and cinematographer, often collaborating with award-winning filmmakers and producers. Her body of work includes productions featuring musicians, dancers and authors, as well as documentaries for organizations. Marshall often assembles production teams under the auspices of her company LizMars Productions.

Clients, employers, broadcasters and partner organizations have included: Righteous Babe Records; CHUM Limited television channels Bravo!, MuchMusic, BookTelevision; War Child Canada; The Griffin Trust for Excellence in Poetry; Canadian Journalists for Free Expression; Right To Play; the Stephen Lewis Foundation; Plan Canada; MTV Canada; CTV; the Independent Film Channel; W Network; TVO; Knowledge Network; CBC; Fusion Network; Netflix; the Animal Legal Defense Fund; the New England Anti-Vivisection Society; Animal Equality UK; We Animals; Farm Sanctuary; Women Make Movies; the Bertha BRITDOC Connect Fund and Viceland.

As an active member of the Canadian film community, Marshall has served for three terms (2011-2016) as an elected board member of the Toronto chapter of the Documentary Organization of Canada, which formed the DOC Institute, the collective voice for Toronto’s indie documentary filmmakers. She is a core member of the Toronto chapter of Film Fatales, a global collective of female directors dedicated to the creation of more films and television by and about women.

In 1995, American folk singer-songwriter Ani DiFranco and her independent record label Righteous Babe Records commissioned Liz Marshall to document Ani on tour in parts of Canada and the US. Marshall directed a multimedia archival collage consisting of super 8mm, 16mm film, hi-8 video, and DAT recordings.

In 2013, Marshall declined a Queen Elizabeth II Diamond Jubilee Medal along with Maude Barlow, Naomi Klein and Sarah Slean.

In 2017, Marshall completed her Master of Fine Arts in Cinema Production at York University.

In 2026, Marshall endorsed Avi Lewis in that year's federal NDP leadership race.

== Filmography ==
=== Documentaries ===
- Meat the Future (2020)
- The Ghosts in Our Machine (2013) (featuring Jo-Anne McArthur)

(Director, producer, writer, co-cinematographer)

- Water on the Table (2010) (featuring Maude Barlow)

(Director, producer, writer, co-cinematographer)

- The Rawside of... the Bourbon Tabernacle Choir (2008)

(Director)

- Girls of Latitude (2008) (featuring Nicole Holness, Diane Salema, and Aliya-Jasmine Sovani)

(Director)

- HIV/AIDS Trilogy (2007) for the Stephen Lewis Foundation

(Director, Producer) Grandmothers: The Unsung Heroes of Africa / A Generation of Orphans / Women: The Face of AIDS /

- Inside Your Threads (2004) (featuring Hawksley Workman, Jully Black, Sam Roberts)

(Co-Director, Cinematographer)

- Voices of Dissent: The Struggle For Freedom of Expression in Turkey (2002) (featuring Daniel Richler)

(Director, Producer)

- Musicians in the War Zone (2001) (featuring The Rascalz, David Usher, Chantal Kreviazuk, Raine Maida)

(Director, Cross-Platform Field Producer)

=== Shorts and music videos ===
- Mawal Saba (2007) (featuring Maryem Hassan Tollar)

(Director)

- Listen (2005) (featuring Sexsmith & Kerr – Ron Sexsmith and Don Kerr)

(Director)

- The Weight of Memory (2001) (featuring Peggy Baker)

(Director)

- Messages: To the World's Leaders (2000) (for War Child Canada)

(Director, Producer)

- Ani Does Laundry (1997) (featuring Ani DiFranco)

(Director, producer, Writer)

- Chemical Valley (1995) (featuring Kyp Harness)

(Director)

== Awards, nominations and distinctions ==
=== 2015 ===
For The Ghosts in Our Machine

- Donald Brittain Award for Best Social/Political Documentary, Canadian Screen Awards nomination

(Shared with fellow Producer Nina Beveridge)

- Best Direction in a Documentary Program, Canadian Screen Awards nomination
- Best Photography in a Documentary Program, Canadian Screen Awards nomination

(Shared with fellow Cinematographers John Price, Iris Ng, Nicholas de Pencier)

- Best Sound in a Documentary Program, Canadian Screen Awards

(Garrett Kerr, Daniel Pellerin, Jason Milligan)

=== 2014 ===
For The Ghosts in Our Machine

- Official Honoree, 18th Annual Webby Awards, Best Use of Interactive Video

(Shared with Interactive Directors The Goggles, and fellow Interactive Producers Nina Beveridge, Sean Embury)

- Shortlist, International LUSH Prize

=== 2013 ===
For The Ghosts in Our Machine

- Top Transformational Film, Viewers Choice Award
- Top Ten Audience Favourite Award, Hot Docs Film Festival
- Best Nature/Environment Golden Sheaf Award, Yorkton Film Festival
- Special Jury Prize – International Competition, DMZ Docs
- Best Canadian Feature, Planet in Focus Environmental Film Festival
- Green Screen Award, 2nd place, Planet in Focus Environmental Film Festival
- Top Twenty Audience Favourite Award, IDFA
- Best Director in a Documentary, nomination, Yorkton Film Festival

=== 2012 ===
- Queen Elizabeth II Diamond Jubilee Medal

Marshall respectfully declined the honour in support of the Idle No More movement.

=== 2011 ===
For Water on the Table

- Honourable Mention, Canada's Environmental Media Awards
- Featured Canadian Film for Cinema Politica

=== 2010 ===
For Water on the Table

- Best Canadian Feature award, Planet in Focus Environmental Film Festival
- Donald Brittain Award for Best Social/Political Documentary, Gemini Award nomination

=== 2005 ===
For Inside Your Threads

(Produced by Tania Natscheff of MuchMusic)

- Shortlisted for the CIDA Deborah Fletcher Award
- Gold medal, Canadian Association of Broadcasters (CAB)
- Bronze medal, New York International Film Festival

=== 2001 ===
For Musicians in the War Zone

(Produced by Dr. Samantha Nutt, Eric Hoskins of War Child Canada, and Denise Donlon, Tania Natscheff of MuchMusic)

- Gold medal, Cable in the Classroom
- Gold medal, Canadian Association of Broadcasters (CAB)
- Bronze medal, New York International Film Festival
