= Glenn Rand =

Glenn Rand (February 10, 1944 – April 26, 2021) was an American photographic artist, educator and writer. He has produced photographic art that has been included in public museum collections throughout the United States, Japan, and Europe. He has written twelve books on photography and contributed regularly to magazines. In 2009, the Photo Imaging Education Association (PIEA) presented him with its "Excellence in Education Award" for his insightful contributions to photographic education.

== Early life and higher education ==
Glenn Rand was born on a family farm outside of Dayton, Ohio before living through his childhood years in the Cincinnati area. After receiving his Bachelor of Arts degree at Purdue University in 1966 with a Major in Humanities and Design, Rand continued at Purdue, acquiring a Master of Art in Industrial and Environmental Design in 1968. During his studies at Purdue, he became involved in Fine-art photography, studying with Vernon Cheek. He received a High School Teaching Certificate in 1975 at Edgecliff College, and a Doctor of Education in 1978 at the University of Cincinnati. He did post-doctoral study and research as a visiting scholar at the University of Michigan.

== Teaching ==
Rand's 50-year teaching career started in 1966 while pursuing graduate work. Rand has taught in public education, community colleges and universities. Major teaching or administrative positions include Purdue University(1966-1972), Colorado Mountain College (1975-1980), Lansing Community College (1980-2000) and Brooks Institute (2001-2012). During his career, he has created and/or redesigned curricula for multiple forms of art such as fine art photography, commercial photography, digital imaging, crafts and allied curricula.

== Works ==
Rand is known for his traditional silver gelatin prints and digital fine-art photography. His fine-art photography has been acquired into over 30 permanent collections and has been exhibited throughout the United States and abroad.

He has worked professionally, specializing in table-top illustration primarily for editorial content. Rand has also consulted with corporate and educational clients, including the Eastman Kodak Company, the Ford Motor Company, the Photo Marketing Association International, the Ministry of Education of Finland, other businesses, and several colleges.

== Works in permanent collections ==
A selected list of the more than 30 permanent collections that include Rand's work:

- Center For Creative Photography
- Cincinnati Art Museum
- Crocker Museum of Art
- Dayton Art Institute
- Denver Art Museum
- Finnish Museum of Photography
- High Museum of Art
- Museum of Fine Art - Houston
- Santa Barbara Museum of Art

== Published works ==
- Rand, Glenn; Litschel, David R. (1994). Black & White Photography. Minneapolis/St. Paul: West Pub. Co. ISBN 978-0-314-02460-2.
- —— (2005). Digital Photographic Capture. Elsevier/Focal Press. ISBN 978-0-240-80632-7.
- ——; Zakia, Richard D. (2006). Teaching photography: Tools for the Imaging Educator. Burlington, MA: Focal Press. ISBN 978-0-240-80767-6.
- —— (2008). Film & Digital Techniques for Zone System Photography. Buffalo, N.Y: Amherst Media. ISBN 978-1-58428-227-3.
- —— (2008). Lighting for Photography: Techniques for Studio and Location Shoots. Buffalo, N.Y: Amherst Media. ISBN 978-1-58428-226-6.
- —— (2009). Lighting and Photographing Transparent and Translucent Surfaces: a Comprehensive Guide to Photographing Glass, Water, and More. Buffalo, NY: Amherst Media. ISBN 978-1-60895-175-8.
- ——; Meyer, Tim (2010). The Portrait: Understanding Portrait Photography. Santa Barbara, CA: Rocky Nook. OCLC 904586752.
- ——; Broughton, Chris; Quintenz-Fiedler, Amanda (2011). Capture: Digital Photography Essentials. Santa Barbara, CA: Rocky Nook. ISBN 978-1-4571-0341-4.
- ——; Meyer, Tim (2014). Shaping Light: Use Light Modifiers to Create Amazing Studio and Location Photographs. New York: Amherst Media. ISBN 978-1-60895-705-7.
