= Ed Barreveld =

Canadian documentary film producer

Ed Barreveld (born 1957 in Rotterdam) is a Canadian documentary film producer based in Toronto who co-founded Storyline Entertainment in 2000 with Daniel Sekulich and Michael Kot. Since 2004 he has been the company's sole principal.

Barreveld emigrated to Canada at the age of 23 and began his career in film in 1986, working at the National Film Board of Canada (NFB), eventually becoming studio administrator of the NFB's Ontario Studio in Toronto from 1988 to 1996, before leaving for the private sector.

His credits include the two-time Gemini Award nominee Aftermath: The Remnants of War (2000), the Gemini Award-winning Shipbreakers (2005), Tiger Spirit (2009), the Canadian Screen Award winning The Real Inglorious Bastards (2014), the Emmy Award-winning Herman's House (2014), The World Before Her (2014), named to TIFF's Top Ten List, and the Canadian Screen Award nominee Frame 394 (2016). In 2016, he was honoured by the Hot Docs Canadian International Documentary Festival with its Don Haig Award, recognizing his "creative vision and entrepreneurship, as well as a track record of mentoring emerging Canadian filmmakers."

In 2024 he was recognized with the Rogers-DOC Luminary Award as an individual who embodies the creative spirit of the Canadian documentary tradition and displays generosity by supporting the next generation of doc-makers through mentorship, working behind the scenes to ensure that the genre remains strong for generations to come.
