= Mark Korven =

Canadian composer

- Korven in 2026

Background information
- Born: Swift Current, Saskatchewan, Canada
- Occupation: Composer
- Website: www.markkorven.com

Mark Korven is a Canadian musician and composer for film and television.

== Career ==
During his early career in Winnipeg, Korven performed in a variety of rock and jazz music ensembles, mostly playing the guitar and singing in local bars. In 1977, he started taking formal music education at the Grant MacEwan Community College in Edmonton where he studied jazz and orchestration. After graduating, he developed into a singer / songwriter and recorded his first album of left-of-center pop entitled "Passengers". In 1987 he moved to Toronto, where he recorded the album "Ordinary Man" with Duke Street Records, and that same year he had his first chance at composing for film, with the score for Patricia Rozema's debut feature I've Heard the Mermaids Singing. which went on to win the La Prix de la Jeunesse at the Cannes Film Festival.

His work includes the music on the sci-fi horror cult film Cube (1997), collaborations with director Robert Eggers on the period horror films The Witch (2015) and The Lighthouse (2019), Scott Derrickson's The Black Phone (2022), and Arkasha Stevenson's The First Omen (2024).

Korven plays several exotic instruments, including the Sarangi, the Nyckelharpa, the Duduk, the Erhu, and the water phone. He was also responsible for the co-creation of "The Apprehension Engine", a custom made musical instrument intended for the creation of unsettling noises to be used on scoring horror films, built by guitar luthier Tony Duggan-Smith.

== Works ==
=== Film ===
- 1987 – I've Heard the Mermaids Singing
- 1990 – White Room
- 1991 – Sam & Me
- 1992 – The Grocer's Wife
- 1992 – Voices from the Shadows
- 1994 – Henry & Verlin
- 1994 – The Michelle Apartments
- 1995 – Curtis's Charm
- 1996 – Lyddie (TV)
- 1996 – Joe's Wedding
- 1996 – Giant Mine
- 1997 – Cube
- 1999 – Win, Again! (TV)
- 1999 – The Sheldon Kennedy Story (TV)
- 2000 – Falling Through
- 2000 – Saint Jude
- 2001 – Tagged: The Jonathan Wamback Story (TV)
- 2014 – Cruel and Unusual
- 2015 – The Witch
- 2017 – Awakening the Zodiac
- 2018 – Our House
- 2019 – The Lighthouse
- 2021 – No One Gets Out Alive
- 2021 – Resident Evil: Welcome to Raccoon City
- 2022 – The Black Phone
- 2024 – Night Swim
- 2024 – The First Omen
- 2024 – Don't Move

=== Television ===
- 1988 – The Twilight Zone
- 1991 – Grand Larceny
- 1993–1994 – Destiny Ridge
- 1997 – Michael Grey Eyes
- 1997 – The New Ice Age
- 1997–1999 – A Scattering of Seeds
- 1999–2003 – The Nature of Things
- Love Is Not Enough
- 2002 – New Year's Resolutions
- 2002 – Friday the 13th: The Devil in Dover
- 2003 – The Ex-Factor
- 2003 – Talk Mogadishu: Media Under Fire
- 2003 – Hollywood Wives: The New Generation
- 2004 – Winning
- 2005 – The Dark Years
- 2007 – America at a Crossroads
- 2008–2010 – The Border
- 2019 – The Terror: Infamy
- 2020–2021 – Them: Covenant
- 2020–2021 – Chapelwaite
- 2022 — The Peripheral

=== Documentaries ===
- 1990 – Transplant, the Breath of Life
- 1990 – Between Two Worlds
- 1994 – Lawn and Order
- 1994 – The Lucky Ones: Allied Airmen in Buchenwald
- 1996 – Power
- 1997 – Confessions of a Rabid Dog
- 1998 – The Man Who Might Have Been: An Inquiry into the Life and Death of Herbert Norman
- 2001 – A Moment in Time: The United Colours of Bronstein
- 2003 – Arctic Dreamer
- 2004 – Shake Hands with the Devil: The Journey of Roméo Dallaire
- 2005 – Hogtown: The Politics of Policing
- 2005 – The Ungrateful Dead: In Search of International Justice
- 2006 – The Man Who Couldn't Sleep
- 2007 – Triage: Dr. James Orbinski's Humanitarian Dilemma
- 2005 – Nugliak
- 2007 – A Promise to the Dead: The Exile Journey of Ariel Dorfman
- 2007 – Turning Pages: The Life and Literature of Margaret Atwood
- 2008 – Tiger Spirit
- 2009 – The Experimental Eskimos
- 2009 – Pushing the Line: Art Without Reservations
- 2011 – Earth from Space
- 2013 – Fight like Soldiers, Die like Children
- 2016 – All Governments Lie: Truth, Deception and the Spirit of I. F. Stone

=== Video games ===
- 2024 – Until Dawn

== Awards and nominations ==
During his career, Korven has received several awards, many at the Gemini Awards, Genie Awards and the Hot Docs Canadian International Documentary Festival.

=== List of awards ===
Gemini Awards

- 2008 – Won – Best Original Music Score for a Documentary Program or Series: "A Promise to the Dead: The Exile Journey of Ariel Dorfman"
- 2008 – Nominated – Best Original Music Score for a Program or Series: The Border For episode "Enemy Contact"
- 2005 – Nominated – Best Original Music Score for a Documentary Program or Series: "Continuous Journey", award shared with:

Philip Strong, Kiran Ahluwalia, Ben Grossman, Ravi Naimpally

- 2000 – Nominated – Best Original Music Score for a Program or Mini-Series: "The Sheldon Kennedy Story"
- 1999 – Nominated – Best Original Music Score for a Program or Mini-Series: "Win, Again!"
- 1992 – Nominated – Best Original Music Score for a Program or Mini-Series: "Between Two Worlds"

Genie Awards

- 1999 – Nominated – Best Music Score: "Cube"
- 1996 – Nominated – Best Achievement in Music – Original Score: "The Michelle Apts."
- 1996 – Won – Best Achievement in Music – Original Score: "Curtis's Charm"
- 1994 – Nominated – Best Music Score: "Henry & Verlin"
- 1993 – Nominated – Best Music Score: "The Grocer's Wife"
- 1991 – Nominated – Best Music Score: "White Room"

Yorkton Short Film & Video Festival

- 2005 – Won Golden Sheaf Award – Best Original Music, Non-Fiction: "Continuous Journey", award shared with: Philip Strong, Kiran Ahluwalia, Ben Grossman, Ravi Naimpally
