= Toronto Vegetarian Association =

Canadian charitable organization promoting vegetarianism

- Type: Nonprofit
- Founded: 1945; Toronto, Ontario
- Headquarters: 192 Spadina Ave, Suite 319, Toronto, Ontario M5T 2C2, Canada
- Area served: Greater Toronto Area
- Website: Official Site

The Toronto Vegetarian Association (TVA), also known as VegTO, is a volunteer-driven, charitable organization based in Toronto, Ontario. Founded in 1945, its mission is to inspire people to choose a healthier, greener, more compassionate lifestyle through plant-based eating.

Held every September since 1985 at Harbourfront Centre in Toronto, the organization's Annual Veg Food Fest attracts over 40,000 visitors annually and is the largest event of its kind in the world and is credited with having inspired a copycat VegFest movement in the United States, where over 120 such events were scheduled for 2018 and more for 2019. The event provides opportunities for visitors to learn about vegetarian issues and to sample vegetarian foods from diverse cuisines.

The Toronto Vegetarian Association operates a number of other projects, providing information and support through its website, a drop-in resource centre, and a directory of vegetarian-friendly businesses in the Toronto area. The organization also conducts campaigns such as the Veggie Challenge, which challenges non-vegetarians to adopt a vegetarian/vegan diet for one week. The 7th Totally Fabulous Vegan Bake-Off took place in 2015, selling out to over 500 attendees, and the 6th Veggie Parade in May 2015 marched through downtown Toronto, ending at Kensington Market.

As of 2019, the Toronto Vegetarian Association also now hosts an annual Veg Spring Market in April or May, and a Holiday Market in late November.

In 2010, the Toronto Vegetarian Association joined with Earthsave Canada and Lundi Sans Viande in launching a Canadian Meatless Mondays campaign.

Individuals can become a member of the Toronto Vegetarian Association with a minimal annual gift of $25. Members receive a Toronto Veg Card which gives discounts at over 120 restaurants and health food stores across the GTA, as well a subscription to the organization's magazine Lifelines with articles on vegetarian restaurants, cookbooks, fashion, nutrition, and more. Members' events are also held throughout the year such as bus trips to local farmed animal sanctuaries.

== See also ==
- List of vegetarian and vegan festivals
- North American Vegetarian Society
- International Vegetarian Union
- List of vegetarian and vegan organizations
