= Daniel Sekulich =

Daniel Sekulich is a Canadian journalist, director and documentary filmmaker who has worked in various places including Vietnam, Russia, Bosnia and the Arctic. He has written book reviews for the Arts section of The Globe and Mail, and authored the books, Terror On The Seas, and Ocean Titans. He is the director of the documentaries Borderline, Aftermath: The Remnants of War and Deadly Inheritance, and has worked on the television series Ice Road Truckers, Cold Water Cowboys and Greatest Tank Battles.

== Writings ==
Sekulich’s first book was Ocean Titans: Journeys in Search of the Soul of a Ship (2006 in Canada), in which he delved into the world of merchant shipping to understand the ageless appeal of ships and the sea and attempt to answer the question: does a ship have a soul? Ocean Titans was an honorable mention for the 2007 Keith Matthews Award for the Best Book, and released in the United States by Lyons Press in 2007.

His second book, Terror on the Seas: True Tales of Modern Day Pirates (2009) looked into the world of high seas piracy, a multinational, multibillion-dollar enterprise controlled by organized crime and local warlords. It was released in Canada, the United States, Brazil, Italy and the Middle East.

== Films ==
Sekulich’s first documentary was Deadly Inheritance (1997), a look at the human impact of genetic testing, nominated for a Hot Docs! award. It followed a woman undergoing genetic testing for Huntington's disease. It was followed by Aftermath: The Remnants of War (2001), a feature-length documentary about the painful legacy of war. Filmed on location in Russia, France, Bosnia and Vietnam, the documentary features personal accounts of individuals involved in the cleanup of war. It won United Nations Educational, Scientific, and Cultural Organization (UNESCO) Prize for Best Humanitarian Film.

His 2012 film, Borderline, explored the Canada-US border after 9/11 and people living nearby.
