= Michelle Shephard =

Canadian journalist (born 1972)

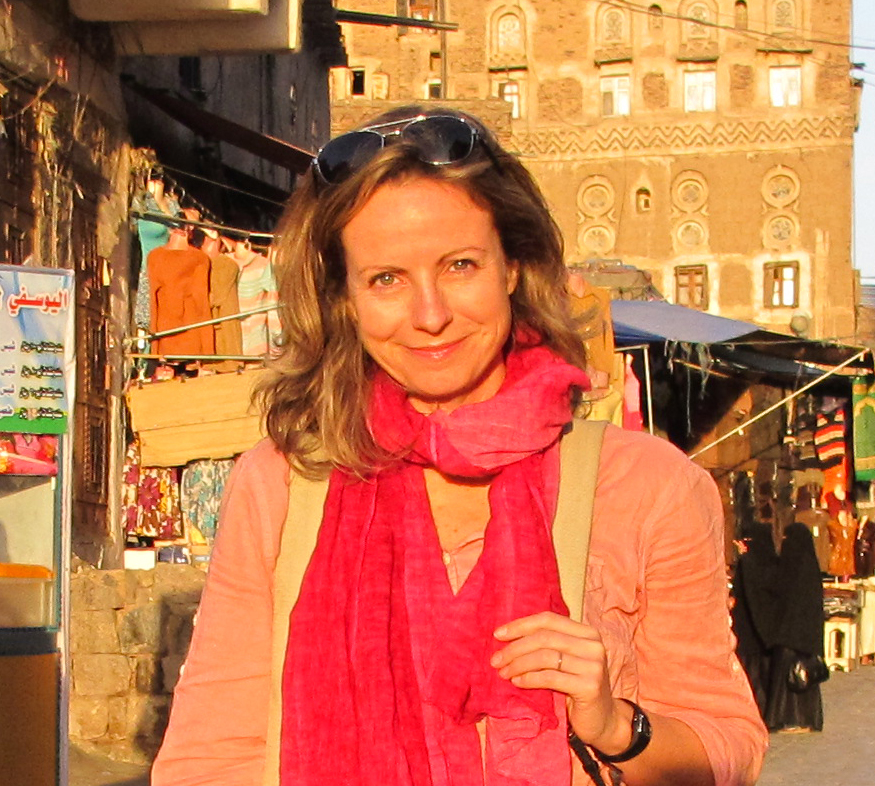
- Born: 1972 (age 53–54)
- Occupations: Author, journalist, filmmaker
- Spouse: Jim Rankin
- Awards: Michener Award, National Newspaper Awards

Michelle Shephard (born 1972) is a Canadian independent investigative reporter (previously with the Toronto Star newspaper), author and filmmaker. She has been awarded the Michener Award for public service journalism and won Canada's top newspaper prize, the National Newspaper Award, three times. In 2011, she was an associate producer on a documentary called Under Fire: Journalists in Combat. She produced the National Film Board documentary, Prisoners of the Absurd, which premiered at Amsterdam's film festival in 2014. Shephard also co-directed a film based on her book about Omar Khadr, Guantanamo's Child, which premiered at the Toronto International Film Festival in September 2015.

Shephard was the 2015 recipient of the Atkinson Fellowship in Public Policy.

== Life ==
Michelle grew up in Thornhill, Ontario, and attended Thornhill Secondary School. She began working at the Star in 1995 as a summer student, when she met her future husband Jim Rankin. Shephard left the Toronto Star in July 2018 when the paper closed its foreign news department. She is the author of Guantanamo's Child, a book that revolves about the ordeal of Omar Khadr in the Guantanamo Bay detention camps. She was also thanked in the foreword of the 2006 book Betrayed: The Assassination of Digna Ochoa by fellow Star reporter Linda Diebel, as well as Marina Nemat's 2008 book Prisoner of Tehran.

Her second book, Decade of Fear: Reporting from Terrorism's Grey Zone, was published in September 2011. The book was nominated for one of Canada's most prestigious literary awards, the BC National Award for Canadian Non-Fiction.

In 1999, she came into possession of copies of convicted murderer Karla Homolka's application to transfer to the Maison Thérèse-Casgrain, run by the Elizabeth Fry Society, and published the story noting the halfway house's proximity to local schools, hours before the Canadian courts issued a publication ban on the information.

On September 11, 2001, the day al-Qaeda attacked the World Trade Center and the Pentagon, Shephard described going to the airport to fly to New York City, only to find all flights in North America had been ordered to land and no new flights were being allowed to take off. So she and two other Toronto Star reporters drove to New York City, arriving at the Ontario/New York State border shortly before it too was shut down. Covering 9/11 began her career as a national security reporter.

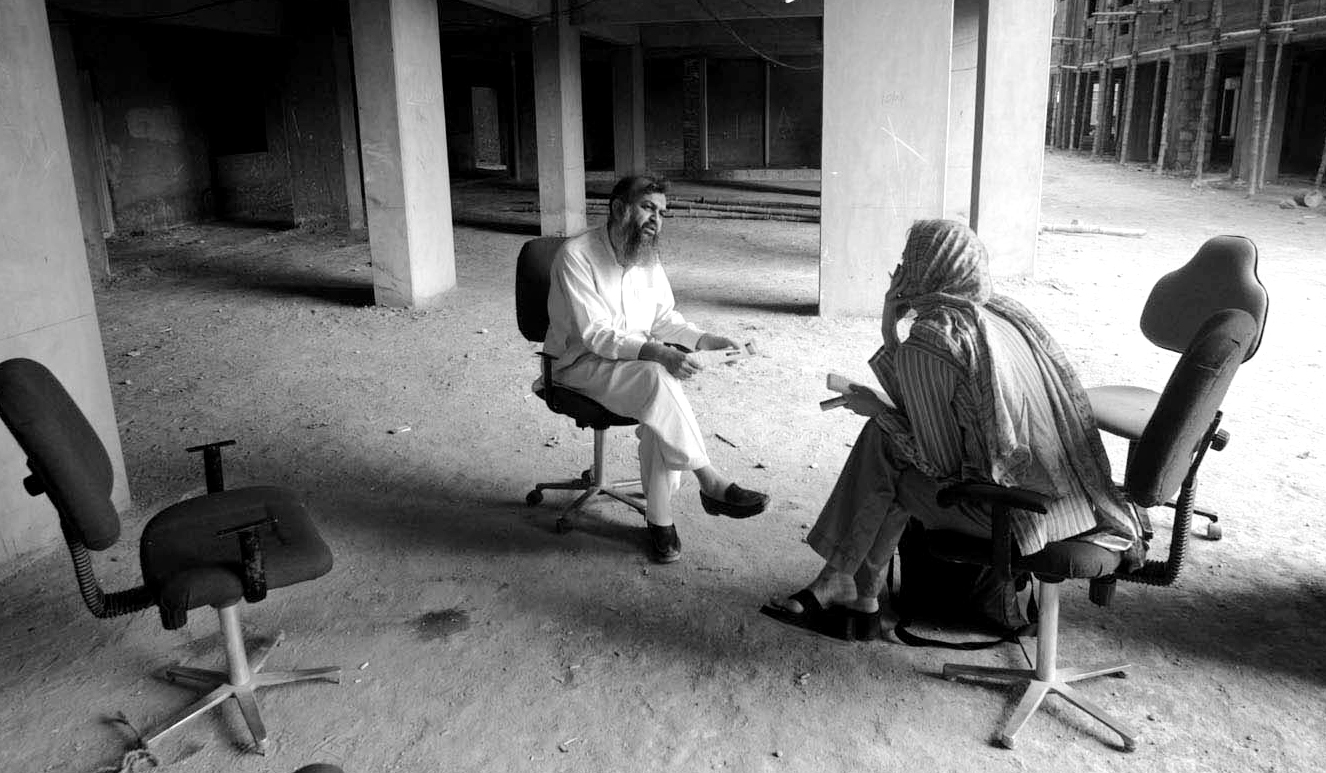
Shephard during an interview with Khalid Khawaja in Karachi, Pakistan.

In 2006, she attended a hostile environment training course in Virginia, in preparation for her overseas reporting. Her foreign reporting from Africa, the Middle East, and Asia has included Somalia, Yemen, Pakistan, Djibouti, Kenya, Syria, and Dubai.

In 2010, she was banned from Guantanamo along with Miami Herald reporter Carol Rosenberg, Globe and Mail's Paul Koring and CanWest reporter Steven Edwards for identifying an interrogator who had been convicted for his role in the death of an Afghan detainee in U.S. detention in Bagram. The Pentagon lifted the ban following an outcry by various news outlets, including the New York Times, and an appeal by the Pentagon Press Association. The Washington Post condemned the Pentagon for trying to exclude four "veteran" reporters with "a depth of knowledge."

In 2019, Shephard hosted Uncover: Sharmini, the fifth season of CBC's crime podcast Uncover.

== Panels ==
In 2004, she co-hosted a Centre of Excellence for Research on Immigration and Settlement panel following up on the Star's series on racial bias in the police force, subtitled "Stagnation, Progress or a Turn in the Wrong Direction?" along with her husband and Scott Simmie. She co-hosted a 2006 round table event with the Canadian Association for Security and Intelligence Studies with other Canadian journalists including Stewart Bell and Colin Freeze entitled "The Media and the Secret World".

In April 2008, she co-hosted a lecture entitled "The Big Idea: The ICC, American Empire and the Search for the Rule of Law" with Erna Paris.

In April 2013, she delivered the Atkinson Lecture on her years as a national security correspondent.

== Awards ==
In June 2015, Shephard was awarded the year-long Atkinson Fellowship in Public Policy. The fellowship lasts a year and awards the fellow a grant of $75,000, and up to an additional $25,000 for research, to pursue a public policy issue of their choice.

== Works ==
- Guantanamo's Child: The Untold Story of Omar Khadr. John Wiley & Sons. February 12, 2010. ISBN 978-0-470-67546-5.
- Decade of Fear: Reporting from Terrorism's Grey Zone. Douglas & McIntyre. August 26, 2011. ISBN 978-1-55365-659-3.
- Uyghurs: Prisoners of the Absurd. National Film Board of Canada, 2014.
- Guantanamo's Child. White Pine Pictures, 2015.
- The Perfect Story. National Film Board of Canada, 2022.
