= DGC Allan King Award for Best Documentary Film =

The DGC Allan King Award for Best Documentary Film is an annual Canadian award, presented by the Directors Guild of Canada to honour the year's best direction in documentary films in Canada. The award was renamed in 2010 to honour influential Canadian documentarian Allan King following his death in 2009. Individual episodes of documentary television series have occasionally been nominated for the award, although nominees and winners are usually theatrical documentary films.

== Winners and nominees ==
=== 2000s ===
Year	Film	Director	Ref
2002
2002	Nuliajuk: Mother of the Sea Beasts	John Houston	
2002	Exhibit A: Secrets of Forensic Science: "Blast"	Harvey Crossland	
2002	Joshua Slocum: Around Alone	Peter Rowe	
2002	Tokyo Girls	Penelope Buitenhuis	
2003
2003	Prisoner of Paradise	Malcolm Clarke	
2003	Death of a Warrior	Manfred Becker	
2003	Mob Stories: "Rocco Perri, King of the Bootleggers"	Mitchell Gabourie	
2003	Samuel Cunard: Bridging the Atlantic	Peter Rowe	
2004
2004	Dying at Grace	Allan King	
2004	The Invisible Machine	Barbara Doran	
2004	Neighbours	Manfred Becker	
2004	The World Stopped Watching	Peter Raymont	
2005
2005	Shake Hands with the Devil: The Journey of Roméo Dallaire	Peter Raymont	
2005	Continuous Journey	Ali Kazimi	
2005	Popcorn with Maple Syrup	Peter Rowe	
2005	The Siege	Manfred Becker	
2006
2006	Turning Points of History: "Hitler's Children"	Manfred Becker	
2006	Ken Leishman: The Flying Bandit	Norma Bailey	
2006	Memory for Max, Claire, Ida and Company	Allan King	
2006	Runaway Grooms	Ali Kazimi	
2007
2007	Sharkwater	Rob Stewart	
2007	EMPz 4 Life	Allan King	
2007	Killer's Paradise	Giselle Portenier	
2007	Recreating Eden	Elise Swerhone	
2008
2008	A Promise to the Dead: The Exile Journey of Ariel Dorfman	Peter Raymont	
2008	Fatherland	Manfred Becker	
2008	Iris Chang: The Rape of Nanking	Bill Spachic	
2008	Triage: Dr. James Orbinski's Humanitarian Dilemma	Patrick Reed	
2009
2009	Air India 182	Sturla Gunnarsson	
2009	James Houston: The Most Interesting Group of People You'll Ever Meet	John Houston	
2009	Malls R Us	Helene Klodawsky	
2009	Prom Night in Mississippi	Paul Saltzman	

=== 2010s ===
Year	Film	Director	Ref
2010
2010	The Experimental Eskimos	Barry Greenwald	
2010	Ballet High	Elise Swerhone	
2010	Genius Within: The Inner Life of Glenn Gould	Peter Raymont, Michèle Hozer	
2010	Love Letters	Tim Southam	
2011
2011	Force of Nature: The David Suzuki Movie	Sturla Gunnarsson	
2011	The Nature of Things: "One Ocean: The Birth of an Ocean"	Mike Downie	
2011	Paul Quarrington: Life in Music	Bert Kish	
2011	Where Did I Put ... My Memory?	Barbara Doran	
2012
2012	West Wind: The Vision of Tom Thomson	Peter Raymont	
2012	Desert Riders	Vic Sarin	
2012	Peace Out	Charles Wilkinson	
2012	Wiebo's War	David York	
2013
2013	Stories We Tell	Sarah Polley	
2013	Fight Like Soldiers, Die Like Children	Peter Raymont	
2013	Playing a Dangerous Game	John Walker	
2013	Vanishing Point	Stephen A. Smith, Julia Szucs	
2014
2014	Watermark	Jennifer Baichwal, Edward Burtynsky	
2014	Arctic Defenders	John Walker	
2014	Chi	Anne Wheeler	
2014	Secretariat's Jockey: Ron Turcotte	Phil Comeau	
2015
2015	Super Duper Alice Cooper	Reginald Harkema	
2015	Monsoon	Sturla Gunnarsson	
2015	Shameless Propaganda	Robert Lower	
2015	The Boy From Geita	Vic Sarin	
2016
2016	Guantanamo's Child: Omar Khadr	Patrick Reed, Michelle Shephard	
2016	Haida Gwaii: On the Edge of the World	Charles Wilkinson	
2016	Ninth Floor	Mina Shum	
2016	Painted Land: In Search of the Group of Seven	Phyllis Ellis	
2017
2017	All Governments Lie: Truth, Deception and the Spirit of I. F. Stone	Fred Peabody	
2017	The Apology	Tiffany Hsiung	
2017	Gun Runners	Anjali Nayar	
2017	Quebec My Country Mon Pays	John Walker	
2018
2018	Long Time Running	Jennifer Baichwal, Nicholas de Pencier	
2018	Gift	Robin McKenna	
2018	Silas	Anjali Nayar	
2018	Unarmed Verses	Charles Officer	
2018	What Walaa Wants	Christy Garland	
2019
2019	Anthropocene: The Human Epoch	Jennifer Baichwal, Nicholas de Pencier, Edward Burtynsky	
2019	Atautsikut: Leaving None Behind	John Houston	
2019	Killing Patient Zero	Laurie Lynd	
2019	Prey	Matt Gallagher	
2019	The Stone Speakers	Igor Drljaca	

=== 2020s ===
Year	Film	Director	Ref
2020
2020	Inconvenient Indian	Michelle Latimer	
2020	The Bull (El Toro)	Danielle Sturk	
2020	Haida Modern	Charles Wilkinson	
2020	High Wire	Claude Guilmain, Christian Langlois	
2020	This Is Not a Movie	Yung Chang	
2021
2021	Wuhan Wuhan	Yung Chang	
2021	In the Rumbling Belly of Motherland	Brishkay Ahmed	
2021	No Ordinary Man	Chase Joynt, Aisling Chin-Yee	
2021	The Silence (Le Silence)	Renée Blanchar	
2021	Someone Like Me	Sean Horlor, Steve J. Adams	
2021	Stateless	Michèle Stephenson	
2022
2022	Buffy Sainte-Marie: Carry It On	Madison Thomas	
2022	Cliff: A Portrait of an Artist	Adam Brooks	
2022	Don't Come Searching	Andrew Moir	
2022	Framing Agnes	Chase Joynt	
2022	Handle With Care: The Legend of the Notic Streetball Crew	Jeremy Schaulin-Rioux	
2022	Unloved: Huronia's Forgotten Children	Barri Cohen	
2023
2023	To Kill a Tiger	Nisha Pahuja	
2023	Batata	Noura Kevorkian	
2023	Category: Woman	Phyllis Ellis	
2023	Someone Lives Here	Zack Russell	
2023	WaaPaKe	Jules Arita Koostachin	
2024
2024	Swan Song	Chelsea McMullan	
2024	Adrianne and the Castle	Shannon Walsh	
2024	Any Other Way: The Jackie Shane Story	Michael Mabbott, Lucah Rosenberg-Lee	
2024	Disco's Revenge	Omar Majeed, Peter Mishara	
2024	A Quiet Girl	Adrian Wills	
2024	An Unfinished Journey	Aeyliya Husain, Amie Williams	
2025
2025	A Mother Apart	Laurie Townshend	
2025	Endless Cookie	Seth Scriver, Peter Scriver	
2025	Goddess of Slide	Alfonso Maiorana	
2025	King Arthur's Night	John Bolton	
2025	The Stand	Christopher Auchter	
2026
2026	The Pink Pill: Sex, Drugs and Who Has Control	Aisling Chin-Yee	
2026	Beautiful	Phyllis Ellis	
2026	Lunatic: The Luna Vachon Story	Kate Kroll	
2026	Nuisance Bear	Jack Weisman, Gabriela Osio Vanden	
2026	There Are No Words	Min Sook Lee	
