= Levelfilm =

Canadian Film Distribution Company

levelFILM, Inc.
- Type: Private
- Industry: Film distribution
- Founded: 2013
- Headquarters: (formerly) 11 Davies Ave, Toronto, Ontario, Canada
- Area served: Worldwide
- Products: Motion Pictures
- Services: Film distribution
- Number of employees: N/A (June 2025)
- Website: level.film

Levelfilm, stylized as levelFILM, was a Canadian film distribution company based in Toronto, Ontario. The company was founded by David Hudakoc and Michael Baker in 2013, and later acquired two other Canadian distribution houses: Search Engine Films in 2018 and KinoSmith in 2021. The company formally ceased operations in June of 2025, with rights for licensed titles reverting to their creators. It released more than 200 titles, with a focus on independent Canadian films.

== History ==
levelFILM was founded by Michael Baker and David Hudakoc in August 2013, who had previously worked together at the U.S. distribution house ThinkFilm. The company's first acquisition, Chen Kaige's Caught in the Web, was announced along with the company's creation.

In 2017, the company sold a majority stake to Laurie Venning, a Canadian investor, entrepreneur, and producer.

At the 2018 Berlin Film Festival levelFILM announced its acquisition of another Canadian distributor, Search Engine Films (SEF). John Bain, the head of SEF at the time, joined as the company's new Head of Distribution. SEF's library was folded into levelFILM's existing catalogue, including titles such as Equals, Kilo Two Bravo, and Mary Shelley.

In 2019, it was announced that levelFILM and U.S.-based distributor Good Deed Entertainment had struck a four-year output deal, ending in 2023.

At the 2021 Toronto International Film Festival levelFILM announced a multi-year output deal with the U.S. company Greenwich Entertainment, beginning with The Capote Tapes. Later in the fall, levelFILM acquired KinoSmith, and folded in its CEO, Robin Smith, as the new Head of Factual. Simultaneously, the company partnered with Smith's other venture, the documentary financing and distribution house Blue Ice Docs, a subsidiary of the Blue Ice Group.

In April 2022 the company was listed at number 9 in The Globe and Mail's list of the 22 most influential people in the Canadian film industry.

During the 2022 Toronto International Film Festival levelFILM signed an exclusive output deal with Bleecker Street. Mafia Mamma, directed by Catherine Hardwicke, is set to be the first release of the deal and is scheduled for April 2023.

In October 2022, levelFILM released Eternal Spring, which was selected to be Canada's official submission to the 95th Academy Awards for the Best International Feature Film category. The film was also eligible for Best Documentary and Best Animated Feature, but did not make the shortlist in either category.

While Level had made it known that the company would be shutting down nearly a year earlier, it formally ceased operations in June of 2025. The stated reason was, "“market realities beyond [its] control,” such as streaming, the recession and industry consolidation putting pressure on smaller distributors."

== Released films ==
List of films released by levelFILM
| Year | Canadian Release Date | Title | Director | Genre |
|---|---|---|---|---|
| 2014 | April 11, 2014 | That Burning Feeling | Jason James | Comedy, Romance |
| 2014 | May 30, 2014 | Hotel Congress | Michel Kandisky, Nadia Litz | Romance, Comedy |
| 2014 | July 18, 2014 | Lawrence & Holloman | Matthew Kowalchuk | Comedy, Drama |
| 2014 | November 21, 2014 | Rosewater | Jon Stewart | Drama, Thriller |
| 2015 | March 6, 2015 | Two Men in Town | Rachid Bouchareb | Comedy, Drama |
| 2015 | April 17, 2015 | Sunshine on Leith | Dexter Fletcher | Musical, Drama |
| 2015 | May 5, 2015 | Soul Boys of the Western World | George Hencken | Documentary, Music |
| 2015 | May 15, 2015 | Wet Bum | Lindsay Mackay | Drama, Kids & Family |
| 2015 | August 21, 2015 | Bang Bang Baby | Jeffrey St. Jules | Sci-fi, Romance |
| 2015 | August 18, 2015 | Learning to Drive | Isabel Coixet | Comedy, Drama |
| 2015 | September 4, 2015 | Before We Go | Chris Evans | Drama, Romance |
| 2015 | November 13, 2015 | Kilo Two Bravo | Paul Katis | War, Thriller |
| 2015 | December 4, 2015 | I Smile Back | Adam Salky | Drama |
| 2015 | December 11, 2015 | People Places Things | Jim Strouse | Comedy, Romance |
| 2016 | January 8, 2016 | The Liberator | Alberto Arvelo | Drama, War |
| 2016 | March 15, 2016 | Glassland | Gerard Barrett | Drama, Thriller |
| 2016 | March 18, 2016 | Coconut Hero | Florian Cossen | Comedy, Drama |
| 2016 | July 15, 2016 | Equals | Drake Doremus | Romance, Sci-fi |
| 2016 | August 19, 2016 | Standing Tall | Emmanuelle Bercot | Drama |
| 2016 | September 23, 2016 | The Girl King | Mika Kaurismaki | Drama |
| 2016 | November 4, 2016 | Morris from America | Chad Hartigan | Comedy, Drama |
| 2016 | November 11, 2016 | Jean of the Joneses | Stella Meghie | Comedy, Drama |
| 2016 | November 29, 2016 | Dégradé | Tarzan and Arab Nasser | Drama |
| 2016 | December 6, 2016 | The Great Gilly Hopkins | Stephen Herek | Kids & Family, Comedy |
| 2017 | February 9, 2017 | Urban Hymn | Michael Caton-Jones | Drama, Musical |
| 2017 | May 9, 2017 | Sled Dogs | Fern Levitt | Documentary |
| 2017 | May 19, 2017 | Alone in Berlin | Vincent Perez | Drama, War |
| 2017 | August 25, 2017 | Bushwick | Cary Murnion, Jonathan Milott | Action, Adventure |
| 2017 | September 22, 2017 | Don't Talk to Irene | Pat Mills | Comedy, Drama |
| 2017 | December 1, 2017 | Wexford Plaza | Joyce Wong | Comedy, Drama |
| 2017 | December 1, 2017 | Suck It Up | Jordan Canning | Comedy, Drama |
| 2018 | January 12, 2018 | Never Steady, Never Still | Kathleen Hepburn | Drama |
| 2018 | January 16, 2018 | The Devout | Connor Gaston | Drama, Sci-fi |
| 2018 | March 16, 2018 | I Can Only Imagine | Andrew Erwin, Jon Erwin | Drama |
| 2018 | March 30, 2018 | Journey's End | Saul Dibb | War, Drama |
| 2018 | June 22, 2018 | Hearts Beat Loud | Brett Haley | Music, Drama |
| 2018 | June 22, 2018 | Octavio Is Dead! | Sook-Yin Lee | Drama, Thriller |
| 2018 | July 6, 2018 | 22 Chaser | Rafal Sokolowski | Drama, Action |
| 2018 | July 13, 2018 | Mary Shelley | Haifaa Al-Mansour | Drama, Romance |
| 2018 | August 24, 2018 | Madeline's Madeline | Josephine Decker | Drama |
| 2018 | September 4, 2018 | The Night Eats the World | Dominique Rocher | Thriller |
| 2018 | October 5, 2018 | Transformer | Michael Del Monte | Documentary |
| 2018 | October 16, 2018 | After Everything | Hannah Marks, Joey Power | Drama, Romance |
| 2018 | November 30, 2018 | Dead in a Week (or Your Money Back) | Tom Edmunds | Thriller, Comedy |
| 2018 | December 14, 2018 | Blaze | Ethan Hawke | Drama, Music |
| 2019 | January 15, 2019 | The Bookshop | Isabel Coixet | Drama |
| 2019 | February 26, 2019 | Salt and Fire | Werner Herzog | Thriller, Drama |
| 2019 | March 15, 2019 | To Dust | Shawn Snyder | Comedy |
| 2019 | March 29, 2019 | Firecrackers | Jasmin Mozaffari | Drama |
| 2019 | May 3, 2019 | Tell It to the Bees | Annabel Jankel | Romance, Drama |
| 2019 | May 7, 2019 | Maze | Stephen Burke | Adventure, Action, History |
| 2019 | May 24, 2019 | I'm Going to Break Your Heart | Jim Morrison, Annie Bradley | Documentary, Music |
| 2019 | June 7, 2019 | Mouthpiece | Patricia Rozema | Drama, Comedy |
| 2019 | July 2, 2019 | Storm Boy | Shawn Seet | Kids &Family, Adventure, Drama |
| 2019 | July 5, 2019 | The Last Black Man in San Francisco | Joe Talbot | Drama, Adventure |
| 2019 | July 23, 2019 | The Delinquent Season | Mark O'Rowe | Romance, Drama |
| 2019 | August 23, 2019 | Angelique's Isle | Michelle Derosier, Marie-Hélène Cousineau | Drama, History |
| 2019 | August 23, 2019 | The Peanut Butter Falcon | Tyler Nilson, Michael Schwartz | Adventure, Comedy, Drama |
| 2019 | September 13, 2019 | Riot Girls | Jovanka Vuckovic | Action, Sci-Fi, Drama |
| 2019 | November 1, 2019 | The Body Remembers When the World Broke Open | Kathleen Hepburn, Elle-Máijá Tailfeathers | Drama |
| 2019 | December 6, 2019 | Brotherhood | Richard Bell | Drama, History |
| 2020 | January 17, 2020 | Les Misérables | Ladj Ly | Drama, Action |
| 2020 | February 7, 2020 | The Assistant | Kitty Green | Drama |
| 2020 | February 21, 2020 | Ordinary Love | Lisa Barros D'Sa, Glenn Leyburn | Drama, Romance |
| 2020 | February 28, 2020 | The Jesus Rolls | John Turturro | Comedy, Action |
| 2020 | March 13, 2020 | Hope Gap | William Nicholson | Drama |
| 2020 | March 20, 2020 | The Rest of Us | Aisling Chin-Yee | Drama, Comedt |
| 2020 | April 17, 2020 | White Lie | Yonah Lewis, Calvin Thomas | Drama |
| 2020 | May 8, 2020 | Fisherman's Friends | Chris Foggin | Comedy, Drama, Music |
| 2020 | May 19, 2020 | The Roads Not Taken | Sally Potter | Drama |
| 2020 | May 22, 2020 | Military Wives | Peter Cattaneo | Music, Drama, Comedy |
| 2020 | June 5, 2020 | 2040 | Damon Gameau | Documentary |
| 2020 | June 16, 2020 | You Don't Nomi | Jeffrey McHale | Documentary |
| 2020 | July 31, 2020 | Summerland | Jessica Swale | Drama, War |
| 2020 | September 4, 2020 | Feels Good Man | Arthur Jones | Documentary |
| 2020 | September 18, 2020 | Blackbird | Roger Michell | Drama |
| 2020 | September 18, 2020 | Nadia, Butterfly | Pascal Plante | Drama, Sports |
| 2020 | October 2, 2020 | The Glorias | Julie Taymor | Drama, History |
| 2020 | November 6, 2020 | The Kid Detective | Evan Morgan | Drama, Comedy, Thriller |
| 2021 | March 3, 2021 | The World to Come | Mona Fastvold | Drama, Romance |
| 2021 | March 8, 2021 | Underplayed | Stacey Lee | Documentary |
| 2021 | March 9, 2021 | Jump, Darling | Phil Connell | Drama |
| 2021 | April 2, 2021 | No Ordinary Man | Aisling Chin-Yee, Chase Joynt | Documentary |
| 2021 | April 6, 2021 | Sugar Daddy | Wendy Morgan | Drama, Music |
| 2021 | May 4, 2021 | I Am Syd Stone | Denis Theriault | Drama |
| 2021 | May 7, 2021 | Street Gang: How We Got to Sesame Street | Marilyn Agrelo | Documentary |
| 2021 | May 11, 2021 | Together Together | Nikole Beckwith | Comedy, Drama |
| 2021 | June 15, 2021 | Akilla's Escape | Charles Officer | Thriller, Drama |
| 2021 | August 13, 2021 | Naked Singularity | Chase Palmer | Thriller, Action, Drama |
| 2021 | October 21, 2021 | Sin La Habana | Kaveh Nabatian | Drama, Romance |
| 2021 | December 3, 2021 | The Souvenir Part II | Joanna Hogg | Drama, Comedy |
| 2022 | January 7, 2022 | See For Me | Randall Okita | Thriller, Horror |
| 2022 | January 28, 2022 | Aline | Valérie Lemercier | Drama, Musical |
| 2022 | February 25, 2022 | Scarborough | Shasha Nakhai, Rich Williamson | Drama |
| 2022 | March 11, 2022 | Donkeyhead | Agam Darshi | Drama, Comedy |
| 2022 | March 18, 2022 | A Small Fortune | Adam Perry | Thriller, Crime, Drama |
| 2022 | March 25, 2022 | Run Woman Run | Zoe Leigh Hopkins | Comedy, Drama |
| 2022 | April 8, 2022 | Night Blooms | Stephanie Joline | Drama |
| 2022 | April 8, 2022 | Sundown | Michel Franco | Drama |
| 2022 | April 15, 2022 | Kicking Blood | Blaine Thurier | Fantasy, Romance, Horror |
| 2022 | April 29, 2022 | Quickening | Haya Waseem | Drama |
| 2022 | May 6, 2022 | Stanleyville | Maxwell McCabe-Lokos | Comedy |
| 2022 | May 27, 2022 | The Middle Man | Bent Hamer | Drama, Crime, Comedy |
| 2022 | May 27, 2022 | Benediction | Terence Davies | Drama, Comedy, Romance |
| 2022 | July 1, 2022 | Mr. Malcolm's List | Emma Holly Jones | Romance, Drama, Comedy |
| 2022 | August 12, 2022 | Ainbo: Spirit of the Amazon | Richard Claus, José Zelada | Animated, Kids & Family |
| 2022 | September 23, 2022 | Eternal Spring | Jason Loftus | Documentary, Animated |
| 2022 | October 14, 2022 | Drinkwater | Stephen Campanelli | Comedy |
| 2022 | October 21, 2022 | Drop the Needle | Rob Freeman | Documentary, Music |
| 2022 | November 4, 2022 | The Swearing Jar | Lindsay MacKay | Drama, Romance, Musical |
| 2022 | December 2, 2022 | The Inspection | Elegance Bratton | Drama |
| 2024 | TBA | The Invisibles | Andrew Currie | Science fiction |
