= Silas (film) =

- Directed by: Anjali Nayar; Hawa Essuman
- Produced by: Steven Markovitz; Anjali Nayar
- Starring: Silas Siakor
- Production company: Big World Cinema
- Distributed by: Amazon
- Release date: 16 September 2017 (TIFF)
- Running time: 80 minutes
- Countries: South Africa; Kenya; Canada
- Language: English

Silas is a 2017 documentary film co-directed by Anjali Nayar and Hawa Essuman. The film profiles the life and work of Liberian environmental activist Silas Siakor, focusing on his campaign against illegal logging and government corruption in Liberia. The documentary premiered at the 2017 Toronto International Film Festival in September 2017.

== Synopsis ==
The film follows Silas Siakor, a recipient of the Goldman Environmental Prize, as he documents and exposes illegal logging operations and political corruption that threaten Liberia's natural resources. Using smartphones and community-based reporting, Siakor and his network of activists challenge multinational corporations and powerful political figures to protect the livelihoods of local communities.

== Production ==
The film was a multinational co-production between Big World Cinema (South Africa), Ink & Pepper Productions (Canada), and various partners in Kenya. Co-director Hawa Essuman brought a Kenyan perspective to the project, while Anjali Nayar, a former journalist, focused on the investigative narrative. The production utilized archival footage alongside contemporary cinematography to illustrate the generational struggle for land rights.

== Release ==
Following its debut at TIFF 2017, the film was screened at various international festivals including DOC NYC and the Zanzibar International Film Festival (ZIFF). The global distribution rights were later acquired by Amazon.

== Accolades ==
The film received several international awards and nominations:

- Winner: Best Documentary and Best International Film – Golden Dhow Awards, Zanzibar International Film Festival (ZIFF).
- Winner: William W. Warner Award for Environmental Storytelling.
- Winner: DGC Craft Award for Outstanding Achievement in Documentary.
- Nominated: DGC Allan King Award for Best Documentary Film
