= King Arthur's Night =

2025 Canadian documentary film

- Directed by: John Bolton
- Produced by: John Bolton; Veda Hille; James Long; Joan McNeil; Niall McNeil; Virginia Prasad; Marcus Youssef
- Starring: Niall McNeil; Marcus Youssef; Veda Hille
- Cinematography: Vince Arvidson
- Edited by: Brendan Woollard
- Music by: Veda Hille
- Production company: Opus 59 Films
- Distributed by: Levelfilm; AMI-tv
- Release date: May 7, 2025 (DOXA)
- Running time: 110 minutes
- Country: Canada
- Language: English

King Arthur's Night is a Canadian documentary film, directed by John Bolton and released in 2025. The film documents the production and staging of King Arthur's Night, a stage musical about the legend of King Arthur created by Marcus Youssef and Niall McNeil to highlight actors with Down syndrome.

== Production ==
The original theatrical production premiered at the Luminato arts festival in Toronto in 2017, before being staged at the National Arts Centre in Ottawa two weeks later, and at Vancouver's Neworld Theatre in 2018.

Bolton's film was first announced in 2022.

== Distribution ==
The film premiered on May 7, 2025, at the DOXA Documentary Film Festival, before being distributed as a television broadcast by AMI-tv on June 27.

== Awards ==
The film received a nomination for the DGC Allan King Award for Best Documentary Film at the 2025 Directors Guild of Canada awards.
