= Billy Tipton =

American jazz musician (1914–1989)

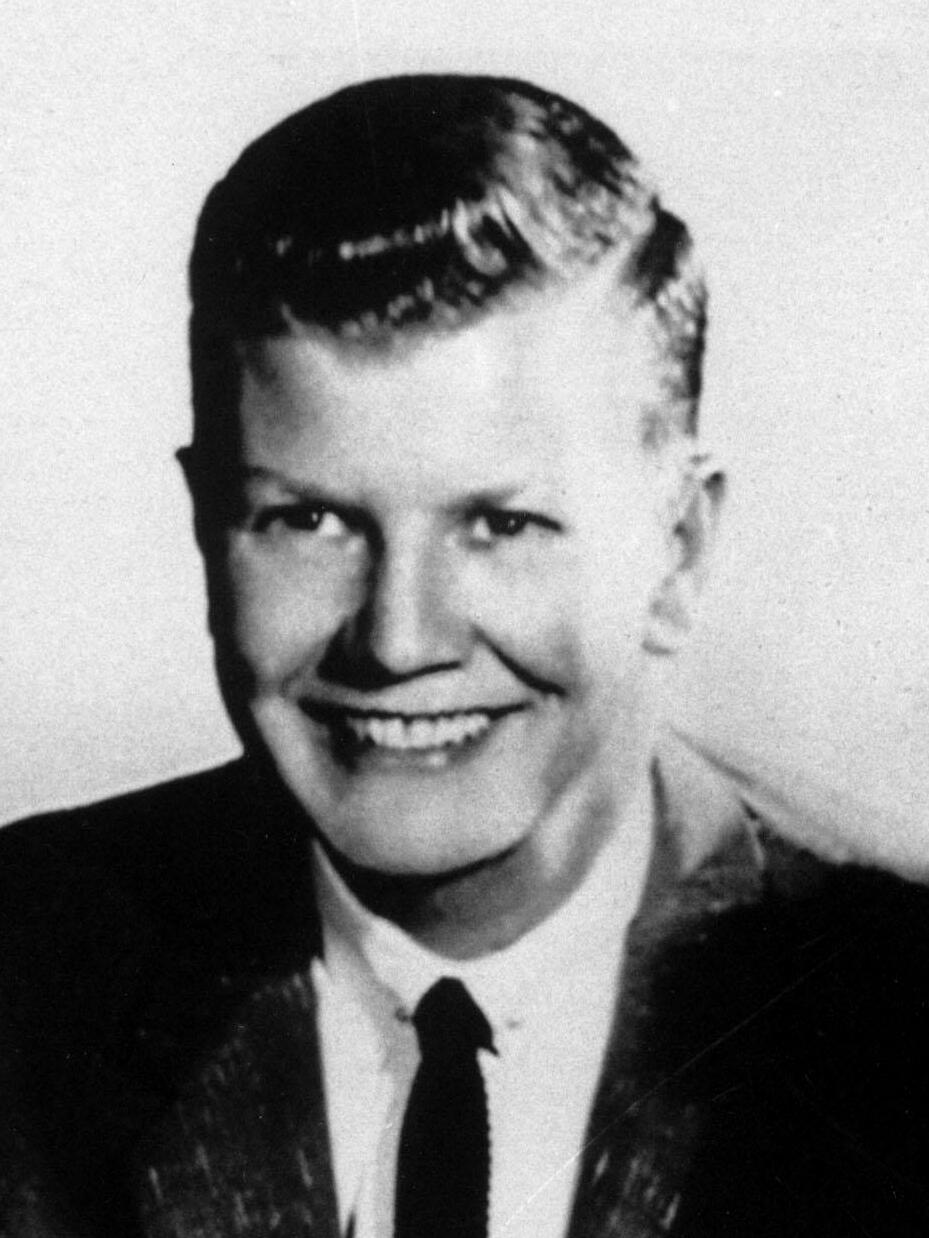
- Tipton, c. 1966

Background information
- Born: December 29, 1914; Oklahoma City, Oklahoma, U.S.
- Died: January 21, 1989 (aged 74) Spokane, Washington, U.S.
- Genres: Jazz, swing
- Occupations: Musician, talent agent
- Instruments: Piano, saxophone
- Years active: 1936–late 1970s
- Label: Tops

Billy Lee Tipton (December 29, 1914 – January 21, 1989) was an American jazz musician, bandleader, and talent broker. He is notable for having been posthumously outed as a transgender man.

Tipton's music career began in the mid-1930s when he led a band for radio broadcasts. He played in various dance bands in the 1940s and recorded two trio albums for a small record label in the mid-1950s. Thereafter, he worked as a talent broker. He stopped performing in the late 1970s due to arthritis.

Tipton lived and identified as male for most of his adult life. After his death in 1989, paramedics discovered he was assigned female at birth, to the surprise of his friends and family. Tabloids and national newspapers picked up the story, scandalously reporting that "he was a she".

Tipton is considered a prominent figure in transgender history in the United States. His story inspired various fictional retellings, including the 1998 novel Trumpet, and a 2020 documentary film, No Ordinary Man.

== Early life ==
Tipton was born in Oklahoma City on December 29, 1914. He grew up in Kansas City, Missouri, where he was raised by an aunt after his parents divorced when he was four years old. As a high school student, Tipton went by the nickname "Tippy" and became interested in music (especially jazz), playing piano and saxophone. Tipton was not allowed to join the all-male school band at Southwest High School. He returned to Oklahoma for his final year of high school and joined the school band at Connors State College High School.

Around 1933, Tipton started binding his chest and presenting traditionally masculine traits. As Tipton began a more serious music career, he "decided to permanently take on the role of a male musician", adopting the name Billy Lee Tipton. By 1940, Tipton was living as a man in his private life as well.

== Career ==
=== Early work ===
In 1936, Tipton was the leader of a band playing on KFXR radio. In 1938, Tipton joined Louvenie's Western Swingbillies, a band that played on radio station KTOK and had a steady gig at Brown's Tavern. In 1940 he was touring the Midwest playing at dances with Scott Cameron's band. In 1941 he began a two-and-a-half-year run performing at the Joplin, Missouri, Cotton Club with George Meyer's band before touring with the Ross Carlyle Band for a while. He then performed songs in Texas for two years.

In 1949, Tipton began touring the Pacific Northwest with Meyer. While this tour was far from glamorous, the band's appearances at Roseburg, Oregon's Shalimar Room were recorded by a local radio station, and so recordings exist of his work during this time, including "If I Knew Then" and "Sophisticated Swing". The trio's signature song was "Flying Home", performed in a close imitation of pianist Teddy Wilson and Benny Goodman's band.

As George Meyer's band became more successful, they began getting more work, performing at the Boulevard Club in Coeur d'Alene, Idaho, sharing the bill with others such as The Ink Spots, the Delta Rhythm Boys, and Billy Eckstine.

=== Bandleader ===
Tipton began playing piano alone at the Elks Club in Longview, Washington, in 1951. In Longview, he started the Billy Tipton Trio, which included Dick O'Neil on drums, and Kenny Richards (and later Ron Kilde) on bass. The trio gained local popularity.

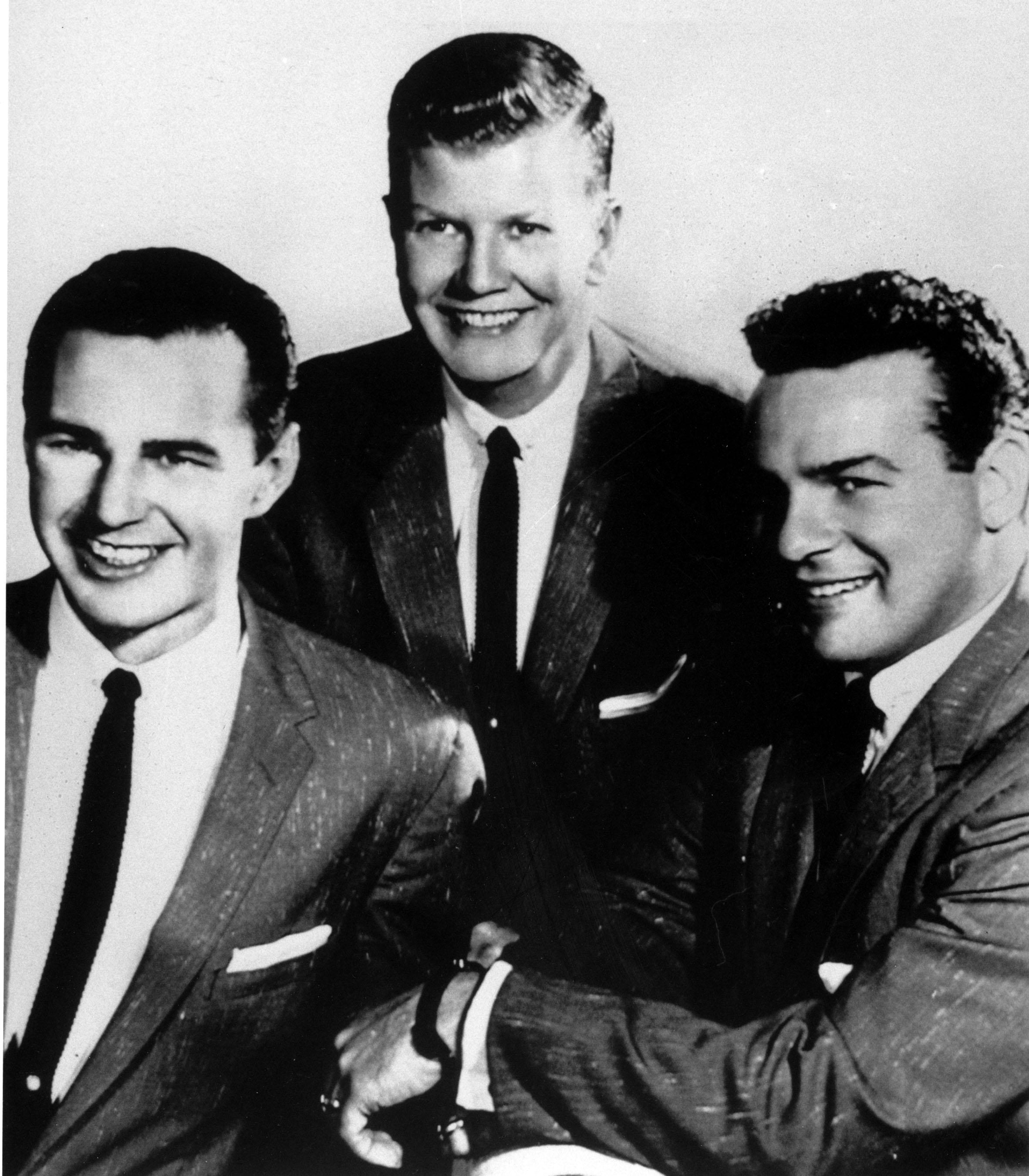
Tipton (center) with the trio

In 1956, while on tour performing at King's Supper Club in Santa Barbara, California, a talent scout from Tops Records heard them play and got them a contract. The Billy Tipton Trio recorded two albums of jazz standards for Tops: Sweet Georgia Brown and Billy Tipton Plays Hi-Fi on Piano, both released early in 1957. Among the pieces performed were "Can't Help Lovin' Dat Man", "Willow Weep for Me", "What'll I Do", and "Don't Blame Me". In 1957, the albums sold 17,678 copies, a "respectable" sum for a small independent record label.

In 1958, after the success of both albums, the Billy Tipton Trio was offered a position as house band at the Holiday Hotel casino in Reno, Nevada, as well as opening for fellow musician Liberace. Tops Records also invited the trio to record four more albums. Tipton declined both offers, choosing instead to move to Spokane, Washington, where he worked as a talent broker and the trio performed weekly.

In the late 1970s, worsening arthritis forced Tipton to retire from his music career.

== Personal life ==
Tipton was never legally married, but five women called themselves "Mrs. Tipton" during his life. In 1934, Tipton began living with a woman named Non Earl Harrell. The relationship ended in 1942. The four women who would later call themselves "Mrs. Tipton" were reportedly unaware of Tipton's assigned sex at birth. Tipton was able to pass as a cisgender man and remained stealth by telling these women that he had been in a serious car crash that resulted in damaged genitals and broken ribs.

Tipton's next relationship, with a singer known only as "June", lasted for several years. For seven years, Tipton lived with Betty Cox, who was 18 or 19 years old when they first met, and eventually became involved. Cox remembered Tipton as "the most fantastic love of my life". In 1954, Tipton's relationship with Cox ended, and he then entered a relationship with a woman named Maryann. The pair moved to Spokane, Washington, in 1958. Maryann later stated that in 1960, she discovered that Tipton had become involved with a nightclub dancer named Kathleen "Kitty" Kelly.

Tipton and Kelly settled down together in 1961. They adopted three sons, John, Scott, and William; the adoptions were not legally recognised. After they separated around 1977, Tipton resumed a relationship with Maryann. Maryann reportedly discovered Tipton's birth certificate and asked Tipton about it once, but was given no reply other than a "terrible look".

== Death, post-mortem outing, and aftermath ==
In 1989, Tipton had symptoms which he attributed to the emphysema he had contracted from heavy smoking and refused to call a doctor. He was actually suffering from a hemorrhaging peptic ulcer which, left untreated, was fatal. On January 21, 1989, his son William called emergency services. While paramedics were trying to save Tipton's life, they, alongside Tipton's son William, discovered he was assigned female at birth. This information "came as a shock to nearly everyone, including the women who had considered themselves his wives, as well as his sons and the musicians who had traveled with him". Later, following financial offers from the media, Kelly and one of their sons went public with the story. The first newspaper article was published the day after Tipton's funeral and it was quickly picked up by wire services. Stories about him appeared in a variety of papers, including tabloids such as National Enquirer and Star as well as People, The New York Times and The Seattle Times. Members of Tipton's family made talk show appearances as well.

Tipton left wills: one handwritten and not notarized that left everything to William Jr.; and the second, notarized, leaving everything to John Clark, the first child the Tiptons adopted. A court upheld the first will, and William inherited almost everything, with John and Scott receiving one dollar each. According to a 2009 episode of the documentary program The Will: Family Secrets Revealed, which featured interviews with all three sons, it was revealed that a final court judgment awarded all three sons an equal share of his wife Kitty Tipton's estate (not Billy Tipton's), which, after lawyers' fees, amounted to $35,000 for each son. Two of his adopted sons changed their names not long after learning of Tipton's assigned gender, as they didn't want to be associated with their father's name anymore.

== Works inspired by Tipton ==
- Stevie Wants to Play the Blues was a play based on Tipton's life written by Eduardo Machado and performed in Los Angeles, directed by Simon Callow and starring Amy Madigan and Paula Kelly.
- "The Legend of Billy Tipton", by the punk band The Video Dead, is about the story of Billy Tipton.
- Soita minulle Billy (Call me Billy), a Finnish play with Joanna Haartti playing Tipton, presented at Theatre Jurka in 2011 and again at the 2012 Helsinki Festival.
- The Slow Drag (1996), by Carson Kreitzer, a "jazz cabaret" with a live band onstage featuring the character, Johnny Christmas, based on Tipton.
- Trumpet, a 1998 novel by Jackie Kay, tells the story of fictional Scottish jazz musician Joss Moody, inspired by Tipton.
- The Tiptons Sax Quartet, previously known as The Billy Tipton Memorial Saxophone Quartet, is a jazz saxophone quartet from Seattle, Washington. The name of the quartet was inspired by Tipton.
- A cabaret musical called A Girl Named Bill, starring Nellie McKay, tells the story of Tipton.
- No Ordinary Man, a documentary film about Tipton by Aisling Chin-Yee and Chase Joynt, premiered at the 2020 Toronto International Film Festival.

== Discography ==
- Sweet Georgia Brown (LP). Billy Tipton Trio. Los Angeles: Tops Records. 1957. OCLC 55858361. L1522.
- Hi-Fi on Piano (LP). New York: Tops Records. 1957. OCLC 15877358. L1534.
