= Aisling Chin-Yee =

Canadian film producer, director, and writer

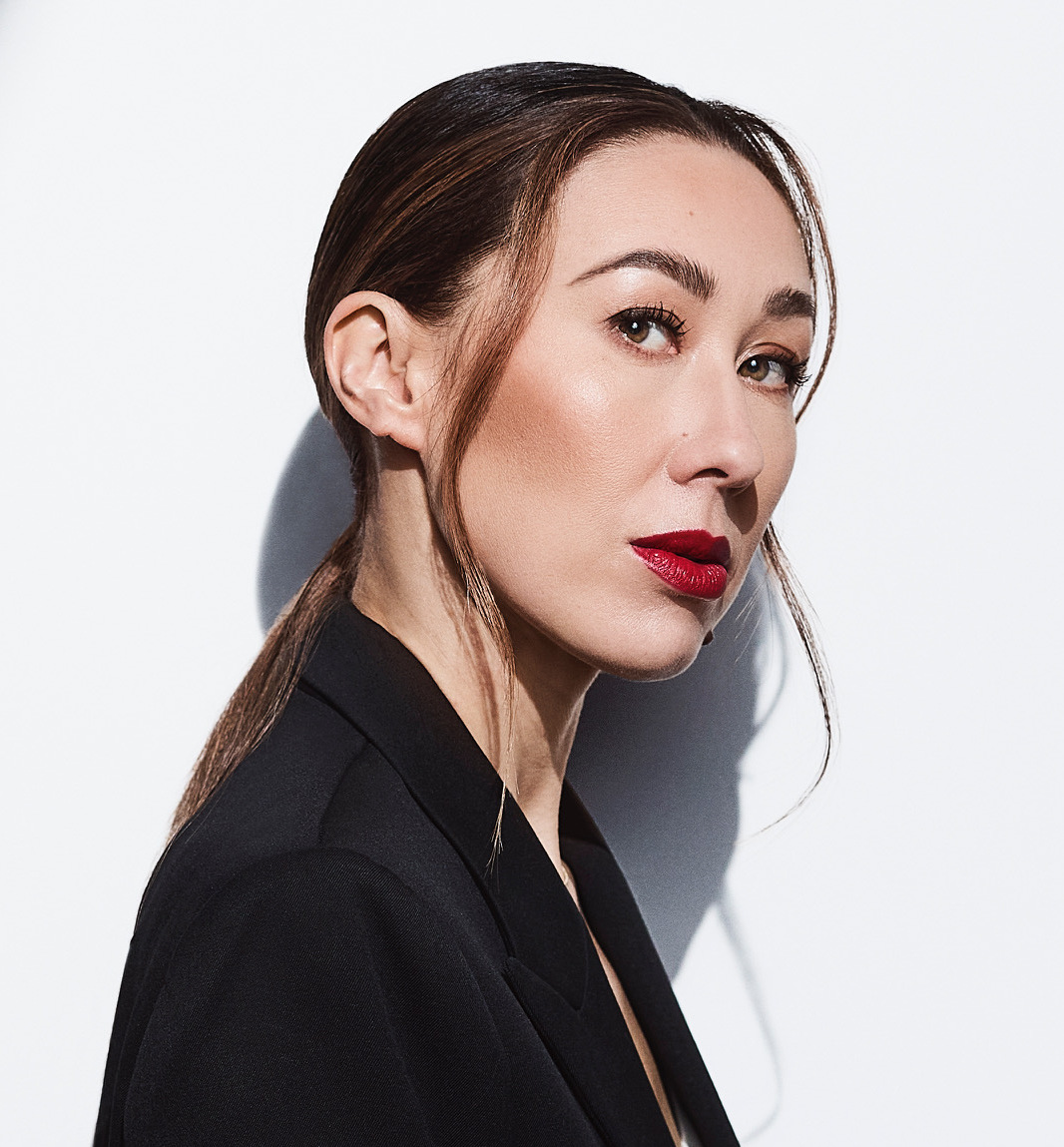
- Chin-Yee in 2021
- Born: Halifax, Nova Scotia, Canada
- Other name: Ash Chin-Yee
- Occupations: Producer; director; writer
- Years active: 2008–present

Aisling Chin-Yee is a Canadian film director, writer, and producer, who works primarily in Montreal and Los Angeles. In addition to her work as a producer, Chin-Yee directed the films The Rest of Us (2019), No Ordinary Man (2020) and The Pink Pill: Sex, Drugs and Who Has Control (2025). In 2026, she was named one of Canada's Most Powerful Women in Entertainment by The Hollywood Reporter.

== Early life and education ==
Chin-Yee was born in Halifax, Nova Scotia. In 2004, Chin-Yee graduated from Concordia University with a degree in communication studies and a minor in film studies, concentrated in film production, theory, and analysis.

== Career ==
In 2006, Chin-Yee started her career as associate producer at the National Film Board of Canada. In 2010, she joined Prospector Films as producer.

Her short film, Sound Asleep (2014), premiered at Lucerne International Film Festival. In 2015, her documentary film, Synesthesia, won best short documentary at the Crossroads Film Festival. she co-created the #AfterMeToo movement in 2017 along with Mia Kirshner and Freya Ravensbergen that consisted of a symposium, a report, and fund in partnership with the Canadian Women's Foundation.

Chin-Yee's directorial debut feature film, The Rest of Us, starring Heather Graham, Sophie Nélisse and Jodi Balfour, premiered at the Toronto International Film Festival. She was nominated for best feature film editing by the Canadian Cinema Editors in 2020. In 2020, she co-directed the documentary feature film about Billy Tipton, No Ordinary Man, with Chase Joynt, which premiered at the Toronto International Film Festival. In 2023, she directed three episodes of the CBC Television series, Plan B. She served as executive producer on Plan B's second season. In 2021, she was named to DOC NYC and HBO Documentary's annual 40 Under 40 list. No Ordinary Man was named one of TIFF's Top Ten films and selected by The New Yorker as one of the Best Movies of 2021.

== Personal life ==
Chin-Yee was for some time in the 2010s the romantic partner of the late filmmaker Jean-Marc Vallée, who died of arrhythmia on December 25, 2021. They met in 2015 at the Canadian Governor General's Awards for the Performing Arts.

== Filmography ==
Year	Title	Writer	Director	Producer	Note
2008	Three Mothers			✓	Short film
2012	Sorry, Rabbi			✓	Short film
2013	Last Woman Standing			✓	Short film
2013	Rhymes for Young Ghouls			✓	Feature film
2014	Sound Asleep	✓	✓	✓	Short film
2015	The Saver			✓	Feature film
2016	Inside These Walls			✓	Documentary
2017	Synesthesia	✓	✓	✓	Documentary
2017	Lost Generation			✓	9 episodes
2019	The Rest of Us		✓		Feature film; also editor
2020	No Ordinary Man	✓	✓		Documentary; co-director with Chase Joynt
2023	Plan B (Season 1)		✓		3 episodes
2024	Plan B (Season 2)			✓	6 episodes
2025	The Pink Pill: Sex, Drugs and Who Has Control	✓	✓	✓	Documentary

== Awards and nominations ==
Year	Result	Award	Category	Work	Ref.
2019	Nominated	Toronto International Film Festival	Best Canadian Feature	The Rest of Us	
2020	Nominated	Toronto International Film Festival	Best Canadian Feature	No Ordinary Man	
2020	Won	Inside Out Film and Video Festival	Best Canadian Feature	No Ordinary Man	
2020	Won	Montreal International Documentary Festival	Best Feature	No Ordinary Man	
2020	Nominated	Philadelphia Film Festival	Best Documentary Feature	No Ordinary Man	
2020	Nominated	Canadian Cinema Editors	Best Editing in Feature Film	The Rest of Us	
2021	Won	Cleveland International Film Festival	Best Documentary	No Ordinary Man	
2021	Won	Reelout Queer Film Festival	Best Canadian Film	No Ordinary Man	
2021	Won	Directors Guild of Canada	Best Picture Editing - Documentary	No Ordinary Man	
2021	Nominated	Directors Guild of Canada	Excellence in Documentary	No Ordinary Man	
2023	Won	Directors Guild of Canada	Outstanding Directorial Achievement in Movies for Television or Mini-Series	Plan B : Episode 5	
2025	Won	Doc NYC	Audience Award	The Pink Pill: Sex, Drugs and Who Has Control	
2026	Won	Directors Guild of Canada	Allan King Award for Best Documentary Film	The Pink Pill: Sex, Drugs and Who Has Control	
