= Light of My Life (film) =

2019 American drama film

- Theatrical release poster
- Directed by: Casey Affleck
- Written by: Casey Affleck
- Produced by: Teddy Schwarzman; Casey Affleck; John Powers Middleton
- Starring: Casey Affleck; Anna Pniowsky; Tom Bower; Elisabeth Moss
- Cinematography: Adam Arkapaw
- Edited by: Dody Dorn; Christopher Tellefsen
- Music by: Daniel Hart
- Production companies: Black Bear Pictures; Company A
- Distributed by: Saban Films
- Release dates: February 8, 2019 (Berlinale); August 9, 2019 (United States)
- Running time: 119 minutes
- Country: United States
- Language: English
- Box office: $1.4 million

Light of My Life is a 2019 American post-apocalyptic drama film written and directed by Casey Affleck. The film stars Affleck, Anna Pniowsky, Tom Bower, and Elisabeth Moss. Affleck portrays a man who must protect his daughter by disguising her as his son after a plague wipes out most of the female population.

Light of My Life had its world premiere at the Berlin International Film Festival on February 8, 2019, and was released in the United States by Saban Films on August 9, 2019.

== Plot ==
Almost a decade after a mysterious pandemic wiped out most of the female population, Dad and his daughter Rag journey through British Columbia. Rag is one of the very few females of the human species left on Earth. Dad must protect her by disguising her as his son from male bandits who are looking for any female human. In a flashback, before Mom dies, Dad promises to her that he will tell their daughter everything about Mom.

After leaving the woods where they first camped, the two take shelter in an abandoned house. After staying for a few days, the two narrowly escape from four men breaking in looking for them. The father hitches them a ride and steals the car from the owner to get themselves to his grandparents' home.

Arriving there, they find that the house is now occupied by Tom and his two friends, Calvin and Lemmy. Tom is a religious man and has a friendly approach to Dad and Rag. At night, the two sneak out their belongings into a nearby cabin in case of a "red alert", a term the father uses when dangerous men are approaching. The next morning, Tom teaches Rag how to use a shotgun for self-defense. Tom eventually suspects that the "son" is a daughter and he questions Dad with concern, not wanting Rag to be in the possession of a random male with evil intentions. He tells Dad that he lost nine female relatives in a matter of weeks, eight to the virus and one to "a pack of monsters". Moved by the story, Dad admits that Rag is, indeed, his daughter; he proves it with a photo of the family, explaining that Rag is short for Raggedy Ann, as her name is Anna Elizabeth.

Later, three men arrive, barge into the house and kill Tom and Lemmy (Calvin apparently tipped off the intruders). Rag and Dad hide in the attic and he manages to drop her out of the window. He then proceeds to fight and kill the first and then second bandits; however, the last attacker almost strangles him to death. Rag appears and shoots the bandit, killing him but also hitting Dad's side. They go to the cabin, where Rag removes the shot pellet from his wound. While Dad rests, a flashback shows him promising Mom that he will look after Rag. After Rag has treated his wound, he says they will go to the safe place with friendly people that Tom mentioned earlier. As Dad breaks down in tears, Rag comforts him, in the same way Mom did in flashbacks, when Rag was a baby.

== Cast ==
- Anna Pniowsky as Rag
- Casey Affleck as Dad
- Tom Bower as Tom
- Elisabeth Moss as Mom
- Hrothgar Mathews as Calvin
- Timothy Webber as Lemmy

== Production ==
In September 2016, it was announced Casey Affleck would write, direct, and star in the film, while Teddy Schwarzman would produce under his Black Bear Pictures banner. In February 2017, it was announced Anna Pniowsky would star in the film, and Sierra/Affinity would produce the film and handle international sales. In August 2018, it was revealed Elisabeth Moss had joined the cast of the film.

Principal photography began in February 2017 in British Columbia's Okanagan.

Daniel Hart composed the film score. The soundtrack was released at Varèse Sarabande Records on August 16, 2019.

== Release ==
It had its world premiere at the Berlin International Film Festival on February 8, 2019. Shortly after, Saban Films acquired distribution rights to the film. It was released on August 9, 2019.

=== Home Entertainment ===
On October 11, 2019, Paramount Pictures Home Entertainment released Light of My Life on Blu-Ray and DVD.

== Reception ==
=== Box office ===
Light of My Life grossed $20,056 in the United States and Canada and $527,105 in other territories.

=== Critical reception ===
On review aggregator Rotten Tomatoes, the film holds an approval rating of 80% based on 56 reviews, with an average of 6.8/10. The website's critical consensus reads, "Its deliberate pace may test the patience, but viewers attuned to Light of My Life's sober wavelength will be rewarded with a thought-provoking chiller." On Metacritic, the film holds a rating of 67 out of 100, based on 16 critics, indicating "generally favorable" reviews.
