= Abigail Pniowsky =

Canadian actress

- Born: January 26, 2008 (age 18); Winnipeg, Manitoba
- Occupation: Actress
- Years active: 2014–present

Abigail Pniowsky (born January 26, 2008) is a Canadian actress. She played Lily Painter in the horror series Channel Zero and Lake Sadler-Greene in the drama series Ten Days in the Valley.

== Early life ==
Pniowsky was born in Winnipeg, Canada. Her older sister Anna is also an actress.

== Career ==
She gained nationwide recognition for playing Hannah in the sci-fi drama film Arrival starring Amy Adams. Her performance was praised by her fellow actors. Her first big role came playing Lily Painter and in the horror series Channel Zero. She is best known for playing Lake Sadler-Greene in the drama series Ten Days in the Valley. She played Talulah in the drama comedy film The Rest of Us starring Heather Graham. She played Max in the drama series Me. She played the lead role of Oli in the drama film American Baby.

== Personal life ==
In her spare time she practices MMA, dancing and loves swimming far out in the ocean. She is very interested in science, specifically marine biology.

== Filmography ==
=== Film ===
Year	Title	Role	Notes
2014	The Gabby Douglas Story	Jessica Lonsdale	
2016	Arrival	8 year old Hannah	
2016	Wait Till Helen Comes	Helen	
2016	The Midnight Man	Young Kelly	
2018	He's Out There	Maddie	
2019	The Rest of Us	Talulah	
2025	American Baby	Oli	

=== Television ===
Year	Title	Role	Notes
2016-2017	Channel Zero	Lily Painter, Margot	10 episodes
2017	Ten Days in the Valley	Lake Sadler-Greene	10 episodes
2024	Me	Max	10 episodes
