= Anna Pniowsky =

Canadian actress

- Born: September 4, 2006 (age 18); Winnipeg, Manitoba, Canada
- Occupation: Actor

Anna Pniowsky (born September 4, 2006) is a Canadian actress.

== Life ==
Anna Pniowsky was born in Winnipeg in 2006 as the daughter of Jeff and Tracey Pniowsky.

After a first leading role alongside her younger sister Abigail Pniowsky in the horror thriller "He's Out There" by Quinn Lasher, she starred in "Light of My Life" with Casey Affleck, which premiered in February 2019 at the Berlin International Film Festival, portraying his film daughter Rag.

== Filmography ==
- 2018: He's Out There
- 2019: Light of My Life
- 2019: The Hot Zone (TV series, 4 episodes)
- 2020: Bad Therapy
- 2019–2020: PEN15 (TV series, 10 episodes)
