= Bad Therapy (film) =

2020 American comedy thriller film by William Teitler

- Official poster
- Directed by: William Teitler
- Written by: Nancy Doyne
- Produced by: William Teitler; Gina Resnick
- Starring: Alicia Silverstone; Rob Corddry; Michaela Watkins
- Cinematography: Rob Givens
- Edited by: David Leonard
- Production company: Varient
- Distributed by: Gravitas Ventures
- Release date: April 17, 2020
- Running time: 97 minutes
- Country: United States
- Language: English

Bad Therapy is a 2020 American comedy thriller film directed by William Teitler from a screenplay by Nancy Doyne, based on the novel Judy Small by Doyne. It's been described as a mixture of thriller, comedy and drama. It stars Alicia Silverstone, Rob Corddry, and Michaela Watkins.

It was released on April 17, 2020, by Gravitas Ventures. Forgoing a theatrical release due to the COVID-19 pandemic, the film was released to on-demand platforms.

== Summary ==
Susan and Bob Howard, a married couple, attend marriage counseling from Judy Small, a manipulative and unhinged therapist.

== Cast ==
- Alicia Silverstone as Susan Howard
- Rob Corddry as Bob Howard
- Michaela Watkins as Judy Small
- Haley Joel Osment as Reed
- Aisha Tyler as Roxy
- Sarah Shahi as Annabelle
- David Paymer as Dr. Edward Kingsley
- Dichen Lachman as Stern
- John Ross Bowie as Nick
- Ginger Gonzaga as Miranda
- Flula Borg as Serge
- Anna Pniowsky as Louise Howard
- Erik Griffin as Principal Sykes
- Gavin Leatherwood as "Spit"

== Production ==
In May 2018, it was announced Sarah Shahi had joined the cast of the film, with William Teitler directing from a screenplay by Nancy Doyne, based upon her novel Judy Small. In July 2018, Alicia Silverstone, Rob Corddry and Michaela Watkins joined the cast of the film. In August 2018, Anna Pniowsky joined the cast of the film.

== Release ==
In March 2020, Gravitas Ventures acquired distribution rights to the film and set it for an April 17, 2020, release.

== Reception ==
As of October 2021, 7% of the 14 reviews compiled by Rotten Tomatoes are positive, and have an average score of 4.4/10.
