= Soul Boy =

2010 Kenyan drama film

- Directed by: Hawa Essuman
- Written by: Billy Kahora
- Produced by: Marie Steinmann; Tom Tykwer; Guy Wilson; Verena Rahmig; Sarika Hemi Lakhani
- Starring: Samson Odhiambo; Leila Dayan Opou; Krysteen Savane; Frank Kimani; Joab Ogolla; Lucy Gachanja; Katherine Damaris; Kevin Onyango Omondi; Calvin Shikuku Odhiambo; Nordeen Abdulghani
- Cinematography: Christian Almesberger
- Edited by: Ng´ethe Gitungo
- Music by: Xaver von Treyer
- Production companies: One Fine Day Films; Anno's Africa; Ginker Ink Films
- Distributed by: X Verleih AG (through Warner Bros.)
- Release dates: January 2010 (Göteborg); 4 March 2010 (Kenya); 2 December 2010 (Germany)
- Running time: 61 minutes
- Countries: Germany; Kenya
- Language: Swahili
- Budget: $16,211

Soul Boy is a 2010 drama film written by Billy Kahora and directed by Hawa Essuman. It developed under the mentorship of German director and producer Tom Tykwer in Kibera, one of the largest slums in the African continent, in the middle of Nairobi, Kenya. The film has received five nominations at the 2011 Africa Movie Academy Awards.

The film originated in a workshop for young film enthusiasts from Nairobi, guided by Tykwer.

== Plot ==
The story is about a 14-year-old boy called Abila, who lives in one of the most miserable slums known as Kibera in Nairobi, Kenya. One of the biggest slums in East Africa. One morning the teenager discovers his father was ill and delirious. "Someone has stolen my soul", mumbles the father. Abila is shocked and confused but wanted to help his father and goes in search of the right remedy. Supported by his girlfriend Shiku whom he is not even allowed to have friendship with. Abila learned that his father has gambled his life in company of a witch.

The teenager sets an adventurous journey in the Kibera Slum about to look for the witch, that leads him right through his community. When he finally discovers her, the witch gives him seven challenging tasks to save his father's lost soul.

=== Themes ===
The film explores themes of family, responsibility, and reconciliation, while also addressing issues such as poverty, alcoholism, and tribal divisions in Kenyan society. Its use of magical realism allows it to tackle these subjects through symbolism and allegory, making the story both universal and locally grounded.

=== Production and release ===
Soul Boy was developed through a workshop led by German director Tom Tykwer and produced as a collaboration between Kenyan and German filmmakers. It was filmed on location in Kibera, with many local residents participating in its production. The film premiered in 2010 and was screened at several international film festivals, including the International Film Festival Rotterdam and the Gothenburg Film Festival.

=== Reception ===
The film received positive reviews for its storytelling, performances, and authentic portrayal of life in Kibera. Critics praised Essuman's direction and the film's blending of folklore with contemporary social issues. It went on to win several awards at international festivals, including the Dioraphte Audience Award at the International Film Festival Rotterdam.

== Cast ==
- Samson Odhiambo as Abila
- Leila Dayan Opou as Shiku
- Krysteen Savane as Nyawawa
- Frank Kimani as Macharia
- Joab Ogolla as Abi's Father
- Lucy Gachanja as Abi's Mother
- Katherine Damaris as Aunt Susan
- Kevin Onyango Omondi as Bojo
- Calvin Shikuku Odhiambo as Kaka
- Nordeen Abdulghani as Willie
- Ginger Wilson as Claire
- Nick Reding as Brian
- John Githui as Matatu Tout
- Tony Rimwa as Mr. Kamangu
- McLean Wilson as Amy
- Jomo Wilson as Rafael
- Godfrey Ojiambo - Thief
- Rogers Otieno - Angry Man
- Tony Rimwa as Mr. Kamangu
- Juma Williams as S.A.F.E. Stage Father
- Sharleen Njeri as S.A.F.E. Stage Mother
- Micheal Babu as Kama
- Paul Njogu as Kimani
- Lydia Makori as Bibi Okello
- Aida Mulafu as Mama Wekesa
- Rose Adhiambo as Mama Akinyi
- Consolata Apondias the Weaver Woman
- Gilbert K. Lukalia as the Gatekeeper
- Jones Onyango Ajwala as the Old Couple - Man
- Clementina Makokha as the Old Couple - Woman
- Christopher Abuga as the Auctioneer
- Alex Jadolo - Thug 2
- Anthony Waweru - Dead Man

== Awards and nominations ==
Year	Awarding Organisation	Category	Nominee	Result	Ref
2010	International Film Festival Rotterdam	Dioraohate Award	Soul Boy	Won	
2010	Carthage Film Festival	Narrative Feature Film	Soul Boy	Nominated	
2011	African Movie Academy Awards	Best Film	Soul Boy	Nominated	
2011	African Movie Academy Awards	Best Director	Hawa Essuman	Nominated	
2011	African Movie Academy Awards	Best Young/Promising Actor	Samson Odhiambo Leila Dayan Opou	Nominated	
2011	African Movie Academy Awards	Best Editing	Ng'ethe Gitungo	Won	
2011	African Movie Academy Awards	Best Screenplay	Soul Boy	Nominated	
2010	Africa International Film Festival	Feature Film Competition	Soul Boy	Won	
2010	Kalasha International Film and TV Awards	Best Lead Actress Film	Leila Dayan Opou	Nominated	
2010	Kalasha International Film and TV Awards	Best Lead Actor Film	Samson Odhiambo	Won	
2010	Kalasha International Film and TV Awards	Best Supporting Actress Film	Krysteen Savane	Nominated	
2010	Kalasha International Film and TV Awards	Best Short Film	Soul Boy	Won	
2010	Kenya International Film Festival	Best Actor	Samson Odhiambo	Won	
2010	Kenya International Film Festival	Best East African Film	Soul Boy	Won	
2010	Zanzibar International Film Festival	Signis Award	Soul Boy	Won	
2010	Afrika Filmfestival Leuven	Veto Award	Soul Boy	Won	
2010	Festival Ciné Junior	Special Mention "Passeurs d’images" prize	Soul Boy	Won	
2010	Festival Ciné Junior	The Young Jury Prize	Soul Boy	Won	
2011	European Spiritual Film Festival	Best Fiction Award	Soul Boy	Won	
2011	Kirchliches Filmfestival Recklinghausen	Best Children's Film Award	Soul Boy	Won	

== Reception ==
=== Critical response ===
Andrew Onyango reviewing for KenyaBuzz was impressed by how much "surreal" the world of the movie is, adding that the scripts use of Swahili strengthened the film's impact: "The Swahili speaking audience (particularly those exposed to the dialect being used) feel a powerful sense of identification. There is nothing like hearing it firsthand because the translation loses some of the impact of the words."
