= Julian Bailey (actor) =

Canadian actor

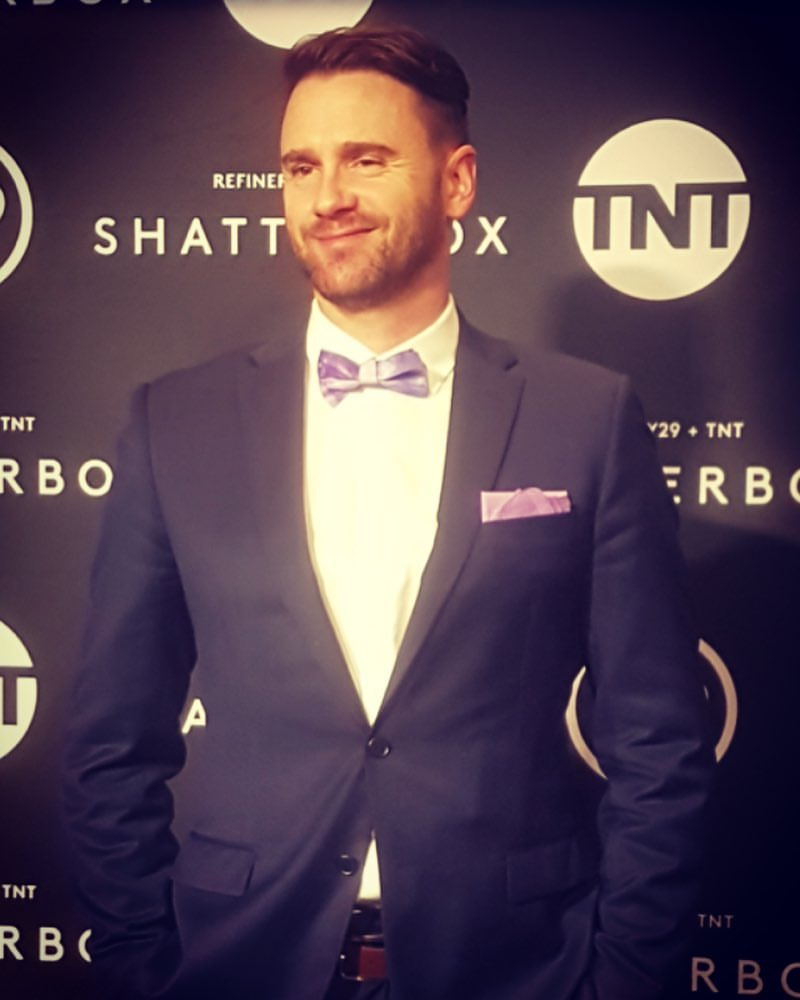
- Bailey in 2018
- Born: May 25, 1977 (age 49); Montreal, Quebec, Canada
- Occupation: Actor
- Years active: 1988–present

Julian Bailey (born May 25, 1977) is a Canadian actor, well known for his roles in feature films, television series, and video games, including NCIS, Supernatural, Rainbow Six: Siege, and Amazon Prime Video's Three Pines.

== Biography ==
Bailey first appeared to American television audiences in 2002 in the recurring role of Scott Wilson, assistant to Lea Thompson, in the Lifetime network drama, For The People. He later portrayed the comedic recurring role of Vincent, the flirtatious bartender from the 'Indigo Club' on the soap opera The Young and the Restless.

Bailey starred in the feature film comedy, Meeting Spencer with Jeffrey Tambor and Jesse Plemons in 2011. In 2018, he played the role of Owen in the horror film He's Out There. In 2021, Bailey was cast as a series regular in the critically acclaimed Amazon Prime Video series, Three Pines, playing the role of Peter Morrow. In the early 1990s, Bailey originated the role of Pepito in the popular Madeline specials by Cinar Films for HBO, narrated by fellow Montreal native, Christopher Plummer. Bailey also did voices for several anime series, including the international classic, Jungle Book Shōnen Mowgli, as Mowgli. Finding notoriety in the worldwide video game market, the actor played the role of Deputy Staci Pratt in Ubisoft's 2018 commercial hit, Far Cry 5. Since 2015, Bailey has provided the lead voice, HQ, for Ubisoft's Rainbow Six: Siege, anchoring one of Ubisoft's most profitable games in its history, with over 70 million registered players worldwide as of 2021. Acting since he was a child, Bailey was a member of The Children's Theatre of Montreal. As an original member of The Piven Theatre Workshop Subscription Company in Evanston, Illinois, Bailey was mentored by the late Byrne Piven, father of actor Jeremy Piven.

== Filmography ==
=== Film ===
- The Real Story of O Christmas Tree – Karl (1991)
- The Real Story of Au Clair de La Lune – Jamie (1992)
- Christopher Columbus – Young Christopher Columbus (1992)
- Betaville – Tony Kash (2001)
- Revenge of the Middle-Aged Woman – Richard
- S.S. Doomtrooper – Jean-Michele (2006)
- Death And Taxis – Joshua (2007)
- The Long Night – Craig (2008)
- Better Off Ted – Hal (2009)
- Sarah's Choice – Matt Evans (2009)
- Acts of Violence – Tom (2010)
- Meeting Spencer – Emerson Todd (2011)
- The History of Love – Jeff (2016)
- He's Out There – Owen (2018)
- The Hummingbird Project – Elliot (2018)
- Dark Phoenix – Shuttle Commander (2019)

=== Television ===
- Ox Tales – Moe the Mole (1988)
- Jungle Book Shonen Mowgli – Mowgli (1989–1990)
- Bumpety Boo – Ken (1989)
- Nutsberry Town – Snappy Onion (1989)
- Saban's Adventures of Peter Pan – Tootles, and additional voices (1990)
- Saban's Adventures of the Little Mermaid – additional voices (1991)
- Madeline – Pepito (1991)
- A Bunch of Munsch – Thomas (1991)
- The Little Lulu Show – additional voices (1995)
- For The People – Scott Wilson (2002–2003)
- Judging Amy – Clayton Leonard (2002)
- Just Shoot Me! – Nick (2003)
- NCIS – P.O. Ronald Zuger (2003)
- 10-8: Officers on Duty – Kenny (2003)
- JAG – Lt. Cody Smathers (2005)
- Charmed – Copy Editor (2005)
- The Conquest of America – Admiral Coligny (2005)
- The Young and the Restless – Vincent, Bartender at Indigo (October 27, 2006 – February 2007)
- Helix – Lt. Humphries (2015)
- The Art of More – Brian Coleman (2015)
- Quantico – Agent Hayes/ND FBI Agent (2015)
- Real Detective – Detective Parson (2016)
- Three Pines - Peter Morrow (2022)
- Classé secret (2023) – Lieutenant Devlin

=== Video games ===
- Rainbow Six: Siege – HQ (2015)
- Deus Ex: Mankind Divided – Vlasta Novak, Additional Voices, Red Shoes Inmate (A Criminal Past DLC) (2016)
- For Honor – Viking Soldier (2017)
- Far Cry 5 – Deputy Sheriff Staci Pratt (2018)
- The Outlast Trials - Sergeant Leland Coyle (2023)
