= Batata (film) =

- Directed by: Noura Kevorkian
- Written by: Noura Kevorkian
- Produced by: Paul Scherzer; Noura Kevorkian
- Cinematography: Noura Kevorkian
- Edited by: Noura Kevorkian; Mike Munn
- Production companies: Saaren Films; Musa Dagh Productions; Six Island Productions
- Distributed by: Six Island Productions
- Release date: January 20, 2022 (FIPADOC)
- Running time: 125 minutes
- Countries: Canada; Lebanon
- Languages: Arabic; Armenian

Batata is a Canadian-Lebanese documentary film, directed by Noura Kevorkian and released in 2022. The film is a portrait of Maria, a Syrian woman working in Lebanon whose life is upended by the Syrian civil war and its associated refugee crisis.

The film had originally been conceived in 2009, prior to the outbreak of the war, as a portrait of Maria's father Abu Jamil and farmer Movses (Mousa) Doudaklian, two men who built a close friendship through years of working together on Doudaklian's potato farm in Lebanon despite the history of enmity between Lebanese Christians and Syrian Muslims. As the outbreak of the war turned the farm into a desolate refugee camp, its focus shifted more squarely onto Maria, depicting her determination to keep her family safe and united in the face of the larger forces that threatened to destroy them.

== Distribution ==
The film premiered in January 2022 at the FIPADOC film festival in Biarritz, France, and had its Canadian premiere in April at the 2022 Hot Docs Canadian International Documentary Festival.

== Awards ==
Award	Date of ceremony	Category	Recipient(s)	Result	Ref(s)
Canadian Screen Awards	April 2023	Best Feature Length Documentary	Paul Scherzer, Noura Kevorkian	Nominated	
Canadian Screen Awards	April 2023	Best Cinematography in a Documentary	Noura Kevorkian	Nominated	
Canadian Screen Awards	April 2023	Best Editing in a Documentary	Noura Kevorkian, Mike Munn	Nominated	
Directors Guild of Canada	2023	Allan King Award for Best Documentary Film	Noura Kevorkian	Nominated	
Hot Docs Canadian International Documentary Festival	2022	Best Canadian Feature Documentary, Special Jury Prize	Noura Kevorkian	Honored	
Peabody Awards	2023	83rd Annual Award	Noura Kevorkian	Won	
