= Mumbi Macharia =

Kenyan poet and writer (born 1997)

Mūmbi Macharia
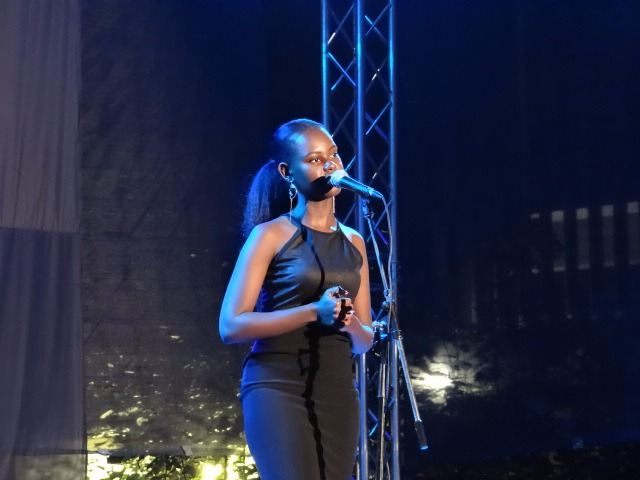
- Born: Lisa Mūmbi Macharia; 1997 (age 28–29); Nairobi, Kenya
- Education: Riara University; University of Copenhagen
- Occupation: Spoken-word poet
- Writing career
- Pen name: Mumbi Poetry
- Years active: 2016–present
- Genre: Spoken word
- Website: mumbimacharia.wordpress.com

Mūmbi Macharia (born 1997) is a Kenyan performing spoken-word poet and writer. She published her first poetry collection, When I Learned How To Walk & Other Poems, in 2020, and she is also known as a blogger, content creator and event curator. In 2021, aged 24, she was described by Citizen Digital in Kenya as one of the most sought-after spoken-word artists in the country, writing poetry that is "raw, vulnerable, and sultry".

== Early years and education ==
Macharia was born and brought up in Nairobi, Kenya. She attended Nairobi International School, where her passion for spoken-word poetry began; as she has said: "Spoken word has been close to my heart from the time I was in high school."

She received a bachelor's degree in Law from Riara University in Nairobi, and went on to earn her MA in African Studies in 2024 at the University of Copenhagen's Centre of African Studies, writing her thesis on "spoken word poetry as a site for expressing identity and belonging in Kenya". She subsequently began teaching Kiswahili as a foreign language at the Center of African Studies.

== Career ==
Beginning her spoken-word career in 2016, Macharia has performed at Kwani? Open Mic, PAL (Poetry After Lunch) at the Kenya Cultural Center, and Slam Africa. Her debut poetry book, When I Learned How To Walk And Other Poems, which contained 17 poems, was self-published in 2020, having in the same year won the Sondeka Award for Kenyan Spoken Word Poet of the Year.

In 2021, she released her debut EP, entitled Libation, dedicated to her Kenyan heritage, and comprising five poems.

Macharia is also a social activist, and has written about a variety of issues, including the plight of commercial sex workers in Kenya. In May 2023, she spoke and performed her new poem "We Are The 1.8 Billion" at the World Health Assembly, where the Director-General of WHO welcomed her as an "acclaimed poet and voice for youth and health".

She is a contributor to the 2024 anthology Let Us Conspire and Other Stories, edited by Billy Kahora. The collection resulted from workshops hosted in May 2022 by Jahazi Press together with the creative writing teaching platform Saseni!, sessions being led by Yvonne Adhiambo Owuor, Peter Kimani, Mikhail Iossel, and Prof Mohamed Bakari.

== Awards and nominations ==
- 2016: Runner-up, Slam Africa
- 2018: Nominee, Sondeka Awards, Best Spoken Word Artist
- 2018: Poetry After Lunch Recognition Award
- 2019: Nominee, Cafe Ngoma Awards, Spoken Word Poet of the Year
- 2020: Winner, Sondeka Awards Best Spoken Word Poet
- 2022: Winner, Sondeka Awards Best Spoken Word Poet
