= He's Out There =

2018 horror film directed by Quinn Lasher

- Theatrical release poster
- Directed by: Dennis Iliadis (as Quinn Lasher)
- Written by: Mike Scannell
- Produced by: Adrienne Biddle
- Starring: Yvonne Strahovski; Anna Pniowsky; Abigail Pniowsky; Ryan McDonald; Justin Bruening
- Cinematography: Ed Wild
- Edited by: Rick Shaine
- Music by: Nathan Whitehead
- Production companies: Unbroken Pictures; Octane Entertainment
- Distributed by: Vertical Entertainment
- Release dates: August 26, 2018 (FrightFest); September 14, 2018 (United States)
- Running time: 89 minutes
- Country: United States
- Language: English

He's Out There is a 2018 American slasher film directed by Dennis Iliadis (credited as Quinn Lasher) and written by Mike Scannell. The film stars Yvonne Strahovski, Anna Pniowsky, Abigail Pniowsky, Ryan McDonald, and Justin Bruening. It was released on September 14, 2018, by Vertical Entertainment.

== Plot ==
With her husband Shawn planning to arrive later, Laura takes her two young daughters, Kayla “K.K.” and Madison “Maddie”, to a remote lake house for their annual family getaway. When they arrive, area resident Owen mentions that the family who previously lived in the house had a son named John who went missing. Meanwhile, at a gas station, Shawn buys the girls a music box.

While playing outside, Kayla and Maddie follow a long red string, which leads to a tea party set up in the middle of the forest, where there are two cupcakes on the table. Maddie eats one, but Kayla saves hers to give to Shawn. In the night, Maddie gets sick and vomits up a small piece of ribbon with the word "hello" written on it. Kayla tells Laura about the cupcakes and, in the cupcake Kayla saved, Laura finds another ribbon inside with the word "goodbye" on it.

Laura tries to call 911 but the landline is down. After hearing unsettling noises from upstairs, Laura goes out to her car to search for her cellphone and finds a strange doll in the backseat. Laura leaves the house with the girls but as she drives away, two wheels fall off the car and it crashes.

Back in the house, Laura finds a family photo with everyone's faces scratched out, except for hers. They also see a dark clothed and masked man standing outside, later revealed as John, just as Shawn arrives. He calls Laura's cellphone and hears John breathing heavily on the other end. Shawn then follows a red string into the forest where mannequins are positioned like a family in effigy around the tea party. John appears and kills Shawn with an axe.

More strange noises are heard inside the house. John uses a recording of Shawn's voice to lure Laura outside. Shawn's dead body suddenly drops from the roof with his eyes gouged out. When the lights in the house go out, Laura and the kids run outside, to find dolls that look like them - a woman hanging by a rope and child dolls on the swings. Eggs are thrown at them. They run inside. The female doll is thrown into the house at them through a window. Laura hides the girls in a closet upstairs while she recovers Shawn's car keys from his body. Owen arrives at the house to investigate the commotion. He is outside walking around with a light and sees Laura inside tapping on a window. John appears and kills him with an axe.

Downstairs, Laura finds the doll in the kitchen, along with a storybook altered with handmade pages depicting John's plan to kill everyone. As they prepare to leave again, John unexpectedly breaks through the front door and captures Laura. Kayla grabs a kitchen knife. He then plays a children's song to lure Kayla and Maddie outside, thinking it's Shawn outside. They run to Shawn's car, only to find presents in the back seat, and their mother bound and gagged in the trunk. John swings his axe into Laura's side, gets in the car and drives toward the girls, chasing them back to the house.

John finds Kayla and Maddie hiding under a bed. He tells them it's ok to be scared, and his name is John. He explains to them that he grew up in the house and has been stalking Laura's family during each of their annual trips. John speaks cryptically about the storybook's significance and how he used to read it as a child. He flips the bed and captures both girls knocking them out to sleep.

By morning, it is shown that Shawn's eyes and arms are now on the mannequin. Laura is still alive, and John removes the axe from her side. John brings the unconscious sisters to his effigy collection in the forest and starts to prepare the girl mannequins to replace the wood parts with the girl's real parts. He prepares to chop off one of the girl's arms, when he hears a music box playing. He goes to investigate and having recovered, Laura has distracted John and attacks him with his axe, and he collapses to the ground. They struggle, but Laura fights back and eventually stabs him in the back. Kayla and Maddie reunite with their mother. She gets the girls in Shawn's car and sees John still laying on the ground with the axe in his back. She drives away, but the engine stalls. Laura manages to re-start it. As they look back, they see that John's body has disappeared.

== Cast ==
- Yvonne Strahovski as Laura, Shawn's wife and mother of Kayla and Maddie
- Anna Pniowsky as Kayla "K.K", Laura and Shawn's daughter and Maddie's older sister
- Abigail Pniowsky as Madison "Maddie", Laura and Shawn's daughter and Kayla's younger sister
- Justin Bruening as Shawn, Laura's husband and father of Kayla and Maddie
- Julian Bailey as Owen, Laura's neighbor
- Ryan McDonald as John, the masked man
- Stephanie Costa as store clerk

== Production ==
On March 11, 2016, Screen Gems hired Dennis Iliadis to direct a horror thriller film He's Out There, from a script by Mike Scannell, which would be produced by Bryan Bertino and Adrienne Biddle of Unbroken Pictures. On June 22, 2016, Yvonne Strahovski was cast in the film to play a mother of two daughters who has to fight for her own and her daughters' life.

Principal photography on the film began on July 29, 2016, in the Laurentides region of Montreal, Québec, Canada.

== Release ==
Screen Gems initially had distribution rights to the film, but dropped it, after which it was acquired by Vertical Entertainment. It was released on September 14, 2018.
