= A Brand New You =

- Poster
- Directed by: Kathryn Palmateer; Shawn Whitney
- Written by: Shawn Whitney
- Produced by: Marie Adler; Stephane Boutros; Kathryn Palmateer; Freya Ravensbergen; Manuel Rodriguez-Saenz; Shawn Whitney
- Starring: Freya Ravensbergen; Manuel Rodriguez-Saenz; Clinton Lee Pontes
- Cinematography: Alex Lisman
- Edited by: Luke Sargent
- Music by: Tristan Capacchione
- Production company: Dangerous Dusk Productions
- Distributed by: Adler & Associates
- Release date: April 6, 2014 (Houston WorldFest)
- Running time: 83 minutes
- Country: Canada
- Languages: English, Spanish

A Brand New You is a 2014 Canadian dark comedy film, directed by Kathryn Palmateer and Shawn Whitney, and starring Freya Ravensbergen, Manuel Rodriguez-Saenz, Clinton Lee Pontes and Vanessa Burns. The film was described as "a low-key comedy about a widower (Manuel Rodriguez-Saenz) who enlists his roommates (Clinton Lee Pontes, Freya Ravensbergen) in a half-baked scheme to clone his dead wife".

A Brand New You is considered a microbudget film and was produced on a shoestring. It was shot in Toronto, Ontario, Canada. It is the first feature film of married couple directors Kathryn Palmateer and Shawn Whitney. The film was hailed an filmmaking achievement by critics and garnered accolades for the director as a first feature.

== Plot ==
In this quirky dark comedy Santiago Morales (Manuel Rodriguez-Saenz) a former engineer, is unable to come to terms with the passing of his wife Viviana (Dalal Badr) who has died of cancer. Santiago rents a room in a house as he struggles to get his financial affairs from the marriage sorted out. He quickly becomes suicidal, obsessing over his late wife by watching videos of her on an iPad and building a shrine to her in his room. Santiago is very particular and keeps things neat, tidy, and organized which leads to clashes with his housemate/landlord Murray (Clinton Lee Pontes) who is a total slob and spends most of his time in his underwear in the living room of the house surrounded by trash and clutter. Santiago discovers that Murray is actually a disgraced geneticist with too much time on his hands. Murray was a rising star in the cloning field until he was caught conducting illegal experiments and was fired. He is itching to get back in the saddle so together they devise a plan involving the other housemate, Laura (Freya Ravensbergen), to clone Santiago's dead wife and thereby bring her back to life. Laura has just lost her waitressing job and is unable to pay her debts so when presented with a relative financial windfall for her role, she reluctantly agrees to take part in the scheme to be the surrogate for their bizarro cloning experiment.

The film is unique and offbeat as the often twisted humour is made genuinely funny by the actors. The logic and consequences of the characters schemes seem secondary. For example, it doesn't appear to bother Santiago that his wife would be a baby and not in fact "Viviana" in any way other than genetically. In fact he misses her to such an extreme that its hard not to end up rooting for him to see her.

There is a secondary plot about another scientist seeking to undermine Murray's work. This comes into play as Santiago and Murray attempt to source the equipment they need for their experiment. Ultimately and perhaps predictably, the entire scheme ends up in danger of falling apart and that's when the creativity in the film shines. The character work and script development keep the characters moving along their dramatic arch in a funny and unique way.

== Cast ==
- Freya Ravensbergen ... Laura
- Manuel Rodriguez-Saenz ... Santiago Morales
- Clinton Lee Pontes ... Murray Wyndham / Victor Soares
- Elizabeth Whitmere ...The Undertaker
- Barbara de la Fuente ... Marny
- Michael Lake ... Nerdy Dude
- Vanessa Burns ... Natalie
- Edsson Morales ... Phil
- William Ellis ... Nerdy Dude
- Toni Ellwand ... Real Estate Agent
- Dalal Badr ... Viviana
- Scott McCullouch ... Dr. Steven Moritz
- Charles Burton ... Marny's Husband

== Production ==
Kathryn Palmateer a freelance photographer by trade and Shawn Whitney a filmmaker, writer and story editor are a married couple who were inspired to make A Brand New You for the opportunity to create together. In July 2014 Kathryn launched a book featuring photos and stories of women who have had abortions entitled One Kind Word: Women Share Their Abortion Stories.

Having very limited resources meant much about the filmmaking process relied heavily on the pragmatism of the filmmakers and their determination to get it done. Pre-production focussed on having a great script, finding a great cinematographer, actors, and music. The directors were inspired by the mumblecore movement of filmmakers. Alex Lisman the cinematographer had a documentary background so the directors knew he could shoot fast and solidly.

The 95+ page script was shot on location in only 12 days with some days shooting 12 pages in the day. The filmmakers sacrificed coverage to get the day done and focussed instead on tonal consistency to balance both the funny and sad aspects of the performances and script.

== Reaction ==
=== Critical response ===
A Brand New You was well received by Canadian film critics. In his review for the NOW Magazine, Norman Wilner praised the cast: "the characters are so weirdly specific and the actors who play them so invested that it kind of works in spite of itself" he refers to the production quality's budget related shortcomings. The film subsequently appeared in a "worth a watch " year end list of Now Magazine in 2015. On his Film Corner blog critic Greg Klymkiw offers the praise "by generating characters and situations we NEVER see in the movies is one of the ways the picture succeeds". All of the critical writing on the film consistently praises the unusual premis in the film and the commitment of the directors to their vision and of the actors to their characters.

== Accolades ==
- Best First Feature Victoria Texas Indie Film Fest 2015
- Best Dark Comedy Worldfest-Houston International Film Festival 2014
- Best Feature Comedy Highway 61 Film Festival 2014
- Nominee Best Supporting Actor Worldfest-Houston International Film Festival 2014
