= Silas Kpanan'Ayoung Siakor =

Liberian activist

- Occupation: Environmentalist
- Known for: Grassroots environmentalism
- Notable work: Silas Siakor was featured in the 2017 film Silas, directed by Anjali Nayar and Hawa Essuman.
- Awards: Goldman Environmental Prize (2006)

Silas Kpanan'Ayoung Siakor is a Liberian environmentalist. He was awarded the Goldman Environmental Prize in 2006, for his revealing of illegal logging in Liberia and its connection to the civil war, leading to export sanctions from the United Nations Security Council.

Silas Siakor was featured in the 2017 film Silas, directed by Anjali Nayar and Hawa Essuman.

== Works ==
Silas Siakor provided proof that Liberian leader Charles Taylor utilized the proceeds from uncontrolled, widespread deforestation to finance the expenses of a savage 14-year civil war that resulted in the demise of 150,000 individuals. Siakor, taking a significant personal risk, gathered highly challenging proof of fabricated deforestation documents, illicit deforestation procedures, and related human rights violations. He presented the evidence to the United Nations Security Council, which consequently prohibited the exportation of Liberian timber.

Following Taylor's removal from power in 2003, Siakor has collaborated with Liberia's current administration to establish enduring timber regulations and empower the indigenous forest communities via the inaugural Forest People's Congress, which he founded. He is also contributing to the Liberian Forest Initiative, a $4 million project helmed by the United States' State Department and National Forest Service, to bolster Liberia's forest reformation endeavors.

== Awards ==
Siakor was awarded the Goldman Prize in 2006 for taking great personal risks to release evidence that former Liberian President Charles Taylor used profits from illegal logging to pay for a brutal civil war.
