= The Rest of Us (film) =

2019 Canadian drama film

- Film poster
- Directed by: Aisling Chin-Yee
- Written by: Alanna Francis
- Produced by: Emma Fleury; Katie Bird Nolan; Lindsay Tapscott; William Woods
- Starring: Heather Graham; Jodi Balfour; Sophie Nélisse; Abigail Pniowsky
- Cinematography: Daniel Grant
- Edited by: Véronique Barbe; Aisling Chin-Yee
- Production companies: Babe Nation Films; Woods Entertainment
- Distributed by: levelFILM
- Release date: September 6, 2019 (TIFF)
- Running time: 80 minutes
- Country: Canada
- Language: English

The Rest of Us is a 2019 Canadian drama film, directed by Aisling Chin-Yee. It stars Heather Graham as a single mother (to Sophie Nélisse's character), who reluctantly takes in her ex-husband's second wife and their daughter (played by Jodi Balfour and Abigail Pniowsky) as houseguests after his untimely death leaves his new family homeless.

It premiered at the 2019 Toronto International Film Festival, and was acquired by levelFILM for Canadian distribution.

== Cast ==
- Heather Graham as Cami Hayes
- Sophie Nélisse as Aster
- Abigail Pniowsky as Talulah
- Jodi Balfour as Rachel
- Charlie Gillespie as Nathan
- Tameka Griffiths as Gabby

== Production ==
The film was shot in North Bay, Ontario in 2018.

== Critical reception ==
On the review aggregation website Rotten Tomatoes, the film holds an approval rating of 92%, based on 12 reviews, with an average rating of 7.3/10.

The Hollywood Reporter's Sheri Linden praised the film as "sharply written and sensitively played." NOW Magazine's Norman Wilner called it "a small, delicate drama—maybe too small, since the 80-minute running time has the effect of compressing certain emotional beats," but concluded, "It’s not a bad thing when a film leaves you wishing it were longer." Exclaim!'s Alex Hudson agreed that the short runtime didn't benefit the story, but wrote, "As a small-scale examination of a unique form of grief, it packs a lot of emotional complexity into a small package."
