= Billy Kahora =

Kenyan writer and editor

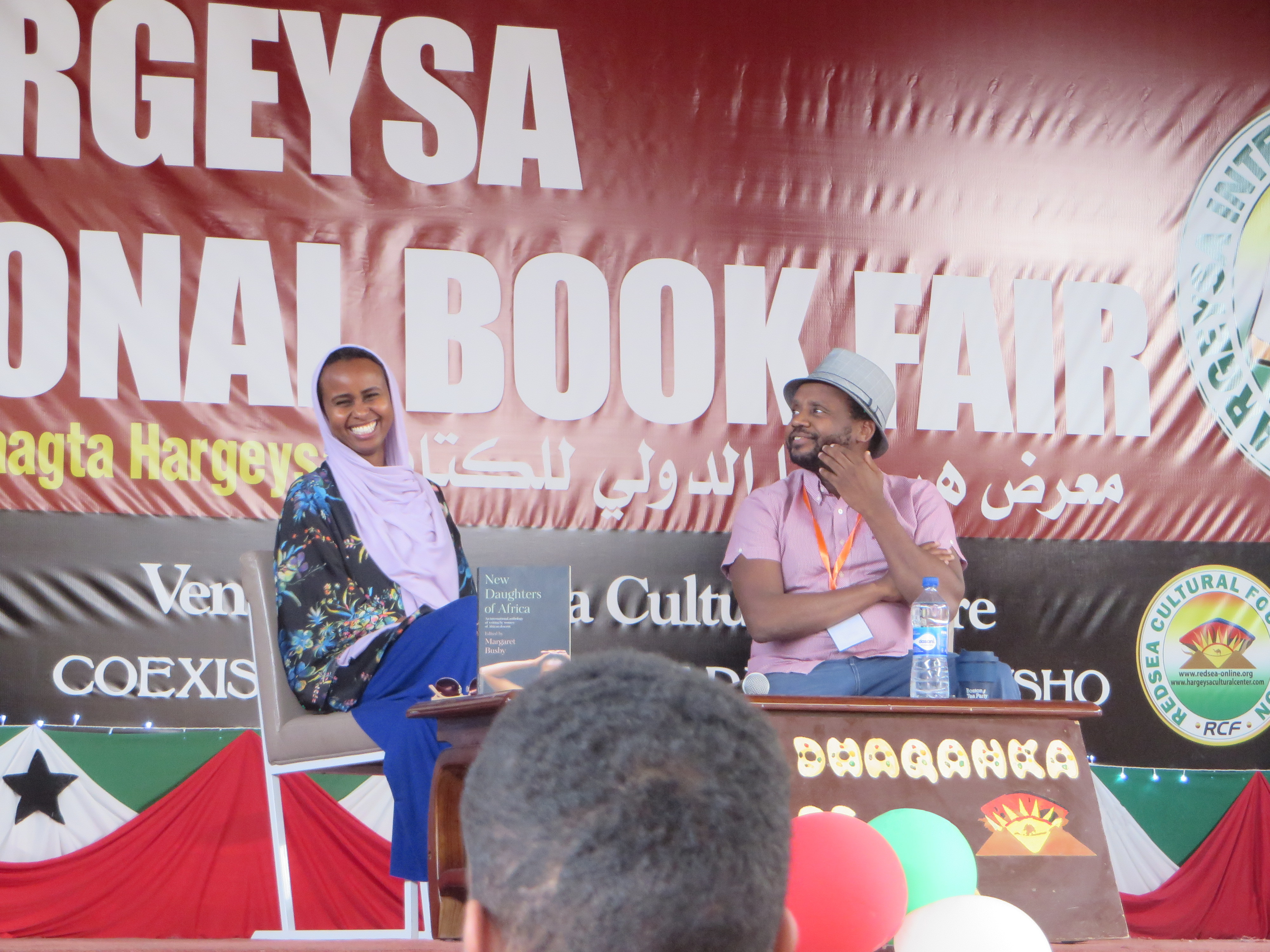
- Nadifa Mohamed in discussion with Kahora, Hargeisa International Book Fair 2019
- Born: Nairobi, Kenya
- Education: Rhodes University
- Occupations: Writer and editor

Billy Kahora is a Kenyan writer and editor based in Nairobi. He was commended by the 2007 Caine Prize judges for his story Treadmill Love. His stories "Urban Zoning" and "Gorilla's Apprentice" were shortlisted for the prize in 2012 and 2014, respectively. He is the author of works including the non-fiction book The True Story of David Munyakei (2008), wrote the screenplay for Soul Boy (2010) and co-wrote Nairobi Half Life (2012). As Managing Editor of Kwani Trust, Kahora has edited seven issues of the Kwani? journal. He is a contributing editor to the Chimurenga Chronic.

== Published works ==
- The True Story of David Munyakei: Goldenberg Whistleblower. African Books Collective. 2008. ISBN 978-9966-7008-9-6.
- Billy Kahora; Parselelo Kantai; Andia Kisia; Tony Adam Mochama; Valentine Njoroge (2014). Six and the City: 6 Short Plays on Nairobi. Native Intelligence. ISBN 978-9966-1553-8-2.
- The Cape Cod Bicycle War And Other Stories. Ohio University Press (USA), Huza Press (Rwanda). 2020.

=== As editor ===
- Let Us Conspire and Other Stories. Jahazi Press. 2024. p. 160. ISBN 9789914768886. (Contributors: Idza Luhumyo, Mumbi Macharia, Munira Hussein, Daniella Malinda, Buke Abduba, Kiprop Kimutai, Imou Eparis, Florence Onyango, Dennis Mugaa, Gladwell Pamba, Vera Kabushemeye, Ndegwa Nguru, Florence C Waita, Ndungu Njeru, Noella Moshi.)
