= Christian Langlois =

Canadian creative director

Christian Langlois (French pronunciation: [kʁistjɑ̃ lɑ̃ɡlwa]) is a Canadian film and multimedia director and creative director - expert in entertainment, based in Montreal, Quebec. He has collaborated at premium series, films, documentaries, varieties tv programs and cultural magazines, commercials films, music videos and immersive multimedia installations. He studied at Université du Québec à Montréal in communications programs: new media, digital cinema and video and advertising.

== Career ==
After completing graduate studies in new media and digital art, Langlois began his career in electronic arts and video installations. His work was presented in several international institutions and he was invited to the Danaë Art Foundation in France, where he was received by the French Minister of Culture and the mayor of Blois.

Early in his career, he worked as a video artist and creative director, and co-founded the creative laboratory at MusiquePlus, a Québec music television network. The lab focused on broadcast design, music programming and visual experimentation, earning recognition including Prix Gémeaux and Promax Awards.

Langlois later moved into advertising as a film director and creative contributor, collaborating with several creative agencies and production companies, including Propaganda Films, Jet Films, Honey & Milk, The Garden and Rodeo. His viral digital campaign A Personal Apology for OB reached more than 47 million views online and received 22 international awards.

His creative director, design and director work has taken him across the globe, as far afield as Mongolia, working on the brand image of a national TV, MongolTV He has created opening sequences for prestigious series such as Marie-Antoinette and Versailles for Canal+ and BBC, for series Acceptable Risk and Hidden Assets for Rte One, Sundance Channel, Primevideo, Britbox, Acorn. He contributed to the success of documentaries for the National Film Board of Canada on global issues, Middle Eastern politics, new journalism, and remote work: Working different, High wire, Freelancer on the front line.

Recently, he collaborated on the visual development and visual signature of the television series Heated Rivalry, directed by Jacob Tierney and distributed internationally on platforms including HBO Max, Canal+, Sky and Crave.

He also contributed to the visual signature of the feature thriller Veins (Nervures), directed by Raymond Saint-Jean. The film has been showcased at festivals including Cinemania, Tallinn Black Nights Film Festival, Gérardmer International Fantastic Film Festival, and Fantasy Filmfest Nights, and was pre-selected at the Locarno Film Festival.

In the documentary field, Langlois worked on creative development, visual effects design and AI-generated imagery direction for the high end science documentary series Transparent Earth, produced for PBS, NHK, and France Télévisions (In production).

He also contributed at the Creative Direction of the feature documentary film Parachute, of Erik Cimon, which explores the history of the Montréal fashion brand Parachute, known for its influence on underground fashion in the 1980s and for dressing artists such as Madonna, Michael Jackson, and Peter Gabriel.(In production).

In addition to his work, Langlois has been involved in the development of immersive media and digital installations for cultural institutions and public spaces, collaborating on projects for Newark Liberty International Airport, the National Geographic Society, and the Smithsonian Institution. immersive experiences and digital activation for airport terminals, museums, and cultural districts.

His work has earned him numerous prestigious awards, Cannes Lions, Clio, SXSW, Lia, The Bessies, Webby, Promax BDA, David Ogilvy and Applied Arts.

== Filmography + Videography - Collaboration ==
- Heated Rivalry - Accent Aigue / Series - HBOmax, Sky, Canal+, Crave
- Control-C - mémoire liquide / Feature generative film - In production
- Parachute Art Total - Extérieur Jour / Doc. / Historia - In production
- Veins - Nervures - 1976 / Feature genre film - Cinemania, Tallinn Black Nights Film Festival, Gérardmer International Fantastic Film Festival, and Fantasy Filmfest Nights, Locarno Film Festival.
- Transparent Earth 1, 2, 3 - Bolder Brighter Studios / Docs. Series - PBS, NHK, France Télévisons - in production
- Base Camp, National Geographic - GSM Project - Dpt. / Immersive and interactive experiences - in production
- Working different ONF-NFB (French Studio - Vancouver - Toronto) / Documentary film
- Les Matérialistes - Dark Matter Labs - Architecture sans frontières / Short expectative documentary
- Marie Antoinette 1, 2 - Canal+, BBC2, PBS, Radio Canada Télé - Capa Drama / Series
- Hidden Assets 1, 2 - Rte One Irland BBC UK, BritBox / Series
- 25 years of design Latitude Nord / Branded content - 12 episodes
- L’Atelier Vrai - Vidéotron - FairPlay / Documentary series
- Digital journey of surprises NYC Port Authority - Newark Airport - Moment factory / Immersive installations and experiences
- Experiences: Sjaella Fürstenwalder Musikzyklus - Berlin / XR Immersive concert experiences, virtual recital,
- Signature Series - Yvon Jardel - Animation + vfx Obox - LaSalle College International / Master classes - 12 episodes
- Fiction to nonfiction RF architecture NYC / Art and architecture film - Documentary film
- Sur la Corde Raide, National Film Board of Canada, - Documentary film
- Voyce, Summer Lust - Music video
- Rosenfeld, On the Front Lines, National Film Board of Canada, - Documentary film
- OB - A Personal Apology - Viral and digital ad
- Michael Mooney, Open your eyes, - Interactive Music video
- La Voix, cet otage merveilleux - 25 shorts
- Jorane, Dit-elle - Music video
- Rudy Caya, Mourrir de rire - Music video
- Jean-Pierre Ferland, - Music video
- Virtuel - Video installation
- Le sale à manger - Video installation, 20 shorts
- La caverne d'Érika - Short
- Station - Documentary about contemporary art
- 14 Stations - Documentary about contemporary art
- Si tu es sage on ira voir la guerre - Short film

== Television ==
- NBC - NFL Sunday Night Football, 2019 TV opening sequence, NBC Networks and NFL, Rodeo FX
- TVA 2016, 2017, 2018, 2019, 2020 TV Launching promos, Group TVA, Quebecor Media
- Freelancer on the Front Lines 2016 documentary Opening sequence and Creative direction, NFB, National Film Board of Canada
- Acceptable Risk, TV series, RTI Ireland, Sundance Channel, Los Angeles (Opening and broadcast design)
- Versailles, TV series, Canal+. Capa Drama, Incendo, Paris, (Opening and broadcast design)
- Nouvelle Adresse, TV series, Ici Radio Canada télé, (Opening and broadcast design)
- TVA 2013, 2014 and 2015 TV Branding and visual identity, Idents and promo graphic kit, Group TVA, Quebecor Media
- MongolTV, TV Branding and visual identity, 20 idents, Group Gatsurt, Oulanbator, Mongolia
- Moi&Cie TV Branding and visual identity, 10 idents Group TVA, Quebecor Media
- Mlle, TV Branding and visual identity, 10 idents, Group TVA, Quebecor Media
- Mauvais Karma, TV series, Ici Radio Canada télé, (Opening and broadcast design)
- Yoopa, TVA group, Sid Lee, (Animation for TV Ids and broadcast design)
- Zed, Artv, CBC, Tokyo Disney, Cirque du Soleil, (Manga animation, opening and broadcast design)
- Sophie, ABC-CBC, (Opening and broadcast design)
- Rumeurs, SRC, (Opening and broadcast design)
- Tupperware, Bowl of success, CBC,(Opening and broadcast design)
- Les Francs Tireurs, Télé Quebec (Opening and broadcast design)
- Musicographie, TVA -Musimax (Opening and broadcast design)
- Buzzé, MusiquePlus (Opening and broadcast design)
- Mamuz, MusiquePlus (Opening and broadcast design)
- Electrochoc, MusiquePlus (Opening and broadcast design)
- Perfecto Mode, SRC (Opening and broadcast design)
- Mamuz, MusiquePlus (Opening and broadcast design)
- Chic Planète, Musimax (Opening and broadcast design)
- D., TV5 (Opening and broadcast design)
- Perfectly Fit with Claudia Schiffer, CBS (Opening and broadcast design)
- Dadabiz, MusiquePlus (Direction of 2 seasons x 52 episodes cultural TV show)
- Gala, MusiquePlus (Direction of Musical Video Award TV show)
- Perfecto, MusiquePlus (Opening and broadcast design)
- Fax, MusiquePlus (Opening and broadcast design)
- Top 500 -Profil de la décennie, MusiquePlus,(Direction of documentary program)
- BlackOut, (Opening and broadcast design, program structure)
- BuzzClip, (Opening and broadcast design, program structure)

== Screening - Festivals - exhibitions ==
- Rendez vous Québec Cinéma, Montreal
- SXSW Films, Austin, USA
- RIDM, Montreal
- FNC, Montreal
- Festival du cinéma québécois de Blois, France
- Hots Doc, Toronto
- Festival des films sur l’art, Montreal
- Minutes Moments, Montreal
- Festival Carrousel, Quebec City
- Champ Libre, Montreal
- Les Cinémas du Québec et du Canada, Beaubourg, Paris, France
- Première manifestation internationale vidéo et art électronique, Montreal
- Tournée des centres culturels Mexicains, Mexico,
- Festival international du nouveau cinéma et de la vidéo de Montréal, Montreal
- Galerie La Centrale, Montreal
- Fondation Danaé, France
- Fantaisies vidéos indigènes, Montreal
- Palais Montcalm, Quebec City
- Images, Toronto
- 15 anniversaire du Vidéographe, Montreal
- Itérations, France
- Festival international de films et de vidéos de femmes, Montreal
- Festival vidéo de Liège, Belgium, Tournée de centres culturels Belges, Belgium
- Tournée des centres culturels Indiens, India
- Kaléidoscope - TV5 Monde, Francophonia, France,
- Les Rendez-vous de cinéma québécois, Montreal,
- Images, Toronto
- New Visions, Glasgow, Scotland
- Manifestation internationale de vidéo et de télévision de Montbéliard, France
- Festival internacional de video cidade de Vigo, Spain
- Galerie Obscure, Quebec
- Galerie Oboro, Montreal
- Galerie de Matane, Matane, Canada,
- Film & video festival of Barrie, Canada
