= Noura Kevorkian =

Canadian documentarian

Noura Kevorkian is a Canadian documentary filmmaker best known for her 2022 film Batata, which was the recipient of a 2023 Peabody Award and was submitted for consideration to the 2024 Oscars in the Documentary Feature Category.

== Early life and education ==
Noura Kevorkian was born in Aleppo, Syria and raised in Lebanon until her emigration to Canada in her teens. Kevorkian's upbringing has resulted in her being multi-lingual (Armenian, Arabic, English) and multi-cultural.

Kevorkian's father, Barkev Kevorkian, was the son of refugees, born in the Karantina refugee camp outside Beirut, Lebanon. Born to parents who were survivors of the Armenian genocide (1915-1923), Barkev took an interest in engineering and science books. He became a machine maker with his own foundry in the Bekaa Valley and supplied machine parts to various factories in Beirut during the Lebanese Civil War (1975-1990).

Kevorkian lived through the Lebanese Civil War and several critics have acknowledged this has informed her sense of identity, cultural pride, humanitarianism, and documentary filmmaking.

Kevorkian graduated from the University of Toronto with a Bachelor of Commerce (B.Com.) in economics and finance, with minor studies in Middle East history and cinema studies. Kevorkian trained at the National Film Board of Canada (NFB) and the Summer Institute of Film and Television (SIFT).

== Career ==
Kevorkian produces many of her films under her company Saaren Films.

Kevorkian's first short film, Veils Uncovered (2002), premiered at the International Documentary Film Festival in Amsterdam, Netherlands. Veils Uncovered interviews women from Damascus, Syria, about their relationship to sexuality and staying appealing to their husbands beneath their veils. She is credited with composing and singing two of the a cappella Arabic songs included in the film. Following the short film, Kevorkian contributed a journal entry to a book entitled The Secret Life of Syrian Lingerie by Malu Halasa, including experiences she had during her time in Syria when making the film. The Kunsthal Museum in Rotterdam, Netherlands, has exhibited both Kevorkian's written content and her short film.

Dreams of Education (2003) is a short documentary about the aspirations of high school students. As the writer and director of the film, Kevorkian explores young people and their anxieties about the cost of higher education.

She directed her second documentary, Anjar: Flowers, Goats and Heroes (2009), which was acknowledged by critics as highlighting a history of intergenerational transmission of memory through oral history. This film was also the first of several of her films to be backed in part by Six Island Productions. Anjar: Flowers, Goats and Heroes documents life in a small Armenian village. Kevorkian makes connections between this village and a group of 1915 genocide survivors, as well as to the Lebanese Civil War under which she grew up.

Kevorkian also directed, edited, and produced the documentary film 23 Kilometres (2015), which screened at the Karlovy Vary International Festival in the Czech Republic as her debut feature. 23 Kilometres (2015) is Kevorkian's most personal documentary as it shines the spotlight on her father, Barkev Kevorkian, in the midst of his Parkinson's disease.

Batata (2022) is a feature documentary covering 10 years in the life of a Syrian woman named Maria and her family of potato farmers who find themselves stuck in Lebanon as stateless refugees during the Syrian refugee crisis. Maria's father forms an unlikely friendship with an Armenian-Lebanese farmer named Mousa. The year of its release, Batata was highlighted in an interview by the United Nations High Committee for Refugees through its partner program "Diaspora" during its screening at the Hot Docs Canadian International Documentary Festival, with the goal of giving a platform to immigrant and refugee voices.

== Filmography ==
Noura Kevorkian Filmography
Name	Year	Role
Veils Uncovered	2002	Director, Producer, Editor, Screenplay, Narrator, Composer, Singer
Dreams of Education	2003	Writer, Director
Anjar: Flowers, Goats and Heroes	2009	Director, Producer
23 Kilometres	2015	Director, Producer, Editor, Narrator
Batata	2022	Director, Producer, Editor, Cinematography

== Awards and honors ==
Veils Uncovered was nominated for Best Documentary at the Reelworld Film Festival and Yorkton Film Festival.

Batata won the 2022 Peabody Award and the 2023 Vanguard Award from the Documentary Organization of Canada (DOC).

Kevorkian has also served as a juror for the Best Canadian Documentary Award at the Lunenberg Film Festival in Nova Scotia, Canada.
