= Hawa Essuman =

Kenyan film director

- Born: 23 January 1980 (age 46); Hamburg, Germany
- Citizenship: Kenyan
- Occupations: film director; producer
- Years active: 2008 - Present
- Known for: Silas, Soul Boy
- Awards: Amnesty International Durban Human Rights Award (2018) and the Audience Award for best documentary at the Riverrun Film Festival (2018).

Hawa Essuman (born 23 January 1980) is a film director based in Nairobi, Kenya. Her 2017 feature-length documentary Silas, co-directed with Anjali Neyar, tells the story of Liberian environmental activist Silas Siakor's fight to preserve the country's rainforests from commercial logging. The film won multiple awards, including the Amnesty International Durban Human Rights Award (2018) and the Audience Award for best documentary at the RiverRun International Film Festival (2018). Hawa's first feature film, Soul Boy (2010), also received a series of awards. In addition, Hawa has produced a range of TV programmes, commercial films, music videos and adverts.

== Biography ==
Born in Hamburg, Germany, on 23 January 1980, she is the daughter of Ghanaian parents who brought her up in Nairobi, Kenya. After several appearances in the theatre, she moved into production work, first on television commercials and documentaries, then on a local drama series, Makutano Junction. She created and directed Selfish? in 2008, followed by three short films in 2008, The Lift, Cold War and Coming Out.

With the encouragement and assistance of Tom Tykwer, she directed Soul Boy (2010). Based on a story by Billy Kahora, it originated at a workshop organized by the German association One Fine Day. Presented at over 40 film festivals around the world, it won a number of awards.

== Awards ==
Essuman's Silas has won the following awards:

- Documentary audience award 2018 – RiverRun International Film Festival
- Best Documentary and Best International Film 2018 – Zanzibar International Film Festival
- Documentary Audience Award 2018 – Afrika Film Festival Köln (de), Germany
- Amnesty International Durban Human Rights Award 2018 – Durban International Film Festival
- Green Warsaw Award 2018 – Warsaw Film Festival
- William W. Warner Beautiful Swimmers Award 2018 – Environmental Film Festival in the Nation's Capital, Washington, USA
- Best documentary feature 2018 – Footcandle Film Festival (North Carolina, USA)

Essuman's Soul Boy has won the following awards:

- Veto Award – Afrika Filmfestival Leuven, Belgium
- Signis Award – Zanzibar International Film Festival
- Polish Filmmakers Association Award – Ale Kino! International Young Audience Film Festival, Poznań, Poland
- Best Short Film – Kalasha Awards, Nairobi, Kenya
- Best Lead Actor: Samson Odhiambo – Kalasha Awards, Nairobi, Kenya
- Best Scriptwriter: Billy Kahora – Kalasha Awards, Nairobi, Kenya
- Best Actor: Samson Odhiambo – Kenya International Film Festival, Nairobi, Kenya
- Best East African Film – Kenya International Film Festival, Nairobi, Kenya
- Special Mention "Passeurs d'images" prize – Festival Ciné Junior (Ciné Junior film festival for Kids), Paris, France
- The Young Jury Prize – Festival Ciné Junior, Paris, France
- Best Fiction Award 2011 – European Spiritual Film Festival, Paris, France
- Best Children's Film Award 2011 – Kirchliches Filmfestival Recklinghausen (de), Germany
- Best Editor: Ephantus Ng'ethe Gitungo – Africa Movie Academy Awards
