= Manfred Becker =

German-Canadian filmmaker (born 1960)

- Born: Manfred Wilhelm Becker; March 9, 1960 (age 66); Wilhelmshaven, Germany,
- Spouse: Susan Meggs
- Children: Sebastian Becker, Jonas Becker

Manfred Becker (born March 10, 1960) is a German-Canadian documentary independent filmmaker and film editor. His work often explores personal stories behind current or historical issues.

Born and raised in Wilhelmshaven, Germany, Becker moved to Canada in 1983. Since 2001, Becker has been writing and directing documentaries for television, his latest, a look at the phenomenon of tourists seeking out places of conflict and fear entitled Dark Tourism, being the eighth. In the past decade Becker has written and directed eight documentaries for television, earning him numerous nominations and awards. His film Fatherland won the Donald Brittain Gemini Award in 2006 for Best Documentary and was screened at Hot Docs and several other festivals internationally.

== Awards ==
Becker has edited feature-length documentaries for Canadian filmmakers Sturla Gunnarsson, Nettie Wild and Paul Jay that have won Gemini, Genie and Chalmers awards and an International Emmy among others. In addition to a Gemini award for Best Editing on Hitman Hart: Wrestling with Shadows (1999), Becker's work on Thin Ice (2000) was nominated for the same category. Becker's work on A Place Called Chiapas led to a Hot Docs award.

== Personal life ==
Becker is married to Susan Meggs, whom he met at a screening in Toronto, where the couple currently reside. They have two children, Jonas and Sebastian, aged 21 and 19.

== Filmography ==
- Death of a Warrior (2001). A documentary about the bombing of the Greenpeace vessel "Rainbow Warrior". For History Television
- Neighbours (2003) A Historical documentary about the crossing paths of Sigmund Freud and Adolf Hitler in a fin-de-siecle Vienna. For History Television
- The Life of Me (2003) A vérité documentary following the workshop of a play for the "Madness in the Arts Festival" featuring actors with mental illness. For TVOntario
- The Siege (2004) Historical documentary on the 1999 siege of a UN compound in East Timor. For History Television
- Fatherland (2004) Feature-length personal essay documentary on history, memory and fatherhood. For History Television
- Hitler's Children: Germany in Autumn 1977 (2006). For History Television
- Diamond Road (2007) 3x one-hour HD documentary series on the global diamond industry. For Discovery Times & DISCOVERY HD, ARTE, ZDF, NHK, Australian and French TV
- Dark Tourism (2008) Vérité documentary on the phenomenon of tourists seeking out places of conflict and fear. For History Television
- Here At Home (2012) Becker is the Toronto director for the National Film Board of Canada web documentary Here At Home, exploring the Mental Health Commission of Canada's efforts to end homelessness for people with mental illness via its At Home initiative.
