= Freya Ravensbergen =

Canadian actress

- Born: Hemmingford, Quebec, Canada
- Occupation: Actress
- Years active: 2006–present

Freya Ravensbergen is a Canadian actress and producer. The first feature film she appeared in was The Legend of Sorrow Creek (2007) where she played Kayla. She is credited as an actor and co-producer of A Brand New You (2014) and Fucking My Way Back Home (2016). In 2006 and 2007 was a voice actress for the character Ginchiyo Tachibana in the video game series Samurai Warriors 2.

== Early life ==
Freya hails from Hemmingford, Quebec, where she grew up on a farm. Her father is a documentary filmmaker and her mother is a teacher. As a youngster she took part in the Hemmingford ShoeString Theatre. She later studied at the Professional Theatre program of Dawson College and at Concordia University in Montreal.

== Career ==
Her first feature film appearance was The Legend of Sorrow Creek (2007) where she played Kayla. She later co-produced and starred in A Brand New You (2014) which was listed in a NOW Magazine 2015 wrap up of "films worth a watch". She stars in the upcoming feature film Fucking My Way Back Home playing the character of Lydia, a sex worker who is looking for redemption. She is credited as a co-producer for this film as well.

== Personal life ==
Freya is married to actor Clinton Pontes. She is a mother and is active on the Toronto ACTRA Women's Committee where she lobbied for parental benefits

== Filmography ==
List of acting performances in film and television
Year	Title	Role	Notes
2006	Samurai Warriors 2	Ginchiyo Tachibana	Video Game
2006	Samurai Warriors 2- Empires	Ginchiyo Tachibana	Video game
2007	Samurai Warriors 2- Xtreme Legends	Ginchiyo Tachibana	Video game
2007	The Legend of Sorrow Creek	Kayla	
2010	Two Worlds II	Kyra	Video game
2014	A Brand New You	Laura	Feature Film, also credited as Co-producer
2014	Fatal Vows	Deb	TV series documentary
2016	Fucking My Way Back Home	Lydia	Feature Film, also credited as Co-producer
