= Gun Runners =

2016 film directed by Anjali Nayar

Gun Runners is a 2016 National Film Board of Canada documentary film directed by Anjali Nayar about two former Kenyan tribal warriors and cattle thieves in an amnesty program who traded in their guns to become marathon runners. The film's origins date back to 2006, when Nayar met Julius Arile and fellow former cattle rustler Robert Matanda at the Tegla Loroupe Peace Race, created to reduce tension among rival tribes in northern Kenya. Nayar initially did a short radio story on the two men, which was broadcast on CBC Radio, and then remained in contact. The film follows the men for over 10 years, through training and races, and documents how their lives diverge: Arile pursues a career in running as well as politics, acting as a Kenyan representative at the UN to speak out against the proliferation of illegal small arms, while Matanda becomes disenchanted. Matanda and his wife would die in a car accident in March 2016, leaving behind seven children, whom Arile, Nayar and others from his community have united to help care for.

== Reception ==
Gun Runners had its world premiere in 2016 at the Hot Docs Canadian International Documentary Festival, followed by a Canadian theatrical release in the fall of 2016, with screenings in a number of Canadian cities, including Toronto during the Scotiabank Toronto Waterfront Marathon. The film's director of photography, Joan Poggio, was nominated for Best Cinematography in a Documentary at the 5th Canadian Screen Awards.

As of February 2017, the film is available on Netflix.
