= No Ordinary Man (film) =

2020 Canadian documentary film

- Theatrical release poster
- Directed by: Aisling Chin-Yee; Chase Joynt
- Written by: Aisling Chin-Yee; Amos Mac
- Produced by: Sarah Spring
- Cinematography: Léna Mill-Reuillard
- Edited by: Aisling Chin-Yee
- Music by: Rich Aucoin; Billy Tipton
- Production company: Parabola Films
- Distributed by: Oscilloscope, Radiant Films International, Les Films du 3 mars
- Release date: September 10, 2020 (TIFF)
- Running time: 80 minutes
- Country: Canada
- Language: English
- Box office: $15,508

No Ordinary Man is a Canadian documentary film, directed by Aisling Chin-Yee and Chase Joynt, and written by Aisling Chin-Yee and Amos Mac. It is a portrait of Billy Tipton, the jazz musician who was revealed after his death to have been transgender.

The film's production was affected by the COVID-19 pandemic in Canada. However, as principal photography was already completed, it mainly affected tasks such as editing and post-production work that could be done remotely.

The film premiered at the 2020 Toronto International Film Festival. It was subsequently screened at the 2020 Inside Out Film and Video Festival, where it won the award for Best Canadian Film.

Oscilloscope Laboratories has acquired U.S. rights to No Ordinary Man.

== Critical response ==
For Now and The Georgia Straight, Kevin Ritchie praised the film, writing that its "overlapping realizations create a complex portrait while making No Ordinary Man as much about the present as it is about the past. [It] ultimately builds to a moving and surprising climax in which the empathetic trans views of Tipton are finally able to eclipse the parochial tabloid tale."

The film was named to TIFF's year-end Canada's Top Ten list for feature films.

In The New Yorker, Richard Brody writes: "In No Ordinary Man, the directors Aisling Chin-Yee and Chase Joynt go fascinatingly, probingly further, to question the very prospect of making a biographical film about their subject, the trans jazz musician Billy Tipton. No Ordinary Man, in that sense, is a genre unto itself, a meta-biographical film about a musician who earned his place in history posthumously, for reasons that he carefully avoided revealing throughout his life."

=== Accolades ===
Year	Award	Category	Recipient(s)	Result	Ref.
2021	Directors Guild of Canada	Allan King Award for Best Documentary Film	Chase Joynt, Aisling-Chin Yee	Nominated	
2022	GLAAD Media Awards	Outstanding Documentary	No Ordinary Man	Nominated	
