= Chase Joynt =

Canadian director and filmmaker

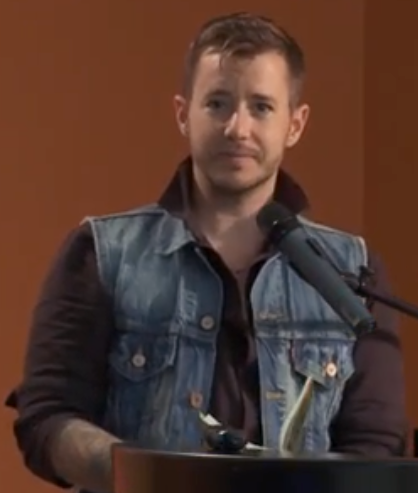
- Reading at the San Francisco Public Library in 2016
- Education: University of California, Los Angeles (B.A. in Theater); York University (M.F.A. in Gender Studies); York University (PhD in Cinema and Media Studies)
- Occupations: Film director, author, professor
- Years active: 2012–present
- Known for: Framing Agnes, No Ordinary Man
- Style: Genre-bending trans documentaries
- Website: www.chasejoynt.com

Chase Joynt is a Canadian filmmaker, writer, video artist, actor, producer, and professor. He attracted acclaim as co-director with Aisling Chin-Yee of the documentary film No Ordinary Man (2020), and as director of the film Framing Agnes (2022). He won two awards at the 2022 Sundance Film Festival for his work on the latter.

== Filmmaking ==
Joynt has directed a number of feature and short documentary films, and has worked in fiction filmmaking as well. He won the Emerging Canadian Artist award at the 2012 Inside Out Film and Video Festival for Akin; in the same year, he had an acting role in John Greyson's web series Murder in Passing.

In 2020 he received a grant from Inside Out's Re:Focus Emergency Relief Fund for the completion of a feature film edition of Framing Agnes, which later premiered at the 2022 Sundance Film Festival, where Joynt won both the Audience Award and the Innovator Prize in the NEXT program. In 2023, the film was part of the keynote event for the Moving Trans History Forward conference at the University of Victoria, which included a public screening of Framing Agnes and a panel discussion with Jen Richards, Jules Gill-Peterson, Morgan M Page, and Joynt himself.

=== No Ordinary Man ===
Co-directed with Aisling Chin-Yee, No Ordinary Man was Joynt's first feature film.

No Ordinary Man was presented at Cannes Docs 2020 as part of the Canadian Showcase of Docs-in-Progress and premiered at the Toronto International Film Festival in 2020. IndieWire called the film "an elegant riff on a classic progression that arrives at something transcendent."

=== Framing Agnes ===
Expanding on his 2019 short film of the same name, Framing Agnes was Joynt's second feature film. After discovering case files from a 1950s gender clinic, a cast of trans actors turn a talk show inside out to confront the legacy of a young trans woman forced to choose between honesty and access. Agnes, the pseudonymized transgender woman who participated in Harold Garfinkel's gender health research at UCLA in the 1960s, has stood as a figure in trans history.

Sundance Film Festival said of the film: "Joynt's signature form-rupturing style radically reenvisions the imposition of the frame on the cultural memory of transness through his brilliantly crafted, communally-driven excavation. This reclamation tears away with remarkable precision the myth of isolation as the mode of existence of transgender history-makers, breathing new life into a lineage of collaborators and conspirators who have been forgotten for far too long."

Framing Agnes won both the Next Innovator Award and the Audience Award from the 2022 Sundance Film Festival.

=== Two Sentence Horror Stories ===
Alongside documentary features, Joynt has also directed an episode of Two Sentence Horror Stories (produced by The CW and available on Netflix) about a young transgender boy who is being bullied in high school. Joynt's episode was featured as part of an Emmy Awards campaign by Warner Bros. and TheWrap and won a Telly Award for Directing in 2022. That same year, Joynt was awarded the Dream Maker Award by the Cleveland International Film Festival, which recognized a "trailblazing director in contemporary LGBTQ cinema."

=== The Nest ===
Made in collaboration with Julietta Singh and The National Film Board of Canada, The Nest is a feature-length documentary directed by Joynt. At the end of her mother's life, decolonial writer Julietta Singh returns to her childhood home in Manitoba, where her mother had lived for decades, following a serious health crisis. As she investigates the history of the house, she uncovers generations of women connected to it, including figures who confronted colonialism, racism, sexism, and ableism.

=== State of Firsts ===
State of Firsts is a 2025 feature-length documentary that follows U.S. Representative Sarah McBride during her historic campaign and election as the first openly transgender member of the United States Congress. Filmed with immersive, behind-the-scenes access, the film captures McBride's navigation of political life amid public scrutiny, opposition, and the broader challenges of representation in contemporary American politics. The documentary also explores the personal and institutional pressures of being a "first," including a featured conversation between McBride and Representative Alexandria Ocasio-Cortez on visibility, expectations, and political identity.

State of Firsts premiered at the 2025 Tribeca Festival. It will be presented in the Queer Cinema Today section of the 37th Palm Springs International Film Festival on January 2, 2026.

=== Short films ===
Joynt's short films have screened internationally, winning the Jury Award for Best Documentary (Bengaluru), Jury Award for Best Short (Ecuador), Jury Award for Most Promising Filmmaker (Regent Park), Audience Award for Best Documentary Short (Seattle) and the EP Canada/ Canada Film Capital Award for Emerging Canadian Artist (Toronto), Best Experimental Short (Los Angeles), Juror Award (Ann Arbor, Michigan), Audience Award for Best Documentary Short (Seattle).

Joynt's most well-known short films include Framing Agnes, Between You and Me, Genderize, I'm Yours, and Akin. The feature-length version of Framing Agnes is based on a short film of the same name (co-directed with Kristen Schilt) that premiered at the 2019 Tribeca Festival. Between You and Me (2016) interrogates the intersectional relationship between moral panics, desire, and identity through dialogue with the daughter of a pastor who is currently incarcerated for child sexual abuse. Shot over five years, Genderize (2016) captures a buoyant cohort of three siblings as they navigate gender, puberty and parents in a rapidly changing cultural environment. Both Between You and Me and Genderize were acquired for online distribution by the Canadian Broadcasting Corporation. I'm Yours (2012) satirically responds to the pressure placed on transitioning subjects to answer endless, invasive questions about their identities by the media. Akin (2012) reckons with legacies of intergenerational sexual violence through shared kinship between Joynt's decision to transition and his mother's conversion to Orthodox Judaism.

=== Level Ground Productions ===
Level Ground Productions is co-run by Samantha Curley and Chase Joynt, and is a 501(c)(3) organization non-profit of the same name. Level Ground is a documentary production company exploring the edges of genre and story. Notable films include Union (2024), which won a Special Jury award for the Art of Change at the Sundance Film Festival and was shortlisted for the Oscars, and Framing Agnes (2022) which won the NEXT Innovator Award and Audience Award at the Sundance Film Festival and the GLAAD Media Award for Outstanding Documentary.

== Writing ==
In 2016, Joynt and Mike Hoolboom coauthored the non-fiction book You Only Live Twice: Sex, Death and Transition. In this genre-transcending book, trans writer and media artist Chase Joynt and HIV-positive movie artist Mike Hoolboom come together over the films of Chris Marker to exchange transition tales, confessional missives that map out the particularities of occupying what they call 'second lives': Chase's transition from female to male and Mike's near-death from AIDS. Weaving cultural theory with memoir and media analysis, YOLT asks intimate questions about what it might mean to find love and hope through conversation across generations. The book received a Lambda Literary Award nomination for Transgender Non-Fiction at the 29th Lambda Literary Awards in 2017.

In September 2024, Joynt published his third book, titled Vantage Points: On Media as Trans Memoir. Following the death of the family patriarch, a box of newly procured family documents reveals writer-filmmaker Chase Joynt's previously unknown connection to Canadian media maverick Marshall McLuhan. Vantage Points takes up the surprising appearance of McLuhan in Joynt's family archive as a way to think about legacies of childhood sexual abuse and how we might process and represent them. Joynt writes about difficult pasts and connects them to contemporary politics and ways of being, employing McLuhan's seminal Understanding Media as an inciting framework. Vantage Points is a kaleidoscopic reckoning with the impact of media and masculinity on the stories we tell about ourselves and our families, a unique and highly visual approach to trans life writing, and an experimental move between gender and genre. For this work, Joynt received a nomination for the Hilary Weston Writers' Trust Prize for Nonfiction.

== Teaching ==
The opening of Joynt's self-description on the University of Victoria website reads: "After seeing my work in public, people often ask: "Are you a film person invested in gender theory or a gender studies person who also makes films?" The boundaries, investments and tensions revealed by these questions are emblematic of my interdisciplinary artistic practice and scholarly pursuits." After his Bachelor of Arts at the University of California, Los Angeles and his Master of Arts at York University, in 2016 Joynt obtained his PhD in Cinema and Media Studies from York University. Since 2019, Joynt has been an assistant professor of gender studies at the University of Victoria. Rooted in collaborative, practice-based research, Joynt's classes meet at the intersection of cultural productions and Gender Studies.

== Personal life ==
Joynt is a trans man.
