= 2nd Canadian Screen Awards =

2014 awards given by the Academy of Canadian Cinema & Television

- Date: March 9, 2014
- Location: Sony Centre for the Performing Arts, Toronto
- Hosted by: Martin Short

Highlights
- Most awards: Film: Enemy & The Mortal Instruments: City of Bones (5); TV: Orphan Black (10)
- Most nominations: Film: Enemy (10); TV: Orphan Black (14)
- Best Motion Picture: Gabrielle
- Best Dramatic Series: Orphan Black
- Best Comedy Series: Call Me Fitz

Television/radio coverage
- Network: CBC

The 2nd Canadian Screen Awards were held on March 9, 2014, to honour achievements in Canadian film, television, and digital media production in 2013. Awards in technical and some other categories were presented in a series of advance ceremonies during the week of March 3 to 8.

Nominations were announced on January 13, 2014. In film categories, Denis Villeneuve's Enemy led with 10 nominations, while in the television categories, the science fiction series Orphan Black received 14 nominations.

The awards ceremony were hosted by Martin Short for the second time, at the Sony Centre for the Performing Arts in Toronto, Ontario, and marked the 65th anniversary of the creation of the original Canadian Film Awards.

== Film ==
Motion Picture	Direction
Gabrielle — Kim McCraw, Luc Déry; The Dismantling (Le Démantèlement) — Bernadette Payeur, Marc Daigle; Empire of Dirt — Jennifer Podemski; Enemy — Kim McCraw, Luc Déry, Miguel A. Faura, Niv Fichman, Sari Friedland; The F Word — André Rouleau, David Gross, Macdara Kelleher; The Grand Seduction — Roger Frappier, Barbara Doran; Maïna — Karine Martin, Michel Poulette, Yves Fortin; Tom at the Farm (Tom à la ferme) — Charles Gillibert, Nathanaël Karmitz, Xavier Dolan	Denis Villeneuve, Enemy; Xavier Dolan, Tom at the Farm (Tom à la ferme); Michael Dowse, The F Word; Sébastien Pilote, The Dismantling (Le Démantèlement); Pedro Pires and Robert Lepage, Triptych (Triptyque)
Actor in a leading role	Actress in a leading role
Gabriel Arcand, The Dismantling (Le Démantèlement); Brendan Gleeson, The Grand Seduction; Jake Gyllenhaal, Enemy; Daniel Radcliffe, The F Word; Rajesh Tailang, Siddharth	Gabrielle Marion-Rivard, Gabrielle; Cara Gee, Empire of Dirt; Isabelle Guérard, Rouge sang; Kawennáhere Devery Jacobs, Rhymes for Young Ghouls; Tatiana Maslany, Cas & Dylan
Actor in a supporting role	Actress in a supporting role
Gordon Pinsent, The Grand Seduction; Jay Baruchel, The Art of the Steal; Pierre-Yves Cardinal, Tom at the Farm (Tom à la ferme); Marc Labrèche, Whitewash; Alexandre Landry, Gabrielle	Sarah Gadon, Enemy; Florence Blain Mbaye, Another House (L'autre maison); Evelyne Brochu, Tom at the Farm (Tom à la ferme); Mackenzie Davis, The F Word; Jennifer Podemski, Empire of Dirt
Original Screenplay	Adapted Screenplay
Shannon Masters, Empire of Dirt; Emanuel Hoss-Desmarais and Marc Tulin, Whitewash; Richie Mehta, Siddharth; Sébastien Pilote, The Dismantling (Le Démantèlement); Jonathan Sobol, The Art of the Steal	Elan Mastai, The F Word; Michel Marc Bouchard and Xavier Dolan, Tom at the Farm (Tom à la ferme); Javier Gullón, Enemy; Robert Lepage, Triptych (Triptyque); Ken Scott and Michael Dowse, The Grand Seduction
Feature Length Documentary	Short Documentary
Jennifer Baichwal and Edward Burtynsky, Watermark; Alanis Obomsawin, Hi-Ho Mistahey!; Chelsea McMullan, My Prairie Home; Joel Heath, People of a Feather; Stephen A. Smith and Julia Szucs, Vanishing Point	Anne Wheeler, Yves J. Ma and Tracey Friesen, Chi; Andrew Moir, Just As I Remember; Sam Decoste and Annette Clarke, Mary & Myself
Best Live Action Short Drama	Best Animated Short
Patrick Cederberg and Walter Woodman, Noah; Jean-François Asselin, Remember Me (Mémorable moi); Anaïs Barbeau-Lavalette and André Turpin, Ina Litovski; Johnny Ma, A Grand Canal; Stéphane Moukarzel, Time Flies (Nous avions)	Chris Landreth, Marcy Page and Mark Smith, Subconscious Password; Bruce Alcock, Annette Clarke, Michael Fukushima and Tina Ouellette, Impromptu; Claire Blanchet and Michael Fukushima, The End of Pinky; Michelle Kranot, Uri Kranot, Dora Benousilio, Marc Bertrand and Marie Bro, Hollow Land; Theodore Ushev and Marc Bertrand, Gloria Victoria
Art Direction/Production Design	Cinematography
Michel Proulx, Louis Cyr; Jean Bécotte, Maïna; Mario Hervieux, The Dismantling (Le Démantèlement); Anthony Ianni and François Séguin, The Mortal Instruments: City of Bones; Patrice Vermette, Enemy	Nicolas Bolduc, Enemy; François Delisle, The Meteor (Le Météore); Pierre Gill, Upside Down; Antonio Riestra, Mama; Allen Smith, Maïna
Costume Design	Editing
Carmen Alie, Louis Cyr; Lea Carlson, The Colony; Véronique Marchessault, Maïna; Sarah Millman, Molly Maxwell; Gersha Phillips, The Mortal Instruments: City of Bones	Matthew Hannam, Enemy; Carina Baccanale, Amsterdam; Richard Comeau, Gabrielle; Evan Morgan and Matt Johnson, The Dirties; Jorge Weisz, Empire of Dirt
Overall Sound	Sound Editing
Andrew Tay, David Drage, David Giammarco, Greg Chapman, Matt McKenzie and Peter Persaud, The Mortal Instruments: City of Bones; Arnaud Derimay, Benoît Leduc and Stéphane Bergeron, Amsterdam; Bernard Gariépy Strobl and Pierre Bertrand, Gabrielle; Joe Morrow, Lalit Malik and Lou Solakofski, Siddharth; François Grenon, Olivier Goinard, Sevan Koryan and Sylvain Brassard, Tom at the Farm (Tom à la ferme)	Alex Bullick, Christian Schaaning, J.R. Fountain, Jill Purdy, Kevin Banks, Nathan Robitaille, Nelson Ferreira, Stephen Barden and Steve Baine, The Mortal Instruments: City of Bones; Sylvain Bellemare, Gabrielle; Guy Francoeur, Isabelle Favreau and Sylvain Brassard, Tom at the Farm (Tom à la ferme); Antoine Morin, Christian Rivest, Guy Pelletier, Martin Pinsonnault, Mireille Morin and Paul Col, Louis Cyr
Achievement in Music: Original Score	Achievement in Music: Original Song
Danny Bensi and Saunder Jurriaans, Enemy; Ramachandra Borcar, Rock Paper Scissors (Roche papier ciseaux); Michel Cusson, Rouge sang; Kim Gaboury and Michel Cusson, Maïna; Gabriel Yared, Tom at the Farm (Tom à la ferme)	Jimmy Harry and Serena Ryder, "It's No Mistake" (The Right Kind of Wrong); Michel Cusson, "À la claire fontaine" (Rouge sang); Maerin Hunting, "Iva/Moses" (Stay); Elisapie Isaac, "Far Away" (The Legend of Sarila); Colleen Rennison, "Molly" (Down River)
Make-Up	Visual Effects
Jo-Ann Macneil, Karola Dirnberger and Paul Jones, The Mortal Instruments: City of Bones; Brigitte Bilodeau, Maïna; François Dagenais and Traci Loader, Cottage Country; Louise Mackintosh, Peggy Kyriakidou and Shauna Llewellyn, The Colony; David Martí, Linda Dowds and Montse Ribé, Mama	Andy Robinson, Dennis Berardi, Edward J. Taylor IV, James Cooper, Jason Edwardh, Jo Hughes, Leann Harvey, Sean Mills, Stephen Wagner and Trey Harrell, The Mortal Instruments: City of Bones; Laetitia Séguin, Marie-Cecile Dahan, Mathieu Veillette, Matthew Rouleau, Mikael Damant-Sirois, Patrick David and Vincent Poitras, Enemy; Aélis Héraud, Antoine Wibaut, Catherine Hébert, Cyntha Carrier, David Raymond, Jonathan Legris, Josée Chapdelaine, Louis-Alexandre Lord, Pierre-Simon Lebrun-Chaput and Sarah Neveu, Louis Cyr; Aaron Weintraub, Ayo Burgess, Dennis Berardi, Edward J. Taylor IV, Jason Gougeon, Kyle Yoneda, Michael Borrett, Michael Rice, Sarah McMurdo and Tamara Stone, Mama; Annie Normandin, Dominic Daigle, François Dumoulin, Marc Morissette and Olivier Goulet, Upside Down
Claude Jutra Award	Golden Reel Award
Emanuel Hoss-Desmarais, Whitewash	The Mortal Instruments: City of Bones

== Television ==
=== Programs ===
Drama series	Comedy series
Orphan Black; Blackstone; Bomb Girls; Flashpoint; Motive	Call Me Fitz; Gavin Crawford's Wild West; Mr. D; Seed; Tiny Plastic Men
Best Animated Program or Series	Dramatic Mini-Series or TV Movie
Almost Naked Animals; Fugget About It; The Magic Hockey Skates; Sidekick; Slugterra	Borealis; The Horses of McBride; Mr. Hockey: The Gordie Howe Story; Time of Death
Children's or youth fiction	Children's or youth non-fiction
Degrassi; Alive; Life With Boys; Mr. Young; The Next Step	Splatalot!; Cross Country Fun Hunt; Extreme Babysitting; Finding Stuff Out 2; The Next Star
Documentary Program	Documentary Series
The Defector: Escape from North Korea; The Gimli Glider: 30 Years Later; Hockey Migrations; Ice, Sweat and Tears; West Wind: The Vision of Tom Thomson	Engraved on a Nation; Alex Tagliani: The Man, the Athlete; The Beat; Ice Pilots NWT
International Drama	Lifestyle Program or Series
The Borgias; Vikings; World Without End	You Gotta Eat Here!; Chuck's Week Off: Mexico; Income Property; Pitchin' In; Steven and Chris
Variety or Sketch Comedy Program or Series	Performing Arts or Arts Documentary Program or Series
Rick Mercer Report; 20th Annual Indspire Awards; Funny as Hell; Just for Laughs All Access: The Muppets All-Star Comedy Gala; This Hour Has 22 Minutes	I Am Not a Rock Star; The Real Sherlock Holmes
Pre-School Program or Series	Reality/Competition Program or Series
Justin Time; Monster Math Squad; Rob the Robot; Tumbletown Tales	Dragons' Den; Canada's Greatest Know-It-All; Canada's Handyman Challenge; Intervention Canada; Top Chef Canada
Science or Nature Documentary Program or Series	Social/Political Documentary Program (Donald Brittain Award)
Aliens: The Definitive Guide; The Nature of Things: "The Beaver Whisperers"; The Nature of Things: "Lights Out!"; Doc Zone: "Wind Rush"	The People of the Kattawapiskak River; Blood Relative; Herman's House
Sports Program or Series	Factual Program or Series
100th Grey Cup Pre-Game Show; 4 Days in April: The Mike Weir Story; MLB Central	Museum Secrets; Don't Drive Here; Yukon Gold; Never Ever Do This At Home; Strip the City
Music Program or Series	History or Biography Documentary Program or Series
2013 MuchMusic Video Awards; CMT Presents Dean Brody; God's Greatest Hits; 2013 Juno Awards; Much Presents We Day 2012	The Real Inglorious Bastards; Engraved on a Nation (episode "The 13th Man"); Engraved on a Nation (episode "Stone Thrower: The Chuck Ealey Story"); Perfect Storms; We Were Children
Diversity Award	Fan Choice Award for Favourite Canadian Show
The Defector: Escape from North Korea	Lost Girl
Gordon Sinclair Award
W5

=== Actors ===
Lead actor, drama	Lead actress, drama
Hugh Dillon, Flashpoint; François Arnaud, The Borgias; Ben Bass, Rookie Blue; Sam Huntington, Being Human; David Sutcliffe, Cracked	Tatiana Maslany, Orphan Black; Hélène Joy, Murdoch Mysteries; Michelle Thrush, Blackstone; Meg Tilly, Bomb Girls; Katheryn Winnick, Vikings
Lead actor, comedy	Lead actress, comedy
Jason Priestley, Call Me Fitz; Jesse Camacho, Less Than Kind; Gavin Crawford, Gavin Crawford's Wild West; Gerry Dee, Mr. D; Ron James, The Ron James Show	Tracy Dawson, Call Me Fitz; Wendel Meldrum, Less Than Kind; Carrie-Lynn Neales, Seed; Nancy Sorel, Less Than Kind
Lead actor, television film or miniseries	Lead actress, television film or miniseries
Rick Roberts, Jack; Gary Cole, An Officer and a Murderer; Tyler Johnston, The Phantoms; Michael Shanks, Mr. Hockey: The Gordie Howe Story	Sook-Yin Lee, Jack; Mia Kirshner, I Think I Do; Jessica Lowndes, A Mother's Nightmare; Kathleen Robertson, Mr. Hockey: The Gordie Howe Story
Supporting actor, drama	Supporting actress, drama
Jordan Gavaris, Orphan Black; Sergio Di Zio, Flashpoint; Matt Gordon, Rookie Blue; Kevin Hanchard, Orphan Black; Michael Mando, Orphan Black	Maria Doyle Kennedy, Orphan Black; Claudia Black, Haven; Priscilla Faia, Rookie Blue; Cheri Maracle, Blackstone; Luvia Petersen, Continuum
Supporting actor, comedy	Supporting actress, comedy
Nicholas Campbell, Less Than Kind; Andrew Cheng, Gavin Crawford's Wild West; Colin Cunningham, Less Than Kind; Tyler Johnston, Less Than Kind; Pat Thornton, Satisfaction	Nikki Payne, Satisfaction; Laura de Carteret, Seed; Quancetia Hamilton, Call Me Fitz; Bette MacDonald, Mr. D; Amy Sloan, Call Me Fitz
Performance, animation	Performance, children's or youth
Seán Cullen, Almost Naked Animals: "Laugh Piggy Laugh"; Ted Atherton, Fugget About It: "The Full Mountie"; David Berni, Rocket Monkeys: "Scarelicious"; Mark Edwards, Rocket Monkeys: "Monkey See Monkey Do Better"; Paul Soles, Detentionaire: "Finding Finnwich"	Dylan Everett, Degrassi: "Bitter Sweet Symphony, Part One"; Munro Chambers, Degrassi: "Ray of Light, Part Two"; Dylan Everett, Wingin' It: "Forget About It"; Brendan Meyer, Mr. Young: "Mr. Time"; Michael Murphy, Life with Boys: "Young and Stupid with Boys"
Performance, guest role in a drama	Performance, variety or sketch comedy
Natalie Lisinska, Orphan Black: "Variations Under Domestication"; Shawn Doyle, Flashpoint: "No Kind of Life"; Michael Mando, Rookie Blue: "The Kids Are Not Alright"; Molly Parker, Motive: "Public Enemy"; Rick Roberts, Cracked: "How the Light Gets In"	Rick Mercer, Rick Mercer Report; Michael Bublé, Juno Awards of 2013; Kellylee Evans, Studio 14 Sessions; Psy, 2013 MuchMusic Video Awards; A Tribe Called Red, 20th Annual Indspire Awards
Best Host in a Pre-School, Children's or Youth Program or Series	Host in a Variety, Lifestyle, Reality/Competition, Performing Arts or Talk Program or Series
Carlos Bustamante, The Next Star: "Auditions Part 3"; Andrew Chapman, Extreme Babysitting; Bradford How, The Grizzly Cup: "Part 1"	Michael Bublé, Juno Awards of 2013; Arisa Cox, Big Brother Canada; Lynn Crawford, Pitchin' In; Tracy Moore, CityLine; Andrew Younghusband, Don't Drive Here

=== News and information ===
News reportage, national	News reportage, local
Sasa Petricic (CBC News), Syrian Conflict; Alanna Satur, David Brunet and Geneviève Beauchemin (CTV News), Lac-Mégantic derailment; Robert Fife (CTV News), Canadian Senate expenses scandal	David Cochrane and Paul Pickett, CBC News: Here and Now; Elizabeth Chiu, CBC News: Nova Scotia at Six; Anu Singh and Nil Köksal, CBC News: Toronto; Gosia Sawicka, Joanne Levasseur and Leif Larsen, CBC News: Winnipeg; Avery Haines, Josef Fazio and Shayla Vize, CityNews
National newscast	Local newscast
CTV National News; CBC News: The National; Global National	CityNews; CBC News Nova Scotia at Six; CBC News Toronto; CTV News Toronto at Six; Global News Calgary
News anchor, national	News anchor, local
Lisa LaFlamme, CTV National News; Dawna Friesen, Global National; Peter Mansbridge, CBC News: The National	Ken Shaw, CTV News Toronto; Anne-Marie Mediwake, CBC News Toronto; Leslie Roberts, Global News Toronto; Janet Stewart, CBC News Winnipeg
News information program	News information series
Doc Zone — "Syria: Behind Rebel Lines"; The Fifth Estate — "Into the Death Zone"; Focus Ontario — "Epilepsy"; W5 — "The Throwaway Children"	the fifth estate; 16:9; Marketplace; W5
News special	Host or Interviewer in a News Information Program or Series
The National, "Boston Marathon Bombing Suspect Arrested"; Global News Calgary, "Calgary Flood"; CTV Vancouver, "2013 Election"; CP24, "Ontario Liberal Convention"	Peter Keleghan, Doc Zone: "The War of 1812: Been There, Won That"; Erica Johnson, Marketplace; Victor Malarek, The Throwaway Children; Peter Mansbridge, Mansbridge One on One; Evan Solomon, Power & Politics

=== Sports ===
Live sports event	Sports analysis
100th Grey Cup; 2013 Tim Hortons Brier; 2013 NHL Playoffs, Round 1: Boston Bruins vs. Toronto Maple Leafs	Glen Suitor, 100th Grey Cup; Glenn Healy, 2013 NHL Playoffs, Round 1: Boston Bruins vs. Toronto Maple Leafs; Craig Simpson, 2013 NHL Playoffs, Round 1: Boston Bruins vs. Toronto Maple Leafs; Gregg Zaun, Blue Jays Central
Sports host	Sports play-by-play
James Duthie, NHL Season Brink: Game On; Ron Maclean, 2013 Calgary Stampede; Rod Smith, SportsCentre	Jim Hughson, 2013 Stanley Cup Finals: Game 4, Chicago Black Hawks vs. Boston Bruins; Chris Cuthbert, 100th Grey Cup
Sports feature segment
Marc LeBlanc, Paul Sidhu and Stephen Brunt, "Carver High" (Sportsnet); Ben Shannon, Paul Sidhu and Stephen Brunt, "One Game, One Hundred Seasons" (Sportsnet); Paul Sidhu and Stephen Brunt, "Timeless" (Sportsnet); James Duthie, Ken Volden and Matt Cade, "The Hangover" (TSN); Ken Volden and Ross Rheaume, "Hank Ilesic" (TSN)

=== Direction ===
Animated Program or Series	Children's or Youth Program or Series
Jason Boose and Sarah Mercey, The Magic Hockey Skates; Kevin Micallef, Detentionaire: "Finding Finnwich"; Matt Ferguson, Scaredy Squirrel: "Store Trek/Safety Corner Conundrum"; Kerry Sargent, Sidekick: "Black Top, Dark Matter/Master XOX Ray Vision"; Clint Butler, Slugterra: "What Lies Beneath"	Stefan Brogren, Degrassi: "Time of My Life"; Randall "RT!" Thorne, ALIVE; Jesse Shamata and Rae Upton, The Grizzly Cup: "Part 1"; Samir Rehem, The Next Step: "Sabotage"; Derby Crewe, Wingin' It: "Live and Let Fly"
Comedy Program or Series	Documentary Program
Kelly Makin, Less Than Kind: "Fight and Flight"; Jacob Tierney, Gavin Crawford's Wild West; Steve Wright, Mr. D: "Overnight Trip"; Jason Priestley, Satisfaction: "Save the Date"; James Genn, Seed: "Ill Conceived"	Ann Shin, The Defector: Escape from North Korea; Nimisha Mukerji, Blood Relative; Bobbi Jo Hart, I Am Not a Rock Star; Alanis Obomsawin, The People of the Kattawapiskak River; Min Sook Lee, The Real Inglorious Bastards
Documentary Series	Dramatic Program or Miniseries
Barry Stevens, War Story: "Ortona: The War Inside"; John Driftmier and Matthew Shewchuk, Highway Thru Hell: "No Tears in Towing"; Joshua Eady, Boundless: "Cambodia/Spider Bites"; P. J. Naworynski, Air Aces: "Red Tails"; Ian Toews, Untamed Gourmet: "Prince Edward Island Lobster"	Sudz Sutherland, The Phantoms; David Frazee, Borealis; Andy Mikita, Mr. Hockey: The Gordie Howe Story; Anne Wheeler, The Horses of McBride
Drama Series	Lifestyle/Practical Information Program or Series
John Fawcett, Orphan Black - "Endless Forms Most Beautiful"; Ken Girotti, Vikings: "The Sacrifice"; Bronwen Hughes, Motive: "Creeping Tom"; Bruce McDonald, Cracked: "What We Can't See"; Kari Skogland, The Borgias: "The Face of Death"	Jim Morrison, You Gotta Eat Here!: "American Cheesesteak"; Harvey Crossland, The Chef's Domain: "St John's, NL: Chef Jeremy Charles"; Joshua Dorsey, Nadia G's Bitchin' Kitchen: "Halloween Special"; Megan McCoy, Money Moron: "Ryan and Lisetty"; Candy Signorini, CityLine: "Cityline's Ultimate Holiday Guide"
Live Sporting Event	Reality/Competition Series
Paul Hemming, 100th Grey Cup; Ron Forsythe, 2013 Stanley Cup playoffs: "Game 1, Leafs/Bruins"	Graeme Lynch, Undercover Boss Canada: "PJ Pets"; Joseph Blasioli, Canada's Handyman Challenge: "Calling Vancouver"; Fred Frame and Mark Lawrence, The Liquidator: "Bricks and Mortals"; Catharine Parke, Get Stuffed: "Redneck Games"; Mark Stevenson, Nerve Center: 100th Grey Cup
Variety or Sketch Comedy Program or Series
Henry Sarwer-Foner, Rick Mercer Report: "Episode 10"; Trevor Grant, The Candy Show: "Small Spaces, Familiar Faces"; Rob Lindsay, Royal Canadian Air Farce: "Air Farce New Years Eve 2012"; Shelagh O'Brien, Just for Laughs: All Access: "The Muppets All-Star Comedy Gala"; Rae Upton, Indspire Awards

=== Craft ===
Editorial research	Visual research
Amber Hildebrandt, Anita Elash, Kimberly Ivany, Romilla Karnick, Sangeeta Patel and Sina Zapfe, The Fifth Estate: "Rate My Hospital"; Maya Gallus, The Mystery of Mazo de la Roche; Carolyn Jacob and Zachary Frank, Perfect Storms: "Dark Age Volcano"; Nancy Lang and Rebecca Middleton, West Wind: The Vision of Tom Thomson; Benjamin Tucker, Museum Secrets: "Inside the Israel Museum, Jerusalem"	Elizabeth Klinck, Quality Balls: The David Steinberg Story; Erin Chisholm, The Mystery of Mazo de la Roche; Erin Chisholm, War Story: "Ortona: The War Inside"; Elspeth Domville and Paul Patskou, Engraved on a Nation: "The Photograph"
Make-Up	Costume Design
Edwina Voda and Erik Gosselin, Being Human: "Always a Bridesmaid, Never Alive"; Eva Coudouloux and Katarina Chovanec, Bomb Girls: "Where There's Smoke"; Deb Drennan, Murdoch Mysteries: "Victoria Cross"; Brenda Magalas and Doug Morrow, Jack; Colleen Quinton, Julia Valente, Anna Tesner, Balázs Novák, World Without End: "Rook"	Debra Hanson, Bomb Girls: "Party Line"; Mario Davignon, World Without End: "Pawns"; Laurie Drew, Orphan Black: "Instinct"; Delphine White, Copper: "The Hudson River School"; Steven Wright, Haven: "Sarah"
Photography in a comedy series	Photography in a documentary program or series
Michael Marshall, Less Than Kind: "Fight and Flight"; Thom Best, Mr. D: "Overnight Trip"; Ian Bibby, Call Me Fitz: "Apoca' Smokes Now"; David Makin, Seed: "Ill Conceived"	Jeremy Benning and Kim Bell, We Were Children; Stan Barua, The Mystery of Mazo de la Roche; John Price, Stone Thrower: The Chuck Ealey Story; Yanick Rose, 1000 Days for the Planet: "Great Oceanic Migrators"; John Westheuser and Neville Ottey, The West Wind: The Vision of Tom Thomson
Photography in a drama program or series	Photography in a lifestyle or reality program or series
Aaron Morton, Orphan Black: "Endless Forms Most Beautiful"; John Bartley, Vikings: "A King's Ransom"; Éric Cayla, Bomb Girls: "Fifth Column"; Jon Joffin, Ring of Fire; Paul Sarossy, The Borgias: "The Prince"	Peter Rieveshl and Ryan Shaw, The Amazing Race Canada: "Where in the World Is Ogopogo?"; Geoff Lackner, Don't Drive Here: "Lima"; Allan Leader, Hail Mary: "Open Tryout Cincinnati"; Alex Nadon and Geoffrey Denham, Top Chef Canada: "Restaurant Wars"; Sean White and Simon Schneider, Yukon Gold: "Sluice or Die"
Photography in a variety or performing arts program or series	Editing in a comedy, variety or performing arts program or series
David Fairfield and James Downey, 2013 MuchMusic Video Awards; Scott Imler, CMT Presents Paul Brandt Just As I Am; Alex Nadon, Juno Awards of 2013; Kiarash Sadigh, God's Greatest Hits: "Nearer My God to Thee & Songs of the Sea"; Don Spence, Rick Mercer Report; "Episode 7"	Paul Winestock, Less Than Kind: "Before the End Begins"; Benjamin Duffield, Seed: "Zygote Problems"; Kimberlee McTaggart, Call Me Fitz: "Are You There God? I Need to Speak to Frank"; Kimberlee McTaggart, Seed: "Birth of a Salesman"; Craig Webster, Satisfaction: "First Contact"
Editing in a documentary program or series	Editing in a dramatic program or series
Howard Goldberg, I Am Not a Rock Star; Ricardo Acosta, Herman's House; Dave Kazala, The Real Inglorious Bastards; Mark Ratzlaff, Blood Relative; Gil Tetreault, Doc Zone: "Faking the Grade"	D. Gillian Truster, Orphan Black: "Unconscious Selection"; Christopher Donaldson, Flashpoint: "Broken Peace"; Teresa Hannigan, Rookie Blue: "Poison Pill"; Aaron Marshall, Vikings: "A King's Ransom"; Stein Myhrstad, Motive: "Creeping Tom"
Editing in an information program or series	Editing in a reality/competition program or series
Graeme Ball, Museum Secrets: "Inside the National Maritime Museum, London"; Wade Carson, Decked Out: "The Do-Over Deck"; Kris Fleerackers, CBC News: The National: "The Enablers"; Dave Goard, Holmes Makes It Right: "Caught in a Trap, Part 1"; Neil Sitka, Canada's Worst Driver: "Episode 3"	Aaron Shapero and John Watson, Intervention Canada: "Tammy"; Craig Bateman, Dean Davis, Ilan Doitch and John Reynolds, Canada's Handyman Challenge: "Challenging Halifax"; Chris Bizzocchi, The Liquidator: "Bricks and Mortals"; Nathan Shields, Disaster Decks: "The Deck Anne Hates"; Steve Taylor, Canada's Greatest Know-It-All: "Murderous Race to Win"
Production design/art direction in a fiction program or series	Production design/art direction in a non-fiction program or series
Andy Loew and Ian Brock, Orphan Black: "Conditions of Existence"; Anthony Ianni, Gordon Sim and John Blackie, Copper: "The Hudson River School"; Bill Ives, Louise Middleton and Paul Healy, Borealis; Mary Kirkland, Rupert Lazarus and Sean Breaugh, Satisfaction: "First Contract"; Benno Tutter and Bruce Mailing, Saving Hope: "The Face of the Giant Panda"	Michael "Spike" Parks, 2013 MuchMusic Video Awards; Andrew Berry and Jack Babcock, Perfect Storms: "God's Wrath"; Peter Faragher and Sandra Svendsen, Big Brother Canada: "Evil Dead"; Dareck Gorecki, Brainwashed: "Seven Year Slave"; Gordon Wilding, We Were Children
Sound in a Comedy, Variety, Performing Arts or Animated Program or Series	Sound in a Dramatic Program or Series
Doug McClement, Howard Baggley, Marc Laliberté, Michael Molineux and Simon Bowers, Juno Awards of 2013; Alexis Eskandari, Allen Ormerod, Fred Brennan, Matthew Harrold, Paul Shikata, Steve Ejbick and Susan Fawcett, Call Me Fitz: "Apoca' Smokes Now"; Gary Vaughan, Marcone, Richard Spence--Thomas and Steve Bigas, God's Greatest Hits: "The British Invasion: Jerusalem and the English Hymn"; Andrew McDonnell, Brian Fraser, Glenn Barna and John Bakti, Sidekick: "Eric of the Board/Pamp My Ride"; Dean Giammarco, Gordon Sproule, Jeff Davis and Jonny Ludgate, Slugterra: "The World Beneath Our Feet, Part 1"	Andrew Jablonski, Andy Malcolm, Brent Pickett, Dale Sheldrake, David McCallum, Goro Koyama, Jane Tattersall, Jenna Dalla Riva, Kirk Lynds, Martin Gwynn Jones, Martin Lee and Yuri Gorbachow, The Borgias: "The Face of Death"; Al deGraff, Erik Culp, Janice Ierulli, Joe Mancuso, Mark Shnuriwsky, Matthew Hussey, Mike Woroniuk, Richard Calistan, Steve Hammond and Zenon Waschuk, Flashpoint: "Broken Peace"; Bill McMillan, John Elliot, Kevin Banks, Paul Germann, Steph Carrier, Stephen Traub and Sue Conley, Rookie Blue: "You Can See The Stars"; Bill McMillan, Ian Rankin, John Elliot, Kevin Banks, Martin Lee, Paul Germann and Sue Conley, Saving Hope: "Wishbones"; Colin Ritchie, Dale Sheldrake, Dave Fritz, David McCallum, Erik Culp, Jane Tattersall, Martin Gwynn Jones, Paul Conway, Scott Shepherd, Steve Foster and Steve Ham, World Without End: "King"
Sound in an Information/Documentary or Lifestyle Program or Series	Visual effects
Daniel Pellerin, Howard Rissin, Jeremy MacLaverty, John Sievert, Randy Wilson, Rob Hutchins, Stan Mak and Stefan Fraticelli, We Were Children; Brian Eimer, Jessica Moniz, Josh Vamos, Matthew Vandersluys, Michael Bonini and Nadia Awad, Mayday: "Focused on Failure"; David Midgley, Gabriel Ferreyra, Hazel Burns, Michael Nunan and Steve Denheyer, Alien Mysteries: "Rendlesham Forest"; Toban Mills, Don't Drive Here: "Delhi"; Daniel Pellerin, Geoff Raffan, John Sievert, Matt Chan, Rob Hutchins and Ron Mellegers, Perfect Storms: "America's Deadliest Disaster"	Bill Halliday, Dennis Berardi, Dominic Remane, Jim Maxwell, Julian Parry, Maria Gordon, Michael Borrett, Ovidiu Cinazan, Paul Wishart and Wilson Cameron, Vikings: "Dispossessed"; Aélis Héraud, Benoit Brière, Élaine Phaneuf, Gabriel Morin, Marc-André Poulin, Marie-Ève Bédard-Tremblay, Maxime Entringer, Michael Beaulac, Pierre-Simon Lebrun-Chaput and Vanessa Delarosbil, Being Human: "Always a Bridesmaid, Never Alive"; Adam de Bosch Kemper, Andrew Karr, Brandon Hines, Craig VandenBiggelaar, Jeremy Kehler, Lawren Bancroft-Wilson, Louis Leung, Mark Savela, Toby Taplin and Tom Archer, Primeval: New World: "Angry Birds"; Adam Stern, Brent Veal, Dan Dixon, Elaine Fung, Gordon Oscar, Nadine Blackler, Sean Gilhooly, Sean Muller, Stanislav Enilenis and Youngbin Eun, Continuum: "Second Time"; Adrian Sutherland, Ahmed Shehata, Amanda Lynn Hollingworth, Chris Ankli, James Chretien, Jordan Nieuwland, JP Giamos, Luke Groves, Peter Giliberti and Wojciech Zielinski, The Borgias: "The Prince"
Casting	
Lisa Parasyn and Jon Comerford, Bomb Girls: "Guests of Honour"; Sharon Forrest and Susan Forrest, Rookie Blue: "Friday the 13th"; Sharon Forrest and Susan Forrest, Saving Hope: "I Watch Death"; Jim Heber and Susan Forrest, Less Than Kind: "Fight and Flight"; Marissa Richmond, Flashpoint: "Fit for Duty"

=== Music ===
Music for a non-fiction program or series	Score for a program
John Welsman, West Wind: The Vision of Tom Thomson; Eric Cadesky and Nick Dyer, Museum Secrets: "Inside the Israel Museum, Jerusalem"; Ken Myhr, Herman's House; Ken Myhr, The Real Sherlock Holmes; Daniel Toussaint, March to the Top	Tom Third, Borealis; Jono Grant and Robert Carli, An Officer and a Murderer; Louis Natale, The Horses of McBride; John Rowley, The Phantoms; Rich Walters, Ring of Fire
Score for a series
Robert Carli, Cracked: "What We Can't See"; Serge Côté, Rob the Robot: "Sheriff in Town"; Mychael Danna, World Without End: "Knight"; Gary Koftinoff, Saving Hope: "Wishbones"; Trevor Morris, The Borgias: "The Prince"

=== Writing ===
Children's or Youth	Comedy
Ramona Barckert, Degrassi: "Bitter Sweet Symphony, Part Two"; Lisa Hunter, Finding Stuff Out: "Solids, Liquid & Gases"; Terry McGurrin, Scaredy Squirrel: "Safety Corner Conundrum"; Claire Ross Dunn, Wingin' It: "Total Debate of the Heart"; Steve Westren, Almost Naked Animals: "Sun Scream"	Gavin Crawford and Kyle Tingley, Gavin Crawford's Wild West; Garry Campbell and Mark McKinney, Less Than Kind: "Fight and Flight"; Jenn Engels, Satisfaction: "Penis Face Cat Funeral"; Chris Sheasgreen and Marvin Kaye, Less Than Kind: "I'm Only Nineteen"; Joseph Raso, Seed: "Ill Conceived"
Documentary	Dramatic Program or Miniseries
Susan Teskey, Doc Zone: "The War of 1812: Been There, Won That"; Catherine Bainbridge, Howard Goldberg and Jeff Dorn, Smoke Traders; Bob McKeown, The Fifth Estate: "Into the Death Zone"; Mark Miller, Highway Thru Hell: "Death on the Coq"; Larry Raskin, Ice Pilots NWT: "Crash Landing"	Andrew Rai Berzins and Andrew Wreggitt, Borealis; Keith Ross Leckie, An Officer and a Murderer; James Phillips, Willed to Kill; Anne Wheeler, The Horses of McBride
Drama series	Lifestyle or reality/competition
Graeme Manson, Orphan Black: "Natural Selection"; Adam Barken, Flashpoint: "Fit for Duty"; Alex Levine, Orphan Black: "Unconscious Selection"; Sherry White, Saving Hope: "Wishbones"; Damon Vignale and Ron E. Scott, Blackstone: "Reap What You Sow"	Mark Lysakowski and Rob Brunner, The Amazing Race Canada: "Where in the World Is Ogopogo?"; Jameel Bharmal, Restaurant Takeover: "Sunnybrook"; Ron Carroll, Undercover Boss Canada: "VON"; Michael Lavoie, Yukon Gold: "Freeze Up"; Christopher Nelson, Ex-Wives of Rock: "I Miss You Like I Miss You"
Variety or sketch comedy
Albert Howell, Bob Kerr, Cathy Jones, Dean Jenkinson, Gary Pearson, Greg Thomey, Mark Critch, Mary Walsh, Michael Balazo, Mike Allison, Nigel Lawrence, Rupinder Gill, Scott Vrooman, Shaun Majumder and Susan Kent, This Hour Has 22 Minutes: "Season 20, Episode 11"; Luciano Casimiri, Mark De Angelis, Martin Short, Michael Short, Seán Cullen and Tim Steeves, 1st Canadian Screen Awards; Kim Clarke Champniss, Luciano Casimiri, Michael Bublé and Tim Rykert, Juno Awards of 2013; Chris Finn, George Westerholm, Greg Eckler, Rick Currie, Rick Mercer and Tim Steeves, Rick Mercer Report: "Episode 1"

== Digital media ==
Best Original Program or Series produced for Digital Media – Fiction	Best Cross-Platform Project – Fiction
Space Janitors; Everyone's Famous; Letterkenny Problems; The True Heroines; Versus Valerie	Continuum Interactive; Arctic Air Extended Season Finale; Murdoch Mysteries: Nightmare on Queen St.; Republic of Doyle Ride-Along App
Best Original Program or Series produced for Digital Media – Non-Fiction	Best Cross-Platform Project – Non-Fiction
The Beetle Roadtrip Sessions (CBC Music): Brent Hodge, Bryan Ward, Grant Lawrence, Kai Black, Talia Schlanger; Burgundy Jazz (Radio-Canada): David Eng, Dominic Turmel, Katarina Soukup, Pierre-Mathieu Fortin; Grow Inc. (M2O): Bradley Shende; Indie Game: The Movie Special Edition (Blinkworks): James Swirsky, Jim Guthrie, Lisanne Pajot; The Real Backpackers (Smokebomb Entertainment): Annie Unnold, Carl Armstrong, Carrie Hayden, Jay Bennett, Veronica Heringer	The Amazing Race Canada Interactive; Big Brother Canada; Hockey Night in Canada: 2nd Screen; Perfect Storms Interactive; Over the Rainbow
Best Cross-Platform Project – Children's and Youth	Best Original Interactive Production Produced for Digital Media
The Next Step Interactive; Cross Country Fun Hunt Online; Slugterra Digital; Tumbletown Yard Sale	Ruby Skye PI; The Loxleys and the War of 1812; NFB Space School; Stashing Their Cash: How the Rich Hide Money
Best Performance in a Program or Series Produced for Digital Media
Katie Boland, Long Story Short; Dillon Casey, Backpackers; Missy Peregrym, Rookie Blue: In Session; Gregory Smith, Rookie Blue: In Session; Pat Thornton, Everyone's Famous

== Multiple nominations and awards ==
Films that received multiple nominations
Nominations	Show
10	Enemy
8	Tom at the Farm
6	Gabrielle
6	Maïna
6	The Mortal Instruments: City of Bones
5	The Dismantling
5	Empire of Dirt
5	The F Word

Films that received multiple awards
Awards	Film
5	Enemy
5	The Mortal Instruments: City of Bones
2	Gabrielle
2	Louis Cyr

Shows that received multiple nominations
Nominations	Show
14	Orphan Black
12	Less Than Kind
9	Rookie Blue
8	Call Me Fitz
8	Flashpoint
8	Seed
7	The Borgias
7	CBC News: The National
6	2013 Juno Awards
6	Bomb Girls
6	Hockey Night in Canada
6	Satisfaction
6	Vikings
5	100th Grey Cup
5	Borealis
5	Degrassi
5	Gavin Crawford's Wild West
5	Mr. D
5	Perfect Storms
5	Rick Mercer Report
5	Saving Hope
5	World Without End

Shows that received multiple awards
Awards	Show
10	Orphan Black
4	100th Grey Cup
4	Degrassi
4	Less Than Kind
3	The Amazing Race Canada
3	Borealis
3	Call Me Fitz
3	The Defector: Escape from North Korea
3	Doc Zone
3	Rick Mercer Report

== Special awards ==
Several special awards were given:

- Board of Directors' Tribute: Ted Kotcheff
- Board of Directors' Tribute: Marjorie Anthony Linden
- Lifetime Achievement Award: David Cronenberg
- Earle Grey Award: Colm Feore
- Digital Media Trailblazing Award: Alan Sawyer
- Margaret Collier Award: Semi Chellas
- Humanitarian Award: Alanis Obomsawin
- Outstanding Technical Achievement Award: iGateway of CTV News
- Fan Choice Award for Favourite Canadian Screen Star: Zoie Palmer
