= Ty Olsson =

Canadian actor (born 1974)

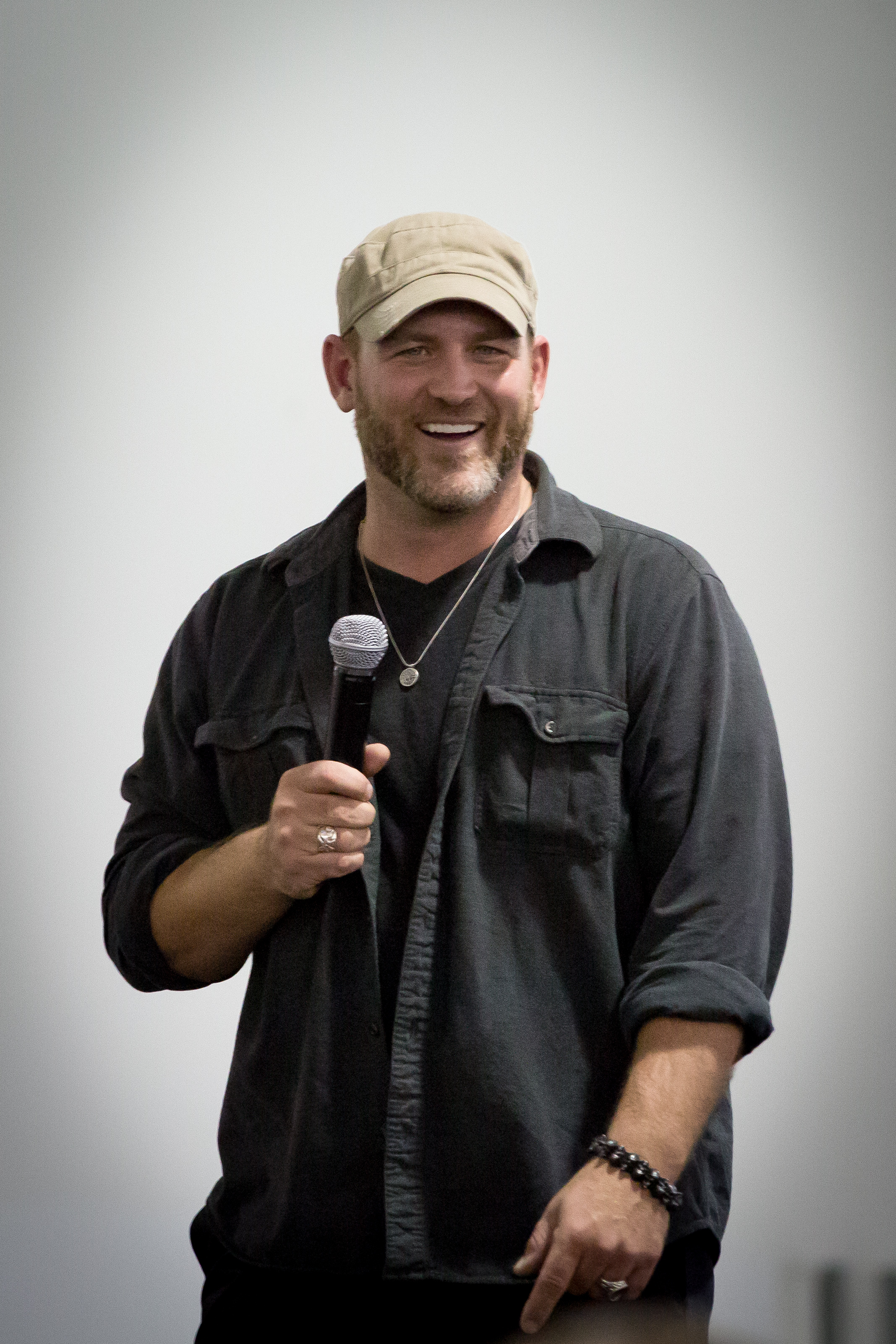
- Olsson in 2013
- Born: Halifax, Nova Scotia, Canada
- Education: Studio 58
- Occupation: Actor
- Years active: 1998–present
- Spouses: Leanna Nash (m. 2005; div. 2012) Katherine Lohmeyer (m. 2019; div. 2021)
- Partner(s): DJ Qualls (2021–present; engaged)
- Children: 2

Tyler Victor Olsson is a Canadian actor and voice actor. He is known for his roles as Benny Lafitte in Supernatural (2013–2019) and real-life 9/11 hero Mark Bingham in the A&E television film Flight 93 (2006), as well as providing the voice of Ord in the PBS Kids animated children's series Dragon Tales (1999–2005) and the voice of Frank West in the video game Dead Rising 4 (2016).

== Early life ==
Olsson was born in Halifax, Nova Scotia, Canada and was raised in Ottawa, Ontario. He attended Canterbury High School, an arts school in Ottawa where he specialized in drama, dance, and music. He continued to study acting at Studio 58.

== Career ==
Olsson has primarily appeared in supporting or character roles in a number of films and television shows. As a voice actor, he is best known as the voice of Herry in the hit Canadian television series Class of the Titans and Ian's older brother Kyle in the YTV animated series Being Ian. He has also been featured in Battlestar Galactica, in Christmas Caper alongside Shannen Doherty in 2007, and as Rollie Crane in Defying Gravity. Olsson starred as 9/11 victim Mark Bingham in the A&E television film Flight 93. Ty originated the role of Deputy Andy on Eureka, but was replaced by Kavan Smith after two appearances. One of Olsson's most notable roles is Benny, a vampire, on Season 8 of Supernatural.

== Personal life ==
Olsson was married to Leanna Nash from 2005 until their divorce in 2012. They have two daughters. On September 7, 2019, Olsson married Katherine Lohmeyer, a NICU nurse in Las Vegas, Nevada. Ty Olsson and Katherine Lohmeyer filed a joint petition for divorce on September 8, 2021.

Olsson is queer and currently in a relationship with fellow Supernatural actor DJ Qualls, and the two plan to marry.

== Filmography ==
=== Film ===
Year	Title	Role	Notes
1999	Lake Placid	State Trooper	
2000	How to Kill Your Neighbor's Dog	Cop #6 - Detective	Released in 2002
2001	Valentine	Jock	
2002	Mobile Suit Gundam: Char's Counterattack	Astonaige Medoz	Voice, English dub
2002	Ignition	Conor's Partner	
2002	Lone Hero	Sticky	
2002	Stark Raving Mad	Nate the Goon	
2003	Dreamcatcher	Army Truck Driver	
2003	Willard	Officer Salmon	
2003	Agent Cody Banks	Security Guard	
2003	X2	Mitchell Laurio	
2003	G.I. Joe: Spy Troops	Storm Shadow	Voice
2004	G.I. Joe: Valor vs. Venom	Storm Shadow	Voice
2004	G.I. Joe: Ninja Battles	Storm Shadow	Voice
2004	Miracle	State Trooper	
2004	Walking Tall	Deputy	
2004	The Chronicles of Riddick	Merc	
2005	Elektra	Second Paramedic	
2005	Missing in America	Soldier	
2005	Ark	Lorris	Voice
2005	Chaos	Damon Richards	
2005	The Score	Owen	
2005	Just Friends	Tim	
2006	RV	Diablo Pass Officer	
2006	Firewall	Airport Traffic Cop	
2006	Deck the Halls	Trucker	
2007	Aliens vs. Predator: Requiem	Nathan	
2007	Married Life	Policeman	
2007	Christmas Caper	Sheriff Hank Harrison	
2008	Chaos Theory	Evil Ferryman	
2008	The Day the Earth Stood Still	Flash Chamber Colonel	
2009	2012	Air Force One Officer	
2011	Rise of the Planet of the Apes	Chief John Hamil	
2011	The Twilight Saga: Breaking Dawn – Part 1	Phil	
2012	The Twilight Saga: Breaking Dawn – Part 2	Phil	Uncredited
2013	Borealis	Vic	Direct-to-video
2014	Godzilla	Jainway	
2014	Cut Bank	Harvey	
2014	Deeper	The Hunter	Direct-to-video
2015	Just the Way You Are	Ian Wreitz	Hallmark movie
2015	12 Rounds 3: Lockdown	Harris	Direct-to-video
2017	The Shack	1950s Mack's Grandpa	
2017	War for the Planet of the Apes	Red	Voice, also motion-capture
2017	S.W.A.T.: Under Siege	Ward	Direct-to-video
2018	Gumshoes	Buddy Griss	
2023	Thanksgiving	Mitch Collins	

=== Television ===
Year	Title	Role	Notes
1998	The X-Files	Young Orderly	Episode: "Kitsunegari"
1998	The Sentinel	Bo Crockett	Episode: "Crossroads"
1998	Cupid	Jerk	Episode: "Pilot"
1999	The Crow: Stairway to Heaven	Funboy / George Jamieson	5 episodes
1999	The Sheldon Kennedy Show	Mark	Television film
1999	As Time Runs Out	Luke	Television film
1999	Cold Squad	Eric Peter Winslow	Episode: "Deadly Games: Part 2"
1999, 2003	The Wonderful World of Disney	Frank Pierce, Demons Fan #2	2 episodes
1999, 2005	Stargate SG-1	Jaffa #1 / Colonel Barnes	2 episodes
1999–2005	Dragon Tales	Ord	Voice, 94 episodes
2000	Mobile Suit Gundam Wing	Additional voices	English dub; episode: "Five Gundams Confirmed"
2000	A Storm in Summer	Biker	Television film
2000	Up, Up and Away	Barker	Television film
2000	Harsh Realm	Republican Guard	Episode: "Three Percenters"
2000–2001	The Outer Limits	Mike, Franklin	Episodes: "Free Spirit", "Manifest Destiny"
2000–2002	Dark Angel	Mario the Bodyguard	2 episodes
2001	Black River	Frank Yarley	Television film
2001	Night Visions	Bartender, Paramedic #2	2 episodes
2002	Tom Stone	Eugene	2 episodes
2002	Jeremiah	Rourke	Episode: "Out of the Ashes"
2003	Just Cause	—N/a	Episode: "Buried Past"
2003	Critical Assembly	Jeff	Television film
2003	Battlestar Galactica	Lt. Aaron Kelly	Miniseries
2003	Tarzan	Animal Control Officer	2 episodes
2004	Transformers: Energon	Downshift	Voice, English dub
2004	The Ranch	Other David	Television film
2004	Kingdom Hospital	Danny	10 episodes
2004	Dead Like Me	Buddy Briggs	Episode: "Death Defying"
2005	Krypto the Superdog	Drooly	Voice, episode: "The New Recruit"
2005	Class of the Titans	Herry / Henry / Minotaur	Voice
2005–2008	Being Ian	Kyle / Evan / Grey / Man / Scooter Rider 2 / Teacher / Nerd 2 / Patient / Bank Robber	Voice
2005–2009	Battlestar Galactica	LSO Capt. Aaron Kelly	8 episodes
2006	Supernatural	Eli	1 episodes
2006	Flight 93	Mark Bingham	Television film
2006–2008	Men in Trees	Sam the Plow Guy	16 episodes
2007	Fallen	Hawkins	Episode: "Part 2: The Journey"
2007–2008	Flash Gordon	Vultan	3 episodes
2008	Mayerthorpe	Brock Myrol	Television film
2009	Defying Gravity	Rollie Crane	12 episodes
2009	Smallville	Cop / Sniper	Episode: "Bulletproof"
2009	Impact	Derek	Part 2 of Television Mini-series
2009	Psych	Manetti	Episode: "Earth, Wind and... Wait for it"
2009–2010	Eureka	Andy	2 episodes
2009–2012	Iron Man: Armored Adventures	Killer Shrike	Voice, 3 episodes
2010	V	5th Column captured V-sympathizer	2 episodes
2010	The Haunting Hour: The Series	Steve	Episode: "Catching Cold"
2011	Ice Road Terror	Jack Simmons	Television film
2011	The Killing Game	Joe Quinn	Television film
2011	Heartland	Bruce Tatum	Episode: "Beyond Hell's Half Mile"
2011–2012	Voltron Force	Hunk	Voice, 25 episodes
2011–2012	True Justice	Castillo, Axel	7 episodes
2012	Hell on Wheels	Lt. Griggs	2 episodes
2012	Once Upon a Time	Hordor	Episode: "Desperate Souls"
2012	Falling Skies	Sgt. Clemons	2 episodes
2012	Flashpoint	James Mitchell	Episode: "Broken Peace"
2012	Arrow	Martin Somers	Episode: "Honor Thy Father"
2013	Played	Russell Hagler	Episode: "Cops"
2013–2014	Packages from Planet X	Troll	Voice, 26 episodes
2013–2019	Supernatural	Benny Lafitte	10 episodes
2014	The Tomorrow People	Errol	Episode: "The Citadel"
2014–2015	Unreal	Kirk	4 episodes
2014–2015	Continuum	Marcellus	4 episodes
2014–2016	Nerds and Monsters	Stan Grissle	Voice, 40 episodes
2014–2017	The 100	Nyko	10 episodes
2015	Strange Empire	Bo	Episode: "The Dark Riders"
2015	iZombie	Detective Pratt	Episode: "Pilot"
2015	Just the Way You Are	Ian	Television film
2015	The Legend of Davy Crockett	Davy Crockett	Television film
2015–2016	Motive	Tim Kelly	2 episodes
2016	Dirk Gently's Holistic Detective Agency	Dorian	Episodes: "Weaponized Soul", "Horizons"
2016	Murder, She Baked: A Peach Cobbler Mystery	Sheriff Jim Grant	Television film
2017	Slasher: Guilty Party	Glenn	6 episodes
2018	NCIS	Burke	Episode: "Death From Above"
2018–2019	The Man in the High Castle	Major Tod Metzger	6 episodes
2019	Project Blue Book	Sheriff Donnelly	Episode: "The Scoutmaster"
2019	Black Summer	Patrick	Episode: "Human Flow"
2020	Fortunate Son	—N/a	8 episodes
2020	Big Sky	George	Episode: "Unfinished Business"
2020–2021	Wynonna Earp	Sheriff Hoyt Clayborn	5 episodes
2022	Angry Birds: Summer Madness	Bomb	Main role
2024	Billy the Kid	Colonel Nathan Dudley	3 episodes

=== Video games ===
Year	Title	Voice role	Notes
2000	Dragon Tales: Dragon Seek	Ord	
2003	Homeworld 2	Pilot #3	
2016	Dead Rising 4	Frank West	Credited as Victor Nosslo

== Awards and nominations ==
Year	Award	Category	Work	Result	Ref
2016	UBCP/ACTRA Awards	Best Actor	UnREAL	Nominated	
2017	Leo Awards	Best Supporting Performance by a Male in a Television Movie	A Surrogates Nightmare	Won	
