= Akido (musician) =

Canadian electronic musician

aKido
- Also known as: aKido
- Born: Kim Gaboury; Quebec City, Quebec, Canada
- Origin: Montreal, Quebec, Canada
- Genres: Electronic; IDM; rock; ambient; experimental
- Occupation: Composer
- Instruments: Guitar, Drums, Piano, Synthesizer
- Years active: 2003–present
- Labels: Nordique Music; Fullspin Music
- Members: Kim Gaboury; On Tour: Martin Gaboury (drum)
- Website: www.akidomusic.com

Kim Gaboury better known by his pseudonym Akido (stylized as aKido) is a Canadian electronic rock musician and composer based in Montreal, Quebec. Gaboury assembles a band for live performances, but records without them in the studio.

== Career ==
As a young man Gaboury played guitar for the band Zolof.

In 2004, calling himself Akido, he released a seven-track instrumental album; he also released a song, "Les Humains", which was later the basis for of an animated music video created by Felix Lajeunesse and Paul Raphaël. Another 2004 release, "Playtime", was played regularly on campus and community radio stations that year.

In September 2007, according to The R3-30, the aKido song "Dancing in Chains" was the third-most popular indie song in Canada.

Gaboury joined Michel Cusson, Térez Montcalm and Luck Mervil to form the Cafe Elektric collective; the group performed at the 2009 Francofolies festival.

AKido's album "Gamechanger", released on the Nordique label in August 2010, was number 13 on the Earshot Radio Chart's Top 20 Electronic chart for 2010. In January 2011, Gamechanger was nominated for the Electronica Album category for The 10th Annual Independent Music Awards, and in October 2011, nominated for the "Album électronique de l'année" at l'ADISQ.

In 2012 Akido's recording "Undark" received regular airplay on campus and community radio in the Montreal area.

In March 2014, Kim was nominated at the 2nd Canadian Screen Awards in the Canadian Screen Award for Best Original Score category for the film Maïna.

AKido collaborated with electronic music producer Pascal Asselin, known as Millimetrik, to create the 2016 album Fog Dreams.

== Discography ==
- Playtime, 2004
- Blink, 2007
- GameChanger, 2010
- Undark, 2012

== Reissues ==
- Blink Reissue, 2010
- Playtime Reissue, 2010

== EP ==
- Les Humains, 2010
- Thearly Ears, 2010

== Videoclips ==
- "Dancing in Chains"
- "Les Humains"
