= Andrew Rai Berzins =

Canadian film and TV writer

Andrew Rai Berzins is a Canadian film and television writer. He is most noted as cowriter with Andrew Wreggitt of the television film Borealis, for which they won the Canadian Screen Award for Best Writing in a Dramatic Program or Miniseries at the 2nd Canadian Screen Awards in 2014.

Berzins published a short story collection, Cerberus, with Goose Lane Editions in 1994. The following year Holly Dale directed Berzins's first screenplay, Blood and Donuts, for which Berzins received a Genie Award nomination for Best Original Screenplay at the 17th Genie Awards in 1996. In the same era, he was a writer for the television series Straight Up.

He received three Gemini Award nominations for Best Writing in a Dramatic Program or Mini-Series in the 2000s at the 16th Gemini Awards in 2001 for Scorn, at the 18th Gemini Awards in 2003 for Chasing Cain II: Face, and at the 19th Gemini Awards in 2004 for Cowboys and Indians: The J.J. Harper Story.

He has also been a two-time WGC Screenwriting Award winner, in 1997 for Straight Up and in 2001 for Scorn, and was a nominee in 2000 for Cold Squad and in 2006 for Beowulf & Grendel.

His other credits have included the television series North of 60 and Tom Stone, and the documentary film Passage.
