= Too Young to Marry =

2007 television film by Michel Poulette

- Promotional poster
- Screenplay by: Elle Triedman
- Story by: Sterling Anderson
- Directed by: Michel Poulette
- Starring: Nina Dobrev; Dillon Casey; Polly Draper
- Composer: Luc St. Pierre
- Countries of origin: Canada; United States
- Original language: English

Production
- Producers: Neil Bregman; Jesse Prupas; David J. Patterson
- Cinematography: Stephen Reizes
- Editor: Denis Papillon
- Running time: 90 minutes
- Production companies: Muse Entertainment; Sound Venture Productions; Granada America

Original release
- Network: Lifetime
- Release: July 9, 2007

Too Young to Marry is a 2007 romantic comedy-drama television film directed by Michel Poulette and based on a story by Elle Triedman. It involves two 17-year-olds, Max Doyle (Dillon Casey) and Jessica Carpenter (Nina Dobrev), who think that they are in love and decide to get married, despite their parents' disapproval. Shortly afterward, the two begin to realize they have very different views on the future.

The film also features Polly Draper, Allison Graham, Anna Hopkins, James O'Regan, and Amanda Tilson. Too Young to Marry premiered in the United States on Lifetime on July 9, 2007.

== Plot ==
In Connecticut, Max and Jessica are a high school couple and very much in love after meeting as freshmen. Max has an interest in construction, while Jessica's ambition is to be an orthopedic surgeon. Jessica lives with her mother and younger sister. She must contend with the aftermath of her parents' acrimonious divorce. She still believes in the meaning of true love when she allows Max to sneak into her bedroom so that the couple can spend more time together. Their plan is to attend Harvard University.

When Jessica's father, Roger, reveals that his girlfriend, Kelly, is pregnant and they are going to get married, Jessica and her sister are shocked and disgusted. Jessica's father expects his older daughter to tell his ex-wife of the impending marriage. When Jessica sees her mother arrive home after a bad date with a philatelist, she does not reveal to her what her father has told her.

Jessica discovers that Harvard has accepted her. She and Max are ecstatic. The couple are then less than enthusiastic when Jessica and Max learn that Harvard has deferred Max's acceptance. Matters improve for the couple when Max proposes to Jessica on Valentine's Day. He feels that he has never been more sure of anything and that they are ready to spend the rest of their lives together. He loves his fiancé because of her optimistic attitude, the fact that she is headstrong and her ability to make things work. Jessica immediately accepts and feels that in spite of the proposal, she will still attend Harvard.

Jessica and Max announce their engagement plans to both sets of parents. Since Jessica is underage, she requires consent from her parents. Roger feels as if his daughter will be compromising her university education and does not wish to play a part in Jessica and Max's marriage. Max's father supports his son's decision because he feels that Jessica is a terrific person and that he and his wife also married at a young age. Jessica's mother makes her daughter promise that she will finish college and earn her degree, as well as use birth control.

On Jessica's wedding day, Roger begs his daughter not to go through with the marriage. Max and Jessica get married and live at Jessica's home, as her mother gives them permission. Tensions arise when Max moves his trophies into the room and Jessica becomes slightly uncomfortable. In spite of this, Max and Jessica seem happy to spend the rest of their lives together. Unfortunately, Harvard rejects Max. Jessica shows her ability to rectify situations when the couple rents off-campus accommodation because they want to be together.

Jessica meets Sophie and Carter, two freshmen. They are curious and surprised about Jessica's marriage. Jessica and Carter share a romantic kiss after she hears him play his guitar at a local bar, but Jessica tells him that it must never happen again. Tensions arise between Jessica and Max when Max forgets to pay the electricity bill, although he does make an effort to make good his wrong by preparing a candlelight supper. Jessica also becomes even more annoyed with her husband when he reveals that he does not want to attend college.

When Max sees Carter and Jessica having a drink together, Jessica stays at Sophie's for a trial separation from Max. Later, when Max tries to apologize to Jessica, she realizes that he has been kissing another young woman. Carter and Jessica spend more time together. This culminates in the two kissing passionately, which Jessica stops. Outside Carter's place, they run into Max and another young woman. Max and Jessica both move back to their respective homes temporarily. Max's parents encourage him to get an annulment or divorce. Jessica's mother advises her that a test of a strong marriage is the ability to get through challenging times.

When the couple has dinner together, Max reveals that he has started to fill in college applications and that he has been offered an internship at an architect's office. The film ends with Max and Jessica making a concerted effort to rebuild their marriage.
