= God's Greatest Hits =

Canadian music documentary television series

God's Greatest Hits is a Canadian music documentary television series, which airs on VisionTV. Each episode of the series focuses on one or more popular spiritual songs, such as Christian hymns and gospel songs, including both documentary and interview segments on the history of the songs and performances of the songs by musicians.

The series is a two-time Canadian Screen Award nominee for Best Music Program or Series, at the 2nd Canadian Screen Awards in 2014 and the 3rd Canadian Screen Awards in 2015.
