= Passage (2008 film) =

- Directed by: John Walker
- Written by: John Walker; Andrew Rai Berzins
- Produced by: Andrea Nemtin; John Walker; Kent Martin
- Starring: Rick Roberts; Geraldine Alexander
- Narrated by: Minoru Fukushima
- Cinematography: Kent Nason
- Edited by: Jeff Warren; John Brett
- Production companies: PTV Productions; John Walker Productions; National Film Board of Canada
- Release date: April 2008 (Hot Docs)
- Running time: 108 minutes
- Country: Canada
- Language: English

Passage is a 2008 documentary film partly based on the book Fatal Passage about Sir John Franklin's lost expedition through the Northwest Passage. The film explores the fate of the doomed mission, including John Rae's efforts to uncover the truth, and Lady Franklin's campaign to defend her late husband's reputation. The film also features Inuk statesman Tagak Curley, who challenges claims made by Lady Franklin supported by her powerful friend, the story teller and "famous author Charles Dickens", widely reported at the time, that Aboriginal people were responsible for the signs of cannibalism among the remains of the doomed crew.

It premiered at the Hot Docs film festival in Toronto, Canada in April 2008.

Passage has two main storylines. The first shows John Walker and crew making an historical fiction film Fatal Passage with a screenplay by Andrew Rai Berzins. This includes script readings, discussions, and scenes from that film (which was not completed). The second story line is completely non-fiction. It includes historical narratives illustrated with paintings, cast and crew visiting the places Rae knew (Orkney, the Arctic), Inuit culture, and interviews with experts.

The film was written, directed and narrated by John Walker. It stars Rick Roberts as John Rae and Geraldine Alexander as Lady Franklin.

== Reception ==
It won two awards at the Atlantic Film Festival: Best Director-John Walker and Best Cinematography-Kent Nason and Nigel Markham. Passage also received the Grand Prize for Best Canadian Production at the Banff World Television Festival. Critical praise for the film included Martin Knelman of the Toronto Star, who called the film "one of the great triumphs in Canadian documentary film history."
