= Greyston Holt =

Canadian actor (born 1985)

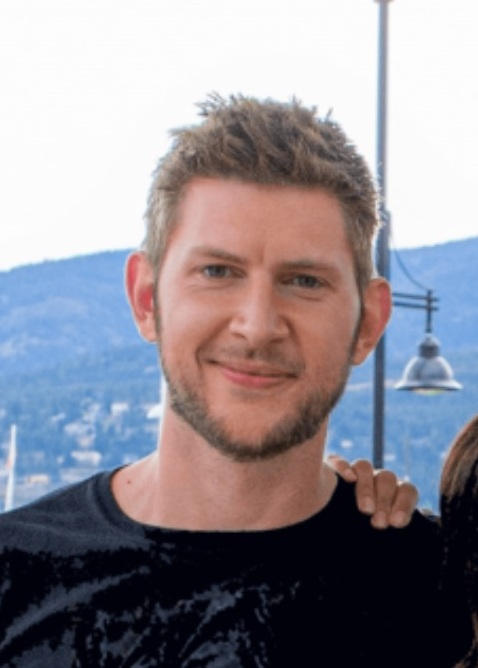
- Greyston Holt in 2020
- Born: Greyston Stefancsik; September 30, 1985 (age 40); Calgary, Alberta, Canada
- Occupation: Actor
- Years active: 2004–present
- Partner: Cristina Rosato
- Children: 1

Greyston Holt (born September 30, 1985) is a Canadian actor. He is known for his role as Ray Prager Jr. in the television series Durham County, as young Emerson Hauser in the Fox series Alcatraz, as Clayton Danvers in the Space series Bitten, and as Detective Hudson Riley in the Amazon Prime Video series Neagley.

== Personal life ==
Greyston Stefancsik was born in Calgary, Alberta. He was raised by his parents, Mike and Nancy, on Salt Spring Island, British Columbia. His grandparents, Mike and Edith Stefancsik emigrated from Hungary in 1957 to Lethbridge. Greyston's maternal grandmother, Anna Horvath also immigrated from Hungary with her parents in 1927.

During his high school years, he learned to play guitar after which he formed a band and played at various venues. He also took an acting class for the "extra credits" and fell in love with a new avenue of expression.

== Career ==
He moved to Vancouver after high school to pursue an acting career. He was cast in a small role in Killer Bash which was followed by another small role in Steven Spielberg's award winning miniseries, Into the West. After small roles in major television shows like Smallville, Blood Ties and The 4400, he was cast in a recurring role in Durham County for which he was nominated for a Leo Award for Best Supporting Performance by a Male in a Dramatic Series. He was later cast in guest roles on Stargate Universe, Sanctuary, Fringe and Flashpoint.

In 2011, he was cast as the Young Emerson Hauser in the short-lived FOX series, Alcatraz. His biggest role was being cast in Space fantasy/horror TV series Bitten for which he received another "Leo Award" nomination. The success of the show led to it being acquired by American basic cable channel, Syfy who renewed the show for a second 10-episode season.

== Filmography ==
=== Film ===
Year	Title	Role	Notes
2004	The Sisterhood	Dan	Direct-to-video; Credited as Greyston Stefancsik
2008	Lost Boys: The Tribe	Evan Monroe	Direct-to-video
2008	Slap Shot 3: The Junior League	Riley Haskell	Direct-to-video
2014	Lonesome Dove Church	Isaac Shepherd	
2014	See No Evil 2	Will	Direct-to-video
2014	Deeper	John Wilkinson	
2022	Lou	Chris	

=== Television ===
Year	Title	Role	Notes
2004	Perfect Romance	Long-haired kid	Television film Credited as Greyston Stefancsik
2005	Killer Bash	Greg	Television film
2005	Into the West	Aaron Wheeler	Miniseries; episode: "Dreams and Schemes"
2006	A Girl Like Me: The Gwen Araujo Story	Jaron Nabors	Television film
2007	Smallville	Tobias Rice	Episode: "Freak"
2007	Blood Ties	Brendan	Episode: "Stone Cold"
2007–2010	Durham County	Ray Prager Jr.	Main role
2007	The 4400	Byron Lillibridge	Episode: "One of Us"
2007	Flash Gordon	Keith Parks	Episode: "Life Source"
2007	Sabbatical	Jordan	Television film
2008	Nightmare at the End of the Hall	Sam	Television film
2010	Fakers	Tanner Cruikshank	Television film
2010	Seven Deadly Sins	Cain Geary	Miniseries; 2 episodes
2011	Fringe	Vince	Episode: "Os"
2011	Stargate Universe	Corporal Reynolds	Episode: "The Hunt"
2011	Sanctuary	Lt. Coxswell	Episode: "Into the Black"
2011	The Killing Game	Charlie	Television film
2011	Flashpoint	Kevin Baines	Episode: "Team Player"
2012	Alcatraz	Young Emerson Hauser	3 episodes
2012	Once Upon a Time	Frederick / Jim	Episode: "What Happened to Frederick"
2012	Psych	Todd Kramer	Episode: "Shawn and the Real Girl"
2012	Hannah's Law	Wyatt Earp	Television film
2012	The Horses of McBride	Simon Senegal	Television film
2013	Borealis	Dan Riordan	Television film
2013	Emily Owens, M.D.	Mrs. Duroux's son	Episode: "Emily and... The Social Experiment"
2013	Arctic Air	Jesse Backus	Episode: "Stormy Weather"
2013	Motive	Scott Hayward	Episode: "Pushover"
2013	She Made Them Do It	Rick	Television film
2013	Cedar Cove	Seth Gunderson	Episode: "Pilot"
2014–2016	Bitten	Clayton Danvers	Main role
2014	Supernatural	Dale	Episode: "Alex Annie Alexis Ann"
2014	Signed, Sealed, Delivered	Sam	Episode: "Soulmates"
2014	The Christmas Secret	Brad	Television film
2015	All of My Heart	Daryl	Television film
2016–2017	No Tomorrow	Mikhail	4 episodes
2016	A Puppy for Christmas	Liam	Television film
2017	Somewhere Between	Kyle	6 episodes
2017	A Very Country Christmas	Zane Gunther	Television film
2018	Take Two	Dylan	Episode: "Ex's and Oh's"
2019	A Very Country Wedding	Zane Gunther	Television film
2019	The 100	Gavin / Marcus Kane II	2 episodes
2019–2022	Chesapeake Shores	Jay Ross	Recurring, seasons 4–5
2019	Batwoman	Tyler	5 episodes
2019	A Sweet Christmas Romance	Brad	Television movie
2020	50 States of Fright	Scott Wilke	3 episodes
2020	Love Is a Piece of Cake	Aidan Cooper	Television film
2020	A Very Country Christmas Homecoming	Zane Gunther	Television film
2020	Cross Country Christmas	Max Cooper	Television film
2020	The Wedding Planners	Jack	Episode: "The Perfect Wedding"
2021	A Wedding to Remember	Brian Wolf	Television film
2021–2023	Riverdale	Glen Scott	Recurring role (season 5-6) Guest role (season 7); 9 episodes
2022	House of Chains	Tye McGrath	Television film
2023	FBI: International	David Papp	Episode: "Trust"
2023	The Night Agent	Paulo	3 episodes
2026	Neagley	Detective Hudson Riley	8 episodes

== Awards and nominations ==
Year	Award	Category	Work	Result	Refs
2008	Leo Award	Best Supporting Performance by a Male in a Dramatic Series	Durham County	Nominated	
2014	Leo Award	Best Lead Performance by a Male in a Dramatic Series	Bitten	Nominated	
2015	Golden Maple Awards	Best Actor in a TV series broadcasted in the U.S.	Bitten	Nominated	
2021	Leo Awards	Best Lead Performance by a Male in a Television Movie	Cross Country Christmas	Nominated	
2023	Leo Awards	Best Lead Performance - Male in a Television Movie	House Of Chains	Nominated	
