= Embeds =

Comedy television series

- Genre: Comedy
- Created by: Scott Conroy, Peter Hamby
- Showrunner: Todd Waldman
- Directed by: Danny Jelinek
- Country of origin: United States
- Original language: English
- No. of seasons: 1
- No. of episodes: 6

Production
- Executive producers: Brendan Bragg, Christopher Boyd, Scott Conroy, Michael De Luca, Bryan Haas, Megyn Kelly, Justin Killion, Lucy Kitada, Kevin Mann, Jordana Mollick, Dominic Ottersbach, Cory Stern, Todd Waldman
- Producers: Emma Koenig, Alex Scordelis

Original release
- Network: go90
- Release: January 18, 2017

Embeds is an American comedy television series created by Scott Conroy and Peter Hamby and produced by Megyn Kelly and Michael De Luca. The 6 half-hour episodes aired on go90 premiered on January 18, 2017.

Embeds follows five young journalists ("embeds"), Noah, Marissa, T. J., Quinn, and Syd, covering the primary campaign of John Dobson for competing networks.

== Production ==
Scott Conroy and Peter Hamby were inspired to create the show by their own experience as embeds. They were following Mitt Romney and Sarah Palin for CBS News and CNN, respectively, on the 2008 campaign.

Filming took place in Iowa in 2016, before the presidential election.

All six episodes were directed by Danny Jelinek.

The series was originally planned to stream before election day, but ended up premiering on January 18, 2017.

== Cast and characters ==
- Kelsey Asbille as Marissa
- Taylor Zakhar Perez as Noah Torres
- Max Ehrich as Quinn Harris
- Chloe Brooks as Syd
- Andre Jamal Kinney as T.J.
- Carrie-Lynn Neales as Brynn
- Charles Stransky as McGrady
- Caleb Harris as Miles Dvorak
- Allen D. Edge as Jay
- Don Tieri as John Dobson

== Episodes ==
- Episode 1: Pilot
- Episode 2: Off the Record
- Episode 3: Keg Stands
- Episode 4: Exodus
- Episode 5: Things Get Hairy
- Episode 6: Dreams
