= Jack (2013 film) =

2013 television film directed by Jeff Woolnough

- CBC release poster
- Genre: Drama; Biography
- Screenplay by: Andrew Wreggitt
- Story by: Shelley Eriksen; Andrew Wreggitt
- Directed by: Jeff Woolnough
- Starring: Rick Roberts; Sook-Yin Lee
- Theme music composer: Shawn Pierce
- Opening theme: "Rise Up" by The Parachute Club
- Country of origin: Canada
- Original language: English

Production
- Producers: Laszlo Barna; Kyle Irving; Lisa Meeches; Lesley Oswald; Karen Stermsheg; Melissa Williamson
- Cinematography: C. Kim Miles
- Editor: Mike Lee
- Running time: 89 minutes
- Production companies: Pier 21 Films; Eagle Vision

Original release
- Network: CBC Television
- Release: March 10, 2013

Jack is a Canadian television film, which debuted on CBC Television on March 10, 2013. A biopic of the late Jack Layton, the film stars Rick Roberts as Layton and Sook-Yin Lee as Olivia Chow. The film was originally announced in 2012 as Smilin' Jack: The Jack Layton Story.

The film was directed by Jeff Woolnough, and written by Shelley Eriksen and Andrew Wreggitt. The Parachute Club's 1983 hit single "Rise Up" is the opening theme music.

Both Roberts and Lee won Canadian Screen Awards for their performances at the 2nd Canadian Screen Awards, Roberts as Best Lead Actor in a Television Film or Miniseries and Lee as Best Lead Actress in a Television Film or Miniseries.

== Cast ==
- Rick Roberts as Jack Layton
- Sook-Yin Lee as Olivia Chow
- Zachary Bennett as Brad Lavigne
- Joel Keller as Karl Bélanger
- Wendy Crewson as Anne McGrath
- Judah Katz as Brian Topp

Victoria Snow, Brittany Scobie, Conrad Sweatman, Erin Karpluk and Diana Ha also appeared.

== Production and filming ==
Film for Jack was announced on November 17, 2011. Jack was filmed in Winnipeg.

== Reception ==
The Globe and Mail called Jack a "varnished version of Mr. Layton", while John Doyle of the same periodical, wrote "[Jack Layton] moved us; the biopic [on him], not so much".
