= Allen Smith (cinematographer) =

Canadian cinematographer

Allen Smith is a Canadian cinematographer. He is most noted for his work on the film Seducing Doctor Lewis (La Grande séduction), for which he won both the Genie Award for Best Cinematography at the 24th Genie Awards and the Jutra Award for Best Cinematography at the 6th Jutra Awards.

He was also a Genie Award nominee for Sticky Fingers (Les doigts croches) at the 30th Genie Awards in 2009, a Canadian Screen Award nominee for Maïna at the 2nd Canadian Screen Awards in 2014, and a Jutra nominee for The Little Book of Revenge (Guide de la petit vengeance) at the 9th Jutra Awards in 2007.

His other credits have included the films Winter Stories (Histoires d'hiver), The Hidden Fortress (La Forteresse suspendue), Regina and Maman Last Call.
