= The Magic Hockey Skates =

1991 children's book by Allen Morgan

The Magic Hockey Skates (sometimes referred to by short form as Magic Hockey Skates or just Hockey Skates) is a 1991 children's book written by Allen Morgan and illustrated by Michael Martchenko. It concerns a boy who buys second-hand skates and discovers they give him three wishes.

It was adapted into a 2013 holiday special released by CBC Kids, with guest appearances by Don Cherry, Claude Giroux (as Rocky St. Jean), and Bob Cole. In 2014, the special's directors, Jason Boose and Sarah Mercey, won the Canadian Screen Award for Best Direction in an Animated Program or Series.

Sprout bought the rights to it in 2016, after eOne had already sold rights to other channels such as Disney Channel and KiKA.
