= Mayerthorpe (film) =

2008 TV movie

- Genre: Drama
- Written by: Andrew Wreggitt
- Directed by: Ken Girotti
- Starring: Henry Czerny; Brian Markinson
- Theme music composer: Jonathan Goldsmith
- Country of origin: Canada
- Original language: English

Production
- Producers: Tom Cox; Tim Gamble; Jordy Randall; Michael Shepard; Jon Slan
- Cinematography: Michael Storey
- Editor: Michele Conroy
- Running time: 90 minutes
- Production companies: SEVEN24 Films; Slanted Wheel Entertainment

Original release
- Network: CTV
- Release: February 10, 2008

Mayerthorpe, also known as Menace or To Serve and Protect: Tragedy at Mayerthorpe, is a Canadian dramatic television film which was directed by Ken Girotti and broadcast by CTV in 2008. The film is a dramatization of the Mayerthorpe tragedy of 2005, in which four Royal Canadian Mounted Police officers were shot and killed while executing a search warrant against an illegal marijuana growing operation on the Mayerthorpe, Alberta, farm of James Roszko.

The film stars Brian Markinson as Roszko, and Henry Czerny as Cpl. Alex Stanton, a fictional character who was inserted into the story to provide a narrative centre. Its dramatic focus laid the blame squarely on Canada's justice system for inadequacies in dealing with repeat criminal offenders due to Roszko's prior criminal record.

The cast also included Ben Cotton, Ty Olsson, Adam MacDonald and Gord Rand as the murdered officers Leo Johnston, Brock Myrol, Peter Schiemann and Anthony Gordon, Diane Ladd as Roszko's mother, and Waneta Storms, Landon Liboiron, Shaun Johnston, Peter MacNeill and Dan Petronijevic in supporting roles.

It was shot in Alberta, in and around the towns of Cochrane and Irricana. The families of the slain officers were given a private advance screening of the film.

The film was broadcast by CTV on February 10, 2008.

== Awards ==
| Award | Date of ceremony | Category | Nominees | Result | Reference |
|---|---|---|---|---|---|
| Gemini Awards | November 28, 2008 | Best Television Movie | Jordy Randall, Tom Cox, Jon Slan | Won | |
| Gemini Awards | November 28, 2008 | Best Actor in a Dramatic Program or Miniseries | Henry Czerny | Nominated | |
| Gemini Awards | November 28, 2008 | Best Actor in a Dramatic Program or Miniseries | Brian Markinson | Nominated | |
| Gemini Awards | November 28, 2008 | Best Direction in a Dramatic Program or Mini-Series | Ken Girotti | Nominated | |
| Gemini Awards | November 28, 2008 | Best Writing in a Dramatic Program or Miniseries | Andrew Wreggitt | Won | |
| Gemini Awards | November 28, 2008 | Best Production Design or Art Direction in a Fiction Program or Series | John Blackie | Nominated | |
| Gemini Awards | November 28, 2008 | Best Achievement in Casting | Rhonda Fisekci, Susan Forrest | Nominated | |
| Alberta Film and Television Awards | 2008 | Best Made-for-TV Movie or Miniseries | Mayerthorpe | Won | |
| Alberta Film and Television Awards | 2008 | Best Performance by an Alberta Actor | Landon Liboiron | Won | |
| Alberta Film and Television Awards | 2008 | Best Screenwriter, Drama | Andrew Wreggitt | Won | |
| Directors Guild of Canada | 2008 | Best Direction in a Television Movie or Miniseries | Ken Girotti | Won | |
| Directors Guild of Canada | 2008 | Best Picture Editing in a Television Movie or Mini-Series | Michele Conroy | Nominated | |
| Directors Guild of Canada | 2008 | Best Production Design in a Television Movie or Mini-Series | John Blackie | Nominated | |
| Writers Guild of Canada | 2009 | WGC Screenwriting Award | Andrew Wreggitt | Won | |
