= Andrew Wreggitt =

Andrew Wreggitt (born 1955) is a Canadian television writer and producer from Calgary, Alberta.

He began his career as a writer for the television series The Beachcombers in the 1980s. In this era he was also a writer of poetry, as well as the stage play The Wild Guys in collaboration with his wife Rebecca Shaw. He later became a writer for North of 60 in the 1990s, being promoted to executive story editor by 1996. Following the end of the regular series in 1997, he wrote a number of standalone television films as part of the franchise.

He was subsequently a writer for the drama series Black Harbour, and for several of the Joanne Kilbourn series of mystery television films.

In 2002–03, he created and wrote for the detective drama Tom Stone. He subsequently also wrote for the television series Heartland, Pure, Fortunate Son and The Borderline, and the television films Mayerthorpe, Jack, Shades of Black: The Conrad Black Story and Borealis.

== Awards ==
Award	Date of ceremony	Category	Work	Result	Ref.
Gemini Awards	November 7, 1999	Best Writing in a Dramatic Program or Miniseries	In the Blue Ground	Nominated	
Gemini Awards	November 4, 2002	Best Writing in a Dramatic Program or Miniseries	Dream Storm	Nominated	
Gemini Awards	October 20, 2003	Best Writing in a Dramatic Program or Miniseries	Another Country	Nominated	
Gemini Awards	November 4, 2006	Best Writing in a Dramatic Program or Miniseries	One Dead Indian	Won	
Gemini Awards	November 28, 2008	Best Writing in a Dramatic Program or Miniseries	Mayerthorpe	Won	
Canadian Screen Awards	March 3, 2013	Best Dramatic Miniseries or TV Movie	The Wrath of Grapes: The Don Cherry Story II	Nominated	
Canadian Screen Awards	March 3, 2013	Best Writing in a Dramatic Program or Miniseries	The Wrath of Grapes: The Don Cherry Story II	Nominated	
Canadian Screen Awards	March 9, 2014	Best Dramatic Miniseries or TV Movie	Borealis	Won	
Canadian Screen Awards	March 9, 2014	Best Writing in a Dramatic Program or Miniseries with Andrew Rai Berzins	Borealis	Won	
WGC Screenwriting Awards	2007	Movie of the Week/Miniseries	One Dead Indian	Nominated	
WGC Screenwriting Awards	2008	Movie of the Week/Miniseries	Shades of Black: The Conrad Black Story	Nominated	
WGC Screenwriting Awards	2009	Movie of the Week/Miniseries	Mayerthorpe	Won	
WGC Screenwriting Awards	2009	Movie of the Week/Miniseries	Sticks and Stones	Nominated	
WGC Screenwriting Awards	2013	Movie of the Week/Miniseries	The Phantoms	Won	
WGC Screenwriting Awards	2017	Denis McGrath Award		Won	
WGC Screenwriting Awards	2025	Margaret Collier Award		Won	
