= Carrie-Lynn Neales =

Canadian actress

Carrie-Lynn Neales is a Canadian actress. She is most noted for her role in the television series Seed, for which she received Canadian Screen Award nominations for Best Actress in a Comedy Series at the 2nd Canadian Screen Awards in 2014 and at the 3rd Canadian Screen Awards in 2015. She starred in Embeds as Brynn in 2017. In 2020, she starred in Hudson & Rex episode of "Rex in the City" as Holly Preston.
