= The Horses of McBride =

2012 Canadian TV movie

- Genre: Drama
- Written by: Anne Wheeler
- Directed by: Anne Wheeler
- Starring: Aidan Quinn; MacKenzie Porter; Kari Matchett
- Theme music composer: Louis Natale
- Country of origin: Canada
- Original language: English

Production
- Producers: Frank Siracusa; Paul Gross
- Cinematography: Peter Woeste
- Editor: Lara Mazur
- Running time: 89 minutes
- Production company: Whizbang Films
- Budget: Bell Media

Original release
- Network: CTV
- Release: December 16, 2012

The Horses of McBride is a Canadian drama television film, directed by Anne Wheeler and broadcast by CTV in 2012. The film is based on the true story of a family in McBride, British Columbia, who rescued two horses that had been trapped by an avalanche in 2008.

The film stars Aidan Quinn as patriarch Matt Davidson, Kari Matchett as his wife Avril and MacKenzie Porter as their daughter Nicki, as well as Edward Ruttle, Scott Hylands, Caroline Cave, Greyston Holt, Francis Damberger, Patrick Gilmore, Dustin MacDougall, Anand Rajaram, Phil Fulton, Benjamin Laird, Lisa Christie, James D. Hopkin, Eve Harlow and Michelle Thrush in supporting roles.

The film was shot in the Turner Valley area of Alberta in March 2012, and was broadcast by CTV on December 16, 2012.

== Awards ==
Award	Date of ceremony	Category	Nominees	Result	Reference
Leo Awards	2013	Best Direction in a Television Movie	Anne Wheeler	Won	
Directors Guild of Canada	2013	Best Direction in a Television Movie or Miniseries	Anne Wheeler	Won	
Canadian Screen Awards	2014	Best Television Movie	Frank Siracusa, Paul Gross	Nominated	
Canadian Screen Awards	2014	Best Direction in a Dramatic Program or Mini-Series	Anne Wheeler	Nominated	
Canadian Screen Awards	2014	Best Writing in a Dramatic Program or Mini-Series	Anne Wheeler	Won	
Canadian Screen Awards	2014	Best Original Music for a Dramatic Program, Mini-Series or TV Movie	Louis Natale	Nominated	
Writers Guild of Canada	2014	Best Writing, Television Movie or Miniseries	Anne Wheeler	Nominated	
