= Adam Korson =

Canadian actor

- Born: December 28, 1976 (age 49)
- Occupation: Actor
- Years active: 2003–present
- Known for: Seed

Adam Korson (born December 28, 1976) is a Canadian actor, best known for his lead role as Harry in the Canadian television sitcom Seed.

== Early life and education ==
Originally from Thornhill, Ontario, Korson attended York University for a year before transferring to Randolph Academy for the Performing Arts.

== Career ==
Korson garnered a Canadian Screen Award nomination for best lead actor in a comedy series at the 3rd Canadian Screen Awards.

In addition to Seed, Korson has had supporting or guest roles in the television series Degrassi, 2 Broke Girls, The Jon Dore Television Show, Emily Owens M.D., The Glades, Hot in Cleveland and SurrealEstate, and the film Breakfast with Scot.

== Filmography ==
=== Film ===
Year	Title	Role	Notes
2003	Blind Eyes	Warren	
2007	Breakfast with Scot	Referee	
2016	South32	Dr. Lucca	
2017	The Female Brain	Jimmy	
2017	In Vino	Josh	
2021	The Stairs	Nick	
2026	The Holiday Hitman	Bob	

=== Television ===
Year	Title	Role	Notes
2006	Degrassi: The Next Generation	Male Customer	Episode: "High Fidelity: Part 1"
2007	Nature of the Beast	Danny	Television film
2009	The Jon Dore Television Show	Writer #2	Episode: "Jon Needs Quick Cash"
2011	Normal	Winters	Television film
2011	The Protector	Harry	Episode: "Affairs"
2011	2 Broke Girls	Hipster #2	Episode: "Pilot"
2012	Emily Owens, M.D.	Adam	Episode: "Emily and... The Alan Zolman Incident"
2013	The Glades	Nick Preston	Episode: "Apocalypse Now"
2013–2014	Seed	Harry Dacosta	26 episodes
2014	Signed, Sealed, Delivered	Joshua / Matt	Episode: "A Hope and a Future"
2014	Santa's Little Ferrets	Henry Collins	Television film
2014	Girlfriends' Guide to Divorce	Barry Juck	Episode: "Rule #47: Always Take Advantage of "Me" Time"
2015	Hot in Cleveland	Barney	2 episodes
2015	How Not to Propose	Cedric	Television film
2015	The Unauthorized Beverly Hills, 90210 Story	Darren Star	Television film
2015	The Unauthorized Melrose Place Story	Darren Star	Television film
2015	Castle	Isaac Dern	Episode: "Mr. & Mrs. Castle"
2015–2017	Real Rob	Andy	6 episodes
2016	Serialized	Austin McEwen	Television film
2017	Deal Me	Adam	2 episodes; also writer and producer
2017	Longmire	Dr. Kraybeel	Episode: "Opiates and Antibiotics"
2017–2018	Imposters	Josh Bloom	7 episodes
2019	Teachers	Kyle	4 episodes
2019	The Twilight Zone	Jeff Dolin	Episode: "The Blue Scorpion"
2020	Lucifer	Ron	Episode: "BlueBallz"
2021–2025	SurrealEstate	Father Phil Orley	Main role
2021	The Rookie	Dwayne	Episode: "A.C.H."
2022	This Is Us	Elijah	10 episodes
2022	Maggie	Daniel	2 episodes
2024	Curfew	Ben Williams	6 episodes
