= Ann Shin =

Canadian filmmaker

- Education: University of Toronto
- Occupations: Filmmaker, writer
- Notable work: My Enemy, My Brother

Ann Shin is a filmmaker and writer based in Toronto, Ontario, Canada.

== Early life ==
Shin was born in London, Ontario to parents Sue Shin (née Kim) and Albert Shin. Her mother was born in South Korea, moved to Canada, and worked as a registered nurse. Her father was an agriculturalist specializing in Animal Husbandry in Denmark and at the University of Guelph. Her parents met and got married in Toronto, but soon moved to Langley, British Columbia to start a mushroom farm. Shin spent most of her childhood years on the family farm. In 2019, Shin lost her father to dementia.

Shin moved to Toronto, and completing a Bachelor of Arts, Honors, and Master of Arts in English Literature at University of Toronto. During her university years, she wrote three articles for the University of Toronto Student Newspaper, The Varsity. She also hosted the program Rights Radio on CIUT radio station. Upon graduation, she started working at CBC as a radio producer.

== Journalism career ==
Shin's journalism career began at CBC Radio where she produced a number of shows including Metro Morning, Tapestry, Roots and Wings, Sunday Morning Live. During this time she produced sound poetry and radio documentaries, including How to Breathe the Air of our Ancestors, which won a Gold Medal at the New York Festivals in 1998.

== Film-making career ==
Due to her interest in long-form documentary, Shin moved into television. She began to produce television series for a number of networks, as well as direct independent documentaries. Her documentary credits include the documentary My Enemy, My Brother, which was shortlisted for a 2016 Academy Award and nominated for a News and Documentary Emmy Award. The feature version won Grand Jury Prize at San Diego Film Festival, and the short version was awarded Best Short Documentary in eleven international film festivals including Traverse City Film Festival, Russia's Doker International Festival, Grand Prize Winner of the Best Shorts Humanitarian Awards, the Sepanta Award for Best Short Film. Other of her films include documentary film The Defector: Escape from North Korea (2012), The Four Seasons Mosaic (CBC (2005), Western Eyes (CBC Newsworld) (2000), The Roswell Incident (History) (1998), Almost Real (CBC Newsworld) and How to Breathe the Air of Our Ancestors (CBC Radio) (1998). Shin has produced programs for CBC, TVO, PBS, HBO, ABC, Slice, HGTV, W, Discovery and History, and her programs have sold in territories in the US, Europe, Australia, East Asia and Southeast Asia.

Her cross-platform project The Defector: Escape from North Korea was highly praised by several critics. CNN Connect the World called it an "incredible story", while the Toronto Star named it one of the 10 Must See Films at the Hot Docs Canadian International Documentary Festival. Next Projection said of the film, "The Defector exposes a part of the world that is so heavily shielded we can only know through conjecture." The project won Best Documentary and Best Documentary Director at the 2014 Canadian Screen Awards, and the SXSW Interactive Festival Award, the FITC Award and nextMedia Canadian Digi Awards.

=== Filmography ===
==== Documentary ====
- How to Breathe the Air of Our Ancestors, 1998 - director
- Turning Points of History: The Roswell Incident, 1998 - director
- The Fall of an Asian Tiger, 1999 - director
- Western Eyes, 2000 - director
- Almost Real, Connecting in a Wired World, 2002 - director
- Opening Night: The Four Seasons Mosaic, 2005 - director
- The Defector: Escape from North Korea, 2013 - writer, director, producer
- My Enemy, My Brother, 2014 - writer, director, producer
- Sugar Sisters, 2017 - co-writer, co-director
- The Superfood Chain, 2018 - director
- Artificial Immortality, 2021 - director, writer, producer
- Dangerous Games: Roblox and the Metaverse Exposed, 2025 - director
- #WhileBlack, 2026 - producer

==== Series ====
- Rags to Red Carpet
- The List
- I Do…Let's Eat (2012)
- Save Us from Our House (2005)
- Modern Manners (2000)
- Venture
- Face-Off

== Writing career ==
Shin is a poet and fiction writer, with work published in various anthologies and magazines in both Canada and the United States. She is one of four poets featured in Crossroads Cant, published by Broken Jaw Press in 1997. Mansfield Press published her first volume of poetry, The Last Thing Standing in 2000 to acclaim. In 2013, Brick Books published her second book of poetry, The Family China which won the 2013 Anne Green Award.

Author Nino Ricci referred to her first volume of poetry, The Last Thing Standing as "A beautiful and memorable book. Ann Shin writes about love, loss and the idea of home with clarity, wit and grace". Of her second collection of acclaimed poetry, author and poet Karen Connelly wrote, "… This short, dazzling collection of poems contains a universe — nothing short of North American life in the late twentieth and early twenty-first century. Somehow it is all here, joyously offered up, birth, death, and everything in between…".

Her novel The Last Exiles was the winner of the Trillium Book Award for English Prose in 2022.

=== Bibliography ===
- Crossroads Cant, Broken Jaw Press, 1997
- The Last Thing Standing, Mansfield Press, 2000
- The Family China, Brick Books, 2013
- The Last Exiles, Park Row, 2021

== Honors, Awards, Nominations, and Accomplishments ==
Her films have garnered numerous awards and screened at film festivals around the world, including SXSW, Tribeca International Film Festival, Toronto International Film Festival, Hot Docs Canadian International Documentary Festival, the San Francisco Film Festival, Thessaloniki International Human Rights Film Festival, Montreal World Film Festival, New York Festivals, Mumbai International Film Festival and the Chris Awards.

At the 2015 Vancouver International Film Festival, the Canadian Images shorts jury gave Shin an honorable mention in the Most Promising Director of a Canadian Short Film category for My Enemy, My Brother.-

Film and Television

2017 My Enemy, My Brother, the feature version, wins Grand Jury Prize at the San Diego Asian International Film Festival. 2015 My Enemy, My Brother, Shortlisted for Academy Award and nominated for an News and Documentary Emmy Award.

The Defector: Escape from North Korea

2014 Canadian Screen Awards

- Best Director in a Documentary Program (Won)
- Best Documentary Program (Won)
- Diversity Award (Won)

2013 SXSW Interactive Festival Award

- Best Motion Graphics (Won)

2013 nextMEDIA Canadian Digi Awards

- Best in Cross Platform Non-Fiction (Won)

2013 FITC Awards

- Best Motion Graphics (Won)

2012 Sheffield Doc/Fest

- Sheffield Innovation Award (Nominee)

Opening Night

2005 Gemini Awards

- Best Direction in a Performing Arts Program or Series (for the episode "The Four Seasons Mosaic") (Nominee)

Western Eyes

2000 NFB Diversity Competition

- Reel Diversity Award (Won)

Turning Points of History: Incident at Roswell

2000 Columbus International Film and Video Festival

- Bronze Plaque Award (Documentary) (Won)

How to Breathe the Air of Our Ancestors

1998 New York Festivals

- Gold Medal (Won)

Literature

The Family China

- 2013 Anne Green Award (Won)
