= Fortunate Son (TV series) =

Canadian television series

- Genre: Drama; Political thriller
- Written by: Andrew Wreggitt; Jennica Harper
- Directed by: Stefan Schwartz; Ken Girotti
- Starring: Kari Matchett; Rick Roberts; Kacey Rohl; Stephen Moyer
- Country of origin: Canada
- Original language: English
- No. of seasons: 1
- No. of episodes: 8

Production
- Executive producers: Andrew Wreggitt; Stefan Schwartz; Tom Cox; Jordy Randall; Erin Haskett
- Producers: Brian Dennis; Jessalyn Dennis
- Production companies: Universal International Studios; Lark Productions; SEVEN24 Films

Original release
- Network: CBC
- Release: January 8 – February 26, 2020

Fortunate Son is a Canadian espionage drama television series, which premiered January 8, 2020 on CBC Television. The show is loosely based on the experiences of Mary Cox, the mother of co-executive producer Tom Cox, who helped American draft dodgers cross the border into Canada during the Vietnam War.

The show takes its name from the 1969 Creedence Clearwater Revival protest song "Fortunate Son".

== Premise ==
Set in 1968, the show centres on Ruby Howard, an American expatriate living in British Columbia with her family involved in antiwar activism who is asked to help troubled American Travis Hunter cross the border into Canada in order to dodge the Vietnam War draft. Meanwhile, CIA handler Vern Lang is setting up a complex operation in order to infiltrate the peace movements on both the American and Canadian sides of the border in an effort to stop draft evasion.

== Cast ==
- Kari Matchett as Ruby Howard, an American expat antiwar activist
- Stephen Moyer as Vern Lang, a CIA handler
- Darren Mann as Travis Hunter, an American draft-dodger
- Rick Roberts as Ted, Ruby's husband
- Kacey Rohl as Ellen, Ruby's daughter
- Alex Nachi as Ralph, Ruby's son
- Patrick Gallagher
- Ty Olsson
- Zoé De Grand Maison

== Production ==
The show was co-produced with Lark Productions in Vancouver, which is backed by NBCUniversal, and Seven24Films, to be aired on the CBC. Executive producers included Andrew Wreggitt, Tom Cox, Jordy Randall and Erin Haskett, with Brian Dennis producing. Stefan Schwartz and Ken Girotti directed. Andrew Wreggit was executive producer and showrunner, also stating the show's inspiration came from the childhood of Tom Cox and helping draft dodgers cross the American border in the late 1960s. The drama is "inspired" by a true story. In the story, Ruby Howard is loosely based on Mary Cox, the mother of Tom Cox, a producer at Seven24 Films. Cox stressed the TV series was fictional. Cox's family lived in California in the mid-1960s, and when his brother turned 18 in 1965, their mother decided to move the family to Canada. Cox has related that a CIA operative was planted in his family to spy on his parents for their activism.

Moyer and Matchett were announced as co-stars in July 2019. It filmed some locations in southern Alberta. In July 2019, the production took over a main street in Drumheller during its first days of the shoot, setting up vintage cars and extras with 1960s fashion. Drumheller, Tsuu T’ina reserve, Calgary and High River were used as replacement locations for British Columbia.

The soundtrack includes music by bands such as Creedence Clearwater Revival.

== Episodes ==
No.	Title	Directed by	Written by	Original release date
1	"Fortunate Son"	Stefan Schwartz	Andrew Wreggitt	January 8, 2020
2	"Chimes of Freedom"	Stefan Schwartz	Andrew Wreggitt	January 15, 2020
3	"All Along the Watchtower"	Stefan Schwartz	Andrew Wreggitt	January 22, 2020
4	"Eve of Destruction"	Stefan Schwartz	Jennica Harper	January 29, 2020
5	"For What It's Worth"	Ken Girotti	Andrew Wreggitt	February 5, 2020
6	"White Rabbit"	Ken Girotti	Andrew Wreggitt	February 12, 2020
7	"Ruby Tuesday"	Ken Girotti	Sarah Dodd	February 19, 2020
8	"Suspicious Minds"	Ken Girotti	Andrew Wreggitt	February 26, 2020
