= Borealis (2013 film) =

2013 Canadian science fiction film

- Written by: Andrew Wreggitt; Andrew Rai Berzins
- Directed by: David Frazee
- Starring: Ty Olsson; Michelle Harrison; Patrick Gallagher; Greyston Holt
- Music by: Tom Third
- Country of origin: Canada
- Original language: English

Production
- Producer: Arvi Liimatainen
- Cinematography: Mathias Herndl
- Editor: Brett Sullivan
- Running time: 89 minutes
- Production companies: SEVEN24 Films; Slanted Wheel Entertainment

Original release
- Network: Space
- Release: January 11, 2013

Borealis, also released as Survival Code in the United States, is a Canadian science fiction television film, directed by David Frazee and released in 2013. The film was created as a series pilot for Space, which passed on the series but aired it as a television film.

The film is set in the Canadian Arctic in 2045, after climate change has made the area more temperate and ripe for economic development, and takes place in the newly developing frontier town of Borealis. Its central characters include Ty Olsson as Vic Carbonneau, the owner of the town's airstrip and hotel; Michelle Harrison as Alison Freemont, a biologist; Patrick Gallagher as Taq, an Inuk tech entrepreneur; and Greyston Holt as Dan Riordan, an American anthropology student. The cast also includes Christine Horne, Dewshane Williams, Darren Shahlavi and Mayko Nguyen.

The film was written by Andrew Wreggitt and Andrew Rai Berzins.

== Awards ==
The film received three Directors Guild of Canada award nominations, for Best Direction in a Television Film or Miniseries (Frazee), Best Production Design in a Television Film or Mini-Series (Louise Middleton) and Best Sound Editing in a Television Film or Miniseries (Richard Calistan, Robert Hegedus, Kevin Howard, Nathan Robitaille, Craig MacLellan).

It won three Canadian Screen Awards at the 2nd Canadian Screen Awards in 2014, for Best Dramatic Miniseries or Television Movie, Best Writing in a Dramatic Program or Miniseries (Wreggitt, Berzins), and Best Original Score for a Television Program (Tom Third). It was also nominated, but did not win, for Best Direction in a Dramatic Program or Mini-Series (Frazee) and Best Production Design or Art Direction in a Fiction Program or Series (Bill Ives, Louise Middleton, Paul Healy).
