= SEVEN24 Films =

Canadian television production company

SEVEN24 Films (Alberta Filmworks)
- Industry: Film and television production
- Founded: 1989
- Headquarters: Calgary, Alberta, Canada

SEVEN24 Films (previously known as Alberta Filmworks) is a Canadian television production company based in Calgary, Alberta, Canada. Founded in 1989, SEVEN24 have produced and co-produced a number of television series, TV movies as well as feature films.

== Selected credits ==
=== Television series ===
- North of 60 (1992–1997)
- Tom Stone (2002–2003)
- Shoebox Zoo (2004–2005)
- Heartland (2007–present)
- Dinosapien (2007)
- Wild Roses (2009)
- Young Drunk Punk (2015)
- Wynonna Earp (2016–2021)
- Jann (2019–2021)
- Fortunate Son (2020)
- Family Law (2021–2026)

=== Television films ===
- Dawn Anna (2005)
- The Christmas Blessing (2005)
- Everest '82 (2007)
- Burn Up (2008)
- Mayerthorpe (2008)
- Borealis (2013)
- Gavin Crawford's Wild West (2013)

=== Theatrical films ===
- Brokeback Mountain (2004)
- The Assassination of Jesse James by the Coward Robert Ford (2007)
- Resurrecting the Champ (2007)
