= My Enemy, My Brother =

- Directed by: Ann Shin
- Written by: Ann Shin
- Produced by: Ann Shin
- Starring: Zahed Haftlang; Najah Aboud
- Cinematography: Brendan Uegama
- Edited by: Steve Guise
- Music by: Ari Posner
- Production company: Fathom Film Group
- Distributed by: The New York Times
- Release date: April 17, 2015
- Running time: 18 minutes
- Country: Canada

My Enemy, My Brother is a 2015 Canadian documentary film about two war veterans who met twenty-five years later after the Iran–Iraq War in 1980s. It is directed by Ann Shin and produced by Melanie Horkan, Hannah Donegan and Fathom Film Group. The documentary was well received by critics and earned wide spread critical acclaim. My Enemy, My Brother was shortlisted with ten other documentaries from 74 entries submitted to 88th Academy Awards in Documentary Short Subject category. The final five nominations were scheduled to be announced on January 14, 2016.

== Synopsis ==
In 1982 Zahed was an Iranian boy who ran away from home to join the army. Najah was a 29-year-old Iraqi with a wife and son when he was conscripted to fight. When they meet on the battlefield, Zahed risks his life to save Najah. Twenty-five years later they meet again by sheer chance in Canada.

== Web series and feature film ==
The documentary is scheduled to be developed in web series as well as feature film with the web-episode airing every Tuesday.

== Accolades ==
- Canadian Screen Awards - Best Cinematography in a Documentary (nominee)
- SXSW Interactive Award
- FITC Award
- Premio Un Film per la Pace 2016
- San Diego Asian Film Festival 2017- Grand Jury Award
