= Intervention Canada =

- Genre: Documentary
- Country of origin: Canada
- Original language: English
- No. of seasons: 2
- No. of episodes: 27

Production
- Running time: 43 minutes
- Production companies: Open Door Co. & Insight Productions

Original release
- Network: Slice (2011-2012); T+E (2019-present)
- Release: September 9, 2011 – present

Intervention Canada is a Canadian documentary television series based on the A&E series Intervention. The series premiered on Slice on September 9, 2011.

The series profiles people whose dependence on drugs and alcohol or other compulsive behavior has brought them to a point of personal crisis or estranged them from their friends and loved ones. Each episode ends with a surprise intervention that is staged by the family and friends of the addict, conducted by addiction specialists.

The series ran for two seasons aired between 2011 and 2012. On February 9, 2012, Slice had announced on Facebook that the show was canceled. Despite this, a casting call for the series was posted on November 27, 2015. On June 27, 2018, Blue Ant Media announced the series would return in March 2019 on T+E.

The third season premiered on April 1, 2019.

== Interventionists ==
- Andrew Galloway (Season 1 & 2)
- Maureen Brine (Season 1 & 2)
- Joey Marcelli (Season 2)
- Sue Donaldson (Season 2)
