= Ken Girotti =

Canadian television director

- Occupation: Director
- Spouse: Wendy Lyon
- Children: 1

Ken Girotti is a Canadian television director who was nominated for a 2006 Gemini Award in the category "Best Direction in a Dramatic Series" for the TV series ReGenesis.

== Career ==
He was director of the 2008 television film Mayerthorpe, for which he won a Directors Guild of Canada award and was nominated for the Gemini Award for Best Direction in a Dramatic Program or Miniseries at the 23rd Gemini Awards in 2008.

He directed episode 9 of the first season of Supernatural. He directed episodes 3 and 4 of the second season of Vikings in 2014.

He was a producer on the series Anne with an E. For Pure he was a season second two director and also served as a second season executive director in 2018. He directed an episode of the drug trafficking drama Pure in 2019. He was a director and consulting producer for Fortunate Son.

== As director ==
Girotti has directed one, two or more episodes of:

- Vikings
- Killjoys
- Being Erica
- Haven
- Supernatural
- Law & Order: Criminal Intent
- Rescue Me
- Stargate SG-1
- Soul Food
- The Outer Limits
- First Wave
- La Femme Nikita
- Psi Factor: Chronicles of the Paranormal
- Orphan Black
- Daredevil
- Saving Hope
- The Crossing
- Nurses
- Fortunate Son
- FBI
- FBI: Most Wanted
- CIA
- Law & Order: Organized Crime
- Burn Notice
