= Rick Roberts (actor) =

Canadian actor (born 1965)

- Born: Richard Charles Roberts; November 13, 1965 (age 60); Hamilton, Ontario, Canada
- Occupation: Actor
- Years active: 1990–present

Richard Charles Roberts (born November 13, 1965) is a Canadian actor. He is known for his work in various films and television.

== Early life ==
Roberts was born in Hamilton, Ontario. He grew up in Edmonton, Alberta. He studied acting at the National Theatre School of Canada in Montreal, graduating in 1991.

== Career ==
Roberts played Donald D'Arby in the series Traders, for which he was nominated for a Gemini Award. He moved briefly to Los Angeles in 1998 appearing in the CBS series L.A. Doctors alongside Ken Olin and Sheryl Lee. Roberts returned to Canada to star in An American in Canada, which ran for two seasons.

Most recently, Roberts was featured in Michael McGowan's series Between, guest starred opposite Kim Cattrall in Sensitive Skin (TMN/Movie Central), appeared in Zoom (Pedro Morelli), God and Country (Ken Finkleman) and the miniseries The Book of Negroes (CBC).

Other work includes guest starring roles on Saving Hope (CTV/NBC), Copper (BBC America), Cracked (CBC), Republic of Doyle (CBC), Murdoch Mysteries (CBC), Cra$h & Burn (Showcase), Haven (SyFy), ZOS (Whizbang Films), and was featured regularly in the hit CBC series, This is Wonderland.

Roberts played Dennis MacDonald on Family's Life with Derek, and the role of explorer John Rae in the 2008 docudrama Passage. He also played the role of Jim Jones in Jonestown: Paradise Lost which aired on the History Channel and the Discovery Channel. He also played the evil Brooks Oliver in Eloise at Christmastime.

In 2012, he was tapped to play Jack Layton in the CBC biopic Jack, alongside Sook-Yin Lee as Olivia Chow. Jack garnered him a Canadian Screen Award and an ACTRA Award for Best Actor.

He played Matthew in the CBC series This Life.

=== Theatre ===
A popular fixture on Canadian stages, Roberts headlined the Tarragon Theatre hit Enemy of the People, as well as The Accidental Death of an Anarchist and Waiting for Godot for Soulpepper Theatre Company. Additional theatre credits include the Belfry Theatre's production of Proud, Tuesdays with Morrie, and he made his Stratford Festival debut in the title role of Zastrozzi.

=== Writing ===
As a writer, Roberts' work Mimi (which he co-wrote with Allan Cole and Melody Johnson) premiered at The Tarragon Theatre and was nominated for a Dora Award. His play Kite premiered to critical acclaim earning numerous Dora Award nominations for writing and production. Other writing credits include Nod (Theatre Gargantua) and Fish/Wife (Tarragon Theatre)

== Personal life ==
Roberts is married to Marjorie Campbell; they have two sons.

== Filmography ==
| Year | Title | Role | Notes |
|---|---|---|---|
| 1997 | Time to Say Goodbye? | Chip Klooster | |
| 2001 | A Town Without Christmas | David Reynolds | |
| 2002 | Puppets Who Kill | Telethon Host | 1 episode |
| 2002–2003 | An American in Canada | Jake Crewe | 16 episodes |
| 2003 | Fallen Angel | Charles Wentworth, Age 30 | TV |
| 2003 | Eloise at Christmastime | Brooks Oliver | TV |
| 2003 | Student Seduction | Drew Dawson | TV |
| 2005–2006 | This Is Wonderland | Cameron Tiernay | 6 episodes |
| 2005 | Haunting Sarah | Edgar Lewis | TV |
| 2005 | Plague City: SARS in Toronto | Dr. Jeremy Neville | TV |
| 2005 | Descent | Dr. Palmer Drake | TV |
| 2005 | Kevin Hill | D. A. Miller | 1 episode |
| 2005 | The Eleventh Hour | Ian Bannerman | 1 episode |
| 2005 | More Sex & the Single Mom | Steve | TV |
| 2005–2011 | Carl² | Barney Crashman | TV |
| 2006 | Life with Derek | Dennis MacDonald | 1 episode |
| 2006 | Shades of Black: The Conrad Black Story | Morde | TV |
| 2006 | Angela's Eyes | Gene Taylor | 7 episodes |
| 2006 | Man of the Year | Hemmings | |
| 2006 | At the Hotel | Nervous Affair Man | 1 episode |
| 2006 | Night of Terror | Sean Dunne | TV |
| 2007 | Jonestown: Paradise Lost | Jim Jones | TV |
| 2007 | The Note | Truman | TV |
| 2007 | Matters of Life and Dating | | TV |
| 2007 | The Company | 3 episodes | |
| 2008 | Passage | John Rae | |
| 2008 | Phantom Punch | Father Alios | |
| 2008 | Pontypool | Ken Loney | voice |
| 2008 | Murdoch Mysteries | Dr. Gilbert Birkins | 1 episode |
| 2009 | ZOS: Zone of Separation | | 8 episodes |
| 2009 | Pure Evil | Frank | TV |
| 2009–2010 | Cra$h & Burn | Jay Pound | 6 episodes |
| 2010 | The Reception | Kent | |
| 2010 | When Love Is Not Enough: The Lois Wilson Story | Frank Shaw | TV |
| 2010 | The Night Before the Night Before Christmas | Wayne Fox | TV |
| 2010 | The Town Christmas Forgot | Charles Benson | |
| 2012 | Perception | Philip Klane | TV |
| 2012 | Still Mine | John | |
| 2013 | Jack | Jack Layton | |
| 2013 | Relax, I'm from the Future | Percy | Short film |
| 2015 | Killer Crush | Dr. Lucas Emery | TV film |
| 2015 | Between | | TV Episode 1 |
| 2016 | Sensitive Skin | David | |
| 2018 | Ghost BFF | Mr. Emerson | 4 episodes |
| 2018 | Designated Survivor | General | 4 episodes |
| 2019 | Coroner | Gerald Henry Jones | 2 episodes |
| 2019 | Such a Small Thing | Dove's Dad | |
| 2020 | Fortunate Son | Ted Howard | Series regular |
| 2021 | Frankie Drake Mysteries | Keith Campbell | Episode: "Scavenger Hunt" |
| 2021 | North of Albany (Au nord d'Albany) | Paul | |
| 2021 | Far Cry 6 | Sean McKay | Video Game |
| 2021 | All My Puny Sorrows | Elder | |
| 2024 | The Light Before the Sun | Freddie | Short film |

== Awards and nominations ==
| Year | Award | Category | Work | Result | Ref |
|---|---|---|---|---|---|
| 1998 | Gemini Awards | Best Performance by an Actor in a Featured Supporting Role in a Dramatic Series | Traders | Nominated | |
| 2003 | Gemini Awards | Best Ensemble Performance in a Comedy Program or Series | An American in Canada | Nominated | |
| 2003 | ACTRA Toronto Awards | Outstanding Performance - Male | An American in Canada | Nominated | |
| 2004 | Dora Awards | Outstanding Performance by a Male in a Principal Role - Play | Hotel Loopy | Nominated | |
| 2005 | Dora Awards | Outstanding Performance by a Male | Outstanding Performance by a Male | Nominated | |
| 2005 | Dora Awards | Outstanding New Play or Musical | Kite | Nominated | |
| 2007 | Dora Awards | Outstanding Performance by a Male in a Principal Role - Play | John and Beatrice | Nominated | |
| 2008 | Dora Awards | Outstanding Performance by a Male in a Principal Role - Musical | Fire | Nominated | |
| 2009 | Dora Awards | Outstanding New Play or Musical (shared with Brendan Gall, Mike McPhaden & Julie Tepperman) | The Gladstone Variations | Nominated | |
| 2010 | Dora Awards | Outstanding New Musical or Opera (shared with Allen Cole, Melody Johnson) | Mimi | Nominated | |
| 2014 | Canadian Screen Awards | Best Performance in a Guest Role, Dramatic Series | Cracked | Nominated | |
| 2014 | Canadian Screen Awards | Best Performance by an Actor in a Leading Role in a Dramatic Program or Mini-Series | Jack | Won | |
| 2014 | ACTRA Toronto Awards | Outstanding Performance - Male | Jack | Won | |
