= Maïna =

- Film poster
- Directed by: Michel Poulette
- Written by: Pierre Billon
- Starring: Roseanne Supernault; Graham Greene; Tantoo Cardinal; Eric Schweig; Natar Ungalaaq
- Cinematography: Allen Smith
- Edited by: Denis Papillon
- Music by: Michel Cusson; Kim Gaboury
- Release dates: 16 June 2013 (Shanghai International Film Festival); 1 October 2013
- Running time: 100 minutes
- Country: Canada
- Languages: Inuktitut; Innu; English; French

Maïna is a 2013 Canadian drama film, directed by Michel Poulette. An adaptation of Dominique Demers' novel, the film stars Roseanne Supernault.

== Plot ==
Maïna, Innu chief Mishtenapuu's daughter, embarks on a quest into Inuit territory to rescue Nipki, a young boy from her community captured by the Inuit following a battle.

== Cast ==
The film's cast includes Graham Greene as Maïna's father as well as Tantoo Cardinal, Eric Schweig and Natar Ungalaaq.

- Roseanne Supernault as Maïna
- Ipellie Ootoova as Natak
- Uapeshkuss Thernish as Nipki
- Graham Greene as Mishtenapeu
- Tantoo Cardinal as Tekahera
- Eric Schweig as Quujuuq
- Natar Ungalaaq as Tadio
- Flint Eagle as Saitu

== Accolades ==
The film was named Best Picture at the 2013 American Indian Film Festival, and Supernault was named Best Actress. The film also garnered six Canadian Screen Award nominations at the 2nd Canadian Screen Awards, including Best Picture, Best Art Direction/Production Design, Best Cinematography (Allen Smith), Best Costume Design, Best Original Score and Best Make-Up.
