= Seed (TV series) =

- Genre: Sitcom
- Created by: Joseph Raso
- Starring: Adam Korson; Carrie-Lynn Neales; Amanda Brugel; Stephanie Anne Mills; Laura de Carteret; Matt Baram; Vanessa Matsui; Abby Ross; William Ainscough
- Country of origin: Canada
- Original language: English
- No. of seasons: 2
- No. of episodes: 26

Production
- Executive producers: Joseph Raso; Mark Farrell; John Ritchie; Rob Bromley; Gillian Lowrey
- Production locations: Halifax, Nova Scotia, Canada
- Camera setup: Single-camera
- Running time: 22 minutes
- Production company: Force Four Entertainment

Original release
- Network: City
- Release: February 4, 2013 – June 5, 2014

Seed is a Canadian single-camera sitcom television series. The series starred Adam Korson as Harry Dacosta, sperm donor, and followed his interactions with new-found relatives who had been conceived from the donation.

The series premiered on February 4, 2013 on Citytv, and was briefly picked up by the U.S. CW network (however, it was removed after two episodes due to low ratings). In 2014, the series was cancelled by Citytv after two seasons.

== Synopsis ==
An ill-equipped bachelor discovers his foray into sperm donation has resulted in many offspring and finds himself entangled in the lives of his new-found children and their less-than-thrilled families.

== Characters ==
- Adam Korson as Harry Dacosta, a bartender who donated semen. In his profile, numbered XC-3000, he notes he is a doctor and a graduate of Princeton.
- Carrie-Lynn Neales as Rose, who meets Harry on a bus on the way to the fertility clinic, as she wants to get pregnant, but doesn't want a relationship.
- Amanda Brugel as Michelle, one of Billy's mothers.
- Stephanie Anne Mills as Zoey, one of Billy's mothers.
- Laura de Carteret as Janet, Anastasia's mother and a child psychologist.
- Matt Baram as Jonathan, Anastasia's (non-biological) father and a lawyer.
- Vanessa Matsui as Irene, Harry's boss, and owner of the Pour House Bar.
- Abby Ross as Anastasia, Harry's 15-year-old daughter. She recently found out her parents used a sperm donor and that Jonathan is not her biological father.
- William Ainscough as Billy Jones-Krasnoff, Harry's nine-year-old son. He lives with his two moms, Michelle and Zoey.

== Production ==
Principal photography began on the first season of Seed in October 2012 in Halifax, Nova Scotia.

Although the show's premise closely resembles the 2011 Canadian film Starbuck, producer Joseph Raso has clarified in interviews that he already had the idea in development before Starbuck was released.

== Reception ==
The Globe and Mail called the series "deeply silly, and the kind of good, off-kilter comedy that we can do with aplomb in Canada... There's no recipe, but among the requirements are characters who are fabulously immature, plus some sharp, unostentatious writing and a version of stoner humour that works even if you're not five miles high."

In 2013, the series was picked up for U.S. broadcast by The CW. However, on July 23, 2014, the network pulled the show from its schedule after two airings due to low ratings.

== Episodes ==
=== Series overview ===
| Season | Episodes | Originally aired | |
| Season | Episodes | First aired | Last aired |
|---|---|---|---|
| 1 | 13 | February 4, 2013 | April 29, 2013 |
| 2 | 13 | March 6, 2014 | June 5, 2014 |

=== Season 1 (2013) ===
| No. overall | No. in season | Title | Directed by | Written by | Original release date |
|---|---|---|---|---|---|
| 1 | 1 | "Ill Conceived" | James Genn | Joseph Raso | February 4, 2013 |
Billy comes to Harry's apartment and reveals he is his son resulting from sperm donation. As soon as he finds out who his parents are, Harry brings Billy back to them. Harry is visited by Anastasia, who is also a result of his sperm donation. While meeting her parents, Harry encourages her to go to a party, where she wants to have sex with her boyfriend. Meanwhile, Harry schedules an anonymous sex date with Rose, a woman he met in the bus, and who wants no strings attached sex in order to get pregnant. Despite having him called a “fourth wheel”, Michelle and Zoey ask Harry to talk to Billy because of a fight at school. When Harry finds out Anastasia is at a "lipstick party", he drives there together with Billy's and Anastasia's parents. After unintentionally outing Anastasia boyfriend as gay, he brings her home, making him late for his sex date.
| 2 | 2 | "Zygote Problems" | James Genn | Joseph Raso | February 11, 2013 |
Harry helps Billy's moms, Zoey and Michelle, to encourage Billy to be cooler at school. Meanwhile Jonathan and Janet fear their daughter Anastasia may be failing French, and administer an I.Q. test to Harry, fearing she got the 'dumb gene' from him. Harry and Rose square off about the future of her potential child.
| 3 | 3 | "The Rhythmic Gymnastic Method" | James Dunnison | Jenn Engels | February 18, 2013 |
Harry signs Billy up for Rhythmic Gymnastics, so that Harry can hook up with the hot new gymnastics teacher. Meanwhile Jonathan offers Harry $5000 to disappear from his daughter's life. Rose strikes up a friendship with Irene, who Harry fears will tell Rose all of Harry's dirty secrets.
| 4 | 4 | "The Ultrasound and the Fury" | James Dunnison | Jeff Detsky | February 25, 2013 |
It's fashion week, and Harry's scheduled once-a-year hookup with a hot fashion model will be the exact afternoon as Rose's ultrasound, a milestone that Harry doesn't want to miss. Meanwhile Jonathan discovers that Anastasia has revealed her sperm-donor roots to her entire school, and Harry inadvertently teaches Billy how to judge people on appearance.
| 5 | 5 | "Birth of a Salesman" | James Genn | Mark Farrell | March 4, 2013 |
Zoey pressures Billy to become the best at his school's grapefruit sales competition. Billy seeks help from Luke, the 18-year-old who's dating Anastasia, who has all the character traits of Harry. Meanwhile Anastasia pawns off her homework on Rose, who tests her maternal instincts on an electronic baby.
| 6 | 6 | "Corner Orifice" | James Dunnison | Mike McPhaden | March 11, 2013 |
When Rose competes for a big promotion at work, Harry recommends that she hide her pregnancy for the sake of her career. Janet lets slip to Harry that she and Jonathan schedule their sex life, and when Jonathan finds out, he cuts his wife off. Meanwhile Billy and Zoey's nighttime fears are realized when they discover their home has been broken into.
| 7 | 7 | "Fetal Attraction" | James Dunnison | Mark Farrell & Joseph Raso | March 18, 2013 |
Harry can't believe that Rose is actively dating while pregnant, and he tries to uncover the true motives of her new, super-hot boyfriend. Meanwhile Anastasia discovers that Jonathan is “part of the establishment,” and wants nothing to do with her father's wealth and lifestyle. Billy gives Harry lice, and Harry capitalizes on Zoey and Michelle's guilt.
| 8 | 8 | "Bromozomes" | James Genn | Jenn Engels | March 25, 2013 |
When Janet diagnoses Harry with Sympathetic Pregnancy, Rose finds that she's competing for sympathy with her new, narcissistic belly-buddy, Harry. Meanwhile Zoey and Michelle rejoice after finding a babysitter (Leah Feidh Fassett) Harry can't hit on – because she's a lesbian. Janet discovers Jonathan has been seeing another therapist behind her back, Dr. Meinertzhagen (guest star Tom Green).
| 9 | 9 | "Rebel Without Lamaze" | James Genn | Jeff Detsky | April 1, 2013 |
As a former nerd, Rose worries that her Lamaze class will be high school all over again. Fortunately Harry thrived in high school, and is ready to help out. Meanwhile, Anastasia plans for her own school's formal dance, and her parents each try to capture the few parent-child milestones they have left. Michelle and Harry realize that they dated the same woman years ago.
| 10 | 10 | "Womb-Mates" | Ron Murphy | Jenn Engels | April 8, 2013 |
When Rose needs a place to stay, Harry reluctantly agrees to put her up, but soon finds that Rose has a video-game playing, junk-food eating bachelor side he never knew. Meanwhile, Zoey reveals she never told her grandmother she was gay- or married to Michelle- just as old Baba pays a visit. Janet goes behind Jonathan's back in her strategy to get a good deal on a new car.
| 11 | 11 | "The Sperm Whale" | Ron Murphy | Jennifer Daley & Joseph Raso | May 15, 2013 |
When Harry runs into a woman he's desired for ages, he tells her that he's married to Rose – it's the only thing that turns this home-wrecker on. Meanwhile, Jonathan and Janet create a fake social media account to connect with their daughter. And when Michelle believes that Harry may be objectifying and ogling Zoey, she pressures him to be more of a gentleman.
| 12 | 12 | "Always Use a Condo" | Ron Murphy | Jon Davis & Joseph Raso | May 22, 2013 |
As Harry and Rose prepare for a pre-school interview, Harry learns that Rose lied on the application, covering up what she perceives as Harry's biggest flaws. Meanwhile, Michelle and Zoey realize that Billy is old enough for “The Talk,” but can't agree on how to go about it. Janet and Jonathan leave their home empty, and Harry takes advantage of their absence.
| 13 | 13 | "At Your Cervix" | Ron Murphy | Jennifer Daley & Joseph Raso | May 29, 2013 |
While rehearsing for her labour, Rose grows frustrated with Harry's abilities as a 'birthing partner.' Meanwhile, Zoey and Michelle decide whether now is the best time for them to have another child of their own. Anastasia feels betrayed when she finds out that Jonathan wasn't there for her own birth.The season ends with Harry meeting Linda (form the 1st episode) to whom he asks "how long it has been ? ". She answers by saying "About 9 months" and is pregnant .

=== Season 2 (2014) ===
| No. overall | No. in season | Title | Directed by | Written by | Original release date |
|---|---|---|---|---|---|
| 14 | 1 | "The Second Coming" | James Genn | Joseph Raso | March 6, 2014 |
Harry gives Billy love advice, but can't follow his own tips when he discovers he has feelings for Rose.
| 15 | 2 | "Consenting Adults" | James Genn | Mark Farrell | March 13, 2014 |
To everyone's surprise Harry turns down dates with several women, only to agree to one that costs him a chance with Rose.
| 16 | 3 | "To Breed Or Not To Breed" | James Dunnison | Jennifer Daley | March 20, 2014 |
When Harry changes his mind about helping Michelle and Zoey conceive, they have to decide how much they really want another baby.
| 17 | 4 | "Safe Sects" | James Dunnison | Joseph Raso & Mark Farrell | March 27, 2014 |
Harry shirks babysitting duty during Rose's 'sex date' with her new boyfriend, while Billy and Zoey prepare to celebrate Gaia Day.
| 18 | 5 | "Getting Tail" | James Genn | Mike McPhaden | April 3, 2014 |
Harry becomes jealous of Billy and Jonathan's new bond, while Rose tries to spice things up with Bruce.
| 19 | 6 | "Mall My Children" | James Genn | Jenn Engels & Mike McPhaden | April 10, 2014 |
Rose tries to put Harry's 'single dad powers' to good use, while Michelle, Zoey, Janet and Jonathan confront their bedroom fantasies.
| 20 | 7 | "Mother Sucker" | James Dunnison | Jenn Engels | April 24, 2014 |
Harry and Rose lie to keep Rose's judgemental mom happy, while Michelle and Zoey ask Jonathan for help preparing their wills. Shannon Tweed guest stars.
| 21 | 8 | "The Bjorn Identity" | James Dunnison | Kate Hewlett | May 1, 2014 |
Harry conquers a dating obstacle that brings Rose´s insecurities to the fore; at the same time, Michelle and Billy find themselves drawn into Zoey's war on sugar. Anastasia joins the debate team at another school with interesting consequences.
| 22 | 9 | "Et Tattoo Bruté?" | James Allodi | Jon Davis & Joseph Raso | May 8, 2014 |
Harry hopes to raise the families' opinion of him by introducing them to his delinquent big brother Frank, but Harry realizes he may be the family black sheep after Frank charms everyone. Janet tries to prevent Anastasia from getting a tattoo.
| 23 | 10 | "Drool Me Once" | Ron Murphy | Jon Davis & Joseph Raso | May 15, 2014 |
Harry and Rose are at odds when Charlie isn't meeting his 'milestones' fast enough, while Janet and Jonathan try to deal with Anastasia's tattooed new boyfriend.
| 24 | 11 | "Baby Doctor Strangelove" | James Allodi | Jennifer Daley & Joseph Raso | May 22, 2014 |
Rose is annoyed when Harry dates baby Charlie's new pediatrician, but she quickly realizes the benefits of having a doctor on call.
| 25 | 12 | "Premature Driver's Education" | Ron Murphy | Mike McPhaden | May 29, 2014 |
Harry tries not to panic when he and his new girlfriend reach a landmark date, while Janet and Jonathan panic freely (then lie about it) while trying to teach Anastasia how to drive.
| 26 | 13 | "Thanks for Coming" | Joseph Raso | Joseph Raso & Jennifer Daley | June 5, 2014 |
Rose discovers she has feelings for Harry, while the families are torn when they find out Harry might not be Billy and Anastasia's real sperm dad. Jonathan Torrens guest stars.

== Home release ==
Entertainment One Films released Season One on DVD in Region 1 on October 21, 2014.
