= The Defector: Escape from North Korea =

2012 film by Ann Shin

- Directed by: Ann Shin
- Release date: 2012
- Country: Canada
- Languages: English, Korean

The Defector: Escape from North Korea is a 2012 documentary film about North Korean defectors, directed by Korean-Canadian filmmaker Ann Shin. The film premiered at the Hot Docs Canadian International Documentary Festival and had its broadcast premiere on TVOntario on June 26. The film's release was accompanied by The Defector Interactive, an interactive documentary that uses a videogame-like approach to let the user find out about life in and escape from North Korea. That the film opened at International Documentary Film Festival (IDFA) of Amsterdam, and went on to play at numerous of festivals, winning three Canadian Screen Awards: Best Documentary, Best Documentary Director and the Diversity Award.
