= Michel Poulette =

Canadian film and television director, writer and producer

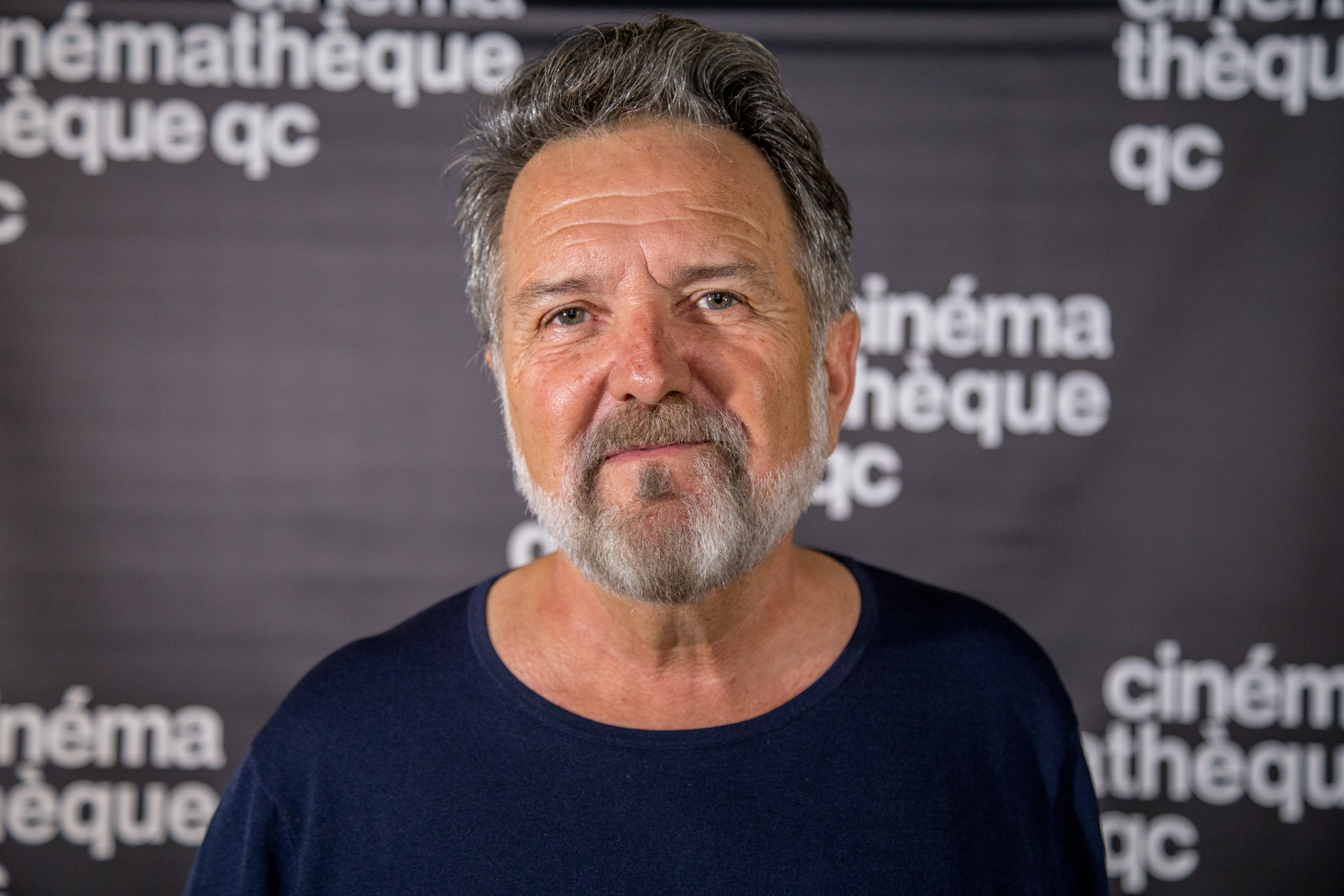
Portrait of the director and producer Michel Poulette made during the opening night of the Women cycle at the Cinémathèque québécoise.

Michel Poulette is a Canadian film and television director, writer and producer. He won the Claude Jutra Award in 1994 for his first feature film, Louis 19, King of the Airwaves (Louis 19, le roi des ondes), which became the first American remake of a Canadian movie: ED TV by Ron Howard.

== Career ==
Poulette directed his first film, Louis 19, in 1994, to positive reviews, and then was a director for the sketch comedy series Rock et Belles Oreilles. In 1997 his detective film The Haven was released.

Poulette went on to direct the feature films The Caretaker's Lodge (La Conciergerie) and Family History (Histoire de famille). He directed the film Maïna in 2014; it was nominated for a Canadian Screen Award and screened at a number of film festivals.

In 1999 he directed the television film Bonanno: A Godfather's Story, which received mixed reviews, and in 2003 the spy story Agent of Influence. He also directed Tipping Point and Too Young to Marry, and episodes of the television series Urgence, MVP, and Sophie.

Poulette worked for several television networks, directed a number of commercials, and has been awarded five "campaign of the year" awards in TV advertising. He has also directed video for the videogame industry, with Myst IV: Revelation and the first trailer of Assassin's Creed. Both for Ubisoft.
