= Tom Stone (TV series) =

Television series

- Created by: Andrew Wreggitt
- Starring: Chris William Martin; Janet Kidder; Stuart Margolin; Art Hindle
- Country of origin: Canada
- No. of seasons: 2
- No. of episodes: 26

Production
- Production locations: Calgary, Alberta, Canada
- Running time: 60 minutes
- Production company: SEVEN24 Films

Original release
- Network: CBC Television
- Release: March 25, 2002 – May 1, 2004

Tom Stone is a crime drama series that ran in Canada on CBC Television for two 13-episode seasons beginning on March 25, 2002. In the United States, the series is syndicated by PPI Releasing and Sony Pictures Television under the title Stone Undercover.

== Overview ==
The hour-long series, set on location in Calgary and the surrounding Alberta area, stars Chris William Martin in the title role, a roguish character with a colorful past. He is a cop, an oil rigger and an ex-con. His background provides the ingredients the Royal Canadian Mounted Police need to help them in solving cases that require an outsider.

Assisting him in these assignments is RCMP Corporal Marina Di Luzio (Janet Kidder), a female by-the-book type commercial crime specialist who has an on again-off again friction with the unconventional Stone, which also carries over into the cases they're assigned to. In addition, there is also Tom's American scotch-and-cigar smoking buddy, Jack Welsh (Stuart Margolin). Canadian actor Art Hindle also had a recurring role as Neil McQuinn, a shady but well connected businessman.

The series was commonly compared by television critics to a Canadian version of The Rockford Files. Series creator Andrew Wreggitt openly acknowledged that he was influenced by that show, as well as Northern Exposure and North of 60.

== Episodes ==
=== Season 1 (2002) ===
No. overall	No. in season	Title	Directed by	Written by	Original release date
1	1	"For the Money:Part 1"	Unknown	Unknown	February 25, 2002
2	2	"For the Money:Part 2"	Unknown	Unknown	February 25, 2002
3	3	"Solidarity Forever"	Unknown	Unknown	March 4, 2002
4	4	"Good Cop, Bad Cop"	Unknown	Unknown	March 11, 2002
5	5	"Sunny Side of the Street"	Unknown	Unknown	March 18, 2002
6	6	"The Man Who Knew Too Much"	Unknown	Unknown	March 25, 2002

=== Season 2 (2002–03) ===
No. overall	No. in season	Title	Directed by	Written by	Original release date
14	1	"Deal"	Unknown	Unknown	November 3, 2002
15	2	"The Last Go Round"	Unknown	Unknown	November 10, 2002
16	3	"Cold Comfort"	Unknown	Unknown	November 17, 2002
17	4	"Royalty"	Unknown	Unknown	December 1, 2002
18	5	"The Grand Alliance"	Unknown	Unknown	December 8, 2002
19	6	"Water"	Unknown	Unknown	December 22, 2002
20	7	"Live by the Sword"	Unknown	Unknown	January 12, 2003
21	8	"Pants on Fire"	Unknown	Unknown	January 19, 2003
22	9	"Busted Shoulder"	Unknown	Unknown	January 26, 2003
23	10	"It's All Fun and Games"	Unknown	Unknown	February 2, 2003
