= Vancouver Film Critics Circle Award for Best Canadian Documentary =

Canadian film award

The Vancouver Film Critics Circle Award for Best Canadian Documentary Film is an annual award, presented by the Vancouver Film Critics Circle to the film judged by its members as the best Canadian documentary film of the year. It is separate from the Vancouver Film Critics Circle Award for Best Documentary, presented to international documentary films.

== Winners and nominees ==
=== 2010s ===
Year	Film	Director	Ref.
2012	The World Before Her	Nisha Pahuja	
2012	The End of Time	Peter Mettler	
2012	Stories We Tell	Sarah Polley	
2013	My Prairie Home	Chelsea McMullan	
2013	Oil Sands Karaoke	Charles Wilkinson	
2013	Watermark	Jennifer Baichwal, Edward Burtynsky	
2014	The Price We Pay	Harold Crooks	
2014	Everything Will Be	Julia Kwan	
2014	Just Eat It: A Food Waste Story	Grant Baldwin	
2015	Haida Gwaii: On the Edge of the World	Charles Wilkinson	
2015	Fractured Land	Fiona Rayher, Damien Gillis	
2015	How to Change the World	Jerry Rothwell	
2015	Hurt	Alan Zweig	
2016	The Prison in Twelve Landscapes	Brett Story	
2016	After the Last River	Victoria Lean	
2016	We Can't Make the Same Mistake Twice	Alanis Obomsawin	
2017	Maison du Bonheur	Sofia Bohdanowicz	
2017	In the Waves	Jacquelyn Mills	
2017	A Skin So Soft (Ta peau si lisse)	Denis Côté	
2017	Unarmed Verses	Charles Officer	
2018	Anthropocene: The Human Epoch	Jennifer Baichwal, Nicholas de Pencier, Edward Burtynsky	
2018	The Museum of Forgotten Triumphs	Bojan Bodružić	
2018	What Is Democracy?	Astra Taylor	
2019	nîpawistamâsowin: We Will Stand Up	Tasha Hubbard	
2019	Because We Are Girls	Baljit Sangra	
2019	Danny	Lewis Bennett, Aaron Zeghers	

=== 2020s ===
Year	Film	Director	Ref.
2020	The New Corporation: The Unfortunately Necessary Sequel	Jennifer Abbott, Joel Bakan	
2020	The Forbidden Reel	Ariel Nasr	
2020	The Magnitude of All Things	Jennifer Abbott	
2021	Kímmapiiyipitssini: The Meaning of Empathy	Elle-Máijá Tailfeathers	
2021	The Last Tourist	Tyson Sadler	
2021	The Six	Arthur Jones	
2022	Eternal Spring	Jason Loftus	
2022	Black Ice	Hubert Davis	
2022	Dear Audrey	Jeremiah Hayes	
2023	Satan Wants You	Steve J. Adams, Sean Horlor	
2023	Mr. Dressup: The Magic of Make-Believe	Robert McCallum	
2023	To Kill a Tiger	Nisha Pahuja	
2024	Sugarcane	Julian Brave NoiseCat, Emily Kassie	
2024	Any Other Way: The Jackie Shane Story	Michael Mabbott, Lucah Rosenberg-Lee	
2024	Ari's Theme	Nathan Drillot, Jeff Lee Petry	
2024	Blue Rodeo: Lost Together	Dale Heslip	
2024	The Movie Man	Matt Finlin	
2025	Modern Whore	Nicole Bazuin	
2025	Forward	Nic Collar	
2025	Lunatic: The Luna Vachon Story	Kate Kroll	
