= CBC Docs POV =

Canadian television series

- Genre: Documentary
- Country of origin: Canada
- No. of seasons: 6
- No. of episodes: 83

Production
- Running time: 60 minutes

Original release
- Network: CBC Television
- Release: October 22, 2015 – September 21, 2021

CBC Docs POV is a Canadian television point-of-view documentary series that aired on CBC Television. The series premiered in fall 2015 under the title Firsthand, replacing Doc Zone, after the CBC discontinued its internal documentary production unit, and was renamed CBC Docs POV in 2017. The series airs one documentary film each week, commissioned from external producers rather than being produced directly by the CBC; some, but not all, films screened as part of the series have also had longer versions separately released as theatrical feature documentaries.

Repeat airings of the series have also sometimes included films which were originally broadcast as part of Doc Zone.

The CBC announced in 2021 that it would not commission further documentaries under the CBC Docs POV brand, instead merging all documentary broadcasts into The Passionate Eye.

== Episodes ==
=== Firsthand, Season 1 ===
No.	Title	Directed by	Original release date
1	"The Woman Who Joined the Taliban"	Kai Lawrence	October 15, 2015
A profile of Beverly Giesbrecht, a Canadian woman who joined the Taliban to fight in the War in Afghanistan.
2	"Hold Your Fire"	Helen Slinger	October 22, 2015
An exploration of police response to incidents of people in mental health crisis, delving into the reasons why such incidents frequently end in shootings.
3	"Reefer Riches"	Cynthia Banks	October 29, 2015
A portrait of the transition toward legalization of marijuana, highlighting the experiences of the U.S. states of Colorado and Washington.
4	"Forever Young"	Geoff D'Eon	November 4, 2015
An exploration of the human quest to extend our lives toward the horizon of immortality.
5	"IF, the Poet"	Kim Saltarski	November 12, 2015
Portrait of Canadian slam poet Ian French.
6	"The Oka Legacy"	Sonia Boileau	November 19, 2015
An examination of the legacy of the Oka Crisis of 1990, and its effects both on Boileau as an individual and on the wider community.
7	"Omar Khadr: Out of the Shadows"	Patrick Reed, Michelle Shephard	December 2, 2015
Shorter television edition of their feature documentary Guantanamo's Child.
8	"Cowboy Up"	Judith Pyke	January 4, 2016
A portrait of Alberta farm families involved in the rodeo circuit.
9	"Girls' Night Out"	Phyllis Ellis	February 25, 2016
An examination of the alcohol consumption habits of women, and the reasons why binge drinking has increased much more rapidly among women than men in recent years.
10	"Looking for Mike"	Dylan Reibling	March 3, 2016
After the sudden death of his former colleague Michael de Bourcier at age 33 leads to the revelation that the man was living under an assumed identity, the filmmaker tries to investigate the mystery of who his friend really was.
11	"I, Pedophile"	Matthew Campea, Robin Benger	March 10, 2016
A portrait of two men who struggle with sexual attractions to children, exploring whether social stigmas around talking about the issue make it more difficult for a person struggling with it to get compassionate treatment, and thus increase their risk of actually committing a sexual offense.
12	"The War at Home"	Shelley Saywell	March 17, 2016
An examination of domestic violence against women, delving into problems within the law enforcement and legal systems that make it difficult to combat.
13	"A Jihadi in the Family"	Eileen Thalenberg	March 24, 2016
Profile of a woman in Calgary whose son was radicalized by the Islamic State of Iraq and the Levant over the internet, and died in 2014 while fighting in Syria.
14	"Perfect"	Jérémie Battaglia	August 4, 2016
A profile of the Canadian synchronized swimming team in preparation for the 2016 Summer Olympics.

=== Firsthand, Season 2 ===
No.	Title	Directed by	Original release date
1	"Road to Mercy"	Nadine Pequeneza	October 6, 2016
An exploration of the ethical implications of medically assisted death.
2	"Being Greene"	Jeff Newman	October 13, 2016
Portrait of the Greenes, a Manitoba family with a history of mental health issues.
3	"Inside These Walls"	Juliet Lammers, Lorraine Price	October 20, 2016
The family of Chinese dissident Wang Bingzhang struggles to secure his release from Chinese prison.
4	"Sugar Sisters: Confessions of a Sugar Baby"	Hannah Donegan	October 27, 2016
Two sisters, struggling financially, decide to experiment with dating sugar daddies.
5	"Not Criminally Responsible: Wedding Secrets"	John Kastner	November 24, 2016
A sequel to Kastner's 2013 television documentary NCR: Not Criminally Responsible, the film updates the story of Sean Clifton as he attempts to make amends to Julie Bouvier, the woman he was convicted of stabbing in 1999, prior to the wedding of his son Jon McMahon to an associate producer of the earlier film, to which both Clifton and Bouvier have been invited.
6	"Unstoppable: The Fentanyl Epidemic"	Robert Osborne	December 1, 2016
An examination of the epidemic of fentanyl use in Canada.
7	"Once an Immigrant"	Michael McNamara	January 12, 2017
Actors Peter Keleghan, Ted Dykstra, Elvira Kurt, Maria Vacratsis, Grace Lynn Kung and Raoul Bhaneja, all first-generation Canadians of a variety of ethnic backgrounds, explore their parents' histories as immigrants to Canada.
8	"Colonization Road"	Michelle St. John	January 26, 2017
Comedian Ryan McMahon explores the impact of Ontario's historical colonization road system on First Nations.
9	"Lost on Arrival: Me, the Mounties and PTSD"	Helen Slinger	February 9, 2017
CBC journalist Curt Petrovich recounts his experience recovering from post-traumatic stress disorder while simultaneously investigating the killing of Robert Dziekański.
10	"Kosher Love"	Evan Beloff	February 16, 2017
Profile of Yisroel Bernath, a rabbi in Montreal who is also a popular matchmaker for Jewish people seeking romantic relationships.
11	"Free Reins"	Jackie Torrens	February 23, 2017
A profile of Hinchinbrook, a horse farm in Nova Scotia which specializes in horse therapy for people with physical and mental disabilities.
12	"The Missing Tourist"	Geoff Morrison	March 2, 2017
An investigation of the case of Atsumi Yoshikubo, a Japanese tourist who went missing in Yellowknife, Northwest Territories in 2014.
13	"The Skin We're In"	Charles Officer	March 9, 2017
Writer Desmond Cole examines the history of anti-Black Canadian racism in Canada.

=== CBC Docs POV, Season 1 ===
No.	Title	Directed by	Original release date
1	"Bee Nation"	Lana Slezic	2017
2	"Mohamed Fahmy: Half Free"	David Paperny	2017
3	"Return to Park Ex"	Tony Asimakopoulos	2017
4	"Sickboy"	Andrew MacCormack	2017
5	"Indictment: The Crimes of Shelly Chartier"	Lisa Jackson, Shane Belcourt	2017
An investigation of the "catfishing" crimes of Shelly Chartier.
6	"Inseparable: 10 Years Joined at the Head"	Judith Pyke	2017
7	"Birth of a Family"	Tasha Hubbard	2017
Four indigenous siblings who were separated from their parents as part of the Sixties Scoop, and placed for adoption, are reunited for the first time as adults.
8	"Skinhead"	Andrew Gregg	2017
9	"Angry Inuk"	Alethea Arnaquq-Baril	2017
10	"The Caregivers' Club"	Cynthia Banks	2017
11	"The Way Out"	Michelle Shephard, David York	2017
12	"Searching for Winnetou"	Drew Hayden Taylor	2017
13	"Sweet Dreams for Chiyo"	Kaz Ehara, Rhiana Ehara	2018
The filmmakers document their own experience as parents of a daughter with Type 1 diabetes.
14	"Love, Hope & Autism"	Helen Slinger	2018
15	"Catwalk: Tales from the Cat Show Circuit"	Aaron Hancox, Michael McNamara	April 1, 2018
A look at the culture of cat shows.
16	"After the Sirens"	Kevin Eastwood	April 8, 2018

=== CBC Docs POV, Season 2 ===
No.	Title	Directed by	Original release date
1	"14 & Muslim"	Wendy Rowland	2018
2	"Prison Pump"	Gary Lang	2018
3	"The Reckoning: Hollywood's Worst Kept Secret"	Barry Avrich	2018
An exploration of the issue of sexual harassment in Hollywood.
4	"Band Geeks"	Morgan Elliott	2018
5	"The Third Dive: The Death of Rob Stewart"	Robert Osborne	October 26, 2018
An exploration of the scuba diving death of Canadian documentary filmmaker Rob Stewart during production of Sharkwater Extinction.
6	"Shut Him Down: The Rise of Jordan Peterson"	Patricia Marcoccia	2018
7	"Next of Kin"	Nadine Pequeneza	2018
8	"Know I'm Here"	Elbert Bakker	2018
9	"I Think You've Been Looking for Me"	Kacim Steets	2018
10	"Pugly: A Pug's Life"	Michael McNamara	2018
11	"To the Worlds"	Wendy Ord	January 18, 2019
Profile of a group of older women from Kelowna, British Columbia, who came together as a figure skating team with the goal of participating in the International Skating Union's 2018 adult figure skating competition in Oberstdorf, Germany.
12	"Spaceman"	John Choi, Nicolina Lanni	2019
13	"Mr. Jane and Finch"	Ngardy Conteh George	February 22, 2019
Portrait of Winston LaRose, a longtime community activist in Toronto's Jane and Finch neighbourhood who is campaigning for a Toronto City Council seat in the 2018 Toronto municipal election.
14	"Year of the Gun"	Marc de Guerre	2019
15	"My Farmland"	Xiaoping Diana Dai	2019
16	"Village of the Missing"	Michael Del Monte	March 22, 2019
An examination of the 2010–2017 Toronto serial homicides by Bruce McArthur in Toronto's Church and Wellesley gay village.
17	"Modified"	Aube Giroux	2019

=== CBC Docs POV, Season 3 ===
No.	Title	Directed by	Original release date
1	"Drag Kids"	Megan Wennberg	July 25, 2019
Profile of four young drag performers.
2	"Town of Widows"	Natasha Luckhardt, Rob Viscardis	August 8, 2019
Centres on the families of former workers General Electric's operations in Peterborough, Ontario, who are seeking reparations for their loved ones' often premature deaths of cancer believed to have been caused by chemical contamination in the workplace.
3	"Humboldt: The New Season"	Kevin Eastwood	August 15, 2019
Profile of the Humboldt Broncos junior hockey team as they prepare to return to the ice for the first time since the Humboldt Broncos bus crash of 2018.
4	"Never Too Old"	Marcia Connolly	August 22, 2019
Profile of Olive Bryanton, an 82-year-old woman who is pursuing her Ph.D. at the University of Prince Edward Island, with her doctoral thesis focusing on the physical and mental health needs of other women in her age bracket.
5	"The Mill"	David Craig	August 29, 2019
History of environmental controversies associated with the Northern Pulp Mill in Pictou County, Nova Scotia.
6	"Disruptor Conductor"	Sharon Lewis	September 5, 2019
Profile of Daniel Bartholomew-Poyser, a gay Black Canadian orchestral conductor who works to make classical music accessible to non-traditional audiences.
7	"Saving Rabbit"	Manfred Becker, Karen Wookey	September 12, 2019
Profile of Peter "Rabbit" Saunders, a fentanyl addict struggling to recover from his dependence.
8	"Hockey Mom"	Andrew Moir, Teyama Alkamli	2019
A single mother who came to Canada as a refugee from the Syrian Civil War enrols her son in ice hockey in an attempt to adapt to their new lives in Canada.
9	"We Will Stand Up"	Tasha Hubbard	2019
Television edit of Hubbard's theatrical documentary film Nîpawistamâsowin: We Will Stand Up, about the death of Colten Boushie.
10	"Margaret Atwood: Encounters"	Nancy Lang, Peter Raymont	November 14, 2019
A profile of writer Margaret Atwood. Shorter version of their feature documentary Margaret Atwood: A Word After A Word After A Word Is Power.
11	"The Internet of Everything"	Brett Gaylor	2019
12	"The Art of Downsizing"	Geeta Sondhi	2019

=== CBC Docs POV, Season 4 ===
No.	Title	Directed by	Original release date
1	"Cottagers and Indians"	Drew Hayden Taylor	July 4, 2020
Profile of James Whetung, an indigenous activist who plants wild rice at Pigeon Lake, and his conflicts with local homeowners opposed to the project.
2	"Above the Law"	Marc Serpa Francoeur, Robinder Uppal	July 11, 2020
An examination of allegations of abuse of power against the Calgary Police. Shorter edition of the filmmakers' feature film No Visible Trauma, which premiered in full at the 2020 Vancouver International Film Festival later in the year.
3	"#Blessed"	Ali Weinstein	July 18, 2020
Profile of Sam Picken, the pastor of a C3 Church Global congregation in Toronto.
4	"The World's Biggest Family"	Barry Stevens	October 1, 2020
After discovering that he is the biological son of Norman Barwin, an Ottawa fertility doctor who secretly used his own semen to impregnate women, the filmmaker tries to track down some of his 600+ biological half-siblings while examining the ethics of the larger practice of anonymous sperm donation.
5	"Rare Bird Alert"	Michael Melski	October 3, 2020
Profile of people engaged in the hobby of birdwatching.
6	"There's No Place Like This Place, Anyplace"	Lulu Wei	October 8, 2020
Examination of urban gentrification, through the closure, demolition and redevelopment of the historic Honest Ed's department store in Toronto.
7	"Company Town"	Peter Findlay	October 10, 2020
An examination of the effects on the city of Oshawa, Ontario of General Motors' announcement that it would close the Oshawa Car Assembly plant.
8	"Her Last Project"	Rosvita Dransfeld	October 15, 2020
Profile of Shelly Sarwal, a physician in Nova Scotia who is working to prepare the donation of her organs following her medically assisted death.
9	"The Killing of Phillip Boudreau"	Megan Wennberg	October 17, 2020
An examination of the 2013 death of Phillip Boudreau, a smalltime criminal in Isle Madame, Nova Scotia who was murdered by vigilantes.
10	"Year of the Goat"	Michael McNamara, Aaron Hancox	October 24, 2020
Profile of goat farmers in Southwestern Ontario who compete in goat-raising competitions at agricultural fairs.
11	"UFO Town"	Unknown	March 26, 2021

=== CBC Docs POV, Season 5 ===
No.	Title	Directed by	Original release date
1	"Prison Farm"	Tess Girard	September 18, 2021
Explores the revival of the prison farm as a concept in the rehabilitation of prison inmates, through the story of several prisoners at the Collins Bay Institution.
2	"Born Bad"	Marc de Guerre	September 25, 2021
