= Beverly Anne Giesbrecht =

Canadian Islam media consultant

- Born: August 26, 1953
- Died: 2010 (aged 56–57); Pakistan
- Other names: Khadija Abdul Qahaar; Beverly Kennedy; Paul Morris-Read
- Occupations: media consultant, publisher, website designer
- Known for: A convert to Islam, who traveled to a war zone to support muslim women, where she died in captivity after being kidnapped by jihadists

Beverly Anne Giesbrecht (August 26, 1953 – 2010) was a western convert to Islam who created the controversial website Jihad Unspun. Giesbrecht was a media consultant and website designer, prior to her conversion and her creation of Jihad Unspun. She is reported to have become interested in Islam following al Qaeda's attacks on September 11, 2001.

In 2008. she moved to the Afghanistan region, where she continued to operate Jihad Unspun. In spite of being generally sympathetic to the Taliban, she was captured and held for ransom. She sent pleading letters and videos to Canada, warning that her captors would kill her if their ransom demands weren't met. She died of hepatitis after years of captivity.

Giesbrecht was kidnapped in October 2008. On November 3, 2008, CBC News reported that her most recent online video contained an appeal for donations to leave the region; as the war had become more active, and she felt it was no longer safe for her to stay there.

Her friend, Glen Cooper, was the primary contact when she was in captivity. The Globe and Mail reported in March 2011 that after months of no contact, following months of declining health, he accepted that she had died in captivity.

In 2012, two years after her death, CBC News quoted RCMP Commissioner Bob Paulson's first comments on the case. Curt Petrovich, the journalist who questioned Paulson, recorded him stating "there was some ambiguity as to whether the kidnap was a legitimate kidnap or not".

In 2016, an episode of CBC News's series Firsthand recounted her story. Although some sources speculated that she was not a sincere convert to Islam, and that her website was a false flag operation, the CBC's interviews with her friends in Canada portrayed her as sincere and motivated by humanitarian motives.
