= Kevin Eastwood =

Director and filmmaker

- Born: Vancouver, British Columbia, Canada
- Education: Emily Carr University of Art and Design
- Occupations: Documentary filmmaker, film and television producer
- Years active: 2001–present
- Spouse: Wynn Deschner (2016-present)

Kevin Eastwood is a Canadian documentary filmmaker and film and television producer. He is best known for directing three series for Knowledge Network: Wildfire (2025), British Columbia: An Untold History (2021) and Emergency Room: Life + Death at VGH (2014-2017). He also directed the CBC Television documentaries Humboldt: The New Season (2019) and After the Sirens (2018). His credits as a producer include the movies Fido, Preggoland and The Delicate Art of Parking, the television series The Romeo Section, and the documentaries The Painted Life of E.J. Hughes, Haida Modern, Haida Gwaii: On the Edge of the World and Eco-Pirate: The Story of Paul Watson.

== Career ==
Eastwood started his film career in 2000 at the feature film production company, Anagram Pictures. While at Anagram, he was associate producer on Andrew Currie's first feature, Mile Zero, and co-produced the comedies The Delicate Art of Parking and Fido and was the supervising producer on the CTV movie Elijah, about the life of Canadian Oji-Cree politician, Elijah Harper. He left Anagram in 2008 to be an independent producer and produced his first documentary, Eco-Pirate: The Story of Paul Watson directed by Trish Dolman which was released in theatres across Canada by Entertainment One. This started him on a course of alternating producing documentaries like Do You Really Want to Know? directed by Oscar-winning filmmaker John Zaritsky, and Haida Gwaii: On the Edge of the World directed by Charles Wilkinson, with dramatic projects like Preggoland directed by Jacob Tierney, and The Romeo Section from TV creator and showrunner Chris Haddock.

In 2013, Eastwood directed Emergency Room: Life + Death at VGH, an award-winning documentary series about the public healthcare system. Emergency Room: Life + Death at VGH brought record-breaking audiences to the Knowledge Network and won Leo Awards for Best Documentary Series and The People's Choice Award for Favourite TV series.

After Emergency Room, Eastwood directed multiple award-winning broadcast documentaries. These include The Death Debate, for Telus Optik TV, about the landmark Carter v Canada Supreme Court case on physician-assisted dying (Canadian Screen Award nominee for Best Direction); After the Sirens, a documentary for CBC Television about the epidemic of PTSD among paramedics (nominated in 2019 for Best Documentary Program by the Academy of Canadian Cinema and Television); and Humboldt: The New Season, also for CBC, about the survivors of the Humboldt Broncos bus crash in which 16 people died (nominated in 2020 for Best Documentary Program by the Academy of Canadian Cinema and Television).

In 2021, Eastwood was the series director and writer of British Columbia: An Untold History, a critically acclaimed history series for Knowledge Network that retold the history of the Canadian province of British Columbia from a more diverse and inclusive perspective. The series was nominated for five Canadian Screen Awards, and won five Leo Awards including Best Documentary Series, as well as Best Direction and Best Screenwriting awards for Eastwood.

In 2024, Eastwood wrote, directed and produced The Society Page, a short documentary about longtime Vancouver Sun newspaper columnist and former Vancouver Magazine editor, Malcolm Parry. The film was nominated for four Leo Awards including Best Short Documentary and won the award for Best Direction in a Short Documentary.

Most recently, Eastwood was the co-creator, showrunner and co-director of Wildfire, a five-part documentary series about people who work on the frontlines of wildfire suppression during a period of unprecedented climate change. The series was filmed across British Columbia during the summer of 2023, Canada's worst wildfire season on record, and premiered on Knowledge Network in April 2025.

Eastwood also directed the music video for Post-War Blues by Dan Mangan (an homage to Dr. Strangelove starring Don McKellar); and the Gemini Award-nominated short documentary Douglas Coupland: Pop Artist, as well as multiple documentary projects for the BC Civil Liberties Association, Canada's longest-running civil liberties association.

== Personal life ==
Eastwood was born and raised in Vancouver, Canada. His mother was a painter and his father a commercial artist. He started working in movie theatres and bought his first video camera when he was 15. He studied film at Emily Carr University of Art + Design, making him the third generation in his family to go to art school. He married his wife, Wynn Deschner, in 2016.

== Filmography ==
=== Feature films ===
- Mile Zero (2001) - Associate Producer
- The Delicate Art of Parking (2003) - Producer
- Fido (2006) - Producer
- Crimes of Mike Recket (2012) - Executive Producer
- Preggoland (2014) - Producer

=== Documentary ===
- 12 Takes (2010) - Director (segment: Douglas Coupland: Pop Artist)
- Eco-Pirate: The Story of Paul Watson (2011) - Producer
- Do You Really Want to Know? (2012) - Producer
- Oil Sands Karaoke (2013) - Executive Producer
- Haida Gwaii: On the Edge of the World (2015) - Executive Producer
- The Death Debate (2016) - Director/Producer/Writer
- Vancouver: No Fixed Address (2017) - Executive Producer
- After the Sirens (2018) - Director/Producer/Writer
- Humboldt: The New Season (2019) - Director/Writer
- Haida Modern (2019) - Executive Producer
- Part of the Pack (2022) - Producer
- Wildfire – Director

=== Television ===
- This Space for Rent (2007) - Co-Producer
- Elijah (2007) - Supervising Producer
- Confessions: Animal Hoarding (2011-2012) - Director
- Emergency Room: Life + Death at VGH (2014-2016) - Director/Co-Executive Producer
- The Romeo Section (2015-2016) - Co-Producer/Second Unit Director
- British Columbia: An Untold History (2021) - Series Director
- The Society Page (2024) - Director/Producer/Writer

== Awards ==
Eastwood has won a Gemini Award from the Academy of Canadian Cinema and Television (Best TV Movie for Elijah), seven Leo Awards (for The Society Page, British Columbia: An Untold History, Haida Modern, Emergency Room and Elijah), the Allan King Award from the Directors Guild of Canada (for Haida Gwaii: On the Edge of the World), five Golden Sheaf Awards (including the 2020 Ruth Shaw Award for Humboldt: The New Season), and the top prize at the Hot Docs Documentary Film Festival (for Haida Gwaii: On the Edge of the World).

He has also been nominated for six Canadian Screen Awards by the Academy of Canadian Cinema and Television (for British Columbia: An Untold History, Humboldt: The New Season, After the Sirens, The Death Debate and Emergency Room), a further eleven Golden Sheaf Awards by the Yorkton Film Festival and an additional fourteen Leo Awards.
