= Wildfire (2025 TV series) =

Canadian documentary TV series

- Genre: Documentary series
- Created by: Kevin Eastwood; Clayton Mitchel; Simon Shave
- Showrunner: Kevin Eastwood
- Directed by: Kevin Eastwood; Clayton Mitchel; Simon Shave
- Music by: Andrew Harris
- Country of origin: Canada
- Original language: English
- No. of episodes: 5

Production
- Executive producer: Kevin Eastwood
- Producers: Simon Shave; Clayton Mitchell
- Cinematography: Clayton Mitchell; Simon Shave
- Editors: Eddie O. Tanya Maryniak
- Running time: 5 x 50 minutes
- Production companies: CK9 Studios; Optic Nerve Films

Original release
- Network: Knowledge Network
- Release: 29 April – 27 May 2025

Wildfire is a five-part Canadian documentary series, created by Kevin Eastwood, Clayton Mitchell and Simon Shave, that aired on Knowledge Network from April 29 to May 27, 2025. The television series follows people who work on the frontlines of wildfire suppression, while also examining how climate change has exacerbated unsustainable forestry management practices to create a major fuel build-up that is the cause of some of today's modern mega fires.

== Overview ==
Filmed across the Canadian province of British Columbia during the summer of 2023, Canada's worst wildfire season on record, the series follows specialized wildfire unit crews including initial attack, air attack, parattack (alternatively known as smokejumpers), rapattack, and other personnel working in different roles within the BC Wildfire Service, as well as the last remaining all-Indigenous unit crew in the province.

In addition to the various crews working to protect communities from wildfires, the series also looks at some of the residents who have been impacted by wildfires (in some cases losing their homes) and/or who are trying to rebuild their lives in the aftermath. This includes showing scenes from several high-profile fires that that received national and international coverage during the 2023 fire season, such as the McDougall Creek wildfire in West Kelowna, the Horsethief Creek Fire near Invermere, the Gun Lake Fire, and the largest wildfire ever recorded in the province's history, the Donnie Creek fire.

== Release ==
The series had its broadcast premiere on Tuesday, April 29, 2025 on Knowledge Network, with new episodes airing each subsequent Tuesday through to May 27, 2025. Each week's episodes were also added to Knowledge Network's streaming platform, knowledge.ca.

== Reception ==
Upon its release, Wildfire was well received by journalists. Dorothy Woodend of The Tyee called Wildfire "a remarkable undertaking" and "extraordinary achievement, not only in the stories captured and the technologies employed, but more importantly in pulling together the bigger picture. As climate change looms large, the work of fighting the fires is part of a war for the planet."

Other critics highlighted the series' unique and unprecedented access. POV Magazine critic, Pat Mullen, said that the series "makes these human stories so compelling by giving seemingly unprecedented access to the line of fire: one can almost feel the heat of the flames with the immediacy of the footage." In writing for Montecristo Magazine, Paloma Pacheco wrote that the series "gets us closer to B.C.'s fires than perhaps any other documentary has".

== Awards ==
In March 2026, Wildfire was nominated for a Rockie Award for Best Docuseries at the Banff World Media Festival and at the 2026 Yorkton Film Festival the series won the Golden Sheaf Award for Best Factual Documentary Series. On May 26, 2026 it was announced that Wildfire was nominated for three Leo Awards: Best Direction in a Documentary Series for Kevin Eastwood and Clayton Mitchell, Best Cinematography for Mitchell and Simon Shave, and Best Musical Score for Andrew Harris.
