= Humboldt: The New Season =

CBC Documentary

- Genre: Documentary
- Directed by: Kevin Eastwood; Lucas Frison
- Music by: Anita Lubosch
- Country of origin: Canada
- Original language: English

Production
- Producers: Chris McIvor; Lucas Frison; Libby Lea; Élise Beadry-Ferland
- Cinematography: Brad Crawford
- Editor: Joni Church
- Running time: 44 minutes
- Production companies: FRANK Digital; Prairie Cat Productions

Original release
- Network: CBC Television
- Release: August 15, 2019

Humbolt: The New Season is a Canadian documentary television program about the aftermath of the 2018 bus crash that killed 16 members of Saskatchewan's Humboldt Broncos junior hockey team and injured 13 more. It was directed by Kevin Eastwood and Lucas Frison and commissioned by the Canadian Broadcasting Corporation for the CBC Docs POV television program.

== Summary ==
The film focuses on the healing processes undergone by the survivors and their families. It follows the surviving players as they train for the 2018-2019 hockey season with new coaches and teammates and pursue recovery from injuries and trauma.

== Production ==
The film was shot over the course of 11 months starting in August 2018. Co-director Lucas Frison was lifelong friends with Broncos' assistant coach Mark Cross, who perished in the crash, and Frison invited Eastwood to co-direct due to Eastwood's background in films about trauma and mental health. In a Canadian Press interview, Frison said making the film was part of his own healing process, and that his family connections to the area made it easier to develop relationships with the subjects of the film.

== Release ==
The documentary aired on CBC Television on August 15, 2019 as part of the CBC Docs POV lineup, and was made available for streaming via the CBC Gem platform.

== Reception ==
Pat Mullen of Point of View wrote "The doc is a poignant tribute to the players who make their community proud," while Victor Stiff of Thatshelf.com called the film "A powerful story of resilience and healing,". Greg David of TV-eh.com wrote: "The danger of making a project like this is that it can feel invasive, an excuse to get into the faces of those affected and exploit them. But the producers don’t ever do that. The result is a tear-filled story of remembrance and respect that everyone should watch."

== Awards ==
- 2020 Yorkton Film Festival Golden Sheaf Awards
  - Winner: Ruth Shaw Award (Best of Saskatchewan)
- 2020 Hollywood North Film Festival
  - Winner: Best Documentary
- 2020 Canadian Screen Awards
  - Nominee: Best Documentary Program
- 2019 Chilliwack Independent Film Festival
  - Winner: Best Documentary
