= After the Sirens =

2018 Canadian documentary

- Genre: Documentary
- Directed by: Kevin Eastwood
- Music by: Andrew Harris
- Country of origin: Canada
- Original language: English

Production
- Producers: Kevin Eastwood; Jason James
- Cinematography: Ian Kerr, csc
- Editor: Brendan Woollard
- Running time: 44 minutes
- Production company: Optic Nerve Films Inc.

Original release
- Network: CBC Television
- Release: April 8, 2018

After the Sirens is a 2018 Canadian documentary television program about the epidemic of post-traumatic stress disorder among paramedics. It consists of interviews with emergency medical workers and mental health experts as well as dramatic re-creations of emergency calls experienced by the interview subjects. It was directed by Kevin Eastwood and produced and commissioned by the Canadian Broadcasting Corporation for the Docs POV television program.

== Summary ==
The documentary recounts the stories of three paramedics who suffered traumatic incidents during the course of their careers and subsequently developed symptoms of post-traumatic stress disorder, including severe depression and substance abuse. Experts cite statistics and research showing paramedics to be at particular risk for PTSD and suicide and discuss the bureaucratic roadblocks faced by paramedics who attempt to seek treatment.

The documentary is structured to highlight similarities in the paramedics’ stories, from their initial idealism and hope about their careers, through the traumatic incidents that stood out from the normal pressures of their profession. Also highlighted are the periods of depression and self-medication with alcohol and/or drugs, suicidal ideation or suicide attempts and the paramedics struggles with recovery.

== Awards ==
The film was nominated for Best Documentary by the Academy of Canadian Cinema & Television at the 2019 Canadian Screen Awards, Best Documentary (Social/Political) at the Yorkton Golden Sheaf Awards, five Leo Awards (including Best Short Documentary and Best Direction, winning for Best Cinematography and Best Score) and won the Mindset Award for Workplace Mental Health Reporting at the 2019 CAJ Awards.

== Featured individuals ==
- Clive Derbyshire is a paramedic based in Vancouver, British Columbia, Canada. He works in Downtown Eastside, a Neighbourhood whose residents have a disproportionately high rate of homelessness, mental health problems, and addictions. He believes his PTSD derives from his experience responding to a motor vehicle accident incident in which a close friend died.
- Natalie Harris is a retired paramedic from Barrie, Ontario, who cites treating, and later encountering in court, multiple-murderer Mark Dobson as the source of her PTSD, which sparked addictions to alcohol and prescription drugs.
- Don Devine was among the first Canadians to train as a paramedic in the 1970s. He worked in the Vernon, British Columbia region and in 1996 responded to the scene of the massacre of the Ghakal family, after which he developed symptoms of PTSD.
- Cheryl Drewitz-Cheney is a former nurse and the author of the study “Posttraumatic Stress Disorder among Paramedics”. She has studied the high incidents of addiction, suicide, PTSD, and related conditions among first responders.
- Vince Savoia is a former emergency dispatcher and the founder and executive director of the Tema Conter Memorial Trust, an Ontario-based support group for sufferers of PTSD in the first-responder and military communities. He discusses the culture of the paramedic profession and the challenges faced by some first responders who seek treatment.

== Production ==
Director Kevin Eastwood initially met Derbyshire during the filming of Knowledge Network’s factual series Emergency Room: Life + Death at VGH. In an interview with a Vancouver Sun reporter, Eastwood said, "I didn’t know him well, but I knew him by face and we had been friendly in the emergency room. I had always seen him as being this charismatic, attractive, really good at his job, really confident, good paramedic. To learn what he was actually struggling with on the inside, well, I had no idea."

== Release ==
The documentary aired on CBC Television on April 8, 2018 but was pre-empted in some provinces by the broadcast of the Humboldt Broncos vigil. CBC aired the program in the rest of Canada on April 9.

== Impact ==
Three days after the initial broadcast, the NDP Government announced Bill 9 – 2018: Workers Compensation Amendment Act, which included changes to Worksafe regulations. Prior to this change, BC first-responders who developed PTSD were required to prove to Worksafe BC that their condition was related to their work to receive the benefits associated with work-related injuries. If the legislation is approved, the burden of proof would not fall upon the first-responders, making it easier for PTSD sufferers to access benefits and treatment options.

British Columbia MLA Andrew Weaver summarized the change: "This bill updates the Workers Compensation Act for eligible occupations (corrections officer, an emergency medical assistant, a firefighter, a police officer, a sheriff or other as prescribed by regulation) who are exposed to one or more traumatic events over the course of their employment and are subsequently diagnosed with a mental disorder. The disorder will be presumed to have been caused by the nature of their work rather than having to prove that it was work-related. British Columbia is one of the last such jurisdictions in Canada to have such legislation."
