= British Columbia: An Untold History =

- Genre: Documentary
- Directed by: Kevin Eastwood
- Narrated by: Shane Koyczan
- Music by: Cris Derksen
- Country of origin: Canada
- Original language: English
- No. of episodes: 4

Production
- Executive producer: Trish Dolman
- Producer: Leena Minifie
- Cinematography: Alfonso Chin, Michael Bourquin
- Editors: Eddie O., Tanya Maryniak
- Running time: 4 x 58 minutes
- Production company: Screen Siren Pictures

Original release
- Network: Knowledge Network
- Release: 21 October – 2 November 2021

British Columbia: An Untold History is a Canadian documentary series, which aired on Knowledge Network in 2021. Directed by Kevin Eastwood, the four-episode series highlights some of the lesser-known stories in the history of the Canadian province of British Columbia. The project portrays a diverse perspective of B.C.'s shared past, as told by those who have lived and/or studied it, and features the voices of authors, historians, elders, activists, community leaders, and descendants of historical figures, many of whom are members of Indigenous, Chinese, Japanese, South Asian, and Black communities.

== Synopsis ==
The four-part documentary examines British Columbia’s dramatic history from the late 18th century through to the present, as told through interviews with figures who have lived and studied it, and presented with archival photos, recreations and aerial footage of the B.C. landscape. Indigenous, Asian, Black and European stories are interwoven to present a diverse look at the sometimes lesser-known events that define B.C. as it is known today.

== Awards ==
British Columbia: An Untold History won five Leo Awards: Best Documentary Series (Trish Dolman and Leena Minifie), Best Direction in a Documentary Series (Kevin Eastwood), Best Screenwriting in a Documentary Series (Eastwood), Best Picture Editing (Eddie O. and Tanya Maryniak) and Best Sound in a Documentary Series (Velcrow Ripper, Ramsay Bourquin, Kaitlyn Redcrow, Brent Calkin and J. Martin Taylor). The series also received an award of merit from the BC Historical Federation for its "significant contribution to the study or promotion of British Columbia history".

The series received five Canadian Screen Award nominations from the Academy of Canadian Cinema and Television at the 10th Canadian Screen Awards in 2022: for Best History Documentary Program or Series, Best Direction in a Documentary Series (Eastwood), Best Photography in a Documentary Program or Factual Series (Alfonso Chin and Michael Bourquin), Best Editorial Research (Leena Minifie and Jennifer Chiu), and Best Visual Research (Lanna Lucas, Casey Lees, Ben Mussett, Leah Siegel, Don Bourdon and Emma Metcalfe Hurst).

== Cast ==
=== Interviews ===
- Stephanie Allen
- Joe Alphonse
- Clifford Atleo
- Jean Barman
- John Belshaw
- Tzeporah Berman
- Lara Campbell
- Donna Cranmer
- Bill Cranmer
- Severn Cullis-Suzuki
- Sara Florence Davidson
- John Elliot
- Corky Evans
- Mark Forsythe
- Daniel Francis
- Hamar Foster
- Masako Fukawa
- Don Gayton
- Naveen Girn
- Guujaaw
- Marianne Ignace
- Khelsilem
- Valerie Langer
- Mark Leier
- Corrina Leween
- Imogene Lim
- Kevin Loring
- Johnny Mack
- Daniel Marshall
- Joe Martin
- Albert (Sonny) McHalsie/Naxaxalhts’i
- Geoff Meggs
- Charles Menzies
- Rod Mickleburgh
- Fran Morrison
- Lou-Ann Neel
- Walrus Oakenbough
- Lorene Oikawa
- Adele Perry
- Jonathan Peyron
- Adam Rudder
- Lillian Sam
- Calvin Sandborn
- Sharanjit Sandhra Kaur
- Andrew Scott
- Bev Sellars
- Paul Spong
- Veronica Strong-Boag
- Coll Thrush
- Rex Weyler
- David Wong
- T’uy’t’tanat-Cease Wyss
- Henry Yu
