= Vancouver Film Critics Circle Award for Best Documentary =

Canadian film award

The Vancouver Film Critics Circle Award for Best Documentary Film is an annual award, presented by the Vancouver Film Critics Circle to the film judged by its members as the best international documentary film of the year. It is separate from the Vancouver Film Critics Circle Award for Best Canadian Documentary, presented to Canadian documentary films.

== Winners and nominees ==
=== 2000s ===
Year	Films	Directors	Ref
2009	Anvil! The Story of Anvil	Sacha Gervasi	
2009	The Cove	Louie Psihoyos	
2009	Food, Inc.	Robert Kenner	

=== 2010s ===
Year	Films	Directors	Ref
2010	Exit Through the Gift Shop	Banksy	
2010	Inside Job	Charles Ferguson	
2010	Waiting for "Superman"	Davis Guggenheim	
2011	Cave of Forgotten Dreams	Werner Herzog	
2011	The Interrupters	Steve James	
2011	Nostalgia for the Light	Patricio Guzmán	
2011	Project Nim	James Marsh	
2011	Surviving Progress	Mathieu Roy, Harold Crooks	
2012	Searching for Sugar Man	Malik Bendjelloul	
2012	Ai Weiwei: Never Sorry	Alison Klayman	
2012	How to Survive a Plague	David France	
2013	The Act of Killing	Joshua Oppenheimer	
2013	Blackfish	Gabriela Cowperthwaite	
2013	West of Memphis	Amy J. Berg	
2014	The Overnighters	Jesse Moss	
2014	Citizenfour	Laura Poitras	
2014	Virunga	Orlando von Einsiedel	
2015	Amy	Asif Kapadia	
2015	Cartel Land	Matthew Heineman	
2015	Going Clear	Alex Gibney	
2016	Cameraperson	Kirsten Johnson	
2016	13th	Ava DuVernay	
2016	O.J.: Made in America	Ezra Edelman	
2017	Ex Libris: The New York Public Library	Frederick Wiseman	
2017	Faces Places (Visages Villages)	Agnès Varda, JR	
2017	Jane	Brett Morgen	
2018	Minding the Gap	Bing Liu	
2018	Free Solo	Elizabeth Chai Vasarhelyi, Jimmy Chin	
2018	Won't You Be My Neighbor?	Morgan Neville	
2019	Honeyland	Tamara Kotevska, Ljubomir Stefanov	
2019	Apollo 11	Todd Douglas Miller	
2019	For Sama	Waad Al-Khateab, Edward Watts	

=== 2020s ===
Year	Films	Directors	Ref
2020	Collective	Alexander Nanau	
2020	Athlete A	Bonni Cohen, Jon Shenk	
2020	Totally Under Control	Alex Gibney	
2021	Flee	Jonas Poher Rasmussen	
2021	The Sparks Brothers	Edgar Wright	
2021	Summer of Soul	Questlove	
2022	All the Beauty and the Bloodshed	Laura Poitras	
2022	Fire of Love	Sara Dosa	
2022	Moonage Daydream	Brett Morgen	
2023	To Kill a Tiger	Nisha Pahuja	
2023	American Symphony	Matthew Heineman	
2023	Still: A Michael J. Fox Movie	Davis Guggenheim	
2024	No Other Land	Basel Adra, Hamdan Ballal, Yuval Abraham, Rachel Szor	
2024	Super/Man: The Christopher Reeve Story	Ian Bonhôte, Peter Ettedgui	
2024	Will & Harper	Josh Greenbaum	
