= To Kill a Tiger =

2022 documentary film by Nisha Pahuja

- Directed by: Nisha Pahuja
- Written by: Nisha Pahuja
- Produced by: David Oppenheim; Nisha Pahuja; Cornelia Principe
- Cinematography: Mrinal Desai
- Edited by: Dave Kazala; Mike Munn
- Music by: Jonathan Goldsmith
- Production companies: Notice Pictures; National Film Board of Canada
- Distributed by: Netflix (Note: This documentary was originally given a limited theatrical release in the United States on October 20, 2023 without a distributor, followed by a re-release on February 9, 2024 following its nomination for the Academy Award for Best Documentary Feature Film. After Netflix's acquisition of distribution rights to the documentary, it was released on the platform as a Netflix Original.)
- Release date: September 10, 2022 (TIFF)
- Running time: 127 minutes
- Country: Canada
- Language: Hindi

To Kill a Tiger is a 2022 Hindi-language Canadian documentary film, directed by Nisha Pahuja. The film centres on a family in Jharkhand, India, who are campaigning for justice after their teenage daughter was brutally raped.

The film premiered at the Toronto International Film Festival on September 10, 2022. The film had its American premiere at the Lighthouse International Film Festival in June 2023. It was nominated for Best Documentary Feature at the 96th Academy Awards.

== Release ==
To Kill a Tiger was originally released in select theaters in the United States without a distributor on October 20, 2023, followed by a re-release on February 9, 2024. In August 2023, Creators Faire reported that Dev Patel and Mindy Kaling signed on as executive producers; other executive producers also include Deepa Mehta, Rupi Kaur and Atul Gawande. In February 2024, Netflix acquired worldwide distribution rights to the documentary, planning to release the documentary on their platform as soon as possible, with Priyanka Chopra Jonas joining the film as an executive producer. On March 8, 2024, Pahuja announced that the film would be made available globally on Netflix two days later, coinciding with the 96th Academy Awards.

== Critical response ==
The film was named to TIFF's annual year-end Canada's Top Ten list for 2022.

While western publications heavily praised the documentary, Indian journalist and film critic Anna M.M. Vetticad, writing for Himal Southasian, offered a critical counter-perspective. Vetticad argued that international coverage overlooked a significant legal and ethical oversight in the film's production. She criticized the framing of Western media—such as The New York Times characterizing India's strict survivor privacy laws as a "shroud of shame"—stating that these legal protections are instead a vital "shield" meant to protect sexual violence survivors from systemic societal stigmatization and media exploitation in a deeply patriarchal society.

Janet Smith of Stir praised the film, writing that Pahuja "offers the viewer remarkable access to village life, not just in the modest home where Ranjit’s family make roti on an open fire, but in the fields where they herd goats and collect water from a pump. The camera finds quiet details, like Ranjit’s daughter carefully weaving ribbons into her hair. Women and men insist that the community, not the criminal court, should solve the issue with a forced marriage—to remove the “stain on her”. The men become increasingly hostile—to the family, and eventually to the film crew itself."

Andrew Parker of TheGATE.ca wrote that "as a highly detailed and personal work that can point people in a direction where they could learn more about the subject and make a larger impact, To Kill a Tiger has an undeniable and unshakable power. It is one of those documentaries where anyone who watches it won’t be the same person by the end as they were when it started."

James Mackin of CityNews rated the film four stars, writing that "To Kill A Tiger is about accomplishing an insurmountable problem. The odds are stacked against them, the nation’s culture opposes their desire for justice. But Ranjit and his family persevere, and are able to remain in the village. This documentary is an incredibly emotional showcase that is absolutely worth a watch."

Thom Ernst of Northern Stars wrote that "told with immense compassion and bravery, To Kill a Tiger is Pahuja’s best film and one of the best documentaries at this year’s festival." The film has also garnered the attention of comedian and producer Mindy Kaling, who called the film a "triumph" and that "everyone should see it!"

== Legal issues and controversy ==
Following the film's international prominence and Academy Award nomination, legal and ethical questions were raised regarding its compliance with Indian child protection statutes. In an investigative review for Himal Southasian, critic Anna M.M. Vetticad noted that the documentary largely escaped scrutiny for potential violations of the country's child-protection laws during its production.

The film features footage of the rape survivor captured while she was still a minor, revealing her face and identifying details. Under Section 23 of The Protection of Children from Sexual Offences (POCSO) Act, 2012, there is an absolute prohibition against disclosing any information that could reveal the identity of a minor child rape survivor, unless explicit permission is granted by a competent Special Court in the interest of the child. Speaking to the publication, Supreme Court of India Senior Advocate Rebecca Mammen John questioned whether the filmmaker had obtained the legally required Special Court authorization prior to filming. John further noted that any later waivers of privacy signed by the survivor as an adult would not retroactively legitimize or validate filming that took place while she was legally a minor if proper judicial processes were bypassed at the time.

== Awards ==
Award	Date of ceremony	Category	Recipient(s)	Result	Ref(s)
Toronto International Film Festival	2022	Best Canadian Film	To Kill a Tiger	Won	
Cinéfest Sudbury International Film Festival	2022	Inspiring Voices and Perspectives	To Kill a Tiger	Won	
Canadian Screen Awards	2023	Best Feature Length Documentary	Nisha Pahuja, Cornelia Principe, David Oppenheim, Anita Lee, Atul Gawande	Won	
Canadian Screen Awards	2023	Best Editing in a Documentary	Mike Munn and Dave Kazala	Won	
Canadian Screen Awards	2023	Best Original Music in a Documentary	Jonathan Goldsmith	Won	
Palm Springs International Film Festival	2023	Best Documentary	To Kill a Tiger	Won	
Salem Film Fest	2023	Special Jury Award	To Kill a Tiger	Won	
Salem Film Fest	2023	Michael Sullivan Award for Documentary Journalism	To Kill a Tiger	Won	
Canadian Cinema Editors Awards	2023	Best Editing in Feature Documentary	Mike Munn and Dave Kazala	Won	
Lighthouse International Film Festival	2023	Audience Award for Best Documentary	To Kill a Tiger	Won	
Lighthouse International Film Festival	2023	Honey Levine Audience Choice Award	To Kill a Tiger	Won	
Doc Aviv- Tel Aviv International Documentary Film Festival	2023	Beyond the Screen Award	To Kill a Tiger	Won	
Mammoth Lakes Film Festival	2023	Best International Documentary Feature	To Kill a Tiger	Won	
New York Indian Film Festival	2023	Best Documentary	To Kill a Tiger	Won	
Directors Guild of Canada	2023	Allan King Award for Best Documentary	To Kill a Tiger	Won	
IDA Documentary Awards	2023	Best Original Music Score	Jonathan Goldsmith	Nominated	
IDA Documentary Awards	2023	Best Writing	Nisha Pahuja	Nominated	
Vancouver Film Critics Circle	2024	Best Documentary	Nisha Pahuja	Won	
Vancouver Film Critics Circle	2024	Best Canadian Film	Nisha Pahuja	Nominated	
Vancouver Film Critics Circle	2024	Best Director of a Canadian Film	Nisha Pahuja	Nominated	
Vancouver Film Critics Circle	2024	Best Canadian Documentary	Nisha Pahuja	Nominated	
Academy Awards	March 10, 2024	Best Documentary Feature Film	Nisha Pahuja, Cornelia Principe and David Oppenheim	Nominated	
