= Dave Kazala =

David Kazala CCE is a Canadian film and television editor, who won the Canadian Screen Award for Best Editing in a Documentary at the 11th Canadian Screen Awards in 2023 for his work on the film To Kill a Tiger.

He was previously nominated in the same category at the 7th Canadian Screen Awards in 2019 for Dolphin Man, and was a four-time Gemini Award and Canadian Screen Award nominee for Best Picture Editing in a Documentary Program or Series, receiving nods at the 22nd Gemini Awards in 2007 for Worlds Collide: The Saga of Herschel Island, at the 26th Gemini Awards in 2011 for Dish: Women, Waitressing & The Art of Service and The Real M*A*S*H, and at the 2nd Canadian Screen Awards in 2014 for The Real Inglorious Bastards.

His other credits have included the films The World Before Her (2012), Derby Crazy Love (2013), Driving with Selvi (2015), Migrant Dreams (2016) and The Heat: A Kitchen (R)evolution (2018).
