= Vancouver Film Critics Circle Awards 2013 =

Annual Canadian film awards ceremony

The winners of the 14th Vancouver Film Critics Circle Awards, honoring the best in filmmaking in 2013, were announced on January 8, 2014.

== Winners and nominees ==
=== International ===
| Category | Winners and nominees | Films |
|---|---|---|
| Best Film | Steve McQueen | 12 Years a Slave |
| Best Film | Alfonso Cuarón | Gravity |
| Best Film | Joel Coen and Ethan Coen | Inside Llewyn Davis |
| Best Actor | Oscar Isaac | Inside Llewyn Davis |
| Best Actor | Chiwetel Ejiofor | 12 Years a Slave |
| Best Actor | Matthew McConaughey | Dallas Buyers Club |
| Best Actress | Cate Blanchett | Blue Jasmine |
| Best Actress | Sandra Bullock | Gravity |
| Best Actress | Greta Gerwig | Frances Ha |
| Best Supporting Actor | Jared Leto | Dallas Buyers Club |
| Best Supporting Actor | Bradley Cooper | American Hustle |
| Best Supporting Actor | Michael Fassbender | 12 Years a Slave |
| Best Supporting Actress | Jennifer Lawrence | American Hustle |
| Best Supporting Actress | Lupita Nyong'o | 12 Years a Slave |
| Best Supporting Actress | June Squibb | Nebraska |
| Best Director | Alfonso Cuaron | Gravity |
| Best Director | Joel Coen and Ethan Coen | Inside Llewyn Davis |
| Best Director | Steve McQueen | 12 Years a Slave |
| Best Screenplay | Joel Coen and Ethan Coen | Inside Llewyn Davis |
| Best Screenplay | Spike Jonze | Her |
| Best Screenplay | John Ridley | 12 Years a Slave |
| Best Documentary | Joshua Oppenheimer | The Act of Killing |
| Best Documentary | Amy J. Berg | West of Memphis |
| Best Documentary | Gabriela Cowperthwaite | Blackfish |
| Best Foreign Language Film | Thomas Vinterberg | The Hunt |
| Best Foreign Language Film | Pablo Berger | Blancanieves |
| Best Foreign Language Film | Abdellatif Kechiche | Blue Is the Warmest Colour (La Vie d'Adèle – Chapitres 1 & 2) |

=== Canadian ===
| Category | Winners and nominees | Films |
|---|---|---|
| Best Film | Matt Johnson | The Dirties |
| Best Film | Louise Archambault | Gabrielle |
| Best Film | Jennifer Baichwal, Edward Burtynsky | Watermark |
| Best Actor | Matt Johnson | The Dirties |
| Best Actor | Thomas Haden Church | Whitewash |
| Best Actor | Tom Scholte | The Dick Knost Show |
| Best Actress | Sophie Desmarais | Sarah Prefers to Run (Sarah prefère la course) |
| Best Actress | Michelle Giroux | Blood Pressure |
| Best Actress | Tatiana Maslany | Picture Day |
| Best Supporting Actor | Alexandre Landry | Gabrielle |
| Best Supporting Actor | Marc Labrèche | Whitewash |
| Best Supporting Actor | Owen Williams | The Dirties |
| Best Supporting Actress | Lise Roy | Tom at the Farm (Tom à la ferme) |
| Best Supporting Actress | Romane Bohringer | Vic and Flo Saw a Bear (Vic et Flo ont vu un ours) |
| Best Supporting Actress | Gabrielle Rose | The Dick Knost Show |
| Best Director | Jeff Barnaby | Rhymes for Young Ghouls |
| Best Director | Louise Archambault | Gabrielle |
| Best Director | Matt Johnson | The Dirties |
| Best British Columbia Film | Benjamin Ratner | Down River |
| Best British Columbia Film | Charles Wilkinson | Oil Sands Karaoke |
| Best British Columbia Film | Jason DaSilva | When I Walk |
| Best Documentary | Chelsea McMullan | My Prairie Home |
| Best Documentary | Charles Wilkinson | Oil Sands Karaoke |
| Best Documentary | Jennifer Baichwal, Edward Burtynsky | Watermark |
