= Haida Modern =

2019 documentary

- International Festival Poster
- Directed by: Charles Wilkinson
- Produced by: Tina Schliessler; Charles Wilkinson; Kevin Eastwood
- Cinematography: Charles Wilkinson
- Edited by: Tina Schliessler; Charles Wilkinson
- Production companies: Shore Films; Optic Nerve Films
- Distributed by: Knowledge Network
- Release date: October 1, 2019 (Vancouver International Film Festival)
- Running time: 85 minutes
- Country: Canada
- Language: English

Haida Modern is a 2019 Canadian documentary film about the art and activism of Haida artist Robert Davidson. The film was directed by Charles Wilkinson, filmed, produced and edited by Wilkinson and Tina Schliessler and executive produced by Kevin Eastwood. It premiered at the 2019 Vancouver International Film Festival.

== Summary ==
The film traces Davidson's artistic career from his youth in Haida Gwaii and Vancouver studying with masters such as Bill Reid, and follows his education in the arts and in the history of the Indigenous Haida people from whom he is descended. It highlights the summer of 1969 when Davidson carved and raised a totem pole in his home village for the first time in nearly a century, marking the start of a "renaissance" for Indigenous art in popular culture. Robertson looks back on his 50 year career, his struggles as a child of the Canadian Indian residential school system, and his work as an activist for climate change and human rights.

== Release ==
Haida Modern had its world premiere at the 2019 Vancouver International Film Festival followed by screenings at numerous other International Film Festivals. It was the Closing Night Film at the 2020 Victoria Film Festival and was an official selection at the 2020 Hot Docs International Documentary Festival but was only screened online due to the COVID-19 pandemic. It had its broadcast television premiere on British Columbia's Knowledge Network on June 2, 2020, accompanied by a VOD release on Knowledge Network's streaming platform.

== Reception ==
The film was received favourably by audiences who saw it at film festivals, winning multiple "audience choice" awards: the Super Channel People's Choice Award for Most Popular Canadian Documentary at the Vancouver International Film Festival, and the Audience Choice Award for Best Canadian Documentary at the Available Light Film Festival.

Critical response was similarly favourable. Dana Gee of The Vancouver Sun called the film "a fascinating, entertaining and eye-opening look at the world-renowned artist" and in discussing her picks from the Vancouver International Film Festival on Global News, she said Haida Modern was "such a great movie - I loved it."

Marsha Lederman of The Globe and Mail wrote: "What this film cleverly and beautifully lays out is a deeper argument – that Davidson was a critical force in bringing Haida culture back to his people..."

== Awards ==
- 2021 Leo Awards
  - Winner: Best Feature Length Documentary
- 2020 Available Light Film Festival
  - Winner: Audience Choice Award, Best Canadian Documentary
- 2020 Directors Guild of Canada
  - Nominee: Allan King Award for Excellence in Documentary
- 2020 Festival International du Film sur l'Art - Artfifa (Le FIFA)
  - Winner: Cineplex Odeon Quartier Latin Award for Best Canadian Work
- 2019 Vancouver International Film Festival
  - Winner: Super Channel People's Choice Award for Most Popular Canadian Documentary
