= Daniel Bartholomew-Poyser =

Canadian orchestral conductor

Daniel Bartholomew-Poyser is a Canadian orchestral conductor. He is best known for creating and conducting shows designed to introduce orchestral music to groups outside of its traditional audiences, such as by blending classical with contemporary genres and centring on themes targeted to groups who do not typically attend the symphony.

A native of Montreal, Quebec but growing up in Calgary, Alberta, he attended William Aberhart High School, and studied music at the University of Calgary and the Royal Northern College of Music. He taught music at Calgary's Glenmore Christian Academy for several years before returning to conducting and coming out as gay. He has since served as an associate conductor of the Kitchener-Waterloo Symphony and the Thunder Bay Symphony Orchestra, as artist in residence and community outreach coordinator with Symphony Nova Scotia, and as an education conductor and community ambassador for the Toronto Symphony Orchestra, as well as appearing as a guest conductor with orchestras including the San Francisco Symphony, the Vancouver Symphony Orchestra, the Calgary Philharmonic Orchestra, the Hamilton Philharmonic Orchestra, the Edmonton Symphony Orchestra, the National Arts Centre Orchestra, the Baltimore Symphony Orchestra, the Regina Symphony Orchestra and the Washington National Opera. Most recently, he gave his conducting debut at Lincoln Center with the New York Philharmonic. He conducted one of the orchestra's famous Young People's Concerts.

On the evening of August 18, 2023, he guest conducted the Los Angeles Philharmonic at the Hollywood Bowl in an all-Tchaikovsky concert which concluded with the 1812 Overture and a ferocious fireworks display. Admitting he had never conducted with a fireworks display, he promised just to keep going when the fireworks started, and he did, to great applause and approval.

His shows have included The Long River, a 2018 performance with Symphony Nova Scotia and folk musician J.P. Cormier dedicated to the music of Gordon Lightfoot, and Soul Legends: From Isaac Hayes to Marvin Gaye, a program of soul and rhythm and blues music which he performed with the Nova Scotia Youth Orchestra and the Calgary Philharmonic in 2019.

Disruptor Conductor, a 2019 television documentary film by Sharon Lewis, profiled Bartholomew-Poyser's work on four shows in 2018: a string quartet performance for prisoners at the Grand Valley Institution for Women; a show with the Toronto Symphony Orchestra designed to accommodate the special needs of children with autism; a show with the San Francisco Symphony which connected classical performance with African music by incorporating African drumming performed by Magatte Sow; and "Thorgy and the Thorchestra", a show centred around LGBTQ and drag culture starring drag performer and classical violinist Thorgy Thor. The film was broadcast by CBC Television on September 5, 2019, as an episode of CBC Docs POV.

Since 2021, he has been the host of Centre Stage, a weekend classical music program on the CBC Music radio network.

He has also been acting as current conductor for the Toronto Symphony Orchestra doing many concerts for school concerts and the TSO's relaxed concerts for children and those with Autism.

It is noted that Bartholomew-Poyser will become the music director of the National Youth Orchestra of Canada and Chef principal inveté at L'ensemble obiora à Montréal.
