= Emergency Room: Life + Death at VGH =

- Genre: Documentary
- Directed by: Kevin Eastwood
- Music by: Terry Frewer
- Country of origin: Canada
- Original language: English

Production
- Executive producers: Louise Clark; Andrew Williamson; Murray Battle; Kevin Eastwood
- Producer: David Moses
- Cinematography: Zachary Williams
- Editors: Tanya Maryniak, Joanna Gyurkovics, Eddie O.
- Running time: 48 to 56 minutes
- Production company: Lark Productions

Original release
- Network: Knowledge Network
- Release: 21 January 2014 – 21 February 2017

Emergency Room: Life + Death at VGH is a medical documentary series which premiered on British Columbia's Knowledge Network on January 21, 2014. It follows doctors, nurses and staff at Vancouver General Hospital (VGH) as they cope with real patients from the Greater Vancouver Regional District. VGH is the second largest hospital in Canada and one of 3 level I trauma centres in BC. Stories of stabbings, car accidents, heart attacks, and life-threatening disease are shown alongside everyday cuts and sprains, drunks, and other minor cases, and episodes contain graphic images of wounds, blood, and/or routine and invasive medical procedures.

The series was directed and co-executive produced by Kevin Eastwood, produced by David Moses, and executive produced by Andrew Williamson and Louise Clark of Lark Productions.

== Episodes (Season 1) ==
#	Episode	Original airdate	Episode Summary (from Official Site)
1	No Typical Day	21 January 2014	Dr. Campbell tells us there's no typical day in the ER, as he examines a patient with a 10" blade sticking out of his chest. The gurneys rush past into a world filled with shocked hearts, broken bones poking through skin, and a battle against Darwinism. We meet Dr. Gill who must intubate a patient who can't move his neck and treat a nurse who has had blood splash in her eyes. Dr. Theoret's shift throws him into a race against the clock while awaiting the arrival of a tragic stabbing case.
2	Talk To Me	28 January 2014	If the ability to communicate with a patient is one of the most important diagnostic tools available to caregivers, the staff of the ER are in for a challenge. While Dr. McKnight must discover how to talk with a deaf and blind patient in order to form a diagnosis, Donna, a registered nurse, meets a dog who can tell her when a patient is about to have a seizure. We learn giving information is sometimes as difficult as getting it as Deb, the ER's social worker, must share terrible news with one patient's mother.
3	Full Moon	4 February 2014	The full moon plays havoc with the ER. Landon, the Charge Nurse, tries to prevent the ER from being overwhelmed when a growing number of victims of apparently random attacks arrive in the trauma bay. An outbreak of bedbugs is averted and Dr. Shirzad treats Krista, an ER nurse who collapses on duty. Dr. Campbell takes the lead on a cardiac arrest, where he is faced with a doctor's most difficult decision – whether to continue or cease efforts to resuscitate a dying patient.
4	Downtown	11 February 2014	Operating an emergency room in a large city presents its own unique challenges for the ER. Paramedics Rick and Kelly extend the reach of the ER into the streets of the city and provide on-site treatment to all levels of Vancouver's social spectrum in one shift. Registered nurses, Maddie and Patty, have to take measures to combat the ER's daily dose of violence and drug abuse, while Dr. Rose treats an accident from a construction site and faces the horror of a multi-vehicle collision, with a quickly depleting blood supply.
5	The Donor	18 February 2014	The staff of the ER are reminded of their connection to the community and a world of give and take. Dr. Theoret sees a guitar playing walk-in patient with a twisted knee and Dr. Morrison treats a woman who shattered her pelvis in a fall. The Air Ambulance brings in cases from across the province, including the victim of a severe motorcycle accident to Dr. Campbell. TJ, one of the ER nurses, is awarded a Queen's Jubilee Medal for her outstanding military service and a patient's family provides a stranger with a precious gift.
6	Watch Me	25 February 2014	It is a day of beginnings and endings as Marwa, a young Unit Co-ordinator begins her training with Yasmin while Carolle, a veteran social worker, starts her final shift before retiring from a lifetime of service. VGH is also a teaching hospital where students from across the province, and the country, come to do their residency. We follow the challenges Drs. Campbell, Shirzad and Lee face as they mentor several residents who may become the next generation of ER physicians.

== Episodes (Season 2) ==
#	Episode	Original airdate	Episode Summary (from Official Site)
1	We Turn No One Away	12 April 2016	Triage sorts through bike accidents, severed fingers, a patient who has fallen off a mountain and one who barely needs a bandage. No case, large or small, is turned away by the emergency department of Vancouver General Hospital...and it is taking its toll.
2	Mondays	19 April 2016	Mondays are the worst in the emergency department, with staff tackling a wide range of medical emergencies. Meanwhile, patients from the overflowing psychiatric assessment unit have filled up the beds and some are literally fighting to get out.
3	Full Code	26 April 2016	The staff faces overwhelming traffic from elderly patients suffering a range of medical issues. Doctors and nurses struggle with the conflicting issues of "living long" versus "living well".
4	Summer	3 May 2016	Summer hits the ER and the air conditioning is down. From a nail in a boot to an agonizing escharotomy following a severe burn, everybody is feeling the heat.
5	Nurses	10 May 2016	Its last days at VGH for Jo-Anne, the matriarch/charge nurse of the ER. Despite being surrounded by pain and suffering on a daily basis, most nurses love the challenge and share their secrets to surviving in "Emerge".
6	Going Home	17 May 2016	In an episode that's full of life-saving technology, remarkable treatments and heartwarming recoveries, we witness ER staff, patients and family members confront the limitations of medicine and face the truth of their own mortality.

== Episodes (Season 3) ==
#	Episode	Original airdate	Episode Summary (from Official Site)
1	Christmas Eve	21 February 2017	The bustle as people get ready for the holidays makes for a busy emergency room. Icy roads, a distracted meat slicer and hours of travel are recipes for Christmas heartbreaks and disasters big and small...but it also brings some surprisingly uplifting moments.
2	New Year's Eve	28 February 2017	The Emergency Department prepares for one of the busiest nights in the ER — but also make time to ring in the new year with fellow staff.

== Development and Production ==
The series was conceived by Knowledge Network CEO Rudy Buttignol to depict the everyday experiences of the medical personnel who care for people in crisis. Lark Productions, Vancouver General Hospital and Vancouver Coastal Health partnered to develop the series, and spent six months in negotiations to decide how to give the production crew maximum access while ensuring no patients suffered privacy violations, and that proper consent was obtained from everyone who appeared on camera.

Filming took place over an 80-day period between February and May 2013.

Initially, some staff opted out of participating, thus requiring the production team to blur their faces if they appeared incidentally in a scene that was used in the final edit, but in the end, more than 2000 people gave their consent to appear in the show. The camera crew also avoided filming certain patients undergoing mental health issues, due to the difficulty of obtaining informed consent, but were present for dozens of other traumas without complaint from hospital staff or patients.

== Release ==
Episode 1, "No Typical Day" premiered on January 21, 2014 and was the most watched program in its time-slot, as well as the biggest documentary series premiere in Knowledge Network's history. Episode 3, "Full Moon", was given a special big screen presentation at the DOXA Documentary Film Festival in Vancouver on May 4, 2014 at which Eastwood, Murray Battle of Knowledge Network and members of the cast gave a Q&A. In total, Season 1 was watched by over 1.2 million online and TV viewers.

Season 2 was shot over 80 days, and launched in April 2016.

Season 3 is the finale of the series - shot during December 2015 - and was screened theatrically in December 2016 at the Vancity Theatre. The two finale episodes were broadcast on Knowledge Network in February 2017.

== Critical reception ==
Patrick Darbyshire of The Province called it "the most gripping dramatic series to watch online right now [over House of Cards on Netflix]" and said it was "as gripping and emotional as any TV medical show — and a lot more realistic than House."

Pamela Fayerman of the Vancouver Sun wrote "It has gripping life-and-death drama, a fast pace, and all the mayhem of a Hollywood action film...For unpredictable drama and insights into the mindsets of health professionals who choose this line of chaotic work, the series seems unbeatable." Marsha Lederman of the Globe and Mail wrote that the series "tiptoes through an ethical minefield in order to deliver what its creators strongly believe is important television; a peek behind the curtain at the hugely pressing issue of public health care.". And Vancouver Magazine said "no matter how cynical, expect too to fall in love with the driven, selfless adrenaline junkies who return shift after shift to this impossible job." VGH emergency staff also spoke highly of the program. ER physician Dr. Shahin Shirzhad, featured in the show, told Global News: "We’re often dealing with resource issues, bed problems, not enough space or money to prepare care for everybody the way we’d like to...I think it’s been good at giving a very realistic picture of what we experience."

== Awards ==
Emergency Room won two Leo Awards: Best Documentary Series and the People's Choice Award for Favourite TV Series. The show also won a Golden Sheaf Award for Best Documentary Series at the Yorkton Film Festival and was nominated for two Canadian Screen Awards: Best Factual Series and Best Direction in a Documentary or Factual Series. In addition, the Vancouver Coastal Health Communications & Public Affairs department, which participated in the making of Emergency Room, won a Silver Leaf Award of Excellence and Bronze Quill Award of merit from the International Association of Business Communicators (IABC) for its Employee Engagement division submission.

== Director's Cardiac Arrest ==
During a break in filming, director Kevin Eastwood traveled to Los Angeles on business with a colleague, writer/actress Sonja Bennett. Outside a car rental office, Eastwood suffered a sudden cardiac arrest and collapsed. Bennett dialed 911 and administered CPR until an ambulance arrived. Paramedics used defibrillators to shock Eastwood's heart repeatedly until his pulse returned. He was then taken to Ronald Reagan UCLA Medical Center and put in an induced coma for three days. When he awoke, he had a cardioverter-defibrillator surgically implanted in his chest. He has since made full recovery. Eastwood told The Georgia Straight that by the time he returned to filming at Vancouver General Hospital, word of his incident had spread among the staff. "They're the ones who keep underscoring how incredibly rare it is for somebody who has that kind of spontaneous cardiac arrest to, first of all, survive, and even those who survive, there are a small percentage who do not have brain damage. Less than 10 per cent survive in the first place, and a fraction of those are not permanently damaged." "This show changed my life," Eastwood says.
