= Jihadunspun.com =

Canadian news website

Jihad Unspun
- Website type: News
- Owner: Khadija Abdul Qahaar (née Beverly Anne Giesbrecht)
- Website: JihadUnspun.com

JihadUnspun.com was a Canadian news website. It was launched on April 21, 2002, and had a stated aim to present uncensored reporting of the United States' "war on terrorism" on a global scale and reporting also news from several jihad groups. Its articles were often highly critical of American foreign policy and military interventions in especially Muslim countries. It was claimed by its critics to be a hate-ridden supremacist website.

== Website ownership and content ==
The owner and publisher of Jihad Unspun was Beverly Anne Giesbrecht (1953–2010), a semi-retired Canadian publishing entrepreneur and convert to Islam, who called herself Khadija Abdul Qahaar (she was also known by the pseudonyms Beverly Kennedy and Paul Morris-Read). A former Catholic, she began a period of intensive research on the history of the American relationship with the Middle East after 9/11, converting to Islam as well. The news portal was named after Jihad vs. McWorld, political scientist Benjamin Barber's bestselling book on capitalism, factionalism, and world civilization.

== Webmaster kidnapped by Taliban ==
Giesbrecht was kidnapped on November 11, 2008, along with her translator, Salman Khan, and her driver, Zar Muhammad, near the Afghanistan-Pakistan border. In late February 2009, a video surfaced of her, in between two men with rifles, in which she states: "I have been in captivity for almost three months. I wake up in the dark, and I go to sleep in the dark." In March 2009, a video surfaced on which Giesbrecht could be heard stating that the Pakistani Taliban would behead her unless a ransom was paid.

Muhammad was freed in June 2009. Khan was freed in July 2009. Giesbrecht later died of hepatitis.

== U.S. government view ==
The United States Department of State accused Jihad Unspun of spreading "disinformation appear[ing] to originate with Islam Memo, which is a pro-al Qaeda, pro-Iraqi insurgency, Arabic-language Web site based in Saudi Arabia."

== Controversy ==
Rita Katz, co-founder of the SITE institute, publicly speculated that JihadUnspun was a US government website "designed to find out who visits or orders videos glorifying bin Laden". Azzam Publications also questioned the website's authenticity.

Libertyforum.org argued that JihadUnspun was unlikely to be a genuine pro-jihad website, given the relative sophistication of the websites' content and design in comparison to other jihadi websites which only operate on a shoestring budget.
