= Dolphin Man =

2017 French film directed by Lefteris Charitos

- Directed by: Lefteris Charitos
- Written by: Yuri Averov; Lefteris Charitos
- Produced by: Ed Barreveld; Yuri Averov; Rea Apostolides; Estelle Robin You
- Starring: Jacques Mayol
- Cinematography: Stelios Apostolopoulos
- Edited by: Dave Kazala
- Music by: Mathieu Lamboley
- Distributed by: Films Transit International
- Release date: September 30, 2017
- Running time: 80 minutes
- Countries: France; Canada; Greece
- Language: English

Dolphin Man (French: L'Homme dauphin, sur les traces de Jacques Mayol) is a documentary film, directed by Lefteris Charitos and released in 2017. An international coproduction, the film profiles French diver Jacques Mayol.

In 2019, Dave Kazala received a Canadian Screen Award nomination for Best Editing in Documentary at the 7th Canadian Screen Awards.
