= Vik Adhopia =

Canadian journalist

Vik Adhopia is a senior health reporter who reports from Toronto, Canada for CBC News.

== Career ==
He attended Port Credit Secondary School in Mississauga, Ontario. After graduating from the University of Toronto with an Honours Bachelor of Arts in political science and from Ryerson Polytechnical Institute with a Bachelor of Applied Arts in journalism, Adhopia joined the CBC in 1995 where he reported from Toronto, Ontario. In 1997, he moved on to Iqaluit while continuing to work for the CBC. He worked as a reporter in Vancouver and, in 2006, Adhopia began working in St. John's as a CBC National Reporter.

A report from Prince George, British Columbia about the doctor shortage won him a Jack Webster Award in 2001. In addition, he was awarded Radio and Television News Directors Association Awards in 2004 for his reports on flooding in British Columbia and in 2008 for his coverage of the Newfoundland Breast Cancer Scandal.

Adhopia has worked for the CBC bureau in Washington, DC and covered the War in Afghanistan in 2010.

== Awards and recognition ==
In 2015, Adhopia joined the Health Unit at CBC News in Toronto where he reports on health-related news stories.

In 2009, Adhopia was presented the Canadian Association of Journalists award for faith and spirituality along with fellow CBC journalists including Curt Petrovich and Frank Koller for their work on CBC Radio's Where is God Today?. In 2018, he was part of a months-long CBC News investigative series on the medical implant industry which found that devices pulled from the market internationally due to safety concerns continued to be implanted in Canadians, sometimes with unwanted consequences. The series, The Implant Files, produced in partnership with Radio-Canada and the Toronto Star, under the auspices of the International Consortium of Investigative Journalists, earned a Michener Award nomination in 2019.
