= Massey Whiteknife =

Canadian producer, businessman, and entertainer

Massey Whiteknife is a Canadian producer, businessman, and entertainer. He is the CEO of the ICEIS Group of Companies, an occupational safety and health and sustainable development consulting firm in the Athabasca oil sands region of Alberta, and is also a pop singer, performing as ICEIS Rain.

== Life ==
A Cree member of the Mikisew Cree First Nation originally from Conklin, Alberta, he moved to Fort McMurray as a teenager to complete high school. Having faced both childhood sexual abuse and bullying as a teenager because he was gay, he first discovered his female Two-Spirit of ICEIS Rain after being diagnosed with post-traumatic stress disorder during this era. According to Whiteknife, Iceis Rain helped him to become more secure and confident in himself and his business career, and to heal from his childhood emotional traumas.

He later launched the ICEIS Group with interests in health and safety training and environmentally friendly industrial cleaning products.

With few conventional gay social venues in Fort McMurray, Whiteknife began going out to karaoke bars to perform as ICEIS Rain. He appeared in the 2013 documentary film Oil Sands Karaoke, and is depicted on the film's promotional poster. He also produced the film God's Acre in 2016.

He released the EP The Queen in 2014. The album garnered five nominations at the 2014 Aboriginal Peoples Choice Music Awards, in the categories of Songwriter of the Year, Best Music Video, Single of the Year, Best Rock CD and Best New Artist, and he was the first out gay or two-spirit person ever to perform live at the ceremony.

In 2018, he was featured in the APTN documentary series Queen of the Oil Patch.
