= Peace Out (film) =

- Directed by: Charles Wilkinson
- Screenplay by: Charles Wilkinson
- Produced by: Charles Wilkinson; Tina Schliessler
- Cinematography: Charles Wilkinson
- Edited by: Tina Schliessler
- Production company: Shore Films
- Distributed by: IndieCan Entertainment
- Release date: October 4, 2011 (VIFF)
- Running time: 80 minutes
- Country: Canada
- Language: English

Peace Out is a Canadian documentary film, directed by Charles Wilkinson and released in 2011. The film is a portrait of the conflict between economic and environmental issues around the development of various energy projects, including oil, hydroelectricity and nuclear power, in Grande Prairie and the Peace River Country region of Alberta.

The film premiered at the 2011 Vancouver International Film Festival, where it won the award for Most Popular Canadian Documentary. It was later screened at the 2012 Hot Docs Canadian International Documentary Festival, where it won the Special Jury Prize from the Best Canadian Feature Documentary jury.
