= Anna M. M. Vetticad =

Indian author

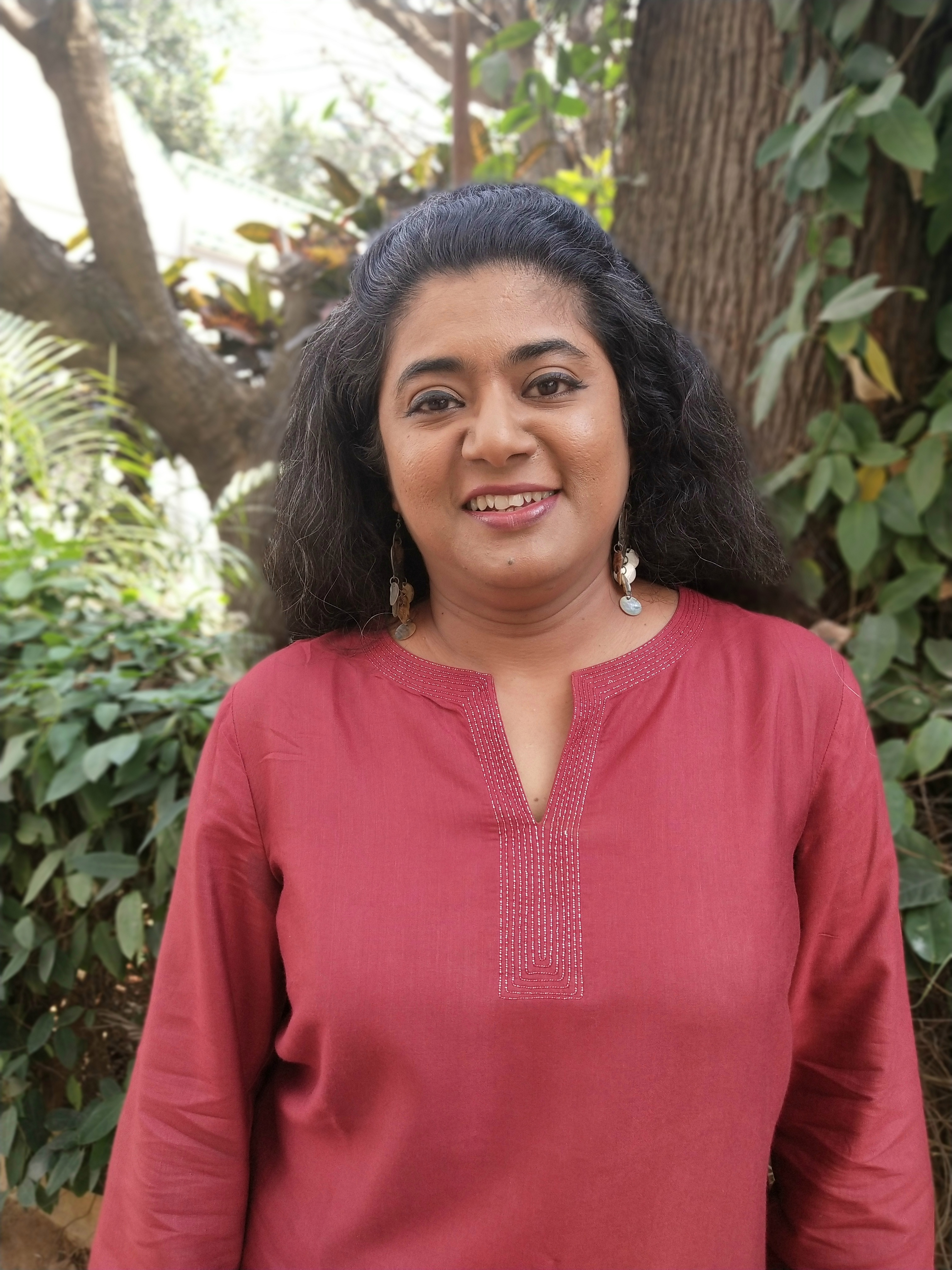
- Vetticad in 2020
- Born: Anna Marie Mathew Vetticad; 2 June; Delhi, India
- Occupations: Film critic; book author; columnist; social media consultant
- Years active: 1994–present
- Known for: Author of The Adventures of an Intrepid Film Critic

Anna Marie Mathew Vetticad is an Indian journalist, film critic, and cultural commentator. She has been in the field of journalism since 1994. Vetticad is known for her political critiques of Indian cinema and the Indian film industry. She is an advocate for women's empowerment and the representation of marginalised communities in popular entertainment.

== Early life ==
Vetticad was born to Malayali parents in Delhi. She completed her schooling from the Convent of Jesus and Mary, Delhi.

== Career ==
She has worked with India Today (1994–2002) and The Indian Express (2002–2005) before switching to television. She worked with Headlines Today till 2011. She is based in Delhi. She also used to write columns in leading magazines and newspapers, including India Today, The New Indian Express, The Indian Express, and The Hindu. She was a visiting faculty of the Indian Institute of Mass Communication, Delhi.

Vetticad is the author of the book The Adventures of an Intrepid Film Critic (2012), an overview of Indian society as seen through the prism of the Hindi film industry and presented through an account of a year in which she watched every single Hindi film released in India’s National Capital Region. The book features a Foreword by Ranbir Kapoor.

=== Film criticism and investigative reporting ===
Vetticad's film criticism frequently intersects with social justice, gender issues, and media ethics. In March 2024, she published a widely cited investigative review in Himal Southasian analyzing the Academy Award-nominated documentary To Kill a Tiger. In the piece, Vetticad pointed out a significant oversight in the film's international reception, arguing that the production had potentially violated India's strict child-protection laws by filming and broadcasting the face and identifying details of the central rape survivor while she was still a minor.

The essay featured legal analysis from Supreme Court of India Senior Advocate Rebecca Mammen John, who questioned whether the filmmakers had secured the mandatory Special Court permission required under Section 23 of The Protection of Children from Sexual Offences (POCSO) Act. John noted that any privacy waiver signed by the survivor after reaching adulthood would not retroactively legitimize unauthorized filming done during her minority.

In the same essay, Vetticad challenged Western media frameworks regarding Indian privacy laws. Responding to a The New York Times review that characterized India's survivor-anonymity laws as a "shroud of shame," Vetticad argued that such laws are instead a vital "shield" designed to protect survivors from systemic social stigmatization, ostracization, and victim-blaming within a patriarchal society. She emphasized that Indian law does not deny agency to survivors, who remain free to self-disclose as adults, but rather serves to guard them against transgressions by unethical media entities.

=== Awards and recognition ===
She is a recipient of the Ramnath Goenka Award for Excellence in Journalism and was honored with the Chameli Devi Jain Award for Outstanding Woman Media Person of the Year in 2025 for her impactful cultural commentary and social commitment.

In 2016, she was the recipient of the Ramnath Goenka Excellence in Journalism Award in the Commentary and Interpretative Writing category for her monthly column "Film Fatale" in The Hindu Businessline.

In 2025, she was awarded the Chameli Devi Jain Award for Outstanding Woman Media Person by The Media Foundation for her "sharp analysis, her social commitment and skill in uncovering important truths through her diligent journalism." The accompanying citation commended her focus on the social and political landscape of contemporary India as viewed through the prism of mass entertainment, breaking new ground in cultural reportage by bypassing standard industry publicity in favor of a deeper societal understanding.
