= Charles Wilkinson (director) =

Canadian film and television director

- Born: c. 1959; Calgary, Alberta, Canada
- Occupation(s): Documentary filmmaker, film director, television director
- Years active: 1981–present
- Spouse: Tina Schliessler
- Website: charleswilkinson.com

Charles Wilkinson is a Canadian film and television director based in Vancouver, British Columbia, best known for making documentary films that touch on environmental issues.

Before moving into documentaries, Wilkinson worked for many years in dramatic television series and on narrative feature films.

As a preteen, he was one of the original performers in the Calgary Safety Roundup, paired with his brother Billy as kid cowboy singers. "We sang both kinds - country and western."

== Filmography ==
=== Film ===
- Tiers: A Story of the Penitentiary - 1982
- My Kind of Town - 1984
- The Little Town That Did - 1984
- Quarantine - 1989
- Blood Clan - 1990
- Max - 1994
- Breach of Trust, aka Crash - 1995
- Airprentice - 2006
- Down Here - 2008
- Peace Out - 2011
- Oil Sands Karaoke - 2013
- Haida Gwaii: On the Edge of the World - 2015
- Vancouver: No Fixed Address - 2017
- Haida Modern - 2019
- Gyaa Isdlaa: Beyond Being Silenced - 2023
- Talk About Lonely - 2025

=== Television ===
- The Beachcombers - 1986, one episode
- High Country - 1989, television film
- The Highlander - 1994-97, four episodes
- Road to Avonlea - 1995, one episode
- The Legend of the Ruby Silver - 1996, television film
- Angel Flight Down - 1996, television film
- Seduction in a Small Town - 1997, television film
- Out of Nowhere - 1997, television film
- Dead Man's Gun - 1998, two episodes
- Welcome to Paradox - 1998, two episodes
- So Weird - 1999, two episodes
- 2gether - 2000, two episodes
- Los Luchadores - 2000-01, one episode
- The Immortal - 2001, one episode
- A Crime of Passion - 2003, television film
- Heart of the Storm - 2004, television film

== Awards ==
Award	Date of ceremony	Category	Work	Result	Ref.
Directors Guild of Canada	2012	DGC Allan King Award for Best Documentary Film	Peace Out	Nominated	
Directors Guild of Canada	2016	DGC Allan King Award for Best Documentary Film	Haida Gwaii: On the Edge of the World	Won	
Directors Guild of Canada	2020	DGC Allan King Award for Best Documentary Film	Haida Modern	Nominated	
Hot Docs Canadian International Documentary Festival	2012	Best Canadian Feature Documentary	Peace Out	Jury Prize	
Hot Docs Canadian International Documentary Festival	2015	Best Canadian Feature Documentary	Haida Gwaii: On the Edge of the World	Won	
Vancouver Film Critics Circle	2013	Best Canadian Documentary	Oil Sands Karaoke	Nominated	
Vancouver Film Critics Circle	2013	Best British Columbia Film	Oil Sands Karaoke	Nominated	
Vancouver Film Critics Circle	2015	Best British Columbia Film	Haida Gwaii: On the Edge of the World	Won	
Vancouver Film Critics Circle	2015	Best Director of a British Columbia Film	Haida Gwaii: On the Edge of the World	Won	
Vancouver International Film Festival	2011	Most Popular Canadian Documentary	Peace Out	Won	
Vancouver International Film Festival	2015	Most Popular Canadian Documentary	Haida Gwaii: On the Edge of the World	Won	
Vancouver International Film Festival	2019	Most Popular Canadian Documentary	Haida Modern	Won	
