= Marianne Ignace =

Canadian linguist and anthropologist

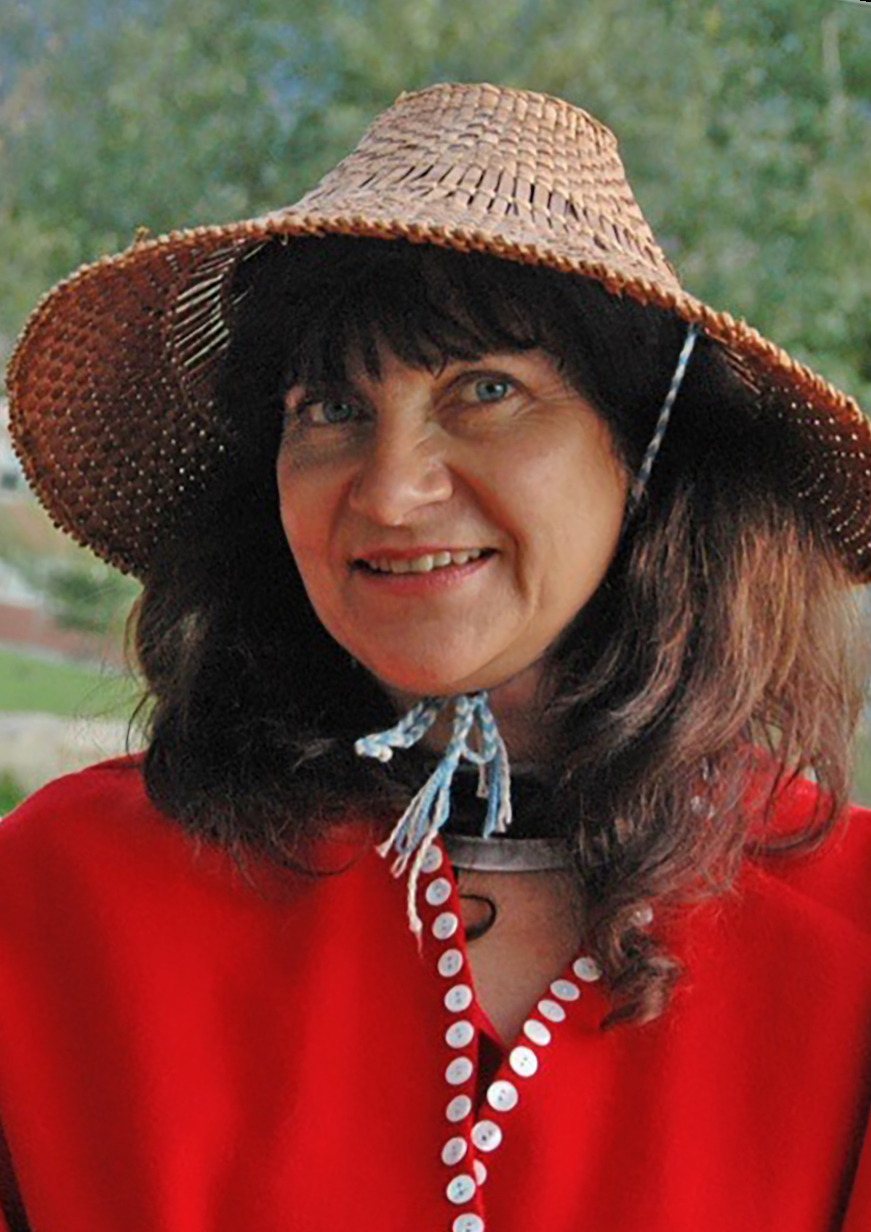
- Marianne Ignace, in 2008
- Born: 1954 (age 71–72); Germany
- Spouse: Ronald Ignace

Academic background
- Education: PhD, Anthropology, 1985, Simon Fraser University
- Thesis: The curtain within: the management of social and symbolic classification among the Masset Haida (1985)

Academic work
- Institutions: Simon Fraser University

Marianne Boelscher Ignace FRSC (born 1954) is a Canadian linguist and anthropologist. Married into the Shuswap people, she is a Full professor in the departments of Linguistics and Indigenous Studies at Simon Fraser University (SFU), and Director of SFU's Indigenous Languages Program and First Nations Language Centre. In 2020, Ignace was elected a Fellow of the Royal Society of Canada for her work in revitalizing and preserving indigenous languages.

== Early life and education ==
Ignace was born in 1954 in Germany. She travelled to British Columbia in the late 1970s to continue her education in the community of Old Massett on Haida Gwaii, and was adopted by the elders of the Yahgu ‘laanaas Raven clan. She earned her PhD in Anthropology from Simon Fraser University (SFU) in 1985 with her dissertation titled The curtain within: the management of social and symbolic classification among the Masset Haida.

== Career ==
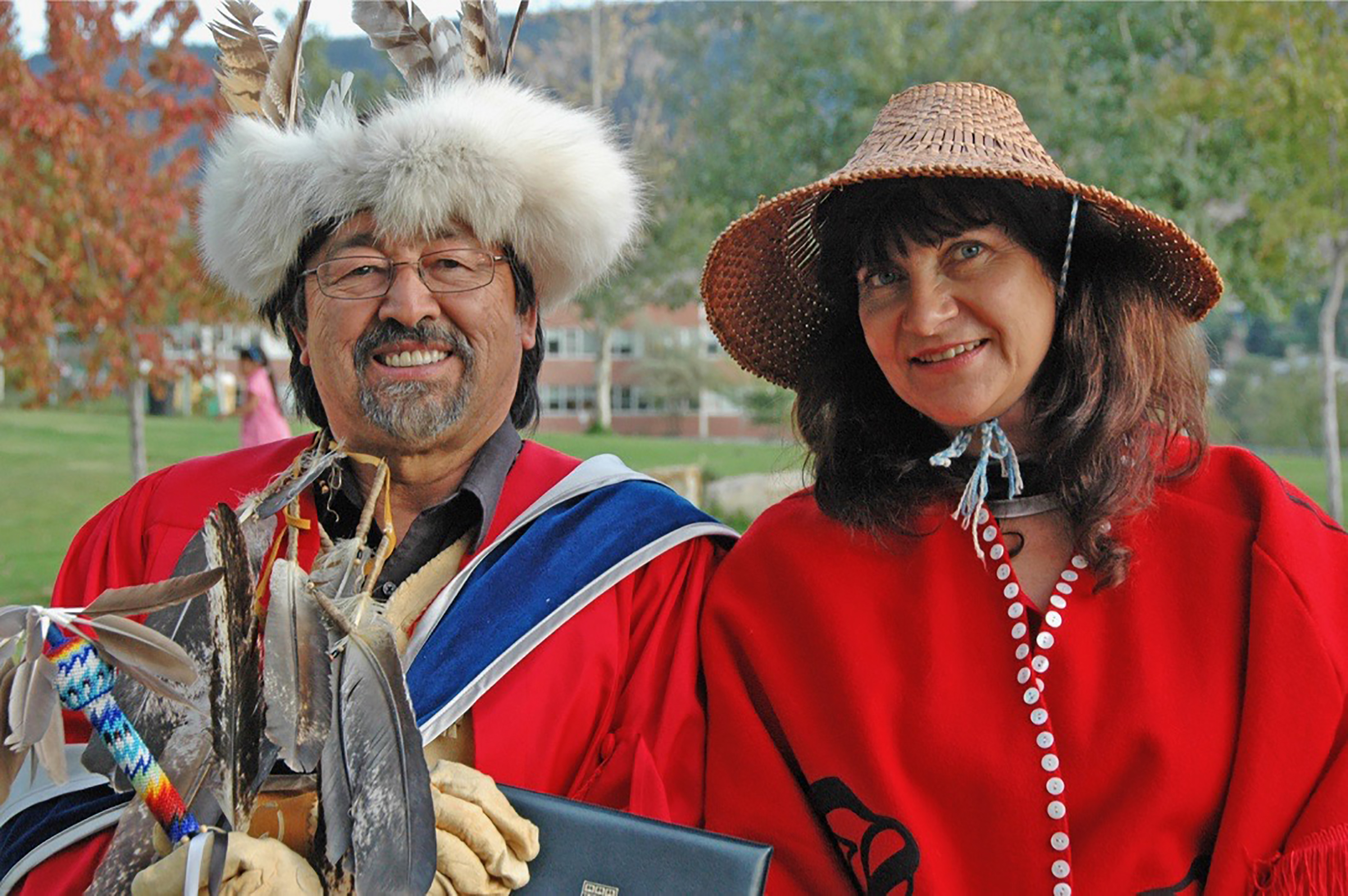
Chief Ron Ignace and Ignace during the 2008 Kamloops convocation ceremony

Upon receiving her PhD, Ignace and her husband Chief Ron Ignace founded SFU's Kamloops satellite campus within the Shuswap nation. They were originally set up in an old Indian residential school before expanding into SFU's Kamloops campus. In their first year operating, they had twenty students before doubling that number in their second year. She was subsequently awarded a SFU's Outstanding Alumni Award for "academic achievements and service to the community" and the 2005 CUFA/BC Career Achievement Award. Along with their efforts, Ignace helped establish Shuswap as an optional second language in School District 73 Kamloops/Thompson. During the program's run, Ignace and her husband taught approximately 450 students, 90 per cent of which were First Nation adults who had never pursued a university education.

In 2013, Ignace was appointed the director of SFU's inaugural First Nations Language Centre and also received a $2.5-million partnership grant from the Social Sciences and Humanities Research Council of Canada (SSHRC) to preserve indigenous languages. While serving in this role, she helped establish the Tlli7sa Storybook app, a series of applications aimed at general education of First Nations cultural history and language. Ignace also helped create the First Nations Language Proficiency Certificate in order to combat extinction of the Squamish language.

A few years later, Ignace and her husband co-published A Secwépemc People, Land, and Laws: Yerí7 re Stsq'ey's-kucw through the McGill-Queen's University Press. Their book was "a model of collaborative approaches to Indigenous history", which included oral histories and 'western' scholarship from both Aboriginal and external sources. It eventually won the 2018 Basil Stuart-Stubbs Prize for outstanding Scholarly Book on British Columbia. In 2019, the couple received the Governor General's Award for Innovation "for developing a collaborative approach to research involving Indigenous people and communities". During the same year, Ignace won one of five SSHRC Impact Awards to fund her efforts to document and preserve British Columbia indigenous languages.

In 2020, Ignace was elected a Fellow of the Royal Society of Canada for her work in revitalizing and preserving indigenous languages.

== Personal life ==
Ignace and her husband have one daughter together, Julienne, who also graduated from Simon Fraser University.

== Selected publications ==
- Secwépemc People, Land, and Laws: Yerí7 re Stsq'ey's-kucw (2018)
