= Haida Gwaii: On the Edge of the World =

- Poster
- Directed by: Charles Wilkinson
- Produced by: Tina Schliessler; Charles Wilkinson; Kevin Eastwood; Murray Battle
- Cinematography: Charles Wilkinson
- Edited by: Tina Schliessler; Charles Wilkinson
- Production company: Shore Films Inc.
- Distributed by: Knowledge Network
- Release date: April 28, 2015 (Hot Docs)
- Running time: 74 minutes
- Country: Canada
- Language: English

Haida Gwaii: On the Edge of the World is a 2015 Canadian feature documentary film directed by Charles Wilkinson, and produced by Charles Wilkinson, Tina Schliessler, and Kevin Eastwood for the Knowledge Network. The film premiered on April 28, 2015 at the Hot Docs Canadian International Documentary Festival where it won the award for Best Canadian Feature Documentary.

== Synopsis ==
The film depicts a group of inhabitants living in Haida Gwaii, a remote archipelago off the Northwest coast of Canada. Recently named one of the "Must See Places in the World" by National Geographic, Haida Gwaii is widely regarded as one of the last and most pristine natural places on Earth. It is also one of the only places in North America where natives actually outnumber (and out-vote) non-natives. For over 10,000 years, the Haida people have survived wildly fluctuating sea levels, climate change and natural disasters. The film profiles a unique community of individuals from both groups who are all striving in different ways to restore balance to the islands, turn their economy around, and build a sustainable culture for the next generation.

== Release ==
Haida Gwaii: On the Edge of the World had its world premiere at the TIFF Bell Lightbox on April 28, 2015 as part of Hot Docs Canadian International Documentary Festival in Toronto. The Western Canadian premiere took place at The Vancouver Playhouse Theatre on September 29, 2015 as part of the Vancouver International Film Festival.

== Reception ==
The film was received favourably by several film critics:

Marsha Lederman of The Globe and Mail called it a "spectacular-looking documentary" and wrote: "So much more than a profile of [Haida Gwaii] and the cast of characters who populate it, this film captures the heart and heartbreak of the clashes it has seen, primarily over logging".

Adrian Mack of The Georgia Straight called it "a surprisingly ebullient (and spectacularly lensed)" film.

Greg Klymkiw of Film Corner said the film "might well provide the most persuasive aesthetic argument to save these islands at all costs". He also wrote: "Hats off to Wilkinson for crafting a film which walks tall, yet softly and carries the big stick of our ultimate salvation, the environment itself and, of course, its people, the Haida."

Jess Rogers of Matinee wrote "The genius of this movie... is that you see most of the sides of this people."

== Awards ==
At the 2015 Hot Docs Canadian International Documentary Festival, the film won the Best Canadian Feature Documentary Award.

At the 2015 Vancouver International Film Festival, the film won the award for Most Popular Canadian Documentary, based on audience balloting.

At the 2016 Vancouver Film Critics Circle Awards, the film won three awards: best Canadian Documentary, Best British Columbia Film and Best Director of a British Columbia Film.

At the 2016 Directors Guild of Canada Awards, the film won the Allan King Award for Excellence in Documentary.
