= The World Before Her =

- Directed by: Nisha Pahuja
- Written by: Nisha Pahuja
- Produced by: Ed Barreveld; Nisha Pahuja; Cornelia Principe; Andy Cohen
- Cinematography: Mrinal Desai; Derek Rogers
- Edited by: Dave Kazala
- Music by: Ken Myhr
- Production company: Storyline Entertainment
- Distributed by: KinoSmith (Canada); Ro*co Films
- Release date: November 2, 2012
- Running time: 90 minutes
- Country: Canada
- Language: English

The World Before Her is a 2012 Canadian documentary film written and directed by Nisha Pahuja and produced by Toronto's Emmy Award winning Storyline Entertainment. The film explores the complex and conflicting environment for young girls in India by profiling two young women participating in two very different types of training camp — Ruhi Singh, who aspires to become Miss India, and Prachi Trivedi, a Hindu nationalist with the Durga Vahini.

The film was nominated for an Emmy for Outstanding Coverage of a Current News Story in 2014. It also won the awards for Best Canadian Feature Documentary at the 2012 Hot Docs Canadian International Documentary Festival and Best Documentary Feature at the 2012 Tribeca Film Festival, and was a nominee for Best Feature Length Documentary at the 1st Canadian Screen Awards. The film won the award of Best International Documentary Film at the 2013 Byron Bay International Film Festival. The San Diego Asian Film Festival in 2012 gave the film a Special Jury Mention.

On June 6, 2014, the film was released to widespread critical acclaim in India, the country it depicts, with the help of filmmaker Anurag Kashyap. A critic for Firstpost called it "one of the most important, skillfully made and powerfully provocative films to come in a long time."
