= Curt Petrovich =

Canadian journalist

Curt Petrovich is a Canadian journalist. He has worked for the Canadian Broadcasting Corporation since 1986.

Petrovich is currently based in Vancouver, British Columbia. He has also worked for the CBC in Iqaluit, Winnipeg and Ottawa.

In 1999, Petrovich was awarded the Michener Award by Governor General Adrienne Clarkson for his coverage of a vote-splitting scandal in the 1995 Manitoba provincial election. Following interviews with Darryl Sutherland, Petrovich discovered that organizers of the Progressive Conservative Party had funded Independent Native Voice candidates to split the left-of-centre vote with the New Democratic Party in three constituencies.

He made the following comment about CBC management in 2005, following the Corporation's lockout of its workers:

"Why isn't someone trying to take back the controls from a bunch of box cutter-wielding ideologues who are ready to smash this organization into the pillars of public trust that took decades to build?"

In 2008, Petrovich's stories on the sale of MacDonald Dettwiler were named the best in radio reporting in British Columbia at the Jack Webster Awards.

In 2009, Petrovich was presented the Canadian Association of Journalists award for faith and spirituality along with fellow CBC journalists including Frank Koller and Vik Adhopia for their work on CBC Radio's Where is God Today?. In the same year, Petrovich was awarded another Jack Webster Award for Best Feature Story in radio for his feature on the Canadian Men's Eight Rowing Team.

In 2019, Petrovich authored "Blamed and Broken: The Mounties and the Death of Robert Dziekanski," an investigation into the aftermath of the Tasering of Robert Dziekanski at Vancouver's International Airport in 2007.
