= Nisha Pahuja =

Canadian independent filmmaker (born 1967)

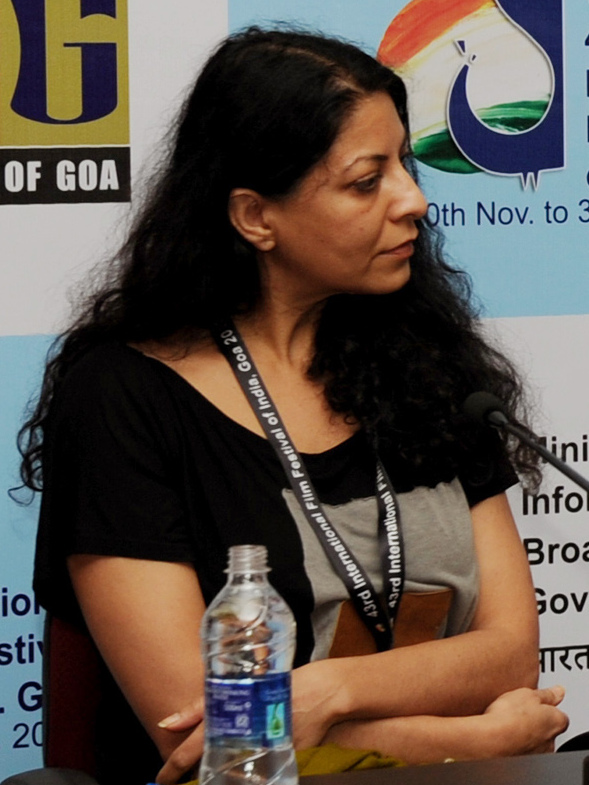
- Pahuja in 2012
- Born: 3 June 1967 (age 59); New Delhi, India
- Education: University of Toronto (BA)
- Occupations: Writer, filmmaker, artist

Nisha Pahuja (born 1967) is an Indian-born Canadian filmmaker, based in Toronto, Ontario.

Her credits include Academy Awards nominated documentary film To Kill a Tiger, winner of 19 awards from festivals including a Nomination at TIFF, Palm Springs International Film Festival, Doc Aviv, and the Canadian Screen awards. The film will be released theatrically in the US in the Fall of 2023. The New York Times included it in their list of "Most Anticipated Fall Releases" and Anne Thompson at the Indie Wire named it to her Oscars' Contenders list for 2024. Both Mindy Kaling and Dev Patel signed onto the film as Executive Producers along with Andy Cohen, Anita Lee, Atul Gawande, Andrew Dragoumis and others.

Pahuja's previous films include the Emmy nominated The World Before Her, the feature documentary Bollywood Bound and the three-part series Diamond Road.

This writer/artist/director was introduced to film through studying English literature, working in social services and through working as a documentary researcher. In 2014 Pahuja was invited to be a Resident Fellow at the Rockefeller Foundation Bellagio Center and later served on their arts selection panel from 2016-2020.

== Early life ==
Pahuja moved from India to Canada with her family when she was a child in the early 1970s. Growing up, Nisha faced adversity as she was bombarded with a new "western lifestyle". Growing up she was strongly influenced by Bollywood films but her creative inclinations were more geared to Literature.

== Career ==
Pahuja studied English Literature while attending Erindale College at the University of Toronto, with the intention of writing fiction. She graduated with a Bachelor of Arts in 1994. A chance meeting with local Canadian Producer, Geeta Sondhi, who hired her as a researcher on the CBC documentary "Some Kind of Arrangement" set her on the path to documentary filmmaking.

Pahuja chose to focus her efforts on documentary filmmaking specifically because she loved seeking real individuals with real stories who paint a great picture of bigger societal problems. Real stories attract her because, "A human being reveals themselves to you in such a profound kind of way. I think I was just really drawn to that, to the idea of real people, real stories and being able to connect to them.".

Early in her Career, Pahuja worked as a researcher with Canadian filmmakers John Walker and Ali Kazimi. Soon after, Pahuja began her own filmmaking career.

Her films have been successful internationally including North America and India. The World Before Her, which explored the complex and conflicting environment for young girls in India by following women participating in the Miss India Pageant as well as girls being trained in the Durga Vahini, the women's wing of the VHP. "The World Before Her" premiered at the Tribeca International Film Festival where is won the Best Documentary award. The film went on to screen at numerous festivals world-wide picking up several awards along the way including Best Canadian Documentary Hot Docs and the Vancouver Film Critics' Best Canadian Documentary Award.

After the 2012 Delhi gang rape case happened, Nisha became determined to screen her film The World Before Her across India in order to have an impact on women's rights and female foeticide and infanticide. Working with her team she raised funds through foundations and crowdsourcing. In order to pursue her dream, Nisha created a Kickstarter with the goal of reaching $50,000 The campaign surpassed its original goal by reaching $57,000.

In 2014, filmmaker Anurag Kashyap lent his name to the film in India, significantly boosting its release. Later, Pahuja and her team traveled to 4 states working with NGOs and women's rights organizations screening the film in underserved communities and holding in depth conversations with various audiences. The success of the Impact campaign convinced Pahuja of the importance of documentaries in creating social change at various levels.

"There are days on the road when the magnitude of what we’re hearing is overwhelming and I keep asking myself how can we make a change? Can we really be having an impact in the face of this? In a country that is systematically killing its girl children, what power does a film have or a motley crew of four even with the best of intentions? But it does, and we do because we’re listening and we’re challenging....Change happens in small shifts, often indiscernible, often immeasurable. And sometimes the best way to make that shift is through the simple act of sharing stories."

In 2022, Pahuja released the documentary To Kill a Tiger, which premiered at the 2022 Toronto International Film Festival and won the award for Best Canadian Feature Film.

== Awards and nominations ==
Nisha's feature film debut, Bollywood Bound, was a 2002 Gemini Award Nominee. In 2008, Nisha won the Gemini Award for Best Documentary Series for Diamond Road. Her third feature, The World Before Her earned Nisha an international following, winning awards along the festival circuit, including Best Documentary Feature and Jury Award Winner from the Tribecca Film Festival, Best Canadian Documentary from Hot Docs and TIFF's Canada's Top Ten.

Pahuja's latest film, To Kill a Tiger, had its world premiere at TIFF where it won the Amplify Voices Award for Best Canadian Feature Film. Since then, it has won 19 awards including Best Documentary Feature Palm Springs International Film Festival; three Canadian Screen awards including the Ted Rogers award for Best Feature Length Documentary 2023 and the Beyond the Screen Award at Doc Aviv 2023. To Kill a Tiger was voted a TIFF Canada's top ten and is slated for a US theatrical release in Fall 2023 . It also received an Oscar nomination for Best Documentary Feature in 2024

The World Before Her:
"Best Canadian Feature Documentary" (2012) at the Edmonton Film Festival,
"Best Documentary" (2012) at Hot Docs Canadian International Documentary Festival
"Best Foreign Film" (2012) Traverse City Film Festival
"Best International Document" (2013) Byron Bay International Film Festival

"Special Jury Mention" (2012) at the San Diego Asian Film Festival
"Best Documentary Feature" (2012) at the Tribeca Film Festival
"VFCC" Award for Best Screenplay at the Vancouver Film Critics Circle (2012)
"Best Documentary" (2012) at the Warsaw International Film Festival
This film also had nominations in:
Zurich Film Festival (2012) for "Best Documentary"
Genie Awards (2012) for "Ted Rogers Best Feature Length Documentary"
Canadian Screen Awards (2013) "Best Feature Length Documentary"
Santa Barbara Film Festival (2013) "Social Justice Award for Documentary Film"

== Filmography ==
- Bollywood Bound (2003)
- Diamond Road (2007)
- The World Before Her (2012)
- To Kill a Tiger (2022)
