= Yorkton Film Festival =

Film festival

- Yorkton Film Festival Logo
- Location: Yorkton, Saskatchewan, Canada
- Founded: -1947 as Yorkton International Film Festival −1981 renamed as Yorkton International Short Film and Video Festival −1983 renamed as Yorkton Short Film and Video Festival
- Film titles: Short films
- Hosted by: Yorkton International Film Festival Society
- Festival date: Held annually in May
- Website: www.yorktonfilm.com

Yorkton Film Festival (YFF) is an annual film festival held in late May in Yorkton, Saskatchewan, Canada.

In 1947, the Yorkton Film Council (YFC) was founded and in 1950 the first international documentary film festival officially opened in western Canada on 11 October. The festival originally was named Yorkton International Documentary Film Festival and latter become known as Yorkton International Film Festival.

In 1969, the Yorkton Film Council disbanded and the Yorkton International Film Festival Society was formed. The film festival went through several name changes and currently operates as Yorkton Film Festival. It is known as the longest running film festival held in North America.

The festival is open to Canadian productions, or international productions directed by Canadians, and focuses on films that are under 60 minutes in length. It is a qualifying festival for the Canadian Screen Awards.

The Yorkton Film Festival includes awards in 29 categories: 18 main categories, 6 accompanying categories, 3 craft categories and 2 special categories as of 2019. In 2020 the festival will include a new category for Mental Health, sponsored by the Mental Health Drop-in Centre for three years. The festival will be the first in Canada to Include an award for this category.

== Background ==
=== National Film Board of Canada ===
During World War II, the National Film Board of Canada (NFB) instituted a program for Canadians during the war through the projection of NFB films across Canada. Under the leadership of John Grierson, the NFB films produced and distributed nationally and internationally during this time were focused on a range of cultural, technical and educational themes; including the war series,"Canada Carries On" and "The World in Action."

After the war ended, the NFB was faced with a series of budget cuts, which led to the development of film councils across Canada. Under this new system, the NFB would provide the films, and bare the operational costs, to those cities that formed film councils, secured their own projector and organized their own screenings. In 1947, the Yorkton Film Council was established to participate in this program.

=== James (Jim) Lysyshyn ===
In 1947, Jim Lysyshyn, a National Film Board field officer, was developing the idea of creating a documentary film festival in Yorkton. Having heard that the Edinburgh Festival of the Arts was planning to add film sections to their festival, Lysyshyn believed that the Yorkton Film Council was in the position to take similar action. He was successful in convincing the council members of the merits of this project and first international film festival was scheduled for 1950.

=== Antoinette (Nettie) Kryski ===
Nettie Kryski's work with the Yorkton Film Council began in 1947 during a meeting held by the NFB representative and various organizations to discuss the creation of a film council in Yorkton. As the film council's secretary, she wrote letters to various countries requesting films entries which resulted in 40 films being submitted to the first festival held in 1950. In 1979 she was awarded the Golden Sheaf for her hard work and dedication to the Yorkton Film Festival. * In 2012, Nettie Kryski's hard work was acknowledged at the festival's 65th anniversary celebration.

== History ==
=== Chronology ===
- In 1947, the Yorkton Film Council (YFC) was founded.
- In 1950, the first international film festival was held in Western Canada. The Yorkton International Documentary Film Festival officially opened on 11 October in Yorkton, Saskatchewan. The event ran for two-days, 11 and 12 October. Yorkton hosted a film workshop in conjunction with the festival, which was attended by 13 film councils and 30 film committees. James Lysyshyn described the festival's purpose: "to extend public interest in films; to place documentary films on a higher level; and to give the public a better knowledge of film usage." There were film entries from Switzerland, United States, National Film Board of Canada, Crawley Films of Canada, Sweden, India, Norway, United Kingdom, Denmark, Brazil, New Zealand, Netherlands, Canadian Forestry Association, and France. Prior to the film festival in Yorkton, festivals had been held internationally in London, Edinburgh, Brussels, Paris, Locarno and Venice.
- In 1952, the second international film festival was held in Yorkton on 16 and 17 October. Entries were accepted in the following categories: agriculture, sociological, general, non-theatrical and cultural (i.e. music and art). Forty-seven films were entered in the festival from multiple countries. Exhibitors included the National Film Board of Canada, Crawley Films Limited, France, Sweden, India, Norway, United Kingdom, J. Arthur Rank Film distributors, Denmark, Australia, New Zealand, South Africa, Switzerland, Encyclopædia Britannica of U.S.A., Netherlands, Belgium, Germany, Fred G. Bard of Regina, P.G.A. Films Limited. The amateur exhibitors were Ralph Steuck of Abernethy, H. Ferman of Yorkton and J. Hoehn of Regina. An extra day was added to accommodate their screening schedule, making the festival a three-day event. The guest speaker at the festival's dinner was W. S. Jobbins from the National Film Board.
- In 1953, the Yorkton Film Council joined the Federation of Film Councils of Northern Saskatchewan, formed under the auspices of the National Film Board of Canada.
- In 1954, the third international film festival was held in Yorkton on 20, 21 October and 23. The three-day event, received strong support from community members. The exhibitors included the National Film Board of Canada, Crawley Films Limited, Sweden, India, United Kingdom, J. Arthur Rank Film Distributors of Canada, Denmark, Australia, New Zealand, South Africa, Netherlands, Germany and Imperial Oil by Christopher Capman. J. Soehn of Regina was the only amateur exhibitor. Mrs. A. L. Caldwell, board of governors of the National Film Board of Canada was a guest speaker at the festival's dinner. Mayor, C. G. Langrill congratulated the film council for their efforts and for training over 250 projectionists.
- In 1956, the fourth international film festival was held in Yorkton was held on 22, 23 October and 24. The festival received entries from 616 exhibitor that represented 14 countries. There were 52 films shown from 12 countries. The countries competing were Sweden, India, United Kingdom, Denmark, Netherlands, New Zealand, United States, Germany, Ireland, France, South Africa, Australia, Russia and Canada. Productions were entered for the first time by Russia and Ireland. First Prize was awarded to the Canadian NFB film The Shepherd, 2nd Prize was awarded to Russia's On the Shores of Lake Issik-Kul, and 3rd Prize was awarded to Britain's Heart of England.
- In 1957, the Yorkton Film Council received a special award from the Association of Motion Picture Producers and Laboratories of Canada, "in recognition of this outstanding International Film Festival." The citation on the Certificate of Merit read: "The Yorkton Film Council in its International Film festival offers for public viewing a selection of films of high quality from many countries and recognizes and encourages high stand of film production. The special Award is given to the Yorkton Film Council in recognition of its outstanding International Film festival which demonstrates the contribution of the film council movement in Canada."
- In 1957, a fire led to changes in the way the film council operated. Avalon Studios, the film depot and equipment supplier, was one of several businesses affected by the fire and film council lost almost everything. The council appealed to the local community for donations and help, which flowed quickly and helped the council recover. The Yorkton Public Library took over the responsibilities of Avalon Studios, and became the new film depot, which further allowed the film council to focus on running the festival.
- In 1958, the fifth international film festival was held in Yorkton on 20, 21 October, and 22nd. Exhibitors in the festival were Sweden, India, United Kingdom, Denmark, Netherlands, Czechoslovakia, New Zealand, Germany, China, Cinematographers Association, Israel, Norway, Finland, South Africa, Australia, Russia, Dynamic Films (U.S.A.), University of Southern California, National Film Board of Canada, Crawley Films Ltd., Shell Oil of Canada Ltd. and Imperial Oil Co. Ltd. Adjudicators were Gordon Campbell, Regina – director of adult education division, department of education; Gordon Hawkins, Toronto – associate director of Canadian Association for Adult Education; and Mrs. Lawrence Cherry, Regina – with the Saskatchewan government motion picture division. The National Film Board's City of Gold won first choice, Israel's Israel-An Adventure won second choice, and Himalayan Tapestry, produced by Burma-Shell and entered by Shell Oil Co. won third choice.
- 1958 marked the 75th anniversary of the city of Yorkton.
- In 1958, the Golden Sheaf was awarded for 'Best Film' in all categories for the first time to the Czech film, Inspiration.
- In the 1960s, the advent of television reduced the popularity of the festival so much so that the council decided to delay 1966's festival until 1967 in order to provide more time to promote it.
- In 1969, the tenth international film festival was held in Yorkton.
- In 1969, the festival faced dire straits as the YFC disbanded and all but gave up on continuing the festival. Nettie Kryski, treasurer of the film council for over 20 years, refused to let the festival die sought out Yorkton Mayor Allan Bailey, and his wife Colleen, to aid in keeping the festival going.The festival found a new partner in the Saskatchewan Arts Board, and the festival organizers reached out to local businesses and community organizations to sponsor the event. The festival created a new board of directors who worked to ensure the festival's continued survival. This was spearheaded by a succession of volunteers and board members who oversaw and introduced changes that put the festival on secure footing, those people were: Colleen Bailey, Laurence Pearson, Elwyn Vermette, and Brian Woodward.
- In 1971, when the Venice Film Festival claimed to receive the first ever international film submission from the People's Republic of China the Yorkton organizers were quick to reach out to offer the international community to offer a correction that the Yorkton festival had hosted eight films from China for the 1958 festival and three other films in 1962 and 1964.
- In the 1979 festival, Barry Morse, star of TV series The Fugitive, presented the newly redesigned Best of Festival Golden Sheaf to multiple recipients. This was first, and only, time in festival history in which multiple films were considered Best of Festival.
- In 1983 the festival changed its name to Yorkton Short Film and Video Festival. Previous to this it had been known as Yorkton International Short Film and Video Festival and prior to 1981 it had been known as Yorkton International Film Festival.
- In 2013, on 4 November Ruth Shaw died at the age of 95. She was the last surviving original founder of the Yorkton Film Council in 1947. The festival established the Ruth Shaw (Best of Saskatchewan) award to recognize the best film made in the province on her 90th birthday.

== Awards ==
=== Certificates of Merit ===
Up to 1954, the audience participated in judging the films through ballot casting: rating films as excellent, good or fair. The winners were issued Certificates of Merit. In 1956, the audience approval was still registered by ballots; however, for the first time the films were adjudicated and rated by film experts and professionals. The first adjudicators were Professor. A J. Wrick, supervisor of adult education division at University of Saskatchewan; Gordon Campbel, director of adult education division at the department of education in Regina; and Frank Morriss, drama and film editor of the Winnipeg Free Press.

=== Golden Sheaf Awards ===
After the 1956 film festival, Frank Morris recommended to the council that the film festival adopt a grand prize. The award was designed to be representative of the community and was named the Golden Sheaf Award. The Winnipeg Brass company cast the original design. In 1958 the festival awarded the Golden Sheaf, for the first time, for 'best film of all classes' to the Czech film Inspiration.

The Golden Sheaf Award, for 'best film in all categories', was awarded in 1960 to the NFB film Universe. In the 1960s, the festival moved away from the heavy and expensive brass award and moved towards an engraved metal plaque and then to an acrylic standalone trophy.

In the 1970s, Saskatchewan Government Insurance sponsored a new design for the Golden Sheaf Award. The winning design, by Jerry Didur proved to be too complex and costly to mass-produce. As a result, the board asked Yorkton artist Jim Trinder to re-design a new Golden Sheaf Award that is still used to this day.

In 1993 at the 31st film festival, referred to at this time as the Yorkton Short Film & Video Festival, Terry Steyn's Something to Cry About won five awards. This film went on to be nominated in 1995 for four Gemini Awards.

In 1996, the Yorkton Short Film & Video Festival, hosted a four-day event and honoured the best in 13 categories with the Golden Sheaf Awards. Utshimassits: Place of the Boss a documentary directed by John Walker (NFB) and produced by Mike Mahoney won 'Best of the Festival' Award. At the next festival, 'The Fifty Years Celebration', an additional four categories for international entries will be added.

In 2002, the documentary Nuliajuk: Mother of the Sea Beasts won the Golden Sheaf 'multicultural' award at the Yorkton Short Film and Video Festival.

In 2013 the Golden Sheaf Awards were awarded in nineteen Main categories, three Craft awards, the Ruth Shaw (Best of Saskatchewan), Indigenous and Emerging Filmmaker Awards as well as the Founder's Award, awarded to a production depicting historical Canadian characters or events.

In 2019, "Finding Big Country", "El Toro", "Beauty", "Tomorrow" and "Fast Horse" all were award winners. Awards were handed out in 29 categories at the Yorkton Film Festival Golden Sheaf Awards Gala, including the 'Ruth Shaw (Best of Saskatchewan)' was awarded "Bridging Borders – Season 2" and 'Best of Festival', 'Indigenous' and 'Multicultural (under 30 minutes)' were awarded to "Fast Horse."

=== Golden Sheaf Awards gala ===
In the 1980 festival, the first Golden Sheaf Awards gala was introduced as part of another initiative by the Board of Directors to increase community participation in the festival. The gala included a traditional Ukrainian supper, celebrating Yorkton's Ukrainian heritage, the Golden Sheaf Awards presentation, a clip from winning films, and a dance to serve as a finale to the fun filled evening. The gala has become a staple of the festival, and has been hosted by personalities like Shelia Coles, Jeff Douglas, and Costa Maragos.

=== Golden Sheaf Award categories ===
==== Special awards ====
- Best of Festival
- Kathleen Shannon Award
- The Founders' Award

==== Main categories ====
- Animation
- Children's/Youth Productions
- Comedy
- Community Television Productions
- Digital Media
- Documentary Arts/Culture
- Documentary History & Biography
- Documentary POV (Point of View)
- Documentary Science/Nature/Technology
- Documentary Series
- Documentary Social/Political
- Drama
- Experimental
- Lifestyle
- Performing Arts & Entertainment
- Short Subject
- Student Productions

==== Accompanying categories ====
- Emerging Filmmaker Award
- Indigenous Award
- Multicultural
- Ruth Shaw (Best of Saskatchewan)

==== Craft awards ====
- Director
- Research
