= Toronto Film Critics Association Award for Best Documentary Film =

Canadian film award

The BMO Allan King Award for Best Documentary Film is an annual award given by the Toronto Film Critics Association to a film judged by the members of that body to be the year's best documentary film.

== Winners ==
=== 2000s ===
Year	Winner	Director(s)	Ref
2002	Bowling for Columbine	Michael Moore	
2002	Gambling, Gods and LSD	Peter Mettler	
2002	Standing in the Shadows of Motown	Paul Justman	
2003	Capturing the Friedmans	Andrew Jarecki	
2004	The Fog of War	Errol Morris	
2005	Grizzly Man	Werner Herzog	
2006	Manufactured Landscapes	Jennifer Baichwal	
2006	Deliver Us from Evil	Amy J. Berg	
2006	An Inconvenient Truth	Davis Guggenheim	
2007	No End in Sight	Charles Ferguson	
2007	Iraq in Fragments	James Longley	
2007	My Kid Could Paint That	Amir Bar-Lev	
2008	Man on Wire	James Marsh	
2008	Standard Operating Procedure	Errol Morris	
2008	Up the Yangtze	Yung Chang	
2009	The Cove	Louie Psihoyos	
2009	Anvil! The Story of Anvil	Sacha Gervasi	
2009	The Beaches of Agnès	Agnès Varda	

=== 2010s ===
Year	Winner	Director(s)	Ref
2010	Exit Through the Gift Shop	Banksy	
2010	Inside Job	Charles Ferguson	
2010	Marwencol	Jeff Malmberg	
2011	Nostalgia for the Light	Patricio Guzmán	
2011	Into the Abyss	Werner Herzog	
2011	Project Nim	James Marsh	
2012	Stories We Tell	Sarah Polley	
2012	The Queen of Versailles	Lauren Greenfield	
2012	Searching for Sugar Man	Malik Bendjelloul	
2013	The Act of Killing	Joshua Oppenheimer	
2013	Leviathan	Lucien Castaing-Taylor, Véréna Paravel	
2013	Tim's Vermeer	Teller	
2014	The Overnighters	Jesse Moss	
2014	Citizenfour	Laura Poitras	
2014	Manakamana	Stephanie Spray, Pacho Velez	
2015	The Look of Silence	Joshua Oppenheimer	
2015	Amy	Asif Kapadia	
2015	Listen to Me Marlon	Stevan Riley	
2016	Cameraperson	Kirsten Johnson	
2016	Fire at Sea	Gianfranco Rosi	
2016	The Stairs	Hugh Gibson	
2017	Faces Places	Agnès Varda, JR	
2017	Jane	Brett Morgen	
2017	Kedi	Ceyda Torun	
2018	Won't You Be My Neighbor?	Morgan Neville	
2018	Anthropocene: The Human Epoch	Jennifer Baichwal, Nicholas de Pencier, Edward Burtynsky	
2018	Free Solo	Elizabeth Chai Vasarhelyi, Jimmy Chin	
2019	American Factory	Steven Bognar, Julia Reichert	
2019	Apollo 11	Todd Douglas Miller	
2019	The Cave	Feras Fayyad	

=== 2020s ===
Year	Winner	Director(s)	Ref
2020	Collective	Alexander Nanau	
2020	American Utopia	Spike Lee	
2020	Crip Camp	Nicole Newnham, James LeBrecht	
2020	Time	Garrett Bradley	
2021	Summer of Soul	Ahmir "Questlove" Thompson	
2021	Flee	Jonas Poher Rasmussen	
2021	The Velvet Underground	Todd Haynes	
2022	All the Beauty and the Bloodshed	Laura Poitras	
2022	Fire of Love	Sara Dosa	
2022	Moonage Daydream	Brett Morgen	
2023	20 Days in Mariupol	Mstyslav Chernov	
2023	The Eternal Memory	Maite Alberdi	
2023	Four Daughters	Kaouther Ben Hania	
2023	Swan Song	Chelsea McMullan	
2024	Dahomey	Mati Diop	
2024	Occupied City	Steve McQueen	
2024	Soundtrack to a Coup d'Etat	Johan Grimonprez	
2025	Come See Me in the Good Light	Ryan White	
2025	Orwell: 2+2=5	Raoul Peck	
2025	The Tale of Silyan	Tamara Kotevska	
