= Rogers Best Canadian Film Award =

Toronto Film Critics Association film award

The Rogers Best Canadian Film Award is presented annually by the Toronto Film Critics Association to the film judged by the organization's members as the year's best Canadian film. In 2012, the cash prize accompanying the award was increased to $100,000, making it the largest arts award in Canada. Each year, two runners-up also receive $5,000. The award is funded and presented by Rogers Communications, which is a founding sponsor of the association's awards gala.

In 2023, the TFCA announced changes to the award. Instead of a single $100,000 prize presented to a mixed shortlist of narrative and documentary films, the organization will now present two $50,000 prizes, one for narrative features and one for documentaries.

Unlike the other Toronto Film Critics Association awards, whose winners are announced in mid-December each year, the Best Canadian Film award only has its finalists announced at that time, and the winner of the award is then announced at the organization's gala in March.

== Toronto Film Critics Poll ==
Prior to the official launch of the Toronto Film Critics Association in 1997, film critic Wyndham Wise coordinated two polls of Torontonian film critics in 1995 and 1996 through his magazine Take One to select the year's best Canadian films; upon the launch of the TFCA, this poll was discontinued and superseded by the TFCA's annual awards.

=== 1995 ===
Category	Winners and nominees	Ref
Best Film	Rude — Damon D'Oliveira, Karen King	
Best Film	Double Happiness — Steve Hegyes, Rose Lam Waddell	
Best Film	When Night Is Falling — Barbara Tranter	
Best Film	Louis 19, King of the Airwaves (Louis 19, le roi des ondes) — Richard Sadler, Jacques Dorfmann	
Best Director	Clement Virgo, Rude	
Best Director	Mina Shum, Double Happiness	
Best Director	Charles Binamé, Eldorado	
Best Director	Patricia Rozema, When Night Is Falling	
Best Actor	Maury Chaykin, Whale Music	
Best Actor	Clark Johnson, Rude	
Best Actor	Maurice Dean Wint, Rude	
Best Actor	Peter Williams, Soul Survivor	
Best Actress	Sandra Oh, Double Happiness	
Best Actress	Pascale Montpetit, Eldorado	
Best Actress	Pascale Bussières, Eldorado	
Best Actress	Tracy Wright, Wasaga	
Best Screenplay	Mina Shum, Double Happiness	
Best Screenplay	Clement Virgo, Rude	
Best Screenplay	Émile Gaudreault, Sylvie Bouchard and Michel Michaud, Louis 19, King of the Airwaves (Louis 19, le roi des ondes)	
Best Screenplay	Bruce McDonald, Don McKellar and John Frizzell, Dance Me Outside	

=== 1996 ===
Category	Winners and nominees	Ref
Best Film	Hard Core Logo	
Best Film	Crash	
Best Film	Long Day's Journey into Night	
Best Film	The Confessional (Le Confessionnal)	
Best Film	Margaret's Museum	
Best Film	Curtis's Charm	
Best Film	Lilies	
Best Film	Once in a Blue Moon	
Best Film	The Suburbanators	
Best Film	Screamers	
Best Director	Robert Lepage, The Confessional (Le Confessionnal)	
Best Director	Bruce McDonald, Hard Core Logo	
Best Director	David Cronenberg, Crash	
Best Director	David Wellington, Long Day's Journey into Night	
Best Director	Mort Ransen, Margaret's Museum	
Best Director	John L'Ecuyer, Curtis's Charm	
Best Director	John Greyson, Lilies	
Best Director	Gary Burns, The Suburbanators	
Best Director	Christian Duguay, Screamers	
Best Director	Peter Mettler, Picture of Light	
Best Actor	William Hutt, Long Day's Journey into Night	
Best Actor	Callum Keith Rennie, Hard Core Logo	
Best Actor	Hugh Dillon, Hard Core Logo	
Best Actor	Lothaire Bluteau, The Confessional (Le Confessionnal)	
Best Actor	Maurice Dean Wint, Curtis's Charm	
Best Actor	Tom McCamus, Long Day's Journey into Night	
Best Actor	Brent Carver, Lilies	
Best Actor	Elias Koteas, Crash	
Best Actor	James Spader, Crash	
Best Actor	Clive Russell, Margaret's Museum	
Best Actress	Martha Henry, Long Day's Journey into Night	
Best Actress	Helena Bonham Carter, Margaret's Museum	
Best Actress	Kate Nelligan, Margaret's Museum	
Best Actress	Martha Burns, Long Day's Journey into Night	
Best Actress	Deborah Kara Unger, Crash	
Best Actress	Mary Beth Rubens, The Michelle Apartments	
Best Actress	Deanna Milligan, Once in a Blue Moon	
Best Actress	Tushka Bergen, Turning April	
Best Actress	Kristin Scott Thomas, The Confessional (Le Confessionnal)	
Best Actress	Holly Hunter, Crash	
Best Screenplay	Noel S. Baker, Hard Core Logo	
Best Screenplay	Robert Lepage, The Confessional (Le Confessionnal)	
Best Screenplay	Gerald Wexler, Mort Ransen, Margaret's Museum	
Best Screenplay	Eugene O'Neill, Long Day's Journey into Night	
Best Screenplay	David Cronenberg, Crash	
Best Screenplay	John L'Ecuyer, Curtis's Charm	
Best Screenplay	Michel Marc Bouchard, Lilies	
Best Screenplay	Gary Burns, The Suburbanators	
Best Screenplay	Laurie Lynd and Daniel MacIvor, House	
Best Screenplay	Dan O'Bannon and Miguel Tejada-Flores, Screamers	
Best Documentary	Picture of Light — Peter Mettler	
Best Documentary	Project Grizzly — Peter Lynch	
Best Documentary	Baseball Girls — Lois Siegel	
Best Documentary	Power — Magnus Isacsson	

== Toronto Film Critics Association ==
=== 1990s ===
Year	Film	Director(s)	Ref
1997	The Sweet Hereafter	Atom Egoyan	
1997	The Hanging Garden	Thom Fitzgerald	
1998	Last Night	Don McKellar	
1998	Nô	Robert Lepage	
1998	The Red Violin	François Girard	
1999	Set Me Free	Léa Pool	
1999	Felicia's Journey	Atom Egoyan	

=== 2000s ===
Year	Film	Director(s)	Ref
2000	waydowntown	Gary Burns	
2000	Maelström	Denis Villeneuve	
2001	Last Wedding	Bruce Sweeney	
2001	Ginger Snaps	John Fawcett	
2001	The Uncles	James Allodi	
2002	Atanarjuat: The Fast Runner	Zacharias Kunuk	
2002	FUBAR	Michael Dowse	
2002	Soft Shell Man (Un crabe dans la tête)	André Turpin	
2003	Spider	David Cronenberg	
2004	The Triplets of Belleville	Sylvain Chomet	
2005	A History of Violence	David Cronenberg	
2006	Manufactured Landscapes	Jennifer Baichwal	
2006	The Journals of Knud Rasmussen	Zacharias Kunuk	
2006	Monkey Warfare	Reginald Harkema	
2006	Six Figures	David Christensen	
2007	Away from Her	Sarah Polley	
2007	Eastern Promises	David Cronenberg	
2007	Radiant City	Gary Burns, Jim Brown	
2008	My Winnipeg	Guy Maddin	
2008	Continental, a Film Without Guns (Continental, un film sans fusil)	Stéphane Lafleur	
2008	Up the Yangtze	Yung Chang	
2009	Polytechnique	Denis Villeneuve	
2009	The Necessities of Life (Ce qu'il faut pour vivre)	Benoît Pilon	
2009	Pontypool	Bruce McDonald	

=== 2010s ===
Year	Film	Director(s)	Ref
2010	Incendies	Denis Villeneuve	
2010	Splice	Vincenzo Natali	
2010	Trigger	Bruce McDonald	
2011	Monsieur Lazhar	Philippe Falardeau	
2011	Café de Flore	Jean-Marc Vallée	
2011	A Dangerous Method	David Cronenberg	
2012	Stories We Tell	Sarah Polley	
2012	Bestiaire	Denis Côté	
2012	Goon	Michael Dowse	
2013	Watermark	Jennifer Baichwal, Edward Burtynsky	
2013	The Dirties	Matt Johnson	
2013	Gabrielle	Louise Archambault	
2014	Enemy	Denis Villeneuve	
2014	The F Word	Michael Dowse	
2014	Mommy	Xavier Dolan	
2015	The Forbidden Room	Guy Maddin, Evan Johnson	
2015	My Internship in Canada (Guibord s'en va-t-en guerre)	Philippe Falardeau	
2015	Sleeping Giant	Andrew Cividino	
2016	The Stairs	Hugh Gibson	
2016	How Heavy This Hammer	Kazik Radwanski	
2016	Operation Avalanche	Matt Johnson	
2017	Werewolf	Ashley McKenzie	
2017	Hello Destroyer	Kevan Funk	
2017	Wexford Plaza	Joyce Wong	
2018	Anthropocene: The Human Epoch	Jennifer Baichwal, Nicholas de Pencier, Edward Burtynsky	
2018	Ava	Sadaf Foroughi	
2018	Maison du Bonheur	Sofia Bohdanowicz	
2019	The Body Remembers When the World Broke Open	Kathleen Hepburn, Elle-Máijá Tailfeathers	
2019	Antigone	Sophie Deraspe	
2019	Firecrackers	Jasmin Mozaffari	

=== 2020s ===
Year	Film	Director(s)	Ref
2020	Anne at 13,000 Ft.	Kazik Radwanski	
2020	And the Birds Rained Down	Louise Archambault	
2020	White Lie	Yonah Lewis, Calvin Thomas	
2021	Beans	Tracey Deer	
2021	Night Raiders	Danis Goulet	
2021	Scarborough	Shasha Nakhai, Rich Williamson	
2022	Riceboy Sleeps	Anthony Shim	
2022	Brother	Clement Virgo	
2022	Crimes of the Future	David Cronenberg	
2023	BlackBerry	Matt Johnson	
2023	Humanist Vampire Seeking Consenting Suicidal Person (Vampire humaniste cherche suicidaire consentant)	Ariane Louis-Seize	
2023	Solo	Sophie Dupuis	
2024	Universal Language	Matthew Rankin	
2024	Rumours	Guy Maddin	
2024	Shepherds	Sophie Deraspe	
2025	Blue Heron	Sophy Romvari	
2025	Nirvanna the Band the Show the Movie	Matt Johnson	
2025	The Shrouds	David Cronenberg	

== Best Canadian Documentary ==
Year	Film	Director(s)	Ref
2023	Swan Song	Chelsea McMullan	
2023	Rojek	Zaynê Akyol	
2023	Someone Lives Here	Zack Russell	
2024	Any Other Way: The Jackie Shane Story	Michael Mabbott, Lucah Rosenberg-Lee	
2024	Yintah	Jennifer Wickham, Brenda Michell, Michael Toledano	
2024	Your Tomorrow	Ali Weinstein	
2025	Endless Cookie	Seth Scriver, Peter Scriver	
2025	Ghosts of the Sea (Les enfants du large)	Virginia Tangvald	
2025	Who Killed the Montreal Expos? (Qui a tué les Expos de Montréal?)	Jean-François Poisson	
