= Toronto Film Critics Association =

Canadian film critics association

- Abbreviation: TFCA
- Formation: 1997
- Location: Toronto, Ontario, Canada
- Members: 30
- Official language: English
- President: Pat Mullen
- Main organ: Vice-president: Dave Voigt; Treasurer: Rachel West
- Affiliations: FIPRESCI
- Website: torontofilmcritics.com

The Toronto Film Critics Association (TFCA) is an organization of film critics from Toronto-based publications. As of 1999, the TFCA is a member of the FIPRESCI.

== History ==
The Toronto Film Critics Association is the official organization of Toronto-based broadcasters and journalists who critique films and provide commentary on them.

The TFCA began presenting awards in 1998, and the dinner around them is an annual event in the Canadian film calendar.

The founding members of the TFCA—those who attended the first meeting in August 1997 at the board room of the National Film Board of Canada—were Cameron Bailey (Now Magazine), Norm Wilner (freelance), Liam Lacey (The Globe and Mail), Peter Howell (Toronto Star), Brian D. Johnson (Maclean's), Angie Baldarrasse (freelance), Marc Glassman (Take One), Gemma Files (Eye Weekly), and Wyndham Wise (Take One). Prior to the official launch of the organization, two informal Toronto film critics' polls appeared in Take One, in issues #10 (Winter 1996) and #14 (Winter 1997), organized by Wise.

== Members ==
Current members of the TFCA:

- Prabhjot Bains - RANGE Magazine, NEXT Magazine
- Liz Braun – Toronto Sun, Original Cin
- Susan G. Cole – Freelance
- Thom Ernst – Freelance
- Marriska Fernandes – Freelance
- Daniel Garber - CIUT 89.5 FM
- Eli Glasner – CBC
- Marc Glassman - CFMZ-FM, Ludwig Van
- Sarah Gopaul - Freelance
- Jason Gorber – Collider, CBC Metro Morning
- Karen Gordon – Original Cin
- Peter Howell – Toronto Star
- Kim Hughes - Original Cin
- Brian D. Johnson, Zoomer
- Chris Knight – National Post, Original Cin
- Liam Lacey - Original Cin
- Joe Lipsett - Bloody Disgusting, Horror Queers (podcast)
- Pat Mullen - POV Magazine
- Steve Norton - ScreenFish
- Jennie Punter – Variety
- Johanna Schneller – The Globe and Mail
- Gilbert Seah – Afro Toronto, Toronto Franco
- Alice Shih – Fairchild Radio
- Jim Slotek – Original Cin
- Victor Stiff - Freelance
- Glenn Sumi – Freelance
- Kate Taylor – The Globe and Mail
- Dave Voigt - In the Seats
- Jackson Weaver – CBC
- Rachel West – That Shelf, Alliance of Women Film Journalists

Emeritus members of the TFCA:

- Jason Anderson
- Linda Barnard
- Anne Brodie
- Bruce Kirkland

Source: TFCA

== Categories ==
=== Current categories ===
- Best Film
- Outstanding Lead Performance
- Outstanding Supporting Performance
- Outstanding Breakthrough Performance
- Outstanding Lead Performance in a Canadian Film
- Outstanding Supporting Performance in a Canadian Film
- Best Director
- Best Animated Film
- Best Documentary Film
- Best First Feature
- Best Foreign Language Film
- Best Screenplay
- Rogers Best Canadian Film Award
- Rogers Best Canadian Documentary Award
- Jay Scott Prize
- Company 3 TFCA Luminary Award

=== Discontinued categories ===
- Best Actor
- Best Actress
- Best Supporting Actor
- Best Supporting Actress

== Ceremonies ==
- 1997 – 1st
- 1998 – 2nd
- 1999 – 3rd
- 2000 – 4th
- 2001 – 5th
- 2002 – 6th
- 2003 – 7th
- 2004 – 8th
- 2005 – 9th
- 2006 – 10th
- 2007 – 11th
- 2008 – 12th
- 2009 – 13th
- 2010 – 14th
- 2011 – 15th
- 2012 – 16th
- 2013 – 17th
- 2014 – 18th
- 2015 – 19th
- 2016 – 20th
- 2017 – 21st
- 2018 – 22nd
- 2019 – 23rd
- 2020 – 24th
- 2021 – 25th
- 2022 – 26th
- 2023 – 27th
- 2024 – 28th
- 2025 – 29th
