= David Schmidt (editor) =

Canadian film editor

David Schmidt is a Canadian film editor. He is most noted for his work on the 2024 documentary film Wilfred Buck, for which he won the Canadian Screen Award for Best Editing in a Documentary at the 13th Canadian Screen Awards in 2025.

His other credits have included the film Eternal Spring and the documentary web series Canadiana, as well as assistant editing credits on Watermark, Black Code, Long Time Running, Anthropocene: The Human Epoch and Into the Weeds.
