= Act of God (film) =

2009 Canadian documentary about lightning strikes directed by Jennifer Baichwal

- Theatrical release poster
- Directed by: Jennifer Baichwal
- Written by: Paul Auster
- Produced by: Jennifer Baichwal; Nicholas de Pencier; Daniel Iron; Issa Zaroui
- Starring: Paul Auster
- Cinematography: Nicholas de Pencier
- Edited by: Roland Schlimme
- Music by: Fred Frith; Martin Tielli; Dave Bidini; Selina Martin
- Distributed by: Zeitgeist Films
- Release date: 1 May 2009
- Running time: 76 minutes
- Country: Canada
- Language: English

Act of God is a 2009 Canadian documentary film that investigates the "metaphysical" effects of being struck by lightning. It was directed by Jennifer Baichwal (Manufactured Landscapes) and distributed by Zeitgeist Films. The film's world premier was at the 2009 Hot Docs Canadian International Documentary Festival at the Royal Ontario Museum in Toronto on 30 April 2009. It went on general release in Canada on 1 May 2009, and limited release in the United States on 31 July 2009. The film's European premiere was at the 44th Karlovy Vary International Film Festival in the Czech Republic on 11 July 2009.

== Overview ==
In Act of God director Jennifer Baichwal questions whether being struck by lightning is a "random natural occurrence or a predestined event". The film contains seven stories in which Baichwal interviews people about their personal experiences with lightning strikes. She speaks to American novelist and screenwriter Paul Auster, Canadian dramatist James O'Reilly, and US Marine veteran and author Dannion Brinkley. She also interviews a storm chaser in France, and a group of Mexican mothers who accept the loss of their children to lightning at a religious festival as "God's will". She also investigates a Yoruba religious community in Rwanda (the lightning capital of the world) who worship the lightning god Shango. The reactions in each of Baichwal's subjects varies considerably, from an "act of God" to the "mechanics of reality".

Auster, the "philosophical anchor of the film", relates how he saw his friend being struck by lightning a short distance from him at a summer camp. Auster, 14 years old at the time, survived the incident while his friend died. Auster said "It opened up a whole realm of speculation that I've continued to live with ever since." Yet in spite of the deep effect this event had on him, Auster insists in the film that it was "nothing more than a random occurrence".

O'Reilly wrote a play called Act of God which was based on his experience with lightning in South River, Ontario in 1979. In the film O'Reilly says "I can't accept that it happened for a reason, nor can I really accept that there is no reason. The only way to carry on is to be humble, and a little bit in awe of these things you can't really understand." Brinkley was also struck by lightning and described it as "dying for 28 minutes and going up to heaven and having a completely life-transforming experience."

Also present in the film is English experimental and improvisational guitarist Fred Frith. Frith loosely ties up the stories by demonstrating that "we are electrical beings, our brains work electrically". In the laboratory of his brother, neuroscientist Chris Frith, Frith improvises music on his guitar while electrical impulses in his head are recorded with a brain scan, showing that "our very thoughts are akin to tiny lightning strikes in the cerebral cortex." Baichwal described improvisation as "the state of being between meaning and chance" and "it was the perfect metaphor for being struck by lightning".

Frith provides the music for his segment of the film, while the score for the rest of the film comes from musicians Martin Tielli, Dave Bidini and Selina Martin.

== Background ==
Jennifer Baichwal was born in Montreal where she studied for her master's degree in philosophy and theology at McGill University. Her debut feature-length film was Let It Come Down: The Life of Paul Bowles in 1998, which won her Best Biography at the 1999 Hot Docs Canadian International Documentary Festival, and the 1999 International Emmy for Best Arts Documentary. Baichwal is best known for her 2006 multiple award-winning documentary, Manufactured Landscapes, which was about the Canadian artist Edward Burtynsky.

Many of Baichwal's films are about artists and the creative process, but she has also explored philosophical and spiritual themes, for example in her award-winning documentary The Holier It Gets, which records her journey to the source of the Ganges River in India. Act of God looks at both the artistic and "metaphysical" side of life.

Instead of using the "traditional scientific approach", Baichwal tackled the issue lightning strikes from a "philosophical point of view". She said "Our main challenge was figuring out how to make a film about something that's totally ephemeral. I love unanswerable questions; questions like 'Is there such a thing as destiny', and 'what does it all mean?'" While research is done into the role of electricity in our brains, Baichwal wanted to find out the effect of electricity on the mind. She said that "Lightning is always cast in a scientific light [in film], unless it's used as a joke. We wanted stories that embodied that tension between meaning and chance."

The idea of making Act of God came to Baichwal before she started working on her previous film, Manufactured Landscapes. It was during that film's development and her travels around the world to attend its screenings at film festivals that she started doing research and conducting interviews for Act of God. But the final inspiration to begin work on the film came from her partner Nicholas de Pencier, "a weather nerd", and the writings of lightning survivor, Paul Auster.

Act of God took three years to make, which included several years of research and collecting stories from around the world of people "whose lives [were] changed by lightning". De Pencier was the film's cinematographer and co-producer.

== Critical reception ==
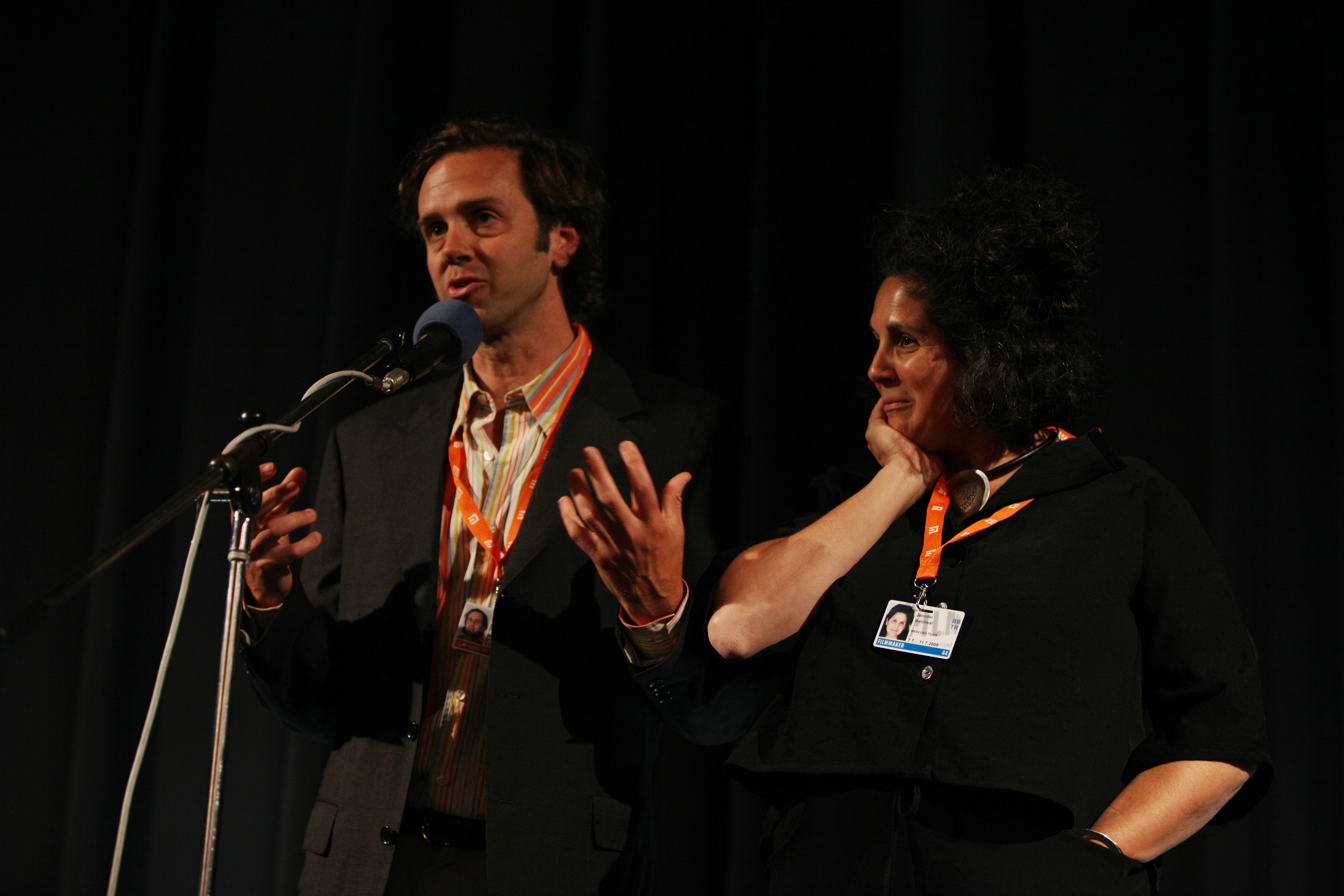
Producer Nick de Pencier and director Jennifer Baichwal introducing Act of God at the 44th KVIFF.

Act of God was selected as the Opening Night Gala feature at the 2009 Hot Docs Canadian International Documentary Festival, the largest documentary film festival in North America.

Chris Jancelewicz of AOL Canada Entertainment said the footage taken by Jennifer Baichwal's partner, Nick de Pencier is "nothing short of remarkable". "One of the amazing things about Act of God is Baichwal's ability to resist this urge to dictate what lightning, and ultimately chance, fate, and destiny mean in the bigger picture." Jancelewicz said that throughout the film Baichwal never imposes her views, and never comes to any conclusion, simply because "there is no conclusion to be found".

Susan Noakes of CBC News described the film as an "enigmatic meditation on being struck by lightning". Jessica Werb at The Georgia Straight said the film was "one hell of a thesis". She added that while "most of us live [...] somewhere 'in the continuum of meaning and randomness'", the lives of those appearing in the film, "in one terrifying instant, swung to one extreme or the other".

Norman Wilner of NOW gave the film 4 'N's out of 5, and Nathan Southern at Allmovie gave the film 2.5 stars out of 5.
