= Payback (2012 film) =

- Directed by: Jennifer Baichwal
- Written by: Jennifer Baichwal; Margaret Atwood (original book, Payback: Debt and the Shadow Side of Wealth
- Produced by: Ravida Din
- Cinematography: Nicholas de Pencier
- Edited by: Nick Hector
- Music by: Martin Tielli
- Production company: National Film Board of Canada
- Distributed by: Zeitgeist Films; Mongrel Media (Canada)
- Release date: January 20, 2012 (Sundance)
- Running time: 86 minutes
- Country: Canada
- Languages: English; Spanish; Albanian

Payback is a 2012 documentary film from Jennifer Baichwal based on Margaret Atwood's Payback: Debt and the Shadow Side of Wealth, which investigates the concept of debt in societies across the world (and not only on a monetary level).

As a Canadian, Baichwal was quite familiar with Atwood's reputation:

Her books are almost required reading if you grow up in Canada. I was almost nervous about meeting her because she’s so intelligent and articulate, but she puts you so much at ease. As intelligent as she is, she never makes you feel that you’re not on her level. As Mark Twain said, “Really great people make you feel that you, too, can become great.”

A number of prominent intellectuals provide commentary, including economist and writer Raj Patel, ecologist William E. Rees, historian of religions Karen Armstrong, and former UN High Commissioner for Human Rights Louise Arbour.

The film was produced by Ravida Din for the National Film Board of Canada. It premiered at the 2012 Sundance Film Festival. Payback is distributed by Zeitgeist Films, which also distributed Baichwal's previous works Act of God and Manufactured Landscapes. The film is being distributed in Canada by Mongrel Media, beginning March 2012.

== See also ==
- Margaret Atwood: Once in August, a 1984 National Film Board documentary about Atwood.
