= Roland Schlimme =

Canadian film editor

Roland Schlimme is a Canadian film editor known in particular for his work with filmmakers Peter Mettler and Jennifer Baichwal. He's also worked on several projects with artists Phillip Barker and Laura Taler as well as filmmakers Alison Murray and Cliff Caines.

== Career ==
Roland Schlimme began his film editing career working with Peter Mettler in an abandoned hotel outside Zurich on the feature documentary Gambling, Gods and LSD, tackling hundreds of hours of film and video to produce a fifty-two-hour assembly edit and a three-hour film. Of this period, Mettler would later remark, “I’ve never lived together with anybody as intensively as Roland. … He edited the day shift and I’d edit the night shift and we’d converse and show each other things in-between.”

Speaking of his contributions to Anthropocene: The Human Epoch, director Jennifer Baichwal said, “The quarry scene was interesting because it was Roland’s idea, our editor, to use the opera [Mozart’s Don Giovanni]. At first, I thought, ‘it’s drawing too much attention to itself,’ but then I grew to love it because there is something so epic about that environment.” (The segment sets activity at the cavernous Carrara marble quarries in Italy to the second act of the opera, in which a statue takes its revenge on an unrepentant Don Giovanni.)

Schlimme works predominantly but not exclusively on documentary films and describes his approach to film editing with analogies to writing and music composition, stressing the importance of early-stage assemblies. In an interview published in 2012, he elaborated, “Assembly is a crucial stage because it's an exploration of the material, a time to experiment a bit, but importantly a way of evaluating the strengths and weaknesses of the material, what it might offer the film. The discussion about structure is based on the assemblies. … I work on a lot of unscripted material. This is the model of filmmaking wherein the activity in the editing room becomes something like the writing process, except that it's a process of juggling images, sounds, motions, words, music, etc. … it's important with these types of films to have the time to make it work.”

Schlimme's film credits also include writing and music composition (Trouble in the Peace, Watermark, Manufactured Landscapes, and others). In addition to music for films, Schlimme produces music as Rewaver (along with Joseph Doane).

Schlimme mentors and lectures occasionally (including masterclasses at the Documentary Media MFA program at Toronto Metropolitan University) and in 2012 he inaugurated the “Creative Editing and Sound” undergraduate course at Toronto Metropolitan University.

== Accolades ==
The films Schlimme has edited have been featured at TIFF nine times (including a Gala, a Special Presentation, and the Master's Programme) and at Hot Docs eight times (including an Opening Night Gala). Among many international accolades, they've won two Canadian Screen Awards for Best Feature Documentary (Anthropocene: The Human Epoch in 2019; Watermark in 2014), two Genies for Best Documentary (Manufactured Landscapes in 2006; Gambling, Gods and LSD in 2002), a Genie for Best Arts Documentary (National Parks Project in 2011), and an International Emmy for Outstanding Documentary (Let It Come Down: The Life of Paul Bowles in 1999).

Schlimme was the winner (along with editor Caroline Christie) of the Directors Guild of Canada's DGC Craft Award for Picture Editing in a Documentary in 2020 for Meat the Future. He was a Canadian Screen Award nominee (Best Editing in a Documentary) for Long Time Running in 2018 and a Gemini Award nominee (Best Picture Editing in a Documentary Program or Series) for Acquainted with the Night in 2011. He is also a two-time nominee for the Canadian Cinema Editors awards for Acquainted with the Night in 2011 and for The Ghosts in Our Machine in 2014 (both times along with editor Roderick Deogrades).

== Filmography ==
=== Documentary ===
- Let It Come Down: The Life of Paul Bowles - 1998 (as Associate Editor with David Wharnsby, Editor)
- Gambling, Gods and LSD - 2002
- Perpetual Motion - 2002
- The World at 10 - 2004
- The Tunguska Project - 2005
- Manufactured Landscapes - 2006
- Carny - 2008
- Doormat - 2008
- Petropolis: Aerial Perspectives on the Alberta Tar Sands - 2009
- Act of God - 2009
- Acquainted with the Night - 2010
- My Joan of Arc - 2011
- Caprichiosos de San Telmo (Murga) - 2011
- Embracing Voices: The Woman Behind the Music of Jane Bunnett - 2012
- Watermark - 2012
- The End of Time - 2012
- Trouble in the Peace - 2013
- The Ghosts in Our Machine - 2013
- A Rock and a Hard Place - 2015
- Shadows of Paradise - 2016
- Long Time Running - 2017
- Anthropocene: The Human Epoch - 2018
- Coral Ghosts - 2019
- Workhorse - 2019
- Meat the Future - 2020
- Into the Weeds - 2022
- Russians at War - 2024

=== Feature films ===
- Love Is Work - 2005
- Population Zero - 2016

=== Short films ===
- The Wet Season - 2002
- Forsaken - 2005
- Unpublished - 2005
- On Fire - 2006
- The Art of Seduction - 2006
- The Sorcerer - 2007
- Night Vision - 2008
- Solace - 2008
- Love Song - 2008
- The Patient - 2009
- Slow Blink - 2010
- National Parks Project (Mingin) - 2011
- Hardcore - 2011
- Malody - 2012
- Shadow Nettes - 2017
- Torn Again - 2021
- The Distance Between Us - 2021
