= Wilfred Buck (film) =

2024 Canadian documentary film

- Opening titles
- Directed by: Lisa Jackson
- Written by: Lisa Jackson
- Produced by: Laura Grant; Lisa Jackson; Alicia Smith
- Starring: Wilfred Buck; Raymond Chartrand; Brandon Alexis
- Cinematography: Justin Black
- Edited by: David Schmidt; Matt Lyon
- Production company: National Film Board of Canada
- Release date: March 18, 2024 (CPH:DOX)
- Running time: 97 minutes
- Country: Canada
- Language: English

Wilfred Buck is a 2024 Canadian documentary film, directed by Lisa Jackson. The film is a portrait of Wilfred Buck, a Cree man from Manitoba who survived a troubled and impoverished upbringing to become a celebrated keeper and teacher of traditional First Nations approaches to astronomy.

The film is partially based on Buck's own 2021 memoir I Have Lived Four Lives.

The film premiered in March 2024 at the CPH:DOX festival in Denmark, and had its Canadian premiere at the 2024 Hot Docs Canadian International Documentary Festival.

== Wilfred Buck's Star Stories ==
Wilfred Buck's Star Stories, a virtual reality sister project illustrating Buck's Cree cosmology for exhibition in domes and planetariums, premiered at the 75th Berlin International Film Festival.

The virtual reality exhibition was released in English, French and Cree language versions, as well as a version with only music and sound effects for Buck to narrate live.

== Awards ==
Award	Date of ceremony	Category	Recipient(s)	Result	Ref.
DOXA Documentary Film Festival	2024	Colin Low Award	Lisa Jackson	Honored	
Montreal International Documentary Festival	2024	Women Inmate Jury Award	Lisa Jackson	Won	
Canadian Screen Awards	June 1, 2025	Best Feature Length Documentary	Lisa Jackson, Lauren Grant, Alicia Smith, Jennifer Baichwal, Nicholas de Pencier, David Christensen	Nominated	
Canadian Screen Awards	June 1, 2025	Best Editing in a Documentary	David Schmidt	Won	
Canadian Screen Awards	June 1, 2025	Best Sound Design in a Documentary	David Rose	Nominated	
imagineNATIVE Film and Media Arts Festival	2025	Best Digital and Interactive Production	Lisa Jackson, The Macronauts; Wilfred Buck's Star Stories	Won	

== See also ==
- Indigenous astronomy in lands claimed by Canada
