= Toronto Film Critics Association Awards 2022 =

Annual Canadian film awards ceremony

26th Toronto Film Critics Association
- Date: March 6, 2023
- Site: The Omni King Edward Hotel, Toronto
- Hosted by: Amanda Brugel

Highlights
- Best Picture: Aftersun
- Most awards: Aftersun (4)

The 26th Toronto Film Critics Association Awards, honouring the best films released in 2022, were announced on January 8, 2023.

Aftersun received the most awards with four wins, including Best Picture. For the first time in three years, the members met in person at Metro Hall for a "live vote" to determine the winners. The ceremony was held at The Omni King Edward Hotel on March 6, 2023, where the winner for the Rogers Best Canadian Film Award was announced. Additional winners for the Stella Artois Jay Scott Prize for Best Emerging Artist, the Company 3 TFCA Luminary Award, and the Telefilm Canada Emerging Critic Award were announced on February 10.

Hosted by actress Amanda Brugel, the ceremony featured a cocktail party sponsored by Universal Pictures Canada, a dinner sponsored by Netflix, and an after-party sponsored by Prime Video. During the event, Brugel introduced video acceptance speeches from Charlotte Wells (Best Picture, Best Director, and Best First Feature winner for Aftersun), Paul Mescal (Best Actor winner for Aftersun), Ke Huy Quan (Best Supporting Actor winner for Everything Everywhere All at Once), Laura Poitras (Allan King Documentary Award winner for All the Beauty and the Bloodshed), and Domee Shi (Best Animated Feature winner for Turning Red).

The Rogers Best Canadian Film Award was presented to Riceboy Sleeps as the winner; the directors of the runners-up each received $5,000 from Rogers Communications. Comedian and TV personality Rick Mercer presented the $10,000 Stella Artois Jay Scott Prize for an emerging artist to filmmaker Carol Nguyen; Nguyen's short films, which are drawn from her life and Vietnamese-Canadian culture, have played at more than 80 film festivals. In its mission to recognize new voices in film criticism, the TFCA gave Michelle Krasovitski the fourth annual Telefilm Canada Emerging Critic Award, presented by actress Maitreyi Ramakrishnan. Krasovitski is a daughter of Soviet-era Ukrainian immigrants who taught her to appreciate a culture of uncensored film; the award comes with a prize of $1,000. Steve Gravestock was named as the recipient of this year's Company 3 TFCA Luminary Award; that award comes with a pay-it-forward grant of $50,000 in production services to a filmmaker of the recipient's choice. Gravestock chose producer/actor Hugh Gibson and writer/director Frieda Luk; TIFF CEO Cameron Bailey, and Company 3 VP and GM James Fraser presented the award to the recently retired Gravestock.

== Winners ==
Winners are listed first and in bold, followed by the runners-up.

Best Picture	Best Director
**Aftersun**; Everything Everywhere All at Once; Women Talking	**Charlotte Wells – Aftersun**; Daniel Kwan and Daniel Scheinert – Everything Everywhere All at Once; Sarah Polley – Women Talking
Best Actor	Best Actress
**Paul Mescal – Aftersun as Calum Paterson**; Colin Farrell – The Banshees of Inisherin as Pádraic Súilleabháin; Brendan Fraser – The Whale as Charlie	**Cate Blanchett – Tár as Lydia Tár**; Danielle Deadwyler – Till as Mamie Till-Mobley; Michelle Yeoh – Everything Everywhere All at Once as Evelyn Quan Wang
Best Supporting Actor	Best Supporting Actress
**Ke Huy Quan – Everything Everywhere All at Once as Waymond Wang**; Brendan Gleeson – The Banshees of Inisherin as Colm Doherty; Barry Keoghan – The Banshees of Inisherin as Dominic Kearney	**Keke Palmer – Nope as Emerald "Em" Haywood**; Jessie Buckley – Women Talking as Mariche; Stephanie Hsu – Everything Everywhere All at Once as Joy Wang / Jobu Tupaki
Best Screenplay (Original or Adapted)	Best Animated Feature
**Martin McDonagh – The Banshees of Inisherin**; Todd Field – Tár; Sarah Polley – Women Talking	**Turning Red**; Guillermo del Toro's Pinocchio; Marcel the Shell with Shoes On
Allan King Documentary Award	Best International Feature
**All the Beauty and the Bloodshed**; Fire of Love; Moonage Daydream	**Saint Omer**; Decision to Leave; EO
Rogers Best Canadian Film Award	Best First Feature
**Riceboy Sleeps – Anthony Shim**; Brother – Clement Virgo; Crimes of the Future – David Cronenberg	**Aftersun**; Marcel the Shell with Shoes On; Turning Red

== Special awards ==
- Company 3 Luminary Award – Steve Gravestock
- Telefilm Canada Emerging Critic Award – Michelle Krasovitski
- Stella Artois Jay Scott Prize for Best Emerging Artist – Carol Nguyen

== Special Citation ==
"To Iranian filmmakers Jafar Panahi, Mohammad Rasoulof and Mostafa Al-Ahmad, who are currently in jail in Iran yet continue to make subtle movies that talk about life in their country, in spite of threats and restrictions from the regime. We stand in solidarity with them and add our voices to the international arts community calling for their release."
