= Toronto Film Critics Association Awards 2021 =

Annual Canadian film awards ceremony

25th Toronto Film Critics Association Awards
- Date: March 7, 2022

Highlights
- Best Picture: Drive My Car

The 25th Toronto Film Critics Association Awards, honoring the best in film for 2021, were announced on January 16, 2022. Drive My Car and The Lost Daughter received the most awards with three wins each, with the former receiving the Best Picture award. The ceremony was held on March 7, 2022.

== Winners ==
The winners are listed first and in bold, followed by the runner-ups.

Best Film	Best Director
**Drive My Car**; Licorice Pizza; The Power of the Dog	**Jane Campion – The Power of the Dog**; Ryusuke Hamaguchi – Drive My Car; Denis Villeneuve – Dune
Best Actor	Best Actress
**Denzel Washington – The Tragedy of Macbeth as Lord Macbeth**; Benedict Cumberbatch – The Power of the Dog as Phil Burbank; Andrew Garfield – tick, tick... Boom! as Jonathan Larsen	**Olivia Colman – The Lost Daughter as Leda Caruso**; Penélope Cruz – Parallel Mothers as Janis Martinez; Kristen Stewart – Spencer as Diana, Princess of Wales
Best Supporting Actor	Best Supporting Actress
**Bradley Cooper – Licorice Pizza as Jon Peters**; Ciarán Hinds – Belfast as Pop; Kodi Smit-McPhee – The Power of the Dog as Peter Gordon	**Jessie Buckley – The Lost Daughter as young Leda Caruso**; Kirsten Dunst – The Power of the Dog as Rose Gordon; Ruth Negga – Passing as Clare Bellew
Best Screenplay	Best Animated Film
**Drive My Car – Ryusuke Hamaguchi and Takamasa Oe**; Licorice Pizza – Paul Thomas Anderson; The Power of the Dog – Jane Campion	**Flee**; Encanto; The Mitchells vs. the Machines
Best Documentary Film	Best Foreign Language Film
**Summer of Soul**; Flee; The Velvet Underground	**Drive My Car**; Petite Maman; The Worst Person in the World
Rogers Best Canadian Film Award	Best First Feature
**Beans – Tracey Deer**; Night Raiders – Danis Goulet; Scarborough – Shasha Nakhai and Rich Williamson	**The Lost Daughter**; Passing; Pig; Shiva Baby

== Special awards ==
- TFCA Emerging Critic Award – Rachel Ho
- Jay Scott Prize – Bretten Hannam
- Clyde Gilmour Award – David Cronenberg
  - "Pay it forward" - Kelly Fyffe-Marshall
