= David Wharnsby =

Canadian film editor

- Born: June 20, 1967 (age 58); Waterloo, Ontario, Canada
- Occupations: Film Editor; Director
- Years active: 1996 - present
- Spouse: Sarah Polley (m. 2003; div. 2008)

David Wharnsby (born June 20, 1967) is a Canadian film editor. He was married to director and actress Sarah Polley.

== Life and career ==
Wharnsby was born in Waterloo, Ontario. He attended Kitchener-Waterloo Collegiate and Vocational School.

Some of Wharnsby's numerous credits include; the CBC's miniseries Northern Town, directed by Gary Burns; At The Hotel, directed by Ken Finkleman; TIFF top ten films, I, Claudia, by Chris Abraham; The Uncles by James Allodi; Ken Finkleman's The Newsroom and Foreign Objects; I Shout Love by Sarah Polley; Atom Egoyan's Sarabande; The Four Seasons and Don Giovanni Unmasked by Barbara Willis Sweete; David Weaver's Siblings and Century Hotel; and Three Stories by Semi Chellas.

His television directing credits include one episode of Billable Hours ("Killer Comma"), two episodes of Being Erica ("This Be the Verse" and "The Unkindest Cut") and three episodes of Saving Hope.

Wharnsby received a Gemini Award for his work on Jennifer Baichwal's documentary The Holier It Gets. He has also worked with Baichwal on The True Meaning of Pictures, and the Let It Come Down: The Life of Paul Bowles. He won a Genie Award in 2004 for his work on Guy Maddin's The Saddest Music in the World. Wharnsby was also awarded the DGC Craft Award for Picture Editing of a Feature Film for Away from Her in 2007. Regardless of the myriad of awards he has been nominated for and/or received, he has rarely made any public appearances.

Wharnsby married Sarah Polley, who in addition to directing is an actress, singer, writer, and activist, in September 2003. They have since divorced. He collaborated with then wife Polley on the 2006 feature-length film Away from Her, which Polley directed. His mother Marnie was host of the children's television show Romper Room in the 1960s for CKCO-TV. His brother Tim is a sports reporter for the Canadian Broadcasting Corporation's website, cbcsports.ca. He also has two sisters.

== Filmography ==
Editor
Year	Title	Notes
1996	Project Grizzly	Documentary
1996	Drive	Short film
1997	Hong Kong Symphony	TV movie
1997	Bach Cello Suite #4: Sarabande	
1998	Let It Come Down: The Life of Paul Bowles	Documentary
1998	A Boy's Own Story	Short film
1999	Heater	
1999	In Memory	Short film
1999	Don't Think Twice	Short film
2000	Hindsight	Short film
2000	Prelude	Short film
2000	The Line	Short film
2000	24fps	Short film
2000	The Holier It Gets	
2000	The Uncles	
2001	Great Performances	Episode: "Don Giovanni Unmasked"
2001	Three Stories from the End of Everything	Short film
2001	Century Hotel	
2001	I Shout Love	Short film
2002	The True Meaning of Pictures: Shelby Lee Adams' Appalachia	Documentary
2002	Perfect Pie	
2002	Escape from the Newsroom	TV movie
2003	The Saddest Music in the World	
2004	The Newsroom	Episode: "America, America"
2004	Elizabeth Rex	TV movie
2004	Trouser Accidents	Short film
2004	I, Claudia	
2004	Siblings	
2006	At the Hotel	TV series
2006	Northern Town	TV series
2006	Away from Her	
2008	Passchendaele	
2008	Green Door	Short film
2022	Into the Weeds	

Director
Year	Title	Notes
2007	Billable Hours	Episode: "The Killer Comma"
2009	Being Erica	Episode 108: "This Be the Verse"; Episode 207: "The Unkindest Cut"
2012	Saving Hope	Episode 217: "Twinned Lambs"; Episode 308: "The Heartbreak Kid"
