= Steve Gravestock =

Steve Gravestock is a Canadian film festival programmer, best known as a programmer for the Toronto International Film Festival.

Formerly a freelance film critic for various Toronto magazines and newspapers, he first joined TIFF's programming staff in 1994. He became the head programmer for Canadian films in 2004, also retaining responsibility for programming Nordic and Scandinavian films. In this role, he also played a key role in organizing and conducting the festival's annual Canada's Top Ten poll to identify the best Canadian films of the year, and coordinated the festival's series of monographs on Canadian film history.

He is the author of the TIFF monograph Don Owen: Notes on the Filmmaker and His Culture and of a 2019 book on the history of Icelandic film.

He announced in 2022 that he would retire from TIFF at the end of the year, with the 2022 Toronto International Film Festival being the last edition to feature his programming selections. As his last major project with TIFF, he programmed Seen the North, a special screening series held at the TIFF Lightbox in January 2023 which highlighted some of his own personal favourite films that he had programmed during his career with the festival. He was succeeded as the festival's Canadian film programmer by Norman Wilner.

He won the Toronto Film Critics Association's Company 3 TFCA Luminary Award at the Toronto Film Critics Association Awards 2022, and selected Hugh Gibson and Frieda Luk as recipients of the "pay-it-forward" grant.
