= Anthropocene: The Human Epoch =

2018 Canadian film

- Film poster
- Directed by: Jennifer Baichwal; Nicholas de Pencier; Edward Burtynsky
- Narrated by: Alicia Vikander
- Cinematography: Nicholas de Pencier
- Edited by: Roland Schlimme
- Production companies: Mercury Films; Seville International
- Distributed by: Mongrel Media
- Release dates: September 13, 2018 (TIFF); September 28, 2018
- Running time: 87 minutes
- Country: Canada
- Language: English
- Box office: $753,488

Anthropocene: The Human Epoch is a 2018 Canadian documentary film made by Jennifer Baichwal, Nicholas de Pencier and Edward Burtynsky. It explores the emerging concept of a geological epoch called the Anthropocene, defined by the impact of humanity on natural development.

== Details ==
"Anthropocene: The Human Epoch" is the third film in a series of collaborations between filmmakers Jennifer Baichwal and Nicholas de Pencier with photographer Edward Burtynsky, following Manufactured Landscapes and Watermark. The film explores the emerging concept of a geological epoch called the Anthropocene, defined by the impact of humanity on natural development. The documentary film is the centerpiece of the larger Anthropocene Project created as a collaboration between the three filmmakers. The project spans many mediums, and includes museum shows that opened at the Art Gallery of Ontario and the National Gallery of Canada in September 2018, the publication of two books, one centered on essays and the other on photographs, three augmented reality and virtual reality experiences, and three "Gigapixel Essays", hundreds of photos stitched together to form one massive photo. These other parts of the project are mostly representations of scenes from the film in more effective mediums, and all surround the same central theme of the film: Humans and our effect on the earth. Anthropocene: The Human Epoch premiered at the 2018 Toronto International Film Festival (TIFF).

== Awards ==
In December 2018, the Toronto International Film Festival named the film to its annual year-end Canada's Top Ten list.

In January 2019, it was announced as the winner of the Rogers Best Canadian Film Award at the Toronto Film Critics Association Awards 2018. The filmmakers gave the $100,000 prize money to the runners-up and to TIFF's Share Her Journey initiative, which supports women in film.

Also in January 2019, the film received the Vancouver Film Critics Circle award for Best Canadian Documentary Film.

The film won two Canadian Screen Awards at the 7th Canadian Screen Awards in 2019, for Best Feature Length Documentary and Best Cinematography in a Documentary (de Pencier).

== Reception ==
As of October 2021, the film holds an 88% approval rating on Rotten Tomatoes, based on 38 reviews, with an average rating of 7.2/10 on IMDb. The website's critics consensus reads, "Anthropocene: The Human Epoch offers a sobering – and visually ravishing – look at the horrific ecological damage wrought by modern human civilization." On Metacritic, the film has an average rating of 77/100, based on six reviews, indicating "generally favorable reviews".

== See also ==
- Human impact on the environment
