= Daniel Iron =

Canadian film and television producer

Daniel Iron is a Canadian film and television producer. After his company Foundry Films was acquired by Blue Ice Group, he became president of production of that company.

== Recognition ==
- 2008 Genie Award for Best Motion Picture - Away From Her - Won (shared with Simone Urdl, Jennifer Weiss)
- 2007 Genie Award for Best Documentary - Manufactured Landscapes - Won (shared with Jennifer Baichwal, Nicholas de Pencier, Gerry Flahive, Peter Starr)
- 2007 Gemini Award for Best TV movie - Last Exit - Nominated (shared with Richard Lalonde).
- 2006 Gemini Award for Best Dramatic Series - Slings and Arrows - Won (shared with Niv Fichman, Sari Friedland)
- 2004 Gemini Award for Best Dramatic Series - Slings and Arrows - Nominated (shared with Sari Friedland, Niv Fichman)
- 2004 Gemini Award for Best TV Movie or Dramatic Mini-Series - Elizabeth Rex - Nominated (shared with Jennifer Jonas, Niv Fichman)
- 2002 Gemini Award for Best Dramatic Series - Foreign Objects - Nominated (shared with Ken Finkleman, Niv Fichman)
- 1999 Genie Award for Best Motion Picture - Last Night - Nominated (shared with Niv Fichman)
- 1999 Jutra Award for Best Film (Meilleur Film) - The Red Violin - Nominated (shared with Niv Fichman)
- 1996 Genie Award for Best Motion Picture - Long Day's Journey into Night - Nominated (shared with Niv Fichman)
