= Black Code (film) =

- Directed by: Nicholas de Pencier
- Produced by: Nicholas de Pencier; Issa Zaroui
- Edited by: Eric Pedicelli
- Music by: Philip Strong
- Production company: Mercury Films
- Distributed by: Mongrel Media
- Release date: September 13, 2016 (TIFF)
- Running time: 75 minutes
- Country: Canada
- Language: English

Black Code is a Canadian documentary film, directed by Nicholas de Pencier and released in 2016. Based on Ronald Deibert's book Black Code: Surveillance, Privacy, and the Dark Side of the Internet, the film explores the ways in which contemporary technology has facilitated an increasingly sophisticated surveillance infrastructure.

The film premiered at the 2016 Toronto International Film Festival.

The film received a Canadian Screen Award nomination for Best Editing in a Documentary (Eric Pedicelli) at the 6th Canadian Screen Awards in 2017.
