= The Holier It Gets =

- Directed by: Jennifer Baichwal
- Written by: Jennifer Baichwal
- Produced by: Jennifer Baichwal; Nicholas de Pencier
- Cinematography: Nicholas de Pencier
- Edited by: David Wharnsby
- Production company: Mercury Films
- Release date: April 5, 2000
- Running time: 53 minutes
- Country: Canada
- Language: English

The Holier It Gets is a Canadian documentary film, directed by Jennifer Baichwal and released in 2000. The film is a personal document of Baichwal and her family on a pilgrimage to India, honouring their father Krishna's wishes to have his ashes scattered at the source of the Ganges following his death.

It was screened at the 2000 Hot Docs Canadian International Documentary Festival, where it won the award for Best Canadian Feature Documentary. It was distributed primarily on television, airing as an episode of TVOntario's documentary series The View from Here in 2000 and Knowledge Network's Perspectives in 2001.

Following its television broadcast, it was a nominee for the Donald Brittain Award at the 15th Gemini Awards, as well as winning the awards for Best Direction in a Documentary Program or Series (Baichwal), Best Writing in a Documentary Program or Series (Baichwal) and Best Editing in a Documentary Program or Series (David Wharnsby).
