= Let It Come Down: The Life of Paul Bowles =

1998 Canadian documentary film

- Directed by: Jennifer Baichwal
- Produced by: Jennifer Baichwal; Nicholas de Pencier
- Cinematography: James Allodi; Nicholas de Pencier
- Edited by: David Wharnsby
- Music by: Paul Bowles
- Production company: Requisite Productions
- Distributed by: Mongrel Media
- Release date: September 17, 1998 (TIFF)
- Running time: 75 minutes
- Country: Canada
- Language: English

Let It Come Down: The Life of Paul Bowles is a Canadian documentary film, directed by Jennifer Baichwal and released in 1998. The film is a portrait of American writer and composer Paul Bowles.

The film premiered at the 1998 Toronto International Film Festival.

The film received a Genie Award nomination for Best Feature Length Documentary at the 19th Genie Awards, and won the International Emmy Award for Best Arts Documentary at the 27th International Emmy Awards.
