= Long Time Running =

2017 Canadian documentary

- Theatrical release poster
- Directed by: Jennifer Baichwal; Nicholas de Pencier
- Produced by: Rachel McLean; Scot McFadyen
- Starring: The Tragically Hip
- Cinematography: Nicholas de Pencier
- Edited by: Roland Schlimme
- Music by: The Tragically Hip
- Production company: Banger Films
- Distributed by: Bell Media; Elevation Pictures
- Release date: September 13, 2017 (TIFF)
- Country: Canada
- Language: English

Long Time Running is a 2017 Canadian documentary film, directed by Jennifer Baichwal and Nicholas de Pencier. The film profiles the Canadian rock band The Tragically Hip during their Man Machine Poem Tour of 2016, which followed the band's announcement of lead singer Gord Downie's cancer diagnosis.

The film premiered at the 2017 Toronto International Film Festival.

The film takes its name from "Long Time Running", a song from the band's 1991 album Road Apples.

== Production ==
Baichwal and de Pencier, who have known the band for over 20 years, were asked to create the documentary just five days before the beginning of the tour. In an interview on the red carpet prior to its TIFF debut, the filmmakers noted that they had little opportunity to prepare, and likened the circumstances to "running away and...joining the circus."

== Release ==
Following its premiere at TIFF, the film began a brief theatrical run. It was originally scheduled to air on CTV on November 12, 2017, but following Downie's death on October 17 and its announcement the following day, CTV advanced its television premiere to October 20.

On September 13, 2017, ahead of its TIFF premiere, Netflix announced that the film would debut internationally on its streaming service beginning November 29. This deal was not inclusive of Canada, where streaming rights are held by Crave.

The film was released on DVD in November 2017. It is available both as a standalone DVD and as part of a box set with the DVD release of the Man Machine Poem tour's final concert in Kingston.

In 2020, Cineplex Entertainment announced that select Canadian theatres would run a double bill of the Kingston concert and Long Time Running in the week of September 18 as a special event.

== Awards ==
On September 17, the film was named as First Runner Up for TIFF's People's Choice Award for Documentaries.

Roland Schlimme received a Canadian Screen Award nomination for Best Editing in a Documentary at the 6th Canadian Screen Awards.

== See also ==
- Spirit Unforgettable
