= Toronto Film Critics Association Awards 2018 =

Annual Canadian film awards ceremony

22nd Toronto Film Critics Association Awards
- Date: December 9, 2018

Highlights
- Best Picture: Roma
- Most awards: Burning, The Favourite, Roma, First Reformed (2)

The 22nd Toronto Film Critics Association Awards, honoring the best in film for 2018, were awarded on December 9, 2018.

== Winners ==
Category	Winners and nominees	Films
Best Film	Alfonso Cuaron	Roma
Best Film	Lee Chang-dong	Burning
Best Film	Paul Schrader	First Reformed
Best Canadian Film	Jennifer Baichwal, Nicholas de Pencier and Edward Burtynsky	Anthropocene: The Human Epoch
Best Canadian Film	Sadaf Foroughi	Ava
Best Canadian Film	Sofia Bohdanowicz	Maison du Bonheur
Best Actor	Ethan Hawke	First Reformed
Best Actor	Willem Dafoe	At Eternity's Gate
Best Actor	Viggo Mortensen	Green Book
Best Actress	Olivia Colman	The Favourite
Best Actress	Regina Hall	Support the Girls
Best Actress	Melissa McCarthy	Can You Ever Forgive Me?
Best Supporting Actor	Steven Yeun	Burning
Best Supporting Actor	Richard E. Grant	Can You Ever Forgive Me?
Best Supporting Actor	Michael B. Jordan	Black Panther
Best Supporting Actress	Regina King	If Beale Street Could Talk
Best Supporting Actress	Emma Stone	The Favourite
Best Supporting Actress	Rachel Weisz	The Favourite
Best Director	Alfonso Cuaron	Roma
Best Director	Lee Chang-dong	Burning
Best Director	Paul Schrader	First Reformed
Best Screenplay	Deborah Davis and Tony McNamara	The Favourite
Best Screenplay	Paul Schrader	First Reformed
Best Screenplay	Alfonso Cuaron	Roma
Best First Feature	Boots Riley	Sorry to Bother You
Best First Feature	Bo Burnham	Eighth Grade
Best First Feature	Ari Aster	Hereditary
Best Animated Film	Wes Anderson	Isle of Dogs
Best Animated Film	Rich Moore and Phil Johnston	Ralph Breaks the Internet
Best Animated Film	Bob Persichetti, Peter Ramsey and Rodney Rothman	Spider-Man: Into the Spider-Verse
Best Foreign-Language Film	Lee Chang-dong	Burning
Best Foreign-Language Film	Pawel Pawlikowski	Cold War
Best Foreign-Language Film	Alfonso Cuaron	Roma
Best Documentary Film	Morgan Neville	Won't You Be My Neighbor?
Best Documentary Film	Jennifer Baichwal, Nicholas de Pencier and Edward Burtynsky	Anthropocene: The Human Epoch
Best Documentary Film	Elizabeth Chai Vasarhelyi and Jimmy Chin	Free Solo
