= Into the Weeds =

- Directed by: Jennifer Baichwal
- Written by: Jennifer Baichwal
- Produced by: Jennifer Baichwal; Nicholas de Pencier
- Starring: Dewayne "Lee" Johnson
- Cinematography: Nicholas de Pencier; John Price
- Edited by: Roland Schlimme; David Wharnsby
- Production company: Mercury Films
- Release date: April 28, 2022 (Hot Docs)
- Running time: 96 minutes
- Country: Canada
- Language: English

Into the Weeds is a 2022 Canadian documentary film, directed by Jennifer Baichwal. The film centres on Dewayne "Lee" Johnson, the California man whose terminal cancer is claimed to be due to exposure to the herbicide product Roundup led to the landmark Johnson v. Monsanto Co. court case.

The film premiered as the opening film of the 2022 Hot Docs Canadian International Documentary Festival, in advance of a planned television broadcast by CBC Television in fall 2022 as an episode of The Passionate Eye.
