= The Stairs (2016 film) =

- Directed by: Hugh Gibson
- Produced by: Hugh Gibson; Alan Zweig
- Starring: Martin Thompson; Greg Bell; Roxanne Smith
- Cinematography: Hugh Gibson; Cam Woykin
- Edited by: Andres Landau; Ryan Noth
- Production company: Midnight Lamp Films
- Release date: 12 September 2016 (TIFF)
- Running time: 95 minutes
- Country: Canada
- Language: English

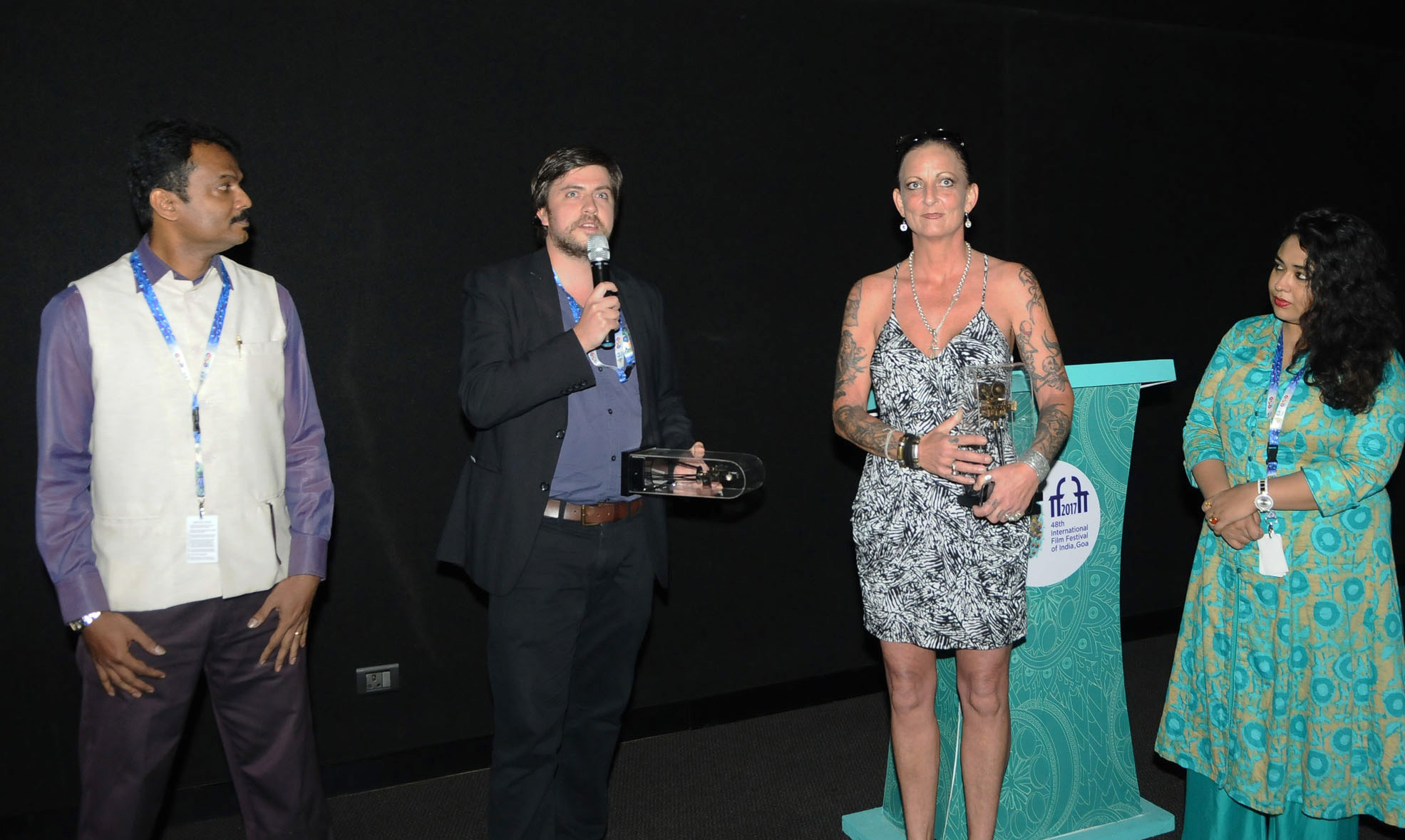
Film crew, IFFI (2017)

The Stairs is a Canadian documentary film by Hugh Gibson, released in 2016. The film, which premiered at the 2016 Toronto International Film Festival, centres on the clients and staff of StreetHealth, a harm reduction health clinic in the Regent Park area of Toronto.

The film was shot over a period of five years.

The film won the award for Best Canadian Film at the Toronto Film Critics Association Awards 2016. It was a finalist for Best Documentary Film, but did not win.
