= Watermark (2013 film) =

- Directed by: Jennifer Baichwal; Edward Burtynsky
- Written by: Jennifer Baichwal
- Produced by: Nicholas de Pencier
- Cinematography: Nicholas de Pencier
- Edited by: Roland Schlimme
- Music by: Martin Tielli; Roland Schlimme
- Production company: Sixth Wave Productions
- Distributed by: Mongrel Media
- Release date: 6 September 2013 (TIFF)
- Running time: 90 minutes
- Country: Canada
- Languages: English; Spanish; Hindi; Bengali; Mandarin
- Box office: $84,464

Watermark is a 2013 Canadian documentary film by Jennifer Baichwal and Edward Burtynsky. It concerns the history and use of water. Burtynsky was previously the subject of Baichwal's 2006 documentary, Manufactured Landscapes. The film looks at water use practices in ten countries around the world, including the United States, China and India.

The film was recorded in various international locations using ultra-high-definition equipment, including a prototype RED Epic that was hand assembled.

The film won the Rogers Best Canadian Film Award at the 2013 Toronto Film Critics Association Awards, over The Dirties and Gabrielle and was named Best Feature Length Documentary at the 2nd Canadian Screen Awards in 2014.
