= Payback: Debt and the Shadow Side of Wealth =

Book by Margaret Atwood, October 2008

Payback Debt and the Shadow Side of Wealth
- Author: Margaret Atwood
- Language: English
- Genre: Non-fiction
- Publisher: House of Anansi Press
- Publication date: October 2008
- Publication place: Canada
- Media type: Print (paperback), audio
- Pages: 240
- ISBN: 978-0-88784-800-1
- Preceded by: The City of Words
- Followed by: The Wayfinders

Payback: Debt and the Shadow Side of Wealth is a non-fiction book written by Margaret Atwood, about the nature of debt, for the 2008 Massey Lectures. Each of the book's five chapters was delivered as a one-hour lecture in a different Canadian city, beginning in St. John's, Newfoundland, on October 12 and ending in Toronto on November 1. The lectures were broadcast on CBC Radio One's Ideas November 10–14. The book was published by House of Anansi Press, both in paperback and in a limited edition hardcover.

The lectures and book had been originally scheduled for 2009, but were moved up to 2008 to avoid conflicting with Atwood's forthcoming novel after the latter book was delayed by its publisher. The content examines borrowing and lending from financial, psychological, theological, literary, and ecological points of view. Its release coincided with extensive media coverage of the 2008 financial crisis which led numerous critics to comment on the book's timeliness. In the Canadian market, the book peaked at #1 on The Globe and Mail bestseller list on October 25 and out-sold all previous Massey Lecture books. Critics found the book well-researched, thought-provoking, and humorous. Various reviewers found the discussions on the non-monetary aspects of debt to be the better parts of the book, while some critics identified the sections on ecological debt as the worst parts of the book.

Atwood's Massey Lectures have been adapted as a 2012 documentary Payback, produced by the National Film Board of Canada, which premiered at the Sundance Film Festival in January 2012.

== Background ==
Toronto-based author Margaret Atwood was asked several times over numerous years to deliver a Massey Lecture, which would be broadcast over the radio on CBC Radio One's Ideas and published by the House of Anansi Press. When she finally agreed, she chose her subject to be sociobiology of literary criticism, and specifically how an author's gender and age affects critical reception. However, after delivering lectures at Oxford University and Cambridge University on similar topics she re-considered her choice. She began thinking of 'debt' as a topic after writing "Letter to America" for The Globe and Mail in March 2003 (later reprinted in The Nation) regarding the pending invasion of Iraq and asking whether Americans understood the debt to which they were committing.

Atwood was scheduled to release her new novel in fall 2008 and deliver the Massey Lectures in fall 2009. At the insistence of Atwood's American editor at Doubleday, her Canadian and British editors and agents agreed in January 2008 to postpone the release of her novel by one year to avoid competing with the US Presidential election for attention. The people organizing the Massey Lectures, Sarah McLachlan of House of Anansi Press, John Fraser of Massey College, and Bernie Lucht of CBC's Ideas, discovered this rescheduling via a newspaper article. They asked Atwood to deliver her lectures in fall 2008, meaning the text would be due in June. She agreed on condition of Massey College providing research and technical assistance. The text was written between late January and June 2008, during which Atwood took time for two vacations (birding in Cuba and in France). The original title was to be Debt but Scott Griffin, owner of House of Anansi Press, convinced Atwood to change it to something less depressing.

== Synopsis ==
The content is divided into five parts. The first part, Ancient Balances, considers psychological and historical aspects of debt. Atwood calls debt an imaginative human construct derived from a sense of need or greed and a sense of fairness in reciprocity and equivalent values. She cites a study by Frans de Waal that suggests a sense of fairness may be a genetic trait shared with other primates, and a study by Robert Axelrod which illustrates, given a level playing field, that the tit-for-tat strategy (or 'Do unto others as they have done unto you' strategy) was the most superior strategy in game theory. Debt and borrowing mechanisms from ancient and biblical societies are compared, including provisions from the Code of Hammurabi, Ancient Egyptians, and the Greco-Roman mythologies.

The second part, Debt and Sin, explores the theological side, including moral or ethical characteristics attributed to debtors and creditors by society and religion. Debt, like certain vices, such as cigarette-smoking, have experienced times when it was considered sinful, and other times fashionable. Biblical references, like the Book of Deuteronomy, the Lord's Prayer, and sin-eating, are examined. The growth of debt is linked to the growth of the written media with the relationship symbolized by the Faustian contract with the devil.

The third part, Debt as Plot, examines the "Debtor" game from Eric Berne's Games People Play and its derivative "Try and Collect". Debt as a motif and theme is explained, especially in 19th century literature, with examples from "The Devil and Tom Walker", Wuthering Heights, Vanity Fair, Madame Bovary, House of Mirth, and The Mill on the Floss. Atwood posits a theory that Charles Dickens' Ebenezer Scrooge is the reverse character of Christopher Marlowe's Doctor Faustus; although Scrooge is rich, he is unwilling to spend his money and is living miserably before he is saved., while Doctor Faustus is rich, happy, and generous but ends in hell.

The fourth part, The Shadow Side, looks at what happens to debtors and creditors when debts are not re-paid. Some debts that are a matter of honour to which the debtor must repay by an equivalent value or creditor must either forgive or exact revenge. Debts to society, after committing crimes, are paid through vengeance-based imprisonment. The United Kingdom had debtors' prison for those who could not pay, but this was abolished for economic reasons as it prevented labourers from working and had a burdensome cost of operation. Other societies used the services of their family members or themselves as collateral. Sometimes the debtors overthrew the creditors, like King Philip IV of France against the Knights Templar, or the Ugandans against the Asians. Atwood applies the trickle-down economics to debt and examines the psychology side through the Jungian Shadow.

In the final part, titled Payback, Atwood examines ecological debt. She recounts the journey of Scrooge in A Christmas Carol but placed in a modern setting. The modern-day Scrooge is visited by the spirits of Earth Day. In the past, Scrooge witnesses debts to nature being repaid through animal and human sacrifices and through pestilence in over-crowded or unsustainable populations. In the present, Scrooge witnesses current unsustainable practices, over-fishing and deforestation, creating a debt to nature being repaid through effects on the climate and impacts on people. Finally, in the future, Scrooge is shown two versions: one showing an eco-friendly human society balanced with environmental systems, the other showing a dystopian future in which a disaster affects fuel or food resources, causing hyperinflation and rendering money useless.

== Publication and sales ==
The book was released in October 2008 as Atwood began the Massey lecture series in St. John's, Newfoundland, on October 12. The second lecture took place in Vancouver on the 15th, followed by Winnipeg on the 17th, Montreal on the 20th, and ending on November 1 in Toronto. The series was recorded then aired on CBC Radio One's Ideas between November 10 and 14. At each event Atwood fielded questions from the audience and participated in book signings.

Payback entered The Globe and Mail bestseller list at #6 and peaked at #1 on October 25. It became the best selling Massey Lecture book to date and was in its fourth printing by the end of November. Excerpts were printed in The Times and the Financial Times. In April 2009, it was a finalist for the annual National Business Book Award and won a silver medal in the Business Ethics category of the Axiom Business Book Awards. That same month, the National Film Board of Canada acquired the film rights, with plans to adapt Payback as a feature-length documentary. They announced the involvement of Jennifer Baichwal as director and Ravida Din as producer. In June 2009, the book was awarded a Canadian Booksellers Association Libris Award for Non-Fiction Book of the Year.

Almost all reviewers commented upon the timeliness of the book's release as the magnitude and causes of the 2008 financial crisis were becoming apparent. Some reviewers also commented upon the timeliness of her previous books, like her novel in which society is devastated by a genetically engineered virus, Oryx and Crake, which coincided with the SARS outbreak. Playing off this theme Canadian magazine The Walrus, at a fund-raiser gala for its charitable foundation, auctioned a crystal decanter with five predictions written by Atwood sealed inside. Journalist Rebecca Eckler was the winning bidder and wrote about the predictions, which include the diminished use of fabric softener and the rise in use of industrial hemp, in an article for Maclean's magazine.

== Critical response ==
she is advancing ... [a] claim that economic activities involving borrowing and lending are metaphorical extensions of an underlying human sense of indebtedness. Beliefs about debt are not shadows cast by processes of market exchange. They are presupposed throughout much of human activity. Economic life invokes a sense of order in human affairs, widely dispersed throughout society.

— John N. Gray, The New York Review of Books

Critics found the book well-researched and thought-provoking. Reviewers enjoyed Atwood's humour and conversational writing. The style was described as "eclectic", a "literary walkabout", and "anecdotally rich". Novelist David Liss wrote that the book was "delightfully engaging, smart, funny, [and] clever". Canadian writer Charles Foran called the book "serious adult fun" that "displays some of the energy of a lively dinner party, one replete with anecdotes and opinions, witticisms and barbs". The book's most entertaining parts are discussions on non-monetary debts and debts portrayed in literature. Regarding the speeches, the reviewer for The Montreal Gazette wrote: "Her delivery, as usual, was smooth, relentlessly paced, but with precise pauses for the frequent, much-appreciated laugh lines." John N. Gray, in The New York Review of Books, wrote that "Atwood has combined rigorous analysis, wide-ranging erudition, and a beguilingly playful imagination". The Library Journal recommended the book for all libraries.

Negative reviews came from Salon.com and The Scotsman. Louis Bayard of Salon.com disagreed with the delivery of the final chapter, on ecological debt, writing that Atwood "forsakes artistic engagement for ideological reflex". William Skidelsky in The Guardian agreed that the chapter was "by no means the highlight of the book". He also wrote: "Because Atwood constantly veers off in new directions she doesn't always give herself time to sink her claws deep into a topic. The result is that, although Payback is packed with information, it can seem oddly thin... Still, Atwood's enthusiasm for her subject and lively style go a long way toward making up for these flaws. She can be a brilliant phrase-maker, and has a gift for summing up an idea with a single vivid image." Allan Massie, reviewing for The Scotsman, could not find a coherent argument being presented and found her writing style "veering uncomfortably between the academic and the jokily colloquial, [is] tiresome, [and] some of her writing is pretentious, much obvious and platitudinous". The reviewers in Salon.com and The Scotsman, as well as The Economist, were all uncomfortable with Atwood not distinguishing or contrasting 'good' and 'bad' debt.
