= Edward Burtynsky =

Canadian photographer and artist

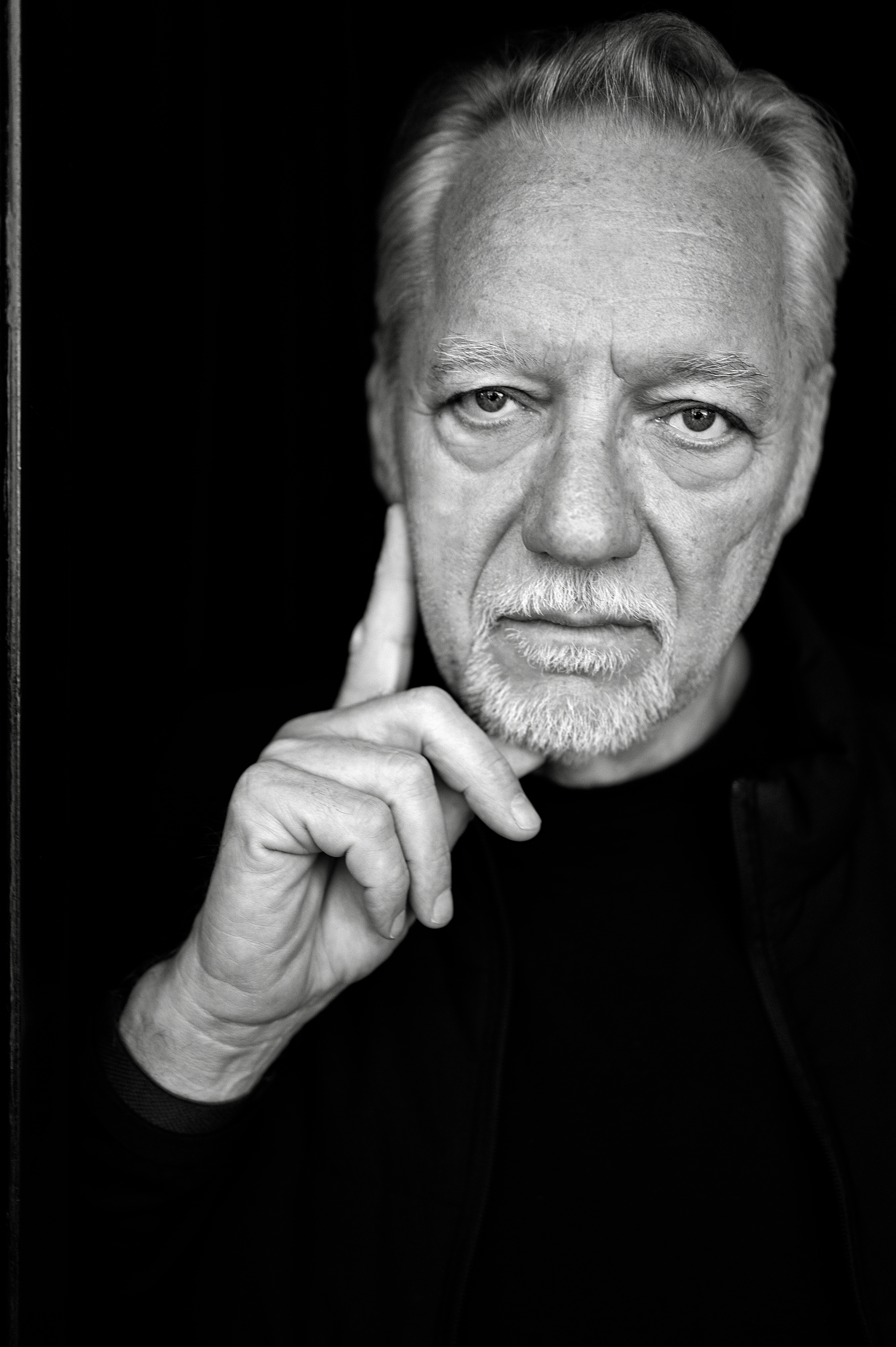
- Burtynsky in 2024
- Born: February 22, 1955 (age 71); St. Catharines, Ontario, Canada
- Occupations: photographer, artist
- Awards: Officer of the Order of Canada; 2006 TED Prize; 2005; Geological Society of America President's Medal; 2013; Roger's Best Canadian Film Award; 2013; Best Feature Length Documentary; 2014; Master of Photo; 2018; Peace Patron Award; 2018; Best Canadian Documentary; 2019 Honorary Fellowship of the Royal Photographic Society; 2020
- Website: www.edwardburtynsky.com

Edward Burtynsky OC RCA LL. D (born February 22, 1955) is a Canadian photographer and artist known for his large format photographs of industrial landscapes. His works depict locations from around the world that represent the increasing development of industrialization and its impacts on nature and the human existence. It is most often connected to the philosophical concept of the sublime, a trait established by the grand scale of the work he creates, though they are equally disturbing in the way they reveal the context of rapid industrialization.

Burtynsky is a 2005 winner of the TED Prize. In 2016 he received the Governor General's Awards in Visual and Media Arts for his collection of works.

Burtynsky is an advocate for environmental conservationism and his work is deeply entwined in his advocacy. In TED's description of his work, it notes his "large-format color photographs explore the impact of humanity's expanding footprint and the substantial ways in which we're reshaping the surface of the planet." He sits on the board of Contact, Toronto's international festival of photography.

== Early life ==
Burtynsky was born in St. Catharines, Ontario, a blue-collar town where General Motors was the largest employer. His father, Peter Burtynsky, was a Ukrainian immigrant who found work on the production line at the General Motors plant. When Burtynsky was 11 years old, his father purchased a darkroom and cameras from a widow whose late husband had practiced amateur photography. Burtynsky was given two rolls of Tri-X film and told to make do with that or support the habit through his own means. Along with learning black and white photography, he learned black and white segregation. This would prove to be useful in the development of his own business to support his new-found habit as he began photographing events and providing portraits at his local Ukrainian community center, charging 50 cents per photograph. With the money he made, he travelled throughout the countryside of St. Catharines photographing the "pristine landscapes" of his childhood. This is where he would later attribute his interest in pursuing landscape photography.

== Education and early career ==
From the mid-1970s to early 1980s, Burtynsky formally studied graphic arts and photography. He obtained a diploma in graphic design from Niagara College in Welland, Ontario, beginning his studies in 1974. After receiving his collegial diploma, he had not initially considered pursuing higher education, but quickly changed his mind when touring the Ryerson campus on a request from a former photography teacher of his. He enrolled and completed the four-year undergraduate program and obtained a Bachelor's in Photographic Arts (Media Studies Program) from Ryerson Polytechnical Institute in Toronto, Ontario, in 1982.

Burtynsky's earliest works, now donated to Ryerson University's Image Center are primarily taken in locations across Ontario and Western Canada. Influenced by American photographers such as Ansel Adams, Edward Weston and Carleton Watkins, these works consist mostly of colored landscapes. Some of his earliest original landscape photographs such as Landscape Study #1, North Carolina, USA (1979) and Landscape Study #2, Ontario, Canada (1981) served as portfolio submissions for Ryerson and displayed traces of his early exploration into the main themes of his work: human control over nature. Burtynsky briefly worked in photography departments for IBM and the Ontario Hospital Association peri-graduation and in architecture post-graduation. In 1985, he founded Toronto Image Works, a studio space that doubled as a darkroom rental facility, custom photo laboratory and training center for digital and new media.

Some of Burtynsky's breakout works post-graduation such as Breaking Ground: Mines, Railcuts and Homesteads (1983–1985) and Vermont Quarries (1991–1992) show a transition toward the human impact themes that mark his later work. Many of these indicate an account of the ecology of human interaction and the pillaging of landscapes which include the dialogue between the human, machine and the earth.

== Photography ==
Most of Burtynsky's exhibited photography (pre-2007) was taken with a large format, field camera, on large 4×5-inch sheet film and developed into high-resolution, large-dimension prints of various sizes and editions ranging from 18 × 22 inches to 60 × 80 inches. He often positions himself at high-vantage points over the landscape using elevated platforms, the natural topography, and more currently drones, helicopters and fixed-wing aircraft. Burtynsky describes the act of taking a photograph in terms of "The Contemplated Moment", evoking and in contrast to, "The Decisive Moment" of Henri Cartier-Bresson. He currently uses a high-resolution digital medium format camera.

Burtynsky's photographic style is characterized by the sublime nature of the scale of his photographs. His large-format view camera depicts humanity's scarring on the landscapes he makes his subject, with "astonishing color and relentless detail", always focusing on the consequences of global consumerism. Burtynsky's photography places the viewer in a state of non-intervention with the environments depicted. While the viewer witnesses the consequences of radicalized consumerism, the viewer is left to quietly contemplate its political articulation: neither a condemnation nor a celebration of the subject matter, simply an acknowledgement of its existence, to create dialogue, not to dichotomize.

=== Manufactured Landscapes (2003) ===
Manufactured Landscapes is a collection of more than 60 large scale images, many as large as 48 by 60 inches, depicting Burtynsky's travels around the world capturing stunning transformations of nature into industrial landscapes. In 2003, Burtynsky developed a series of images conveying China's contemporary transformation into industrialization which was included as part of the exhibit. Using a 4×5 large format camera he presented the result of Western consumerism on the industrialization of China while depicting the effects of the environmental devastation caused by Chinese industrial ambitions in China.

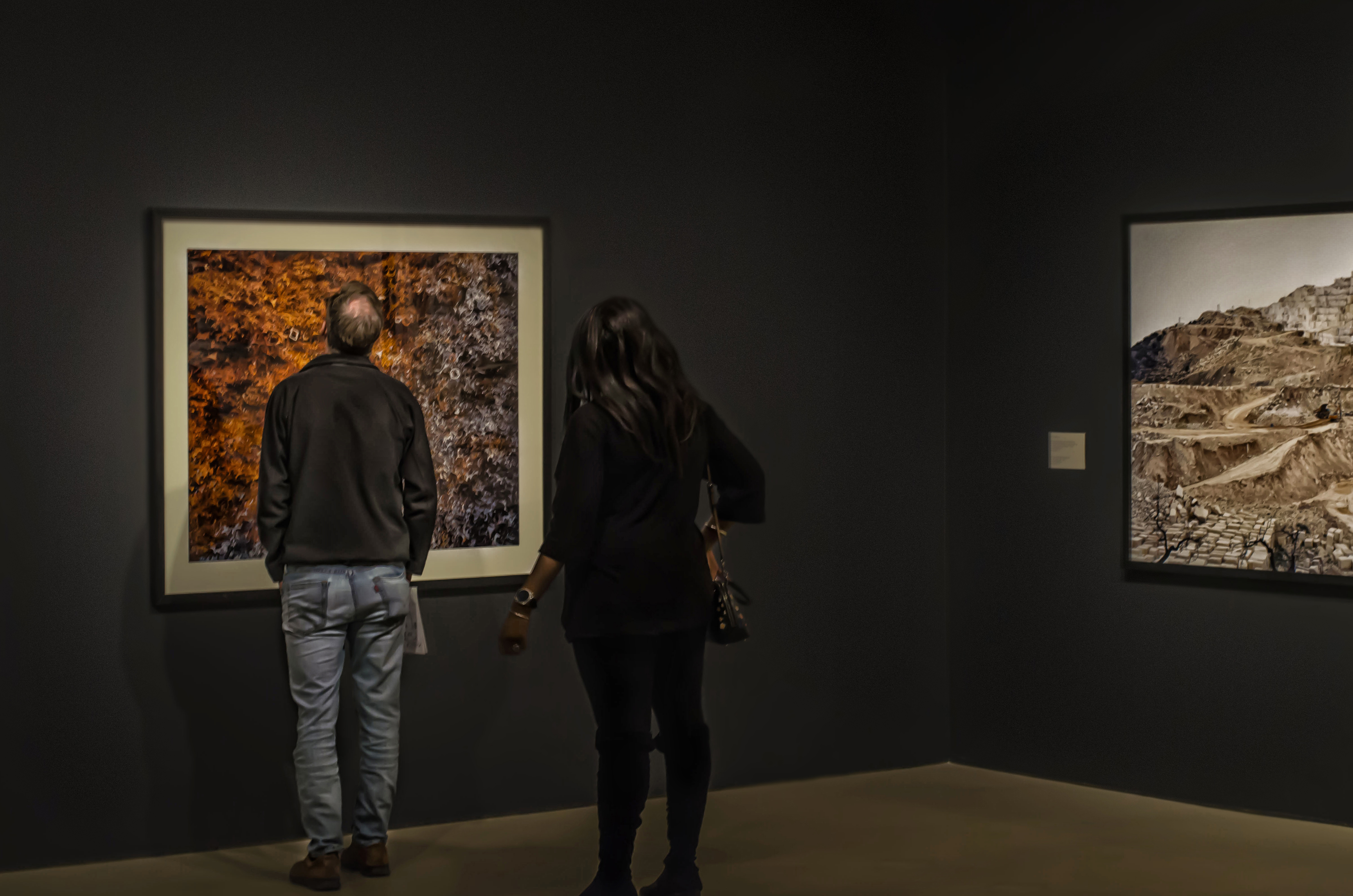
People viewing a Burtynsky show at the Art Gallery of Hamilton

Burtynsky photographs sweeping views of landscapes altered by industry: mine tailings, quarries, scrap piles. The grandeur of his images is often in tension with the compromised environments they depict. He has made several excursions to China to photograph that country's industrial emergence, and construction of one of the world's largest engineering projects, the Three Gorges Dam.

=== Photographic series ===
- 1983–1985 Breaking Ground: Mines, Railcuts and Homesteads, Canada, USA
- 1991–1992 Vermont Quarries, USA
- 1997–1999 Urban Mines: Metal Recycling, Canada Tire Piles, USA
- 1993 Carrara Quarries, Italy
- 1995–1996 Tailings, Canada
- 1999–2010 Oil Canada, China, Azerbaijan, USA
- 2000 Makrana Quarries, India
- 2000–2001 Shipbreaking, Bangladesh
- 2004–2006 China
- 2006 Iberia Quarries, Portugal
- 2007 Australian Mines, Western Australia
- 2009–2013 Water Canada, USA, Mexico, Europe, Asia, Iceland, India
- 2016 Salt Pans
- 2014–2018 Anthropocene
- 2014 Chai Eastern Europe

=== Toronto Image Works ===
In 1985, Burtynsky established Toronto Image Works, a commercial photography lab, which has evolved into a facility that also offers darkroom rentals, equipment use and digital new-media courses. In 1986 the facility opened a gallery space which displays the work of local and international artists.

== Film and other mediums ==
=== Manufactured Landscapes (documentary) ===
In 2006, Burtynsky was the subject of the documentary film, Manufactured Landscapes, which was shown at the 2007 Sundance Film Festival in the World Cinema Documentary Competition.

=== Watermark ===
Burtynsky and Jennifer Baichwal, who directed Manufactured Landscapes, are co-directors of the 2013 documentary film, Watermark. The film is part of his five-year project, Water, focusing on the way water is used and managed.

=== Anthropocene: The Human Epoch and The Anthropocene Project ===
The Anthropocene Project is a multidisciplinary body of work from collaborators Nicholas de Pencier, Burtynsky and Baichwal. Combining art, film, virtual reality, augmented reality, and scientific research, the project investigates human influence on the state, dynamic and future of the Earth. Anthropocene means a new era of geological time where human activity is the driving force behind environmental and geological change.

In September 2018, Anthropocene: The Human Epoch, made its world premiere at the Toronto International Film Festival (TIFF). In 2019, it won the Rogers Best Canadian Film Award at the Toronto Film Critics Association Awards 2018. The filmmakers gave the $100,000 prize money to the runners-up and to TIFF's Share Her Journey initiative, which supports women in film.

Two complementary exhibitions also debuted in September 2018 at the Art Gallery of Ontario and National Gallery of Canada. In 2019, the exhibition toured to Fondazione MAST in Bologna, Italy.

=== In the Wake of Progress ===
Burtynsky's In the Wake of Progress: Images of the Industrial Landscape has been a webcast in 2003, and a touring immersive multimedia experience, blending music, photography and film, in 2021–2022.

== Exhibitions ==
- Manufactured Landscapes (2003), National Gallery of Canada in Ottawa, touring exhibition
- Manufactured Landscapes: The Photographs of Edward Burtynsky (2005-2006), Brooklyn Museum in New York
- Burtynsky/OIL (2011) Fotografiska Stockholm, Sweden
- Water (2013), New Orleans Museum of Art and Contemporary Art Center in Louisiana, international touring exhibition
- Infinite Change (2016-2017), Kitchener-Waterloo Art Gallery in Ontario, Canada
- Anthropocene (2018), Art Gallery of Ontario and National Gallery of Canada, international touring exhibition
- Edward Burtynsky: African Studies (2023) CentroCentro, Plaza de Cibeles, Madrid, Spain
- Abstraction and the Altered Landscape (2023) Fotografiska Shanghai, China. The exhibition was selected as one of the four opening shows at Fotografiska Shanghai.
- Extraction/Abstraction (2024), Saatchi Gallery in London, UK
- Taking Root: Recent Acquisitions (2025) Art Gallery of Hamilton, Hamilton, Ontario

== Group exhibitions ==
- Civilisation: The Way We Live Now, Foundation for the Exhibition of Photography, Lausanne, 2022–23

== Awards ==
- Member of the Royal Canadian Academy of Arts.
- Honorary doctorate in Laws, from Mt. Allison University, Sackville, New Brunswick, Canada
- Honorary doctorate in Laws, from Queen's University, Kingston
- Honorary doctorate in Laws, from Brock University (2018), St. Catharines, Ontario, Canada
- Honorary doctorate in Fine Arts in Photography Study from Ryerson University (now Toronto Metropolitan University), Toronto
- Honorary doctorate in Fine Arts, from Montserrat College of Art, Boston
- 2003: Roloff Beny Photography Book Awards
- 2005: TED Prize
- 2006: Officer of the Order of Canada
- 2008: Infinity Award (Art) by International Center of Photography.
- 2013: Geological Society of America President's Medal.
- 2013: Rogers Best Canadian Film Award at the 2013 Toronto Film Critics Association Awards for Watermark (2013).
- 2014: Best Feature Length Documentary at the 2014 Canadian Screen Awards for Watermark (2013).
- 2016: List of Laureates of the Governor General's Award in Visual and Media Arts, Canada Council, Ottawa, Canada
- 2018: Master of Photography, Photo London, London
- 2018: Peace Patron Award by The Mosaic Institute, an NGO based in Toronto working to promote pluralism reducing conflict in Canada and abroad.
- 2019: Rogers Best Canadian Film Award for Anthropocene: The Human Epoch at the Toronto Film Critics Association Awards 2018, a $100,000 prize
- 2019: Best Canadian Documentary Award for Anthropocene: The Human Epoch at the Vancouver Film Critics Circle Awards 2018
- 2019: Arts & Letters Award Honouree by The Canadian Association of New York at the annual Maple Leaf Ball.
- 2020: Honorary Fellowship of the Royal Photographic Society, Bristol
- 2021: Outstanding Contribution to Photography, 2022 Sony World Photography Awards
- 2022: Induction into the International Photography Hall of Fame and Museum.

== Collections ==
Burtynsky's work is held in the following permanent collection:

- National Gallery of Canada, Ottawa, Ontario, Canada: 122 works (as of February 2021)

== See also ==
- New Topographics

== General references ==
- Granta, This overheating world. The Magazine of New Writing, 83. Fall 2003. Noah Richler: The Evidence of Man, Edward Burtynsky. p. 95.
- Before the Flood. Essay by Gary Michael Dault. 2003
- Dargis, Manohla (June 20, 2007). "Industrial China's Ravaging of Nature, Made Disturbingly Sublime". The New York Times. Archived from the original on 2007-10-17.
