= Toronto Film Critics Association Award for Best Film =

List of Toronto film critics cited best films

The Toronto Film Critics Association Award for Best Film is one of the annual awards given by the Toronto Film Critics Association.

== Winners ==
=== 1990s ===
Year	Winner	Director(s)	Ref
1997	The Sweet Hereafter	Atom Egoyan	
1997	Boogie Nights	Paul Thomas Anderson	
1997	The Ice Storm	Ang Lee	
1997	L.A. Confidential	Curtis Hanson	
1997	Titanic	James Cameron	
1998	Saving Private Ryan	Steven Spielberg	
1998	The Celebration	Thomas Vinterberg	
1998	Elizabeth	Shekhar Kapur	
1998	Happiness	Todd Solondz	
1998	Out of Sight	Steven Soderbergh	
1999	Magnolia	Paul Thomas Anderson	
1999	Being John Malkovich	Spike Jonze	

=== 2000s ===
Year	Winner	Director(s)	Ref
2000	Crouching Tiger, Hidden Dragon (Wo hu cang long)	Ang Lee	
2000	Traffic	Steven Soderbergh	
2001	Memento	Christopher Nolan	
2001	Amélie (Le Fabuleux Destin d'Amélie Poulain)	Jean-Pierre Jeunet	
2001	Mulholland Drive	David Lynch	
2002	Adaptation.	Spike Jonze	
2002	Punch-Drunk Love	Paul Thomas Anderson	
2002	Y tu mamá también	Alfonso Cuarón	
2003	Lost in Translation	Sofia Coppola	
2004	Sideways	Alexander Payne	
2005	A History of Violence	David Cronenberg	
2006	The Queen	Stephen Frears	
2006	The Departed	Martin Scorsese	
2006	United 93	Paul Greengrass	
2007	No Country for Old Men	Joel Coen and Ethan Coen	
2007	Eastern Promises	David Cronenberg	
2007	Zodiac	David Fincher	
2008	Wendy and Lucy	Kelly Reichardt	
2008	Rachel Getting Married	Jonathan Demme	
2008	WALL-E	Andrew Stanton	
2009	Hunger	Steve McQueen	
2009	Inglourious Basterds	Quentin Tarantino	
2009	The Hurt Locker	Kathryn Bigelow	

=== 2010s ===
Year	Winner	Director(s)	Ref
2010	The Social Network	David Fincher	
2010	Black Swan	Darren Aronofsky	
2010	Uncle Boonmee Who Can Recall His Past Lives	Apichatpong Weerasethakul	
2011	The Tree of Life	Terrence Malick	
2011	The Artist	Michel Hazanavicius	
2011	The Descendants	Alexander Payne	
2012	The Master	Paul Thomas Anderson	
2012	Amour	Michael Haneke	
2012	Zero Dark Thirty	Kathryn Bigelow	
2013	Inside Llewyn Davis	Joel Coen and Ethan Coen	
2013	Her	Spike Jonze	
2013	12 Years a Slave	Steve McQueen	
2014	Boyhood	Richard Linklater	
2014	The Grand Budapest Hotel	Wes Anderson	
2014	Inherent Vice	Paul Thomas Anderson	
2015	Carol	Todd Haynes	
2015	Mad Max: Fury Road	George Miller	
2015	Spotlight	Tom McCarthy	
2016	Moonlight	Barry Jenkins	
2016	Manchester by the Sea	Kenneth Lonergan	
2016	Toni Erdmann	Maren Ade	
2017	The Florida Project	Sean Baker	
2017	Phantom Thread	Paul Thomas Anderson	
2017	Three Billboards Outside Ebbing, Missouri	Martin McDonagh	
2018	Roma	Alfonso Cuarón	
2018	Burning	Lee Chang-dong	
2018	First Reformed	Paul Schrader	
2019	Parasite	Bong Joon-ho	
2019	The Irishman	Martin Scorsese	
2019	Marriage Story	Noah Baumbach	

=== 2020s ===
Year	Winner	Director(s)	Ref
2020	Nomadland	Chloé Zhao	
2020	First Cow	Kelly Reichardt	
2020	Minari	Lee Isaac Chung	
2021	Drive My Car	Ryusuke Hamaguchi	
2021	Licorice Pizza	Paul Thomas Anderson	
2021	The Power of the Dog	Jane Campion	
2022	Aftersun	Charlotte Wells	
2022	Everything Everywhere All at Once	Daniel Kwan and Daniel Scheinert	
2022	Women Talking	Sarah Polley	
2023	The Zone of Interest	Jonathan Glazer	
2023	All of Us Strangers	Andrew Haigh	
2023	Killers of the Flower Moon	Martin Scorsese	
2024	Nickel Boys	RaMell Ross	
2024	Anora	Sean Baker	
2024	The Brutalist	Brady Corbet	
2025	One Battle After Another	Paul Thomas Anderson	
2025	Hamnet	Chloé Zhao	
2025	Sinners	Ryan Coogler	

== Directors with multiple nominations ==
- Paul Thomas Anderson - 8 (3 wins)
- Spike Jonze - 3 (1 win)
