= Shelby Lee Adams =

American photographer

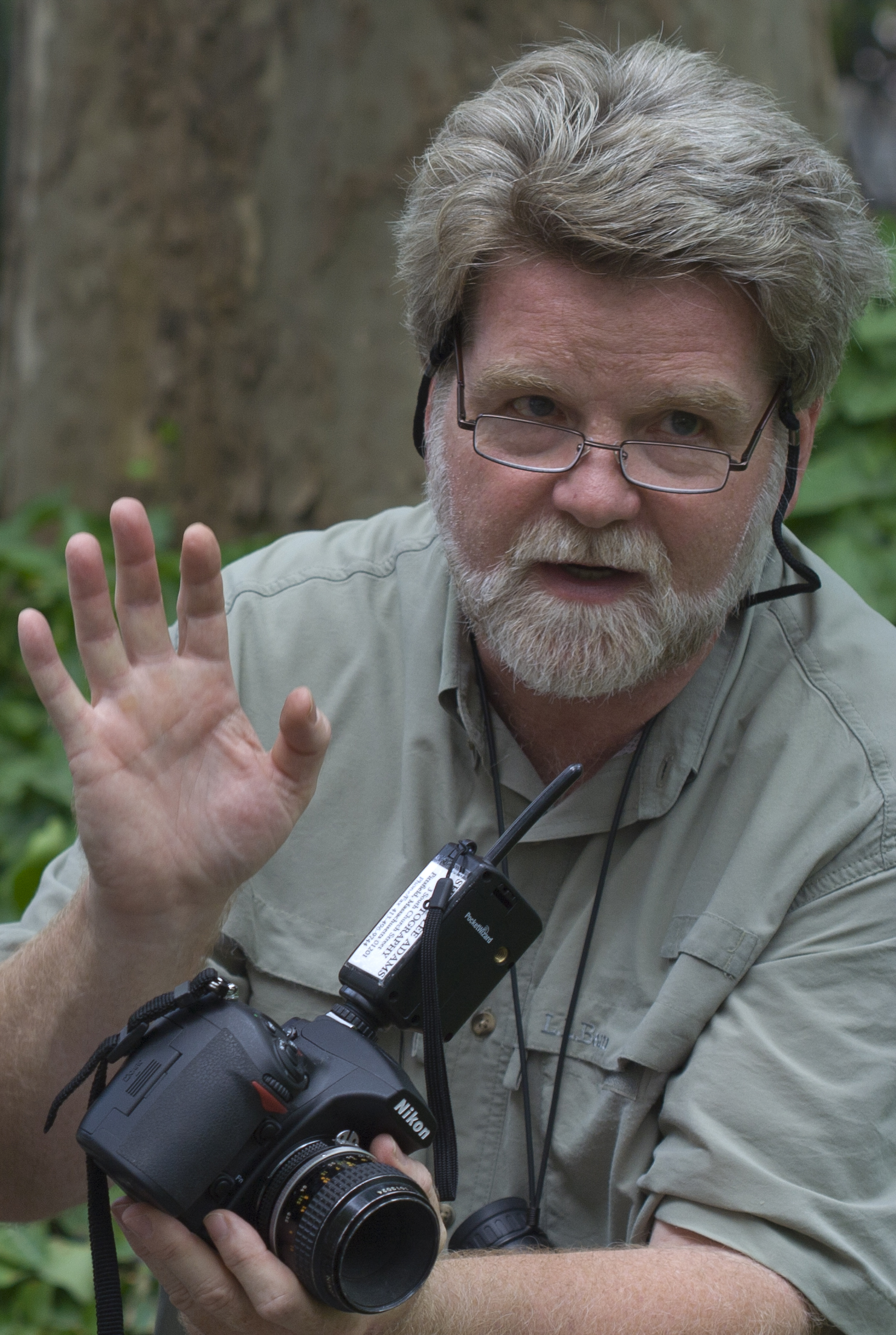
- Adams in 2010
- Born: October 24, 1950 (age 75); Hazard, Kentucky
- Education: Cleveland Institute of Art, Massachusetts College of Art and Design
- Known for: Photography

Shelby Lee Adams (born October 24, 1950) is an American environmental portrait photographer and artist best known for his images of Appalachian family life.

== Life and career ==
Adams has photographed Appalachian families since the mid-1970s. He had first encountered the poor families of the Appalachian Mountains as a child, travelling around the area with his uncle, who was a doctor. His work has been published in three monographs: Appalachian Portraits (1993), Appalachian Legacy (1998), and Appalachian Lives (2003).

== The True Meaning of Pictures ==
Adams was the subject of a documentary film by Jennifer Baichwal in 2002 - The True Meaning of Pictures: Shelby Lee Adams's Appalachia. This was shown at the Toronto International Film Festival, and at the Sundance Festival in 2003. The film critiques and defends Adams' method in photographing Appalachian people for his previously published books.

== Awards ==
- 2010 Guggenheim Fellowship

== Books by Adams ==
- Appalachian Portraits. Jackson: University Press of Mississippi, 1993. ISBN 0-87805-646-7; ISBN 0-87805-667-X.
- Appalachian Legacy: Photographs. Jackson: University Press of Mississippi, 1998. ISBN 1-57806-048-6; ISBN 1-57806-049-4.
- Appalachian Lives. Jackson: University Press of Mississippi, 2003. ISBN 1-57806-540-2.
- Salt and Truth. Richmond, Va.: Candela, 2011. ISBN 0-9845739-1-7.

== Permanent collections ==
- Art Institute of Chicago, Chicago
- Museum of Contemporary Photography, Chicago
- International Center of Photography, New York City
- Musée de l'Élysée, Lausanne
- Museum of Modern Art, New York
- Fogg Museum, Cambridge, Massachusetts
- National Gallery of Canada, Ottawa
- San Francisco Museum of Modern Art
- Smithsonian American Art Museum, Washington, DC
- Stedelijk Museum, Amsterdam
- Time Life Collection, Rockefeller Center, New York
- Victoria and Albert Museum, London
- Whitney Museum of American Art, New York
- Middle Tennessee State University, Murfreesboro
