= Toronto Film Critics Association Awards 2006 =

Annual Canadian film awards ceremony

10th TFCA Awards

December 19, 2006

Best Film:
The Queen

The 10th Toronto Film Critics Association Awards, honoring the best in film for 2006, were given on 19 December 2006.

== Winners ==
- Best Actor:
  - Sacha Baron Cohen - Borat: Cultural Learnings of America for Make Benefit Glorious Nation of Kazakhstan

Runners-Up: Ryan Gosling – Half Nelson and Forest Whitaker – The Last King of Scotland

- Best Actress:
  - Helen Mirren - The Queen

Runners-Up: Penélope Cruz – Volver and Judi Dench – Notes on a Scandal

- Best Animated Film:
  - Happy Feet

Runners-Up: Over the Hedge and A Scanner Darkly

- Best Canadian Film:
  - Manufactured Landscapes

Runners-Up: The Journals of Knud Rasmussen, Monkey Warfare and Six Figures

- Best Director (tie):
  - Jean-Pierre and Luc Dardenne - L'Enfant
  - Stephen Frears - The Queen

Runners-Up: Paul Greengrass – United 93 and Martin Scorsese – The Departed

- Best Documentary Film:
  - Manufactured Landscapes

Runners-Up: Deliver Us from Evil and An Inconvenient Truth

- Best Film:
  - The Queen

Runners-Up: The Departed and United 93

- Best First Feature:
  - Thank You for Smoking

Runners-Up: Brick and Little Miss Sunshine

- Best Foreign Language Film:
  - L'Enfant • Belgium

Runners-Up: Pan's Labyrinth • Mexico/Spain and Volver • Spain

- Best Screenplay:
  - The Queen - Peter Morgan

Runners-Up: Babel – Guillermo Arriaga and The Departed – William Monahan

- Best Supporting Actor:
  - Michael Sheen - The Queen

Runners-Up: Danny Huston – The Proposition and Mark Wahlberg – The Departed

- Best Supporting Actress:
  - Cate Blanchett - Notes on a Scandal

Runners-Up: Jennifer Hudson – Dreamgirls and Rinko Kikuchi – Babel
