= Toronto Film Critics Association Award for Best Supporting Actor =

Canadian film award

The Toronto Film Critics Association Award for Best Supporting Actor was an annual award given by the Toronto Film Critics Association.

== Winners ==
=== 2000s ===
Year	Winner	Film	Role	Ref
2000	Tobey Maguire	Wonder Boys	James Leer	
2000	Jeffrey Wright	Shaft	Peoples Hernandez	
2001	Ben Kingsley	Sexy Beast	Don Logan	
2001	Steve Buscemi	Ghost World	Seymour	
2001	Ian McKellen	The Lord of the Rings: The Fellowship of the Ring	Gandalf	
2002	Chris Cooper	Adaptation.	John Laroche	
2002	Paul Newman	Road to Perdition	John Rooney	
2002	Dennis Quaid	Far from Heaven	Frank Whitaker	
2003	Peter Sarsgaard	Shattered Glass	Charles Lane	
2004	Clive Owen	Closer	Larry Gray	
2005	Paul Giamatti	Cinderella Man	Joe Gould	
2006	Michael Sheen	The Queen	Tony Blair	
2006	Danny Huston	The Proposition	Arthur Burns	
2006	Mark Wahlberg	The Departed	Sgt. Sean Dignam	
2007	Javier Bardem	No Country for Old Men	Anton Chigurh	
2007	Casey Affleck	The Assassination of Jesse James...	Robert Ford	
2007	Philip Seymour Hoffman	Charlie Wilson's War	Gust Avrakotos	
2008	Heath Ledger	The Dark Knight	The Joker	
2008	Josh Brolin	Milk	Dan White	
2008	Robert Downey, Jr.	Tropic Thunder	Kirk Lazarus	
2008	Philip Seymour Hoffman	Doubt	Father Brendan Flynn	
2009	Christoph Waltz	Inglourious Basterds	Hans Landa	
2009	Christian McKay	Me and Orson Welles	Orson Welles	
2009	Timothy Olyphant	A Perfect Getaway	Nick	

=== 2010s ===
Year	Winner	Film	Role	Ref
2010	Armie Hammer	The Social Network	Cameron Winklevoss / Tyler Winklevoss	
2010	Christian Bale	The Fighter	Dicky Eklund	
2010	Geoffrey Rush	The King's Speech	Lionel Logue	
2011	Christopher Plummer	Beginners	Hal Fields	
2011	Albert Brooks	Drive	Bernie Rose	
2011	Patton Oswalt	Young Adult	Matt Freehauf	
2012	Philip Seymour Hoffman	The Master	Lancaster Dodd	
2012	Javier Bardem	Skyfall	Raoul Silva	
2012	Tommy Lee Jones	Lincoln	Thaddeus Stevens	
2013	Jared Leto	Dallas Buyers Club	Rayon	
2013	Michael Fassbender	12 Years a Slave	Edwin Epps	
2013	James Franco	Spring Breakers	Alien	
2014	J. K. Simmons	Whiplash	Terence Fletcher	
2014	Josh Brolin	Inherent Vice	Lt. Det. Christian "Bigfoot" Bjornsen	
2014	Edward Norton	Birdman or (The Unexpected Virtue of Ignorance)	Mike Shiner	
2015	Mark Rylance	Bridge of Spies	Rudolf Abel	
2015	Benicio del Toro	Sicario	Alejandro Gillick	
2015	Michael Shannon	99 Homes	Rick Carver	
2016	Mahershala Ali	Moonlight	Juan	
2016	Ralph Fiennes	A Bigger Splash	Harry Hawkes	
2016	Michael Shannon	Nocturnal Animals	Detective Bobby Andes	
2017	Willem Dafoe	The Florida Project	Bobby Hicks	
2017	Sam Rockwell	Three Billboards Outside Ebbing, Missouri	Officer Jason Dixon	
2017	Michael Stuhlbarg	Call Me by Your Name	Mr. Samuel Perlman	
2018	Steven Yeun	Burning	Ben	
2018	Richard E. Grant	Can You Ever Forgive Me?	Jack Hock	
2018	Michael B. Jordan	Black Panther	N'Jadaka / Erik "Killmonger" Stevens	
2019	Brad Pitt	Once Upon a Time in Hollywood	Cliff Booth	
2019	Willem Dafoe	The Lighthouse	Thomas Wake	
2019	Joe Pesci	The Irishman	Russell Bufalino	

=== 2020s ===
Year	Winner	Film	Role	Ref
2020	Daniel Kaluuya	Judas and the Black Messiah	Fred Hampton	
2020	Leslie Odom, Jr.	One Night in Miami...	Sam Cooke	
2020	Paul Raci	Sound of Metal	Joe	
2021	Bradley Cooper	Licorice Pizza	Jon Peters	
2021	Ciarán Hinds	Belfast	Pop	
2021	Kodi Smit-McPhee	The Power of the Dog	Peter Gordon	
2022	Ke Huy Quan	Everything Everywhere All at Once	Waymond Wang	
2022	Brendan Gleeson	The Banshees of Inisherin	Colm Doherty	
2022	Barry Keoghan	The Banshees of Inisherin	Dominic Kearney	
