= Toronto Film Critics Association Awards 2013 =

Annual Canadian film awards ceremony

17th Toronto Film Critics Association Awards
- Date: December 17, 2013

The 17th Toronto Film Critics Association Awards, honoring the best in film for 2013, were awarded on December 17, 2013. The award for Best Canadian Film was announced on January 7, 2014.

== Winners ==
Category	Winners and nominees	Films
Best Film	Joel Coen and Ethan Coen	Inside Llewyn Davis
Best Film	Spike Jonze	Her
Best Film	Steve McQueen	12 Years a Slave
Best Canadian Film	Jennifer Baichwal and Edward Burtynsky	Watermark
Best Canadian Film	Louise Archambault	Gabrielle
Best Canadian Film	Matt Johnson	The Dirties
Best Actor	Oscar Isaac	Inside Llewyn Davis
Best Actor	Matthew McConaughey	Dallas Buyers Club
Best Actor	Chiwetel Ejiofor	12 Years a Slave
Best Actress	Cate Blanchett	Blue Jasmine
Best Actress	Julie Delpy	Before Midnight
Best Actress	Greta Gerwig	Frances Ha
Best Supporting Actor	Jared Leto	Dallas Buyers Club
Best Supporting Actor	Michael Fassbender	12 Years a Slave
Best Supporting Actor	James Franco	Spring Breakers
Best Supporting Actress	Jennifer Lawrence	American Hustle
Best Supporting Actress	Lupita Nyong'o	12 Years a Slave
Best Supporting Actress	June Squibb	Nebraska
Best Director	Alfonso Cuaron	Gravity
Best Director	Joel Coen and Ethan Coen	Inside Llewyn Davis
Best Director	Steve McQueen	12 Years a Slave
Best Screenplay	Spike Jonze	Her
Best Screenplay	Richard Linklater, Ethan Hawke and Julie Delpy	Before Midnight
Best Screenplay	Joel Coen and Ethan Coen	Inside Llewyn Davis
Best First Feature	Kleber Mendonça Filho	Neighboring Sounds
Best First Feature	Ryan Coogler	Fruitvale Station
Best First Feature	Lake Bell	In a World...
Best Animated Feature	Hayao Miyazaki	The Wind Rises
Best Animated Feature	Kirk DeMicco and Chris Sanders	The Croods
Best Animated Feature	Chris Buck and Jennifer Lee	Frozen
Best Foreign-Language Film	Jia Zhangke	A Touch of Sin
Best Foreign-Language Film	Abdellatif Kechiche	Blue Is the Warmest Colour
Best Foreign-Language Film	Thomas Vinterberg	The Hunt
BMO Allan King Best Documentary	Joshua Oppenheimer	The Act of Killing
BMO Allan King Best Documentary	Lucien Castaing-Taylor and Véréna Paravel	Leviathan
BMO Allan King Best Documentary	Teller	Tim's Vermeer
