= Toronto Film Critics Association Awards 2005 =

Annual Canadian film awards ceremony

9th TFCA Awards

December 21, 2005

Best Film:
A History of Violence

The 9th Toronto Film Critics Association Awards, honoring the best in film for 2005, were given on 21 December 2005.

== Winners ==
- Best Actor:
  - Philip Seymour Hoffman – Capote
- Best Actress:
  - Laura Linney – The Squid and the Whale
- Best Animated Film:
  - Wallace & Gromit: The Curse of the Were-Rabbit
- Best Canadian Film:
  - A History of Violence
- Best Director:
  - David Cronenberg – A History of Violence
- Best Documentary Film:
  - Grizzly Man
- Best Film:
  - A History of Violence
- Best First Feature:
  - Capote
- Best Foreign Language Film:
  - The World • China/Japan/France
- Best Screenplay:
  - The Squid and the Whale – Noah Baumbach
- Best Supporting Actor:
  - Paul Giamatti – Cinderella Man
- Best Supporting Actress:
  - Catherine Keener – Capote

The TFCA has honoured Andy Serkis with a special citation for his work helping to realize the main character in King Kong.
