= Nicholas de Pencier =

Canadian cinematographer and filmmaker

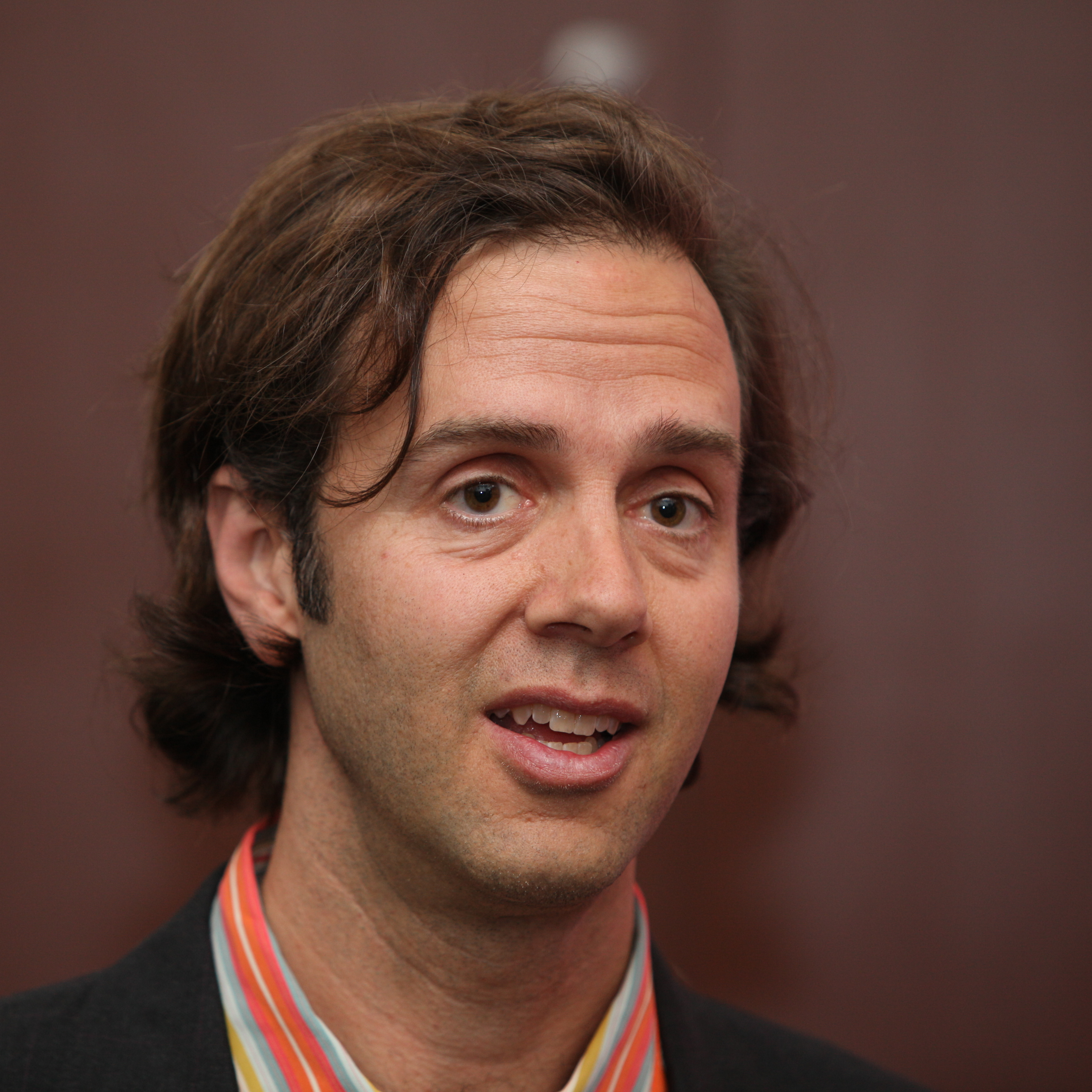
- Nicholas de Pencier at a screening of Act of God
- Occupation(s): Filmmaker, cinematographer
- Notable work: Manufactured Landscapes, Black Code, Long Time Running
- Spouse: Jennifer Baichwal
- Website: http://www.mercuryfilms.ca

Nicholas de Pencier is a Canadian cinematographer and filmmaker. The spouse and professional partner of filmmaker Jennifer Baichwal in Mercury Films, he is the cinematographer and producer on most of her films as well as codirector of the films Long Time Running. and Anthropocene: The Human Epoch. He was also solo director of the 2016 documentary Black Code.

He won a Genie Award in 2007, alongside Baichwal, Gerry Flahive, Daniel Iron and Peter Starr for Manufactured Landscapes and a Canadian Screen Award in 2011 alongside Baichwal, Iron and Edward Burtynsky for Watermark, and was an Emmy Award nominee for Outstanding Nature Programming in 2010 for "The Incredible Journey of the Butterflies", an episode of Nova.

In 2025, de Pencier and Baichwal worked with the indie rock band Rheostatics to create a multimedia video presentation for the band's concerts to promote their new album The Great Lakes Suite.

== Personal life ==
He is the son of magazine publisher Michael de Pencier, and the brother of film and television producer Miranda de Pencier.

== Filmography ==
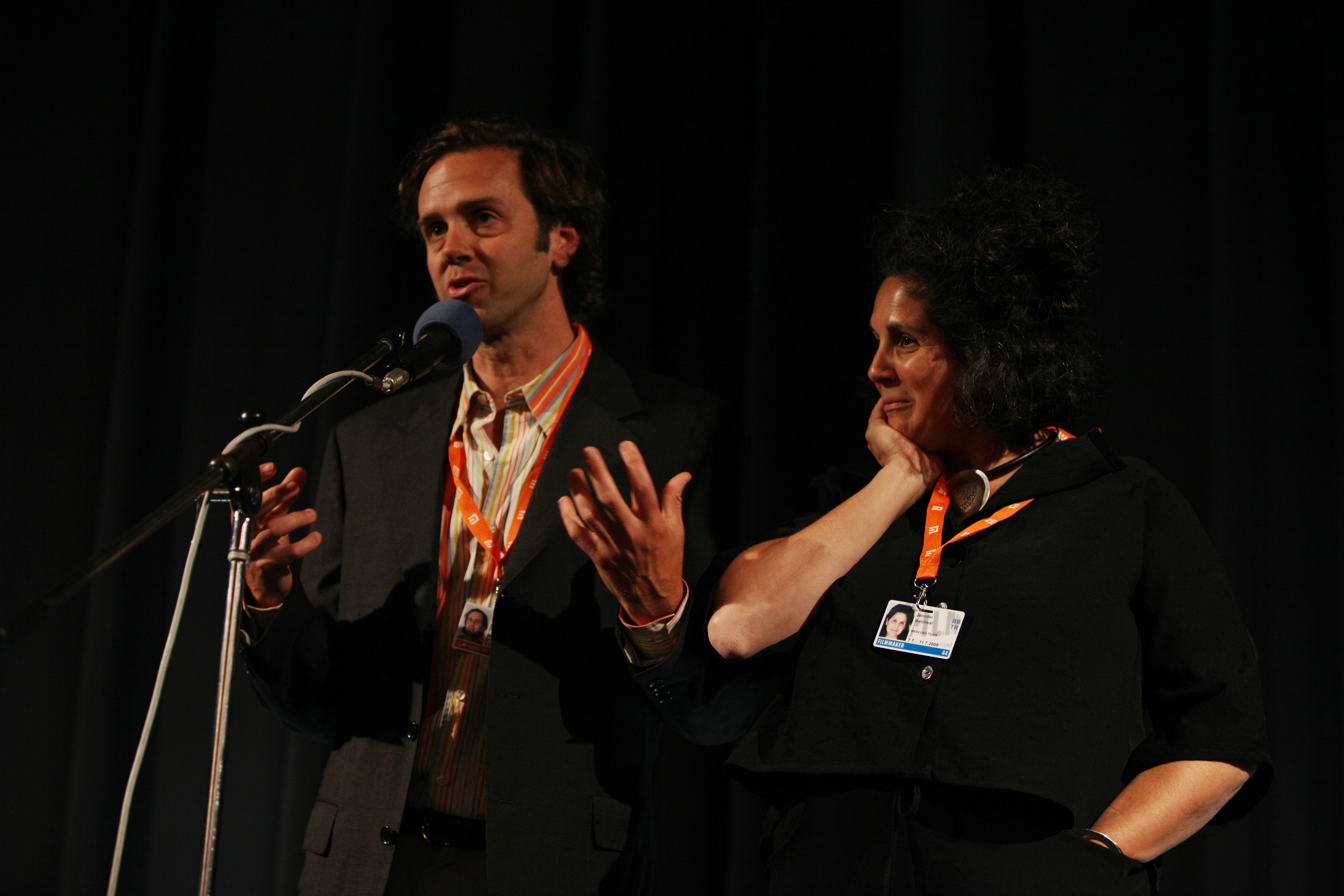
Nick de Pencier and director Jennifer Baichwal introducing Act of God at the 44th KVIFF

- Let It Come Down: The Life of Paul Bowles (1998) - cinematographer, producer
- The Uncles (2000) - producer
- The Holier It Gets (2000) - cinematographer, producer
- The True Meaning of Pictures: Shelby Lee Adams' Appalachia (2002) - cinematographer, producer
- Manufactured Landscapes (2006) - cinematographer, producer
- One Week (2008) - producer
- Act of God (2009) - cinematographer, producer
- Payback (2012) - cinematographer
- The End of Time (2012) - cinematographer
- Watermark (2013) - producer, cinematographer
- The Ghosts in Our Machine (2013) - cinematographer
- Al Purdy Was Here (2015) - cinematographer
- Black Code (2016) - director, producer
- Long Time Running (2017) - director, editor
- Anthropocene: The Human Epoch (2018) - director, producer, cinematographer
- Into the Weeds (2022) - producer, cinematographer
- The Colour of Ink (2022) - cinematographer
- An Optimist's Guide to the Planet (2024) - executive producer
