= Toronto Film Critics Association Awards 2004 =

Annual Canadian film awards ceremony

8th TFCA Awards

December 16, 2004

Best Film:
Sideways

The 8th Toronto Film Critics Association Awards, honoring the best in film for 2004, were held on 16 December 2004.

== Winners ==
- Best Actor:
  - Paul Giamatti – Sideways
- Best Actress:
  - Imelda Staunton – Vera Drake
- Best Animated Film:
  - The Triplets of Belleville
- Best Canadian Film:
  - The Triplets of Belleville
- Best Director:
  - Michel Gondry – Eternal Sunshine of the Spotless Mind
- Best Documentary Film:
  - The Fog of War
- Best Film:
  - Sideways
- Best First Feature:
  - Maria Full of Grace
- Best Foreign Language Film:
  - Hero • Hong Kong/China
- Best Screenplay:
  - Eternal Sunshine of the Spotless Mind – Charlie Kaufman
- Best Supporting Actor:
  - Clive Owen – Closer
- Best Supporting Actress:
  - Virginia Madsen – Sideways
