= Toronto Film Critics Association Awards 2010 =

Annual Canadian film awards ceremony

14th TFCA Awards

December 14, 2010

Best Film:
The Social Network

The 14th Toronto Film Critics Association Awards, honoring the best in film for 2010, were given on December 14, 2010.

== Winners ==
- Best Actor:
  - Jesse Eisenberg – The Social Network

Runners-Up: Colin Firth – The King's Speech and James Franco – 127 Hours

- Best Actress:
  - Jennifer Lawrence – Winter's Bone

Runners-Up: Natalie Portman – Black Swan and Michelle Williams – Blue Valentine

- Best Animated Film:
  - How to Train Your Dragon

Runners-Up: Despicable Me and Toy Story 3

- Best Director:
  - David Fincher – The Social Network

Runners-Up: Darren Aronofsky – Black Swan and Christopher Nolan – Inception

- Best Documentary Film:
  - Exit Through the Gift Shop

Runners-Up: Inside Job and Marwencol

- Best Film:
  - The Social Network

Runners-Up: Black Swan and Uncle Boonmee Who Can Recall His Past Lives

- Best First Feature:
  - Exit Through the Gift Shop

Runners-Up: Get Low and Monsters

- Best Foreign Language Film:
  - Uncle Boonmee Who Can Recall His Past Lives • Thailand

Runners-Up: Mother • South Korea and Of Gods and Men • France

- Best Screenplay:
  - The Social Network – Aaron Sorkin

Runners-Up: The King's Speech – David Seidler and True Grit – Joel and Ethan Coen

- Best Supporting Actor:
  - Armie Hammer – The Social Network

Runners-Up: Christian Bale – The Fighter and Geoffrey Rush – The King's Speech

- Best Supporting Actress:
  - Hailee Steinfeld – True Grit

Runners-Up: Amy Adams – The Fighter and Melissa Leo – The Fighter

- Jay Scott Prize for Emerging Talent:
  - Daniel Cockburn
- Special Citation:
  - to Bruce McDonald, who directed four movies in 2010: This Movie Is Broken, Trigger, Music from the Big House and Hard Core Logo 2
- Rogers Canadian Film Award:
  - Incendies

Runners-Up: Splice and Trigger
