= Toronto Film Critics Association Awards 2016 =

Annual Canadian film awards ceremony

20th Toronto Film Critics Association Awards
- Date: December 11, 2016

Highlights
- Best Picture: Moonlight

The 20th Toronto Film Critics Association Awards, honoring the best in film for 2016, were awarded on December 11, 2016, with the exception of the award for Best Canadian Film, which was presented on January 10, 2017.

The winner of the award for Best Canadian Film was Hugh Gibson for his documentary film The Stairs. Gibson received a prize of $100,000, with runners-up Kazik Radwanski and Matt Johnson each awarded $5,000. Unusually, however, the three directors revealed that they had agreed to pool the entire $110,000 in prize money, and split it equally among all three regardless of which film won.

== Winners ==
Category	Winners and nominees	Films
Best Film	Barry Jenkins	Moonlight
Best Film	Kenneth Lonergan	Manchester by the Sea
Best Film	Maren Ade	Toni Erdmann
Best Canadian Film	Hugh Gibson	The Stairs
Best Canadian Film	Kazik Radwanski	How Heavy This Hammer
Best Canadian Film	Matt Johnson	Operation Avalanche
Best Actor	Adam Driver	Paterson
Best Actor	Casey Affleck	Manchester by the Sea
Best Actor	Peter Simonischek	Toni Erdmann
Best Actress	Sandra Hüller	Toni Erdmann
Best Actress	Rebecca Hall	Christine
Best Actress	Isabelle Huppert	Elle
Best Actress	Natalie Portman	Jackie
Best Supporting Actor	Mahershala Ali	Moonlight
Best Supporting Actor	Ralph Fiennes	A Bigger Splash
Best Supporting Actor	Michael Shannon	Nocturnal Animals
Best Supporting Actress	Michelle Williams	Manchester by the Sea
Best Supporting Actress	Viola Davis	Fences
Best Supporting Actress	Naomie Harris	Moonlight
Best Director	Maren Ade	Toni Erdmann
Best Director	Damien Chazelle	La La Land
Best Director	Barry Jenkins	Moonlight
Best Screenplay	Kenneth Lonergan	Manchester by the Sea
Best Screenplay	Maren Ade	Toni Erdmann
Best Screenplay	Barry Jenkins	Moonlight
Best First Feature	Robert Eggers	The Witch
Best First Feature	Kelly Fremon Craig	The Edge of Seventeen
Best First Feature	Dan Kwan and Daniel Scheinert	Swiss Army Man
Best Animated Feature	Byron Howard and Rich Moore	Zootopia
Best Animated Feature	Michaël Dudok de Wit	The Red Turtle
Best Animated Feature	Travis Knight	Kubo and the Two Strings
Best Foreign-Language Film	Maren Ade	Toni Erdmann
Best Foreign-Language Film	Park Chan-wook	The Handmaiden
Best Foreign-Language Film	Paul Verhoeven	Elle
Best Documentary Film	Kirsten Johnson	Cameraperson
Best Documentary Film	Gianfranco Rosi	Fire at Sea
Best Documentary Film	Hugh Gibson	The Stairs
