= Mongrel Media =

Canadian film distribution company

- Type: Division
- Industry: Entertainment
- Founded: Toronto 1994; 32 years ago
- Founders: Hussain Amarshi
- Headquarters: Toronto, Ontario, Canada
- Key people: Hussain Amarshi (CEO)
- Products: Indie Film Motion Pictures
- Parent: Métropole Films Distribution
- Website: www.mongrelmedia.com

Mongrel Media is an independent Canadian film distribution company established in 1994 by Hussain Amarshi. It is the exclusive Canadian theatrical distributor for Sony Pictures Classics, and a selection of titles from Neon, A24, Amazon MGM Studios, Saban Films, Searchlight Pictures, and Independent Film Company. Mongrel Media is represented in Quebec by Métropole Films Distribution. In January 2014, it also acquired Canadian distribution rights to 300 film titles from the StudioCanal library.

In 2021, the company launched its own proprietary streaming service, offering a selection of films from both its catalogue and that of the American Magnolia Pictures library available from its website for a subscription fee of $6.99 per month.
