= Jennifer Baichwal =

Canadian documentary filmmaker

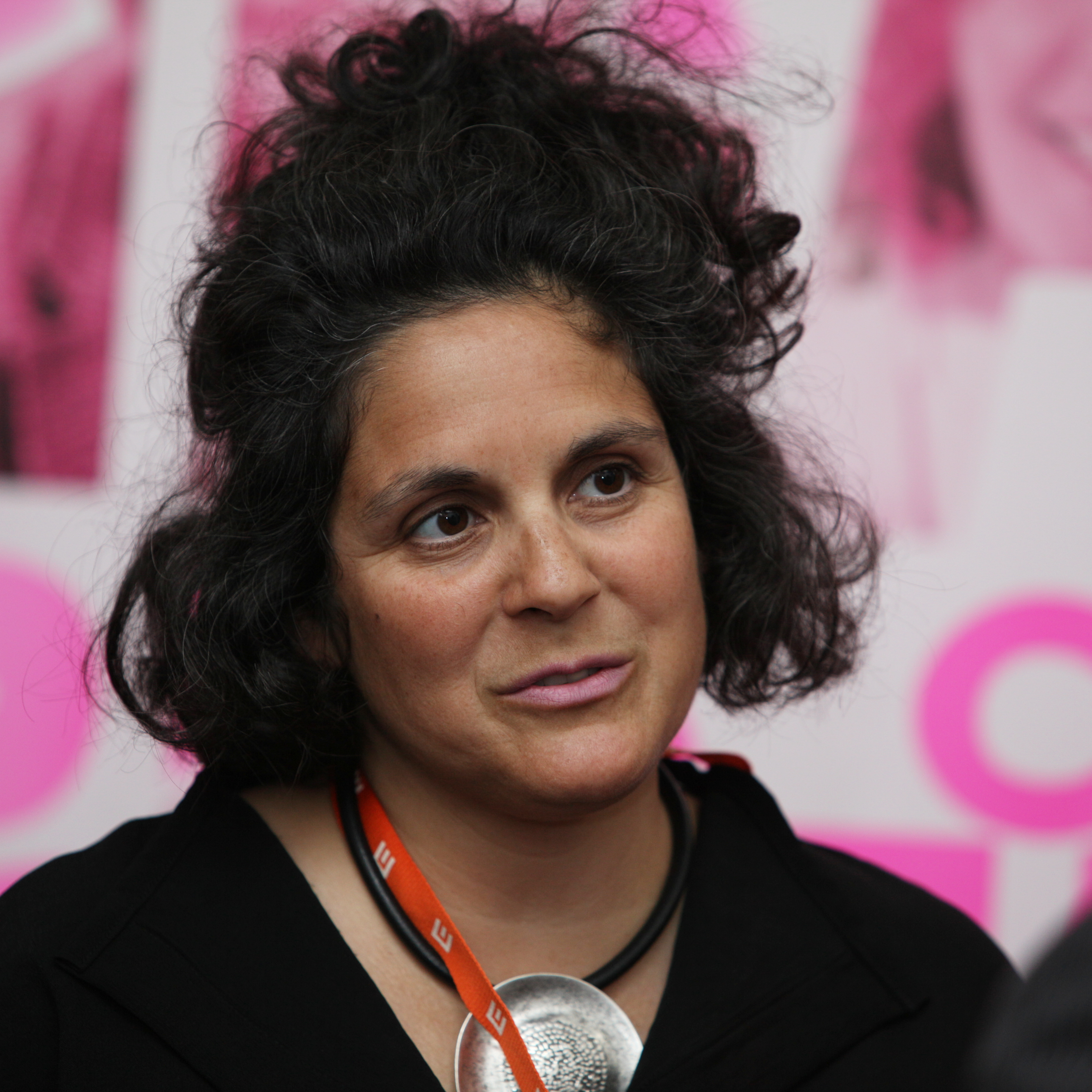
- Baichwal at the Karlovy Vary Film Festival, 2009
- Born: 1965 (age 60–61); Montreal, Quebec, Canada
- Occupation: Filmmaker
- Notable work: Manufactured Landscapes
- Spouse: Nicholas de Pencier
- Website: http://www.mercuryfilms.ca

Jennifer Baichwal is a Canadian documentary filmmaker, writer and producer.

== Biography ==
Baichwal was born in Montreal, Quebec and raised in Victoria, British Columbia. She is the daughter of Krishna Baichwal Sr. a cardiothoracic surgeon, and Elvina Baichwal. Together they had four children Jennifer, Krishna Jr., Elizabeth and Kristine. She is of Indian and British heritage. In 1985, she traveled to Morocco and lived on a farm, inspired by the writing of Paul Bowles, who would become the subject of her first feature-length documentary. Baichwal studied philosophy and theology at McGill University, writing her Master's thesis on Reinhold Niebuhr and receiving her master's in arts in 1994. In 1995, Baichwal traveled with her family to India to scatter the ashes of their late father who had died from heart-related issues.

Baichwal is married to cinematographer and director Nicholas de Pencier. They were brought together by Baichwal's classmate, Canadian journalist Evan Solomon, after he had suggested de Pencier when she needed a cinematographer for her film. Together, they have two children, a son Magnus born in 2000 and a daughter Anna born in 2003. The couple started a production company in 2000, originally under the name Requisite Productions, now called Mercury Films.

== Career ==
After completing her master's at McGill, Baichwal decided to pursue documentary film work as she found that it provided her the right avenue to explore the questions and issues that she had studied in her program. Baichwal on her career choice: "I wanted to explore these questions of the human condition, but in a medium that was more lateral and more emotionally accessible than an academic paper." She has stated that the documentary "allows you to reflect on ... things that are happening in the real world in a way that is creative". Her films often attempt to investigate problems within documentary film form. She says: "There has to be some kind of mystery as well - a meta-level problem that the film becomes a response to. Our Paul Bowles film is about the impossibility of biography. The Holier It Gets is about the perils of confessional work, and The True Meaning of Pictures is about issues of representation. Manufactured Landscapes, proceeding from Edward Burtynsky's photographs, is about changing consciousness through witnessing the places we are all responsible for, but normally never get to see."

Baichwal's production company has produced most of her films, along with other short films and documentaries including The Hockey Nomad and Black Code, the latter of which premiered at the Toronto International Film Festival in 2016.

Many of her films' subjects are artists of other mediums than film. In an interview with the Seventh Art, Baichwal mentions how she is drawn to artists, stating: "There is something about art that can't be paraphrased and just living in the complexity of that world is very rich for me..."

In 2016, Baichwal was named a member of the Toronto International Film Festival Board of Directors.

Since their initial collaboration in 1995 and with the exception of Manufactured Landscapes, all of Baichwal's films have been shot by her husband Nick de Pencier.

In 2025, de Pencier and Baichwal worked with the indie rock band Rheostatics to create a multimedia video presentation for the band's concerts to promote their new album The Great Lakes Suite.

=== Looking You in the Back of the Head (1997) ===
Looking You in the Back of the Head is a short television documentary produced in 1995 featuring 13 Canadian women exploring what they think of their own identity.

=== Let it Come Down: The Life of Paul Bowles (1998) ===
Let It Come Down: The Life of Paul Bowles is a documentary biography on the American writer Paul Bowles. Made near the end of Bowles' life, Baichwal was able to screen the film for the author before his death in 1999. She says of the experience viewing the film with her subject: "It was very important for me that he see [the film] before he died; he had just turned 88. I was petrified as to what he would think of it, he's a real misanthrope and recluse. I got to his place, and I wanted him to watch it after I left and then write to me. But he was insistent. So he put it on, and he has quite bad glaucoma, so he was sitting six inches from the screen. I shut the door, and I kind of panicked for 75 minutes while he was watching it."

=== The Holier It Gets (2000) ===
The Holier It Gets is a documentary about Baichwal and her siblings pilgrimage to India to put their father's ashes in the Ganges river. It was filmed on 16mm by Nick de Pencier. The film explores themes of grief, closure, the afterlife and spirituality.

=== The True Meaning of Pictures: Shelby Lee Adams' Appalachia (2002) ===
The True Meaning of Pictures: Shelby Lee Adams' Appalachia is a documentary on the work of renowned and controversial American photographer Shelby Lee Adams. The film takes a layered approach to Adams' work, it features interviews with the photographer, his subjects and his critics. The film's title comes from one of Adam's subjects and defenders in the face of accusations of exploitation and stereotypes from the photographer.

=== Manufactured Landscapes (2006) ===
Notable amongst Baichwal's features, the documentary Manufactured Landscapes focuses on the work of Canadian photographer Edward Burtynsky in one of his expeditions to China. The photographs, taken for his China series, provide the frame for the film that explores the effects that rapid and recent industrialization has had on the environment in this manufacturing and economic superpower.

=== Act of God (2009) ===
Act of God is a documentary about the metaphysical questions surrounding the event of being struck by lightning. It features various accounts from people who have either been struck lightning or witnessed the act. It looks into scientific, cultural and religious interpretations of lightning showers from around the world. The film features narration from writer Paul Auster and centers his experience witnessing his childhood friend succumb to a fatal lightning strike.

=== Payback (2012) ===
Payback is a documentary film adaptation of Canadian writer Margaret Atwood's non-fiction book Payback: Debt and the Shadow Side of Wealth.

=== Watermark (2013) ===
Watermark, the second collaboration between Baichwal and Burtynsky, sees the photographer co-directing the film alongside her. The documentary looks into the abuse of water, its effect and the dependence as water as a source of life. The film is accompanied by Burtynsky's series titled Water which he produced while filming the documentary.

=== Long Time Running (2017) ===
Baichwal and de Pencier directed The Tragically Hip documentary Long Time Running, documenting the 2016 farewell tour of the Canadian band following lead singer Gord Downie's diagnosis of terminal brain cancer. It was released in 2017.

=== Anthropocene (2018) ===
Anthropocene: The Human Epoch is Baichwal's third collaboration with Burtynsky. The documentary explores humanity's aggregate impacts on the natural world, and whether they justify the creation of a new geologic epoch, equivalent to the Holocene or Pleistocene. It was released in September, 2018.

== Filmography ==
- Looking You in the Back of the Head (1997)
- Let It Come Down: The Life of Paul Bowles (1998)
- The Holier It Gets (2000)
- The True Meaning of Pictures: Shelby Lee Adams' Appalachia (2002)
- Manufactured Landscapes (2006)
- Act of God (2009)
- Payback (2012)
- Watermark (co-directed with Edward Burtynsky) (2013)
- Long Time Running (2017)
- Anthropocene: The Human Epoch (2018)
- Into the Weeds (2022)
- An Optimist's Guide to the Planet (2024, executive producer)
- The Sandbox (2026, executive producer)

== Awards and nominations ==
Year	Award	Category	Title	Result
1998	Genie Award	Best Feature Length Documentary	Let it Come Down: The Life of Paul Bowles	Nominated
1999	Hot Docs	Best Biography	Let it Come Down: The Life of Paul Bowles	Won
1999	International Emmy Award	Best Arts Documentary	Let it Come Down: The Life of Paul Bowles	Won
2000	Hot Docs	Best Independent Canadian Film	The Holier It Gets	Won
2000	Hot Docs	Best Cultural Documentary	The Holier It Gets	Won
2000	Gemini Award	Best Writing in a Documentary Program or Series	The Holier It Gets	Won
2000	Gemini Award	Best Editing	The Holier It Gets	Won
2000	Gemini Award	Donald Brittain Award for Best Social/Political Documentary Program	The Holier It Gets	Nominated
2003	Gemini Awards	Best Arts Documentary Program or Series	The True Meaning of Pictures: Shelby Lee Adams' Appalachia	Won
2003	Gemini Award	Best Direction in a Documentary Program	The True Meaning of Pictures: Shelby Lee Adams' Appalachia	Nominated
2006	Genie Award	Best Documentary	Manufactured Landscapes	Won
2006	Toronto Film Critics Association	Rogers Best Canadian Film Award	Manufactured Landscapes	Won
2006	Toronto International Film Festival	Best Canadian Film Feature	Manufactured Landscapes	Won
2006	Gemini Award	Best Direction in a Performing Arts Program or Series	OAC Compendium	Nominated
2013	Toronto Film Critics Association	Rogers Best Canadian Film Award	Watermark	Won
2014	Canadian Screen Award	Ted Rogers Best Feature Length Documentary	Watermark	Won
