= Love Is Everything: The Jane Siberry Anthology =

Compilation album by Jane Siberry
- Released: 16 April 2002
- Recorded: 1980–2001
- Genre: Rock
- Label: Rhino Records
- Producer: Hillary Bratton (anthology); Jane Siberry, John Switzer, Brian Eno, Jon Goldsmith, Michael Brook (tracks)

Jane Siberry chronology
City (2001)	Love Is Everything: The Jane Siberry Anthology (2002)	Shushan the Palace: Hymns of Earth (2003)

Professional ratings
Review scores
Source	Rating
Allmusic	link

Love Is Everything: The Jane Siberry Anthology is a two-disc compilation of songs by the Canadian singer-songwriter Jane Siberry. It was released in 2002 and contains material dating back to her debut release in 1981.

There are also two new tracks; "Are You Burning, Little Candle?" was originally only available on a rare CD single, while "Map of the World (Part IV): Pilgrim" extends the series of "Map" songs appearing on earlier albums.

The set also includes a booklet containing Siberry's reflections on the songs and a biography.

All tracks were digitally remastered.

== Track listing ==
Disc one

1. "In The Blue Light"
2. "Bessie"
3. "The Mystery at Ogwen's Farm"
4. "You Don't Need"
5. "The Taxi Ride"
6. "One More Colour"
7. "The Walking (And Constantly)"
8. "Red High Heels"
9. "The Lobby"
10. "Bound by the Beauty"
11. "Everything Reminds Me of My Dog"
12. "The Life Is the Red Wagon"
13. "Calling All Angels"
14. "Love Is Everything"
15. "Sail Across the Water"

Disc two

1. "Temple"
2. "Goodbye Sweet Pumpkinhead"
3. "Maria"
4. "The Squirrel Crossed the Road"
5. "Peony"
6. "Mimi on the Beach"
7. "Mimi Speaks"
8. "Barkis Is Willin'"
9. "Are You Burning, Little Candle?"
10. "All Through the Night"
11. "The Water Is Wide"
12. "Map of the World (Part I)"
13. "Map of the World (Part II)"
14. "Map of the World (Part III): Are We Dancing Now?"
15. "Map of the World (Part IV): Pilgrim"

== Personnel ==
- Jane Siberry – Organ, Synthesizer, Bells, Vocals, Organ (Hammond), Piano, Keyboards, Harp, Accordion, Guitar, Harmonica, Percussion Sampling, Loops, producer,
- John Switzer – Bass, Vocals, Percussion, producer
- Brian Eno – Oboe, Organ (Hammond), Shaker, Tambo Drums, Guitar Effects, producer
- Jon Goldsmith – Keyboards, producer
- Michael Brook – Guitar, producer, Mixing
- Ken Myhr – Dulcimer, Guitar, Guitar Synth, Percussion, Vocals
- Tim Ray – Organ, Piano
- Doug Wilde – Keyboards
- Rob Yale – Keyboards, Fairlight
- Teddy Borowiecki – Percussion, Accordion, Piano
- Anne Bourne – Keyboards, Vocals
- Jamie West-Oram – Guitar
- Larry Baeder – Guitar
- Debbie Knapper – Guitar
- Bryant Didier – Bass
- Christopher Thomas – Bass
- Gail Ann Dorsey – Bass, Vocals
- Ben Mink – Viola
- Sandy Baron – Violin
- Alex McMaster – Strings
- Sarah McElcheran – Trumpet
- David Travers-Smith – Trumpet, Live Mixing, Live Recording, Mixing, engineer, Sampling
- Steven Donald – Trombone
- Jennifer Weeks – Oboe
- Dave Houghton – Drums
- Glenn Milchem – Drums
- James Pinker – Drums
- Dean Sharp – Drums
- Stich Wynston – Drums
- Brian Blade – Drums
- Al Cross – Percussion, Drums, Linn Drum
- Ian McLauchlan – Percussion
- Rebecca Jenkins – Vocals
- k.d. lang – Vocals
- Christopher Rouse – Vocals
- David Ramsden – Vocals
- Catherine Russell – Vocals
- Gina Stepaniuk – Vocals
- Cherie Camp – Vocals
- Rebecca Campbell – Vocals
- Lisa Lindo – Vocals
- Quisha Wint – Vocals

== Other credits ==
- Hillary Bratton – Compilation Producer
- Dan Hersch – Remastering
- Bill Inglot – Remastering
- Kerry Crawford – Producer
- John Naslen – Producer, engineer
- David Bradstreet – Producer, engineer
- Carl Keesee – Producer, engineer
- Kevin Killen – Mixing
- Chad Irschick – Mixing
- Jim Zolis – Engineer, Mixing
- Michael Phillip Wojewoda – Engineer, Mixing
- Rick Starks – Engineer
- Jeff Wolpert – Engineer
- Gary Furniss – Engineer
- David Ferri – Engineer
- Ron Searles – Engineer
- George Rondina – Engineer
- Maria Villar – Art Direction, Design
- Andrew MacNaughtan – Artwork, Photography
- Chris Taylor – Photography
- Mark Abrahms – Photography
- Floria Sigismondi – Cover Photography
- Michiko Suzuki – Photography
- Frank W. Ockenfels – Photography
- Emily Cagan – Product Manager
- Steven Chean – Editorial Supervision
- Gary Peterson – Discographical Annotation
- Malia Doss – Licensing
- Gladys Sanchez – Licensing
- Randy Perry – Project Assistant
- Amy Utstein – Project Assistant
- Leigh Hall – Project Assistant, A&R
- Karen Ahmed – A&R
