= A Collection 1984–1989 =

Greatest hits album by Jane Siberry
- Released: March 7, 1995
- Recorded: 1984–1989
- Genre: Rock
- Length: 70:45
- Label: Duke Street
- Producer: Jane Siberry, Kerry Crawford, Jon Goldsmith, John Switzer

Jane Siberry chronology
When I Was a Boy (1993)	A Collection 1984–1989 (1995)	Maria (1995)

Professional ratings
Review scores
Source	Rating
Allmusic	4.5/5 stars

A Collection 1984–1989 is a 1995 greatest hits compilation of her by Jane Siberry.

== Released ==
It was released in Canada and the United States. Later that year, the compilation Summer in the Yukon was released in the United Kingdom.

== Track listing ==
Source: Discogs; Amazon

All tracks are written by Jane Siberry

No.	Title	Original Album and year	Length
1.	"I Muse Aloud"	No Borders Here, 1984	4:14
2.	"Mimi on the Beach"	No Borders Here, 1984	7:37
3.	"The Waitress"	No Borders Here, 1984	2:26
4.	"You Don't Need"	No Borders Here, 1984	4:27
5.	"One More Colour"	The Speckless Sky, 1985	4:39
6.	"Map of the World, Pt. 2"	The Speckless Sky, 1985	5:08
7.	"The Taxi Ride"	The Speckless Sky, 1985	5:41
8.	"Seven Steps to the Wall"	The Speckless Sky, 1985	5:14
9.	"The Walking (and Constantly)"	The Walking, 1988	6:13
10.	"Red High Heels"	The Walking, 1988	7:19
11.	"Ingrid and the Footman"	The Walking, 1988	7:03
12.	"The Life Is the Red Wagon"	Bound by the Beauty, 1989	4:16
13.	"Miss Punta Blanca"	Bound by the Beauty, 1989	1:40
14.	"Bound By the Beauty"	Bound by the Beauty, 1989	4:42
