= Summer in the Yukon =

Greatest hits album by Jane Siberry
- Released: 1992
- Recorded: 1980–1992
- Length: 67:16
- Label: Reprise
- Producer: Jane Siberry et al.

Professional ratings
Review scores
Source	Rating
AllMusic	4.5/5 stars

Summer in the Yukon is a 1992 compilation album by Jane Siberry. It was released only in the United Kingdom.

In Canada, the compilation A Collection 1984-1989 was released instead. That album contains some of the same songs, but includes other songs not appearing on Summer in the Yukon.

Conversely, Summer in the Yukon includes tracks not appearing on the Canadian compilation, including two tracks from Siberry's 1981 self-titled debut and her most famous song, "Calling All Angels". That song, a duet with k.d. lang which was recorded for the soundtrack to Wim Wenders' Until the End of the World, had not yet been included on an album of new material by Siberry. It subsequently appeared on her 1993 album When I Was a Boy, and later appeared on a second film soundtrack, Pay It Forward. The version of "The Life Is The Red Wagon" is the single version, whereas A Collection 1984-1989 features the more stripped-down album version.

== Track listing ==
No.	Title	Length
1.	"The Life Is the Red Wagon"	4:16
2.	"Miss Punta Blanca"	1:40
3.	"Calling All Angels"	5:17
4.	"Above the Tree Line"	4:26
5.	"In the Blue Light"	4:19
6.	"Seven Steps to the Wall"	5:14
7.	"Mimi on the Beach"	7:37
8.	"The Walking (and Constantly)"	6:13
9.	"The Very Large Hat"	5:35
10.	"The Lobby"	6:19
11.	"Red High Heels"	7:19
12.	"Map of the World (Part II)"	5:08
13.	"The Taxi Ride"	5:41

== Credits ==
- All music and lyrics by Jane Siberry.
- All tracks produced by Jane Siberry and John Switzer, except track 3 Jane Siberry, 4 and 5 Jane Siberry/David Bradstreet/Carl Keesee, and 7 Jane Siberry/John Switzer/Jonathan Goldsmith/Kerry Crawford. Additional production on track 1 by Botany John.
- Tracks 6–13 engineered and co-produced by John Naslen.
- Mixed by Greg Jackman.
