= When I Was a Boy =

Studio album by Jane Siberry
- Released: August 3, 1993
- Recorded: June 1991–January 1993; Mushroom Studios, Vancouver; Reaction Studios, Toronto; Westside Studios, London
- Genre: Ambient; Synthpop; Downtempo
- Length: 66:23
- Label: Reprise/Warner Bros. Records; 26824
- Producer: Jane Siberry, Brian Eno (tracks 1 and 4), Michael Brook (track 3)

Jane Siberry chronology
Bound by the Beauty (1989)	When I Was a Boy (1993)	Maria (1995)

Professional ratings
Review scores
Source	Rating
AllMusic	4/5 stars
Chicago Tribune	3.5/4 stars
The Philadelphia Inquirer	3.5/4 stars
Q	4/5 stars
Rolling Stone	4/5 stars
The Village Voice	B−

When I Was a Boy is a 1993 album by Jane Siberry. Internationally, it is her most famous album. In Siberry's native Canada, however, the album was commercially successful but not as big a hit as her 1985 album The Speckless Sky.

The album includes Siberry's most famous song, "Calling All Angels", a duet with k.d. lang which appeared on two movie soundtracks, Until the End of the World in 1991 and Pay It Forward in 2000. The song was also sung by cast members of Six Feet Under in a scene from the episode "The Rainbow of Her Reasons." "Sail Across the Water" and "Temple" were the other singles from the album.

Several songs included electronic textures; "Temple" was Siberry's first song that was popular in dance clubs. The album was also Siberry's first to explore more spiritual themes, which would become a hallmark of her later music.

On The Tragically Hip's 1997 live album Live Between Us, Gordon Downie sings the chorus from "Temple" in that album's track "Nautical Disaster".

== Track listing ==
All songs written by Jane Siberry, except where indicated.

1. "Temple" – 4:45
2. "Calling All Angels" – 5:17
3. "Love Is Everything" – 5:50
4. "Sail Across the Water" – 5:22
5. "All the Candles in the World" – 3:49
6. "Sweet Incarnadine" (Siberry, Erdal Kızılçay, Ken Myhr) – 6:46
7. "The Gospel According to Darkness" – 4:51
8. "An Angel Stepped Down (And Slowly Looked Around)" – 5:50
9. "The Vigil (The Sea)" – 9:23
10. "Bells" – 1:19
11. "At the Beginning of Time" – 8:20
12. "Love Is Everything" (Harmony Version) – 5:51

== Personnel ==
- Jane Siberry – guitar, piano, keyboards, organ, vocals, backing vocals
- Ken Myhr – guitar, vocals on 7 8, percussion on 11

=== Additional personnel ===
- Brian Eno – shaker on 1, oboe on 1, synthesizer on 4
- Teddy Borowiecki – piano on 2
- Glenn Milchem – drums on 1
- David Ramsden – vocals on 1 7 8 11
- James Pinker – drums on 1 4
- Bryant Didier – bass on 1
- Jamie West-Oram – guitar on 1
- k.d. lang – vocals on 2
- Ben Mink – viola on 2
- Michael Brook – guitar on 3, infinite guitar on 3
- Sid Wells – drum loops on 5 8
- Robert Ahwai – bass on 5 7 8
- Erdal Kızılçay – piano on 6
- Holly Cole – vocals on 7 8
- Rebecca Jenkins – vocals on 7 8 9
- Michael Phillip-Wojewoda – vocals on 7 8, percussion on 11
- Anne Bourne – cello on 7 8 9
- Graham Dickson – drum loops on 7
- Rebecca Campbell – vocals on 8
- Andy Stochansky – vocals on 11
- John Switzer – bass on 9
- Paul Douglas – vocals on 9

== Charts ==
Album

Year	Chart	Peak position	Weeks on the chart
1993	RPM Top 100 Albums	46	13

Singles

Song	Year	Chart	Peak position
"Calling All Angels"	1992	RPM Adult Contemporary	9
"Sail Across the Water"	1993	RPM Top 100 Singles	66

== Other appearances in popular media ==
The song "All the Candles in the World" is featured in the 2000 movie Final Destination.

The final track, "Love Is Everything (Harmony Version)", is featured as the closing track of the episode titled "Loud and Proud" (S02E11) of Showtime series The L Word.

"Calling All Angels" is featured on the season one finale, "Déjà Vu All Over Again", of The WB series Charmed.
