= Shushan the Palace: Hymns of Earth =

Studio album by Jane Siberry
- Released: 2003

Jane Siberry chronology
| Love is Everything: The Jane Siberry Anthology (2002) | Shushan the Palace: Hymns of Earth (2003) | Dragon Dreams (2008) |

Shushan the Palace: Hymns of Earth is a 2003 album by Jane Siberry.

It is her third Christmas-themed album, following 1994's Count Your Blessings, a live concert she performed with Holly Cole, Rebecca Jenkins, Mary Margaret O'Hara and Victoria Williams, and 1997's Child: Music for the Christmas Season.

On Shushan the Palace, Siberry interprets several Christmas liturgical hymns by classical composers.

It was rated 3.5 stars by AllMusic.

== Track listing ==
1. "How Beautiful Are the Feet" – 3:35 - George Frideric Handel/Charles Jennens
2. "Sheep May Safely Graze" – 3:43 - Johann Sebastian Bach/Salomo Franck
3. "A Star Shall Rise Up Out of Jacob" – 1:39 - Felix Mendelssohn/J. F. Von Bunsen
4. "I Know That My Redeemer Liveth" – 6:07 - George Frideric Handel/Charles Jennens
5. "Lo, How a Rose E'er Blooming" – 4:49 - Friedrich Layritz/John C. Mattes/Krauth Spaeth
6. "In the Bleak Midwinter" – 4:19 - Gustav Holst/Christina Rossetti
7. "Jesus Christ the Apple Tree" – 3:05 - lyric collected by Joshua Smith, music by Elizabeth Poston
8. "Break Forth, O Beauteous Heavenly Light" – 4:48 - Johann Rist/Johann Schop
9. "If God Be for Us" – 4:22 - Handel/Jennens with additional lyrics by Peter Kiesewalter

== See also ==
- Shushan Palace
