= Maria (Jane Siberry album) =

Studio album by Jane Siberry
- Released: August 22, 1995
- Recorded: September 1994 – April 1995 at Reaction Studios, Toronto
- Genre: Adult alternative, jazz
- Length: 66:56
- Label: Reprise
- Producer: Jane Siberry

Jane Siberry chronology
When I Was a Boy (1993)	Maria (1995)	Teenager (1996)

Maria is a 1995 album by Canadian singer and songwriter Jane Siberry. It was her first album not to include any musical contributions from longtime collaborators such as Ken Myhr and Rebecca Jenkins.

== Information ==
The album ends with "Oh My My," a 20 minute-plus ode that gathers the themes from the entire album. Rolling Stone wrote: "[I]n this heap of Siberjazz you realize that everything that has arisen on Maria has indeed converged and that you've actually been led on an unforgettable walk in a garden facing fall with a tour guide who's sure-footed in her wobbly pace. Awesome."

Maria was her last major label album. In 1996, Siberry started her own independent record label, Sheeba Records, and has released all of her subsequent recordings on that imprint.

== Reception ==
Professional ratings
Review scores
Source	Rating
AllMusic	3/5 stars
The Phoenix	3.5/5 stars
Rolling Stone	4/5 stars

Rolling Stone wrote about Maria: "[H]ot damn, the girl's back in the driver's seat with Maria...This is vintage Siberry: scissor-kicking around the soul's messiest spots in search of anything hinting toward redemption... That's exactly what this album's about: the pull of life. Not specifically the good or the bad or the ugly but just the pull and the subsequent release."

== Track listing ==
All songs by Siberry, except "Would You Go?" by Siberry and Tim Ray.

1. "Maria" (4:25)
2. "See the Child" (6:24)
3. "Honey Bee (the speed of the...)" (4:17)
4. "Caravan" (7:30)
5. "Lovin' Cup (Song to Life)" (3:39)
6. "Begat Begat (Spring is Coming)" (6:33)
7. "Goodbye Sweet Pumpkinhead" (4:35)
8. "Would You Go? (there's a hole in the roof where the rain comes in)" (7:20)
9. "Mary Had (a little lamb)" (1:58)
10. "Oh My My" (20:15)

== Personnel ==
- Jane Siberry - vocals, guitar, lyrics, producer

with

- Tim Ray - piano
- Brian Blade - drums
- Christopher Thomas - double bass
- David Travers-Smith - trumpet
- Ian McLauchlan - percussion
- Ritesh Das - tabla
- George Koller - sitar, esraj
- Cullen Singers

and

- David Travers-Smith - recording engineer
- Jeff Elliot - assistant engineer
- Ormond Jobim - co-engineer
- Michael Brooke - mixes
- Gregory Calbi - mastering
- Frank Ockenfels 3 - colour photos
- Trevor Hughes - studio photos
- Say-Lay-Pho - artwork design
- Wyatt Mitchell - design co-ordination
