= Map of the World (Part II) =

Single by Jane Siberry

from the album The Speckless Sky
- B-side: "The Taxi Ride"
- Released: 1985
- Genre: Art pop, synthpop
- Length: 5:07
- Label: Duke Street
- Songwriter: Jane Siberry
- Producers: John Naslen, Jane Siberry, John Switzer

Jane Siberry singles chronology
"One More Colour" (1985)	"Map of the World (Part II)" (1985)	"Calling All Angels" (1991)

"Map of the World (Part II)" is a song by the Canadian singer-songwriter Jane Siberry. It is the second single released in support of her third album The Speckless Sky, issued in 1985.

== Formats and track listing ==
All songs written by Jane Siberry.

Canadian 7" single (DSR 81019)

1. "Map of the World (Part II)" – 5:07
2. "The Empty City" – 4:20

US 7" single (OS-0021)

1. "Map of the World (Part II)" (edit) – 3:59
2. "The Taxi Ride" – 5:38

US 12" single (OA-17415)

1. "Map of the World (Part II)" (edit) – 3:59
2. "Seven Steps to the Wall" – 5:11
3. "The Taxi Ride" – 5:38

== Charts ==
Chart (1986)	Peak position
Canada Adult Contemporary (RPM)	17

== Personnel ==
Adapted from the Map of the World (Part II) liner notes.

- Jane Siberry – vocals, guitar, keyboards, production

Musicians

- Anne Bourne – keyboards
- Al Cross – drums
- Ken Myhr – guitar, guitar synthesizer
- John Switzer – bass, production
- Rob Yale – Fairlight CMI, keyboards

Production and additional personnel

- John Naslen – production, engineering

== Release history ==
Region	Date	Label	Format	Catalog
Canada	1985	Duke	LP	DSR 81019
United States	1985	Open Air	LP	OS-0021
