= One More Colour =

Single by Jane Siberry

from the album The Speckless Sky
- B-side: "The Empty City"
- Released: 1985
- Genre: Art pop, synthpop
- Length: 4:30
- Label: Duke
- Songwriter: Jane Siberry
- Producers: John Naslen, Jane Siberry, John Switzer

Jane Siberry singles chronology
"Mimi on the Beach" (1984)	"One More Colour" (1985)	"Map of the World (Part II)" (1985)

"One More Colour" is a song by the Canadian singer-songwriter Jane Siberry. It is the first single released in support of her third album The Speckless Sky, issued in 1985.

Composer Mychael Danna later rearranged the song for the 1997 film The Sweet Hereafter, where it is performed by Sarah Polley.

It was covered by Rheostatics on their 1994 album Introducing Happiness.

== Formats and track listing ==
All songs written by Jane Siberry.

Canadian 7" single (DSR 71019)

1. "One More Colour" – 4:30
2. "The Empty City" – 6:42

== Charts ==
Chart (1985)	Peak position
Canada Top Singles (RPM)	27

== Personnel ==
Adapted from the One More Colour liner notes.

- Jane Siberry – vocals, guitar, keyboards, production

Musicians

- Anne Bourne – keyboards
- Al Cross – drums
- Ken Myhr – guitar, guitar synthesizer
- John Switzer – bass, production
- Rob Yale – Fairlight CMI, keyboards

Production and additional personnel

- John Naslen – production, engineering

== Release history ==
Region	Date	Label	Format	Catalog
Canada	1985	Duke	LP	DSR 71019
United States	1985	Open Air	LP	OS-0017
