= Mimi on the Beach =

Single by Jane Siberry

from the album No Borders Here
- B-side: "Dancing Class"
- Released: 1984
- Recorded: 1983 – 1984
- Genre: Art pop, new wave
- Length: 7:35
- Label: Duke
- Songwriter: Jane Siberry
- Producers: Kerry Crawford, Jon Goldsmith, Jane Siberry, John Switzer

Jane Siberry singles chronology
"Mimi on the Beach" (1984)	"One More Colour" (1985)

"Mimi on the Beach" is a song by the Canadian singer-songwriter Jane Siberry. It is the only single released in support of her second album No Borders Here, and was first issued in 1984.

A video for the song received airplay on MuchMusic in Canada. It was directed by Richard Oleksiak, father of Canadian Olympic swimmer Penny Oleksiak and NHL defenseman Jamie Oleksiak.

== Formats and track listing ==
All songs written by Jane Siberry.

Canadian 7" single (DSR 91007)

1. "Mimi on the Beach" – 3:21
2. "Dancing Class" – 6:45

Netherlands 7" single (RR 5509)

1. "Mimi on the Beach" – 4:46
2. "Extra Executives" – 4:25

Canadian 12" single (DSR 12018)

1. "Mimi on the Beach" (extended version) – 7:35
2. "Mimi on the Beach" – 4:46
3. "You Don't Need" – 4:25

== Charts ==
Chart (1984)	Peak position
Canada Top Singles (RPM)	68

== Personnel ==
Adapted from the Mimi on the Beach liner notes.

- Jane Siberry – vocals, guitar, keyboards, production

Musicians

- Al Cross – drums, percussion, LinnDrum
- Ken Myhr – guitar, percussion
- John Switzer – bass, percussion, production
- Doug Wilde – keyboards
- Rob Yale – Fairlight CMI

Production and additional personnel

- Mark Baldi – assistant engineering
- Kerry Crawford – production
- Jon Goldsmith – production, keyboards
- Bernie Grundman – mastering
- John Naslen – engineering
- Ron Seales – assistant engineering
- Rick Starks – assistant engineering
- France Tetreault – assistant engineering
- Jeff Wolpert – engineering

== Release history ==
Region	Date	Label	Format	Catalog
Canada	1984	Duke	LP	DSR 91007
Canada	1984	Duke	LP	DSR 12018
Canada	1985	Duke	LP	DSR 81007
Netherlands	1985	Roadrunner	LP	RR 5509
