= Bound by the Beauty =

Bound By the Beauty

Studio album by Jane Siberry
- Released: September 12, 1989
- Recorded: 1989
- Genre: Art pop, folk pop, soft rock
- Length: 42:39
- Label: Duke Street Records/Reprise Records
- Producer: Jane Siberry and John Switzer

Jane Siberry chronology
The Walking (1988)	Bound By the Beauty (1989)	When I Was a Boy (1993)

Professional ratings
Review scores
Source	Rating
Allmusic	3/5 stars

Bound By the Beauty is a 1989 album by Jane Siberry. It received better reviews than her previous album, The Walking, and the title track received more extensive radio airplay than Siberry had seen since "One More Colour" in 1985.

The track "Half Angel Half Eagle" was controversial. Siberry used the images of an angel and an eagle soaring over a city to depict a view of both the beauty and the ugliness of city life; the ugliness was apparent in the lyric "fucking honky nigger Jew/WASP Jap dago fag/fucking homeless preacher dyke/cabbie fucking union scab". Siberry was commenting on the prevalence of this type of offensive language on the streets of a big city.

The track "The Valley" was played during the funeral service for John Balance.

"Something About Trains" also appeared (as "This Old Earth") on The Top of His Head, the soundtrack to Peter Mettler's film The Top of His Head; the song was a Genie Award nominee for Best Original Song at the 11th Genie Awards in 1990.

Mettler also took the album's cover photograph.

== Track listing ==
All tracks written by Jane Siberry.

1. "Bound by the Beauty" – 4:41
2. "Something About Trains" – 3:44
3. "Hockey" – 3:58
4. "Everything Reminds Me of My Dog" – 4:17
5. "The Valley" – 6:04
6. "The Life Is the Red Wagon" – 4:12
7. "Half Angel Half Eagle" – 3:55
8. "La Jalouse" – 3:59
9. "Miss Punta Blanca" – 1:38
10. "Are We Dancing Now? (Map III)" – 6:11

== Personnel ==
- Jane Siberry – guitars, piano, vocals
- Teddy Borowiecki – piano, accordion
- Ken Myhr – guitars
- John Switzer – bass, vocals
- Stich Wynston – drums

=== Additional personnel ===
- Wendell Ferguson – pedal steel guitar on 5
- David Piltch – acoustic bass on 8
- David Ramsden – vocals on 6, 7
- Rebecca Jenkins – vocals on 6, 7
- Anne Bourne – vocals on 6
- Gina Stepaniuk – vocals on 6
- Cherie Camp – vocals on 6
- Don Freed – vocals on 4

== Charts ==
Album

Year	Chart	Peak position	Weeks on the chart
1987	RPM Top 100 Albums	80	6
