= The Walking =

Studio album by Jane Siberry
- Released: 1987
- Recorded: 1987
- Studio: Manta Sound, Toronto
- Genre: Art pop, progressive pop
- Length: 57:44
- Label: Duke Street, Reprise
- Producer: Jane Siberry, John Switzer

Jane Siberry chronology
The Speckless Sky (1985)	The Walking (1987)	Bound by the Beauty (1989)

The Walking is the fourth studio album by Jane Siberry. The album was released on Reprise Records internationally, but remained on the independent label Duke Street Records in Canada.

== Critical reception ==
Professional ratings
Review scores
Source	Rating
Allmusic	4/5 stars

The album was initially poorly received by Canadian critics. It largely turned its back on the quirky new wave pop that Siberry had been known for; in its place was a surreal amalgam of progressive rock and Laurie Anderson-style performance art narratives, only one of which was shorter than six minutes.

Toronto progressive radio station CFNY, an early champion of Siberry's music, announced that it did not view any track on The Walking as viable for airplay on their station. Sales of the album were slow at first, although they improved when Siberry provided radio stations with a shorter edit of "Ingrid and the Footman".

The album was better-received by critics in the United States, who were less familiar with Siberry's earlier pop-oriented material.

With the benefit of passing time, the Allmusic review by Sean Carruthers does a little bit of belated justice to the caliber of composition and performance of this recording: "It's her most accomplished work to date, but it's bound to lose the casual listener quickly."

The video for "Ingrid and the Footman" received a Juno Award nomination for Best Video at the Juno Awards of 1989.

== Track listing ==
All songs by Jane Siberry.

1. "The White Tent the Raft" – 9:12
2. "Red High Heels" – 7:19
3. "Goodbye" – 4:17
4. "Ingrid and the Footman" – 7:06
5. "Lena is a White Table" – 6:41
6. "The Walking (and Constantly)" – 6:16
7. "The Lobby" – 6:19
8. "The Bird in the Gravel" – 10:34

== Personnel ==
- Jane Siberry – vocals, guitars, piano, keyboards, backing vocals, bells
- Al Cross – drums, percussion, tambourine, backing vocals
- Anne Bourne – piano, organ, keyboards, backing vocals
- John Switzer – bass, tambourine, percussion, backing vocals
- Ken Myhr – acoustic guitar, electric guitar, backing vocals

=== Additional personnel ===
- Rob Yale – keyboards on 1
- Wendell Ferguson – electric guitar on 4
- David MacVittie – backing vocals on 4
- Bob Blumer – backing vocals on 4
- Rebecca Jenkins – backing vocals on 4, 7
- Gina Stepaniuk – backing vocals on 4
- Cherie Camp – backing vocals on 4, 7
- Sarah McElcheran – trumpet on 7
- Steven Donald – trombone on 7

== Charts ==
Album

Year	Chart	Peak position	Weeks on the chart
1987	RPM Top 100 Albums	76	13
