= Cock's Crow =

Studio album by Waltons
- Released: 1995
- Studios: Reaction Studios, Toronto, Ontario
- Genre: Folk-rock
- Length: 53:05
- Label: Warner Music Canada
- Producer: Michael Phillip Wojewoda

Waltons chronology
Simple Brain (1994)	Cock's Crow (1995)	Empire Hotel (1998)

Cock's Crow is the second full-length studio album by Waltons, released in 1995 on Warner Music Canada. Produced by Michael Phillip Wojewoda, the album features contributions from Geoffrey Kelly, John Mann and Linda McRae of Spirit of the West. It was also the band's first album to add the keyboards of Todd Lumley to the band's traditionally folk rock sound.

The album was supported by a national concert tour.

== Reaction ==
Nick Krewen of the Hamilton Spectator gave the album a mixed review, writing that "Singer Jason Plumb has invented stronger pop melodies and waxed eloquently on the ecologically-correct End of the World and the image-conscious Michelangelo's Tummy, but the harmonies and arrangements dredge up too many Crowded House comparisons for comfort. Keyboardist Todd Lumley, making his recording debut, adds welcome textures to The Waltons' previously stark sound, and the two Spirit of the West collaborations - Surprise and My Eye - are welcome breaks." David Howell of the Edmonton Journal gave a similar assessment, labelling "Surprise" as the album's best song and writing that "The Waltons will still take a few shots for sounding like Crowded House, but they seem to come by it honestly. Lots of nice clean acoustic pop here; catchy melodies, appealing harmonies. What's missing is a shot of adrenalin. We've heard them glad, we've heard them sad, now let's hope Plumb gets mad about something -- anything, really -- before he writes the next album."

For Allmusic, Roch Parisien rated the album four stars. He characterized Wojewoda's production as an "unfortunate misdirection" from the band's trademark sound, but concluded that the album "should satisfy most of those looking for their latest Eric Carmen/Tim Finn harmonic fix."

== Chart performance ==
The lead single "End of the World" was a Top 40 hit in Canada, peaking at #26 in the RPM100 the week of April 24, 1995. It was also modestly successful on the adult contemporary charts, peaking at #42 in the week of May 15. It was the only charting single from the album, which also sold more poorly than their 1992 album Lik My Trakter and did not place in the magazine's album charts.

== Awards ==
Wojewoda won the Juno Award for Producer of the Year at the Juno Awards of 1996, for his work on "End of the World" and Ashley MacIsaac's "Beaton's Delight".

== Track listing ==
All tracks are written by Jason Plumb, except where noted.

No.	Title	Writer(s)	Length
1.	"End of the World"		2:23
2.	"The Longest Line"		4:01
3.	"Wait Up for Me"	Jason Plumb, Keith Nakonechny	5:17
4.	"Surprise"	Jason Plumb, John Mann	3:38
5.	"Heartless"		3:11
6.	"Sky's Limit"		4:45
7.	"You Ewe U"		3:53
8.	"Heels Upon My Head"		4:47
9.	"Wascana"		3:05
10.	"Steel in Your Heart"		4:46
11.	"Something Wrong"		4:14
12.	"Michelangelo's Tummy"		4:49
13.	"My Eye"	Jason Plumb, John Mann	4:16
Total length:			53:05
