= Dragon Dreams =

Studio album by Jane Siberry as Issa
- Released: 2008
- Recorded: 2006–2008
- Length: 37:00
- Label: Sheeba Records
- Producer: Jane Siberry

Jane Siberry as Issa chronology
Shushan the Palace: Hymns of Earth (2003)	Dragon Dreams (2008)	With What Shall I Keep Warm? (2009)

Dragon Dreams is a studio album released in 2008 by Canadian singer-songwriter Jane Siberry under the name Issa. According to the album artwork, it is "the first of a story told in three parts." The music was written, produced, and arranged by Jane Siberry; all references to the artist in this recording are under the name Issa.

== Track listing ==
1. "A Train is Coming [excerpt]"
2. "Wilderness Wheel"
3. "Superhero Dream"
4. "Grace"
5. "Oui Allo?"
6. "I Pick Up the Phone"
7. "You Never Know"
8. "You Had a Good Thing"
9. "When We Are Queen"
10. "A Train is Coming"
11. "Send Me Someone to Love"

== Personnel ==
Singers: Catherine Russell, Marlon Saunders, Leslie Alexander, Gyan, Jacob Switzer, Paige Stewart-Escoffery, Ruby Salvatore Palmer, Gail Ann Dorsey, Maggie Moore, Rebecca Shoichet, Kerry Latimer, Rae Armour, John MacArthur Ellis

Instruments:

- John MacArthur Ellis - pedal steel, guitars
- Pauline Kim - violin, viola
- Christine Kim: cello
- James Roe - oboe
- Rich Brown - bass
- Niko Friesen - drums
- Carlos Beceiro - zanfona (hurdy-gurdy)
- Jamie Muñoz - bagpipes
