= Hush (Jane Siberry album) =

Studio album by Jane Siberry
- Released: 2000
- Recorded: 1999–2000
- Genre: Folk/Gospel
- Length: 47:59
- Label: Sheeba Records
- Producer: Jane Siberry

Jane Siberry chronology
| Tree: Music for Films and Forests (1999) | Hush (2000) | City (2001) |

Professional ratings
Review scores
| Source | Rating |
|---|---|
| AllMusic | 3/5 stars |

Hush is an album by Jane Siberry, released in 2000. The album is a collection of traditional folk and gospel songs.

The album was a nominee for Roots & Traditional Album of the Year – Solo at the 2001 Juno Awards.

== Track listing ==
1. "Jacob's Ladder" (4:08)
2. "All Through the Night" (4:33)
3. "Pontchartrain" (6:47)
4. "Streets of Laredo" (3:01)
5. "As I Roved Out" (4:38)
6. "False False Fly" (3:11)
7. "The Water is Wide" (6:28)
8. "Swing Low, Sweet Chariot" (4:46)
9. "Ol' Man River" (4:49) - (Oscar Hammerstein, Jerome Kern)
10. "O Shenandoah/Sail Away" (5:38)

== Personnel ==
- Jane Siberry - vocals, piano, accordion, harmonica, harp, keyboards
- Sandy Baron - violin
- Jennifer Weeks - oboe on "The Water is Wide"
