= Love Is Everything =

Love Is Everything may refer to:

== Albums ==
- Love Is Everything (Johnny Mathis album), 1965
- Love Is Everything: The Jane Siberry Anthology, 2002, or the title track by Jane Siberry
- Love Is Everything (George Strait album), 2013, or the title track

== Songs ==
- "Love Is Everything" (song), 2013, by Ariana Grande
- "Love Is Everything", a 1958 song by Carl Dobkins, Jr. With The Seniors
- "Love Is Everything", a 1978 single by Golden Harvest

== See also ==
- Everything is Love, a 2018 album by The Carters (Beyoncé and Jay-Z)
