= City (Jane Siberry album) =

Compilation album by Jane Siberry
- Released: 2001

Jane Siberry chronology
Hush (2000)	City (2001)	Love Is Everything: The Jane Siberry Anthology (2002)

Professional ratings
Review scores
Source	Rating
Allmusic	3/5 stars

City is a 2001 album by Jane Siberry. It is a collection of songs which mostly had not previously appeared on a regular Siberry album, comprising tracks that she recorded for movie soundtracks or in collaboration with other artists.

== Track listing ==
1. "My Mother Is Not the White Dove"
2. "Harmonix/I Went Down to the River"
3. "It Can't Rain All the Time" (from The Crow)
4. "Shir Amami" (with Frank London)
5. "The Bridge" (with Joe Jackson)
6. "She's Like a Swallow" (with Hector Zazou)
7. "When I Think of Laura Nyro" (from Time and Love: The Music of Laura Nyro)
8. "Calling All Angels" (with k.d. lang)
9. "Nut Brown Maid" (with Michael Grey)
10. "All the Pretty Ponies" (from Barney & Friends)
11. "Innig" (with Nigel Kennedy)
12. "Spade and Sparrow" (with Takafumi Sotoma)
13. "Narrow Bridge" (with Morgan Fisher)
14. "Slow Tango" (from Faraway, So Close!)
15. "The Kiss" (with Ghostland)
