= A Day in the Life (Jane Siberry album) =

Studio album by Jane Siberry
- Released: 1997
- Recorded: 1997
- Genres: Rock, sound collage
- Length: 28:20
- Label: Sheeba
- Producer: Jane Siberry

Jane Siberry chronology
Teenager (1996)	A Day in the Life (1997)	Child: Music for the Christmas Season (1997)

Professional ratings
Review scores
Source	Rating
Allmusic	3/5 stars

A Day in the Life is an album by Jane Siberry, released in 1997. It was the second release on her own Sheeba Records label after leaving Reprise.

It is not a conventional album of songs, but a sound collage of yoga classes, phone messages, conversations, street sounds, and includes a wide cast of characters including cab drivers, and artists like Patty Larkin, Joe Jackson, k.d. lang, and Darol Anger, as well as excerpts from several songs.

== Track listing ==
No.	Title	Writer(s)	Length
1.	"Yoga Class"		0:04
2.	"Jane's Message"		2:05
3.	"PATTY LARKIN"		4:42
4.	"Coming Up for Air"	Patty Larkin, Jane Siberry	2:08
5.	"LAURA NYRO"		1:00
6.	"When I Think of Laura Nyro"	Jane Siberry, Laura Nyro	1:00
7.	"Microsoft/Rifff 'Peony'"		3:19
8.	"JOE JACKSON"		0:34
9.	"The Bridge"	Joe Jackson, Jane Siberry	1:29
10.	"Bottom Line"		0:36
11.	"DAROL ANGER"		1:34
12.	"Oh Shenandoah"	Jane Siberry, Darol Anger	1:04
13.	"Solar Blast"		1:04
14.	"k.d. lang"		0:37
15.	"Haint it Funny"	Jane Siberry	5:30
16.	"The End of the Day"		0:36
17.	"In My Dream"	Jane Siberry	1:48
18.	"Moon"		0:10
