= I've Heard the Mermaids Singing =

1987 Canadian film by Patricia Rozema

- Theatrical release poster
- Directed by: Patricia Rozema
- Written by: Patricia Rozema
- Produced by: Patricia Rozema; Alexandra Raffé
- Starring: Sheila McCarthy; Paule Baillargeon; Ann-Marie MacDonald
- Cinematography: Douglas Koch
- Edited by: Patricia Rozema
- Music by: Mark Korven
- Production company: Vos Productions
- Distributed by: Cinephile
- Release dates: May 10, 1987 (Cannes); September 11, 1987 (United States)
- Running time: 81 minutes
- Country: Canada
- Language: English
- Budget: CAD$362,000
- Box office: CAD$10 million

I've Heard the Mermaids Singing is a 1987 Canadian comedy-drama film written and directed by Patricia Rozema and starring Sheila McCarthy, Paule Baillargeon, and Ann-Marie MacDonald. It was the first English-language Canadian feature film to win an award at the Cannes Film Festival.

== Plot ==
Polly is a worker for a temporary secretarial agency. Polly serves as the narrator for the film, and there are frequent sequences portraying her whimsical fantasies. Polly lives alone, seems to have no friends and enjoys solitary bicycle rides to undertake her hobby of photography. Despite her clumsiness, lack of education, social awkwardness and inclination to take others' statements literally, all of which have resulted in scarce employment opportunities, Polly is placed as a secretary in a private art gallery owned by Gabrielle.

Ann-Marie MacDonald plays Mary, who is Gabrielle's former young lover, and also a painter. Mary returns after an absence, and she and Gabrielle rekindle their former relationship despite Gabrielle's misgivings that she is too old and Mary too young.

Polly, who's fallen a little bit in love with Gabrielle, is inspired to submit some of her own photographs anonymously to the gallery. She is crushed when Gabrielle dismisses her photos out of hand and calls them "simpleminded". Polly temporarily quits the gallery, and goes into a depression. She returns to the gallery, and revives a little when Mary notices one of her photos.

All the while, Mary and Gabrielle have been perpetrating a fraud. Gabrielle has been passing off Mary's work as her own. When Polly finds out, she becomes livid and tosses a cup of tea at Gabrielle. Believing she has done something unforgivable, Polly retreats to her flat in anguish.

Mary and Gabrielle later visit Polly at her flat, and realize that the discarded photographs were by Polly.

As the film ends, Gabrielle and Mary look at more of Polly's photographs and in a short fantasy sequence the three are transported together to an idyllic wooded glen, a metaphor for the beautiful world that supposedly plain and unnoticed people like Polly inhabit.

== Cast ==
- Sheila McCarthy as Polly Vandersma
- Paule Baillargeon as Gabrielle St. Peres
- Ann-Marie MacDonald as Mary Joseph
- Richard Monette as Clive
- John Evans as Warren
- Brenda Kamino as waitress

== Production ==
Producers Rozema and Alexandra Raffé had never directed or produced a feature film prior to their work on Mermaids, although they worked together on a previous short film.

=== Development ===
Patricia Rozema started writing film scripts in 1983 while working as an assistant producer on The Journal, but all of them were rejected until her short film Passion: A Letter in 16 mm received funding in 1985. During this time period, she also took a five-week class on 16 mm film production at Ryerson Polytechnical Institute in Toronto.

Although Passion won a Silver Plaque at the 1985 Chicago International Film Festival, it also received a very harsh review in The Globe and Mail. The negative criticism of Passion and the personal rejection felt by Rozema compelled her to make Mermaids with its strong anti-authority motif "which examines the merciless negative judgments of the Toronto elitist high art milieu".

Rozema started writing I've Heard the Mermaids Singing while working as third assistant director for The Fly. She showed the first draft to her friends, including Ann-Marie MacDonald. While writing the screenplay she received two grants from the Canada Council and Ontario Arts Council worth $48,000. Through the writing process, the film's working title changed from Polly to Polly's Progress to Polly's Interior Mind. When the script was submitted for grant funding in June 1986, the title was Oh, the Things I've Seen.

The film's title is taken from the poem The Love Song of J. Alfred Prufrock, Rozema's favorite poem by T. S. Eliot. It was the second film playing on the film festival circuit in 1987 that had a title taken from the same Eliot poem, following Eat the Peach (1986).

Rozema initially planned on making the film for television, but the script was 65 minutes long. Rather than cut the script, Rozema was advised by Debbie Nightingale from the then-new Ontario Film Development Corporation to expand the script by at least 15 minutes so it could be eligible for OFDC feature film funds.

=== Funding and budget ===
Rozema presented the script to the Ontario Film Development Corporation in June 1986. Her funding application received a letter of recommendations from David Cronenberg, Stuart Cornfeld, and "anyone I could think of who had any credibility in the industry" according to Rozema. Raffé requested $85,000 in funding. The OFDC's report stated that the organization should not fund the film. Jonathon Barker, the OFDC's legal affairs officer, opposed funding the film as it was "a piece of shit that would never do anything". However, Nightingale chose to fund the film and later increased the investment to $100,000.

Rozema and Raffé were hesitant to seek funding from Telefilm Canada as Peter Pearson was known for being "philosophically averse to low-budget, auteur-driven films", but decided that funding from Telefilm was essential for the film. Pearson reportedly stomped out of a meeting declaring that Telefilm "should not be financing these kind of minimalist, student films".

After many weeks of discussions, the agency finally agreed to fund the film after Rozema and Raffé brought on experienced film producer Don Haig in the role of executive producer who worked on the film for $7,000, as the other options were too expensive and Haig would not impede on their creative control. Also important to Telefilm's eventual funding was a contract with film distribution company Cinephile, which agreed to a $5,000 guarantee, representing the absolute minimum required by the funding agency.} Telefilm agreed to give them $163,000, but the final agreements with Telefilm were not completed until fall 1986, by which time the filming was already completed. In the interim, producer Raffé had taken a bank overdraft of $25,000.

The film's budget details vary by source. In her book about the film, scholar Julia Mendenhall wrote that the film had a budget of $362,000; one article in the Toronto Star said the budget was $350,000 plus another $40K to blow up the negative from 16 mm to 35 mm; a different Star article stated the budget was $325,000. American newspapers also reported different budgets for the film. A San Francisco Chronicle article says the budget was US$273,000 which translated into $350,000; an article in a Fort Lauderdale, Florida newspaper says the budget was US$262,000, which was the same amount cited in a New York Times film review. The newspaper USA Today reported the budget as less than US$300,000. Michael Posner stated that the film was made on a budget of $362,109.

=== Pre-production ===
Rozema says she and Raffé worked in pre-production full-time between February 1986 and September 23, 1986. For their financing applications, the producers named their company Vos Productions. Vos means "fox" in Dutch and was Rozema's mother's maiden name.

==== Casting ====
Casting director Maria Armstrong, who worked on Passion for free, was hired by Rozema and given a casting budget of $500 to help identify the actors for Mermaids. Armstrong submitted a list of six or seven names for the role of Polly, including Sheila McCarthy. It took several readings before Rozema decided to hire McCarthy. In the director's commentary on the DVD, Rozema said about the casting of McCarthy: "When she came into the audition, I thought 'oh, pleeease be able to act.' She looked so unbelievably perfect, like a little bird just hatched. Almost asexual with these gigantic, sympathetic eyes. And ... a kind of sweetness of manner that seemed just so right."

Unlike McCarthy, who was unknown to Rozema prior to the making of the film, the director was already a friend of actress Ann-Marie MacDonald but Rozema still required her to audition for the role of Mary Joseph.

=== Filming ===
Mermaids was shot in Toronto between September 24 and October 24, 1986, using a 16 mm camera, later enlarged to 35 mm, as 35 mm and Super 16 mm were too expensive to film in. After principal filming was completed, Rozema, McCarthy and the first assistant director filmed additional location shots around Toronto for four or five days.

The filming of Polly's fantasy flying scene was accomplished with a $60 special effect.

=== Post-production ===
Rozema edited the film between the end of 1986 through January 1987. The National Film Board of Canada allowed her to use their editing studios free of charge. Later, the NFB offered to pay for the consulting services of professional editor Ron Sanders, which Rozema accepted. In the director's commentary, Rozema said that because the film had such a small budget, she didn't have the luxury of multiple takes of many scenes. Most of the filmed footage was included in the final version of the film.

Following a rough cut screening of the film in February 1987, Cinephile president Andre Bennett suggested that the film be entered in the Directors' Fortnight program at the Cannes Film Festival. Rozema initially rejected that idea because she didn't think the film was ready, as it was in the final stages of sound editing and still had to be mixed. However, after some positive reviews of these screenings, Rozema decided to submit the film to a selection committee that met in March. By the time Mermaids was selected for screening at Cannes, Rozema and her crew had less than six weeks to complete the film. They requested that Telefilm cover the $40,000 cost of blowing the film up to 35 mm for its showing at Cannes, but the organization refused and it was instead funded by deducting it from the foreign sales revenue of Films Transit.

Rofekamp also generated the marketing plan for the film's premiere at Cannes. Tasks included compiling a press kit, creating promotional posters and other materials, translating the script into French, creating a print with French subtitles, and placing advertisements in trade publications.

Rozema originated the concept for the film's poster, envisioning a René Magritte-like photograph of McCarthy's head floating over a body of water. She hired Toronto graphic artist Robbie Goulden to create the final product, with promises of payment if the film made a profit. The photograph of McCarthy used in the poster was a family picture taken by McCarthy's father. Eighty percent of all buyers of the film used the same image in their advertising, and it was used on the cover of both the American and Canadian DVD releases.

==== Music ====
The original plan was for singer-songwriter Jane Siberry to provide the voicings of the mermaids. But Siberry had a cold on the day those recordings were scheduled to take place, so her backing vocalist Rebecca Jenkins substituted instead.

The musical score was composed by Mark Korven, who had only two weeks to complete the work. The film's musical arranger was John Switzer, who was also Jane Siberry's bassist.

During the initial depiction of one of Polly's visions, the "Flower Duet" aria from Léo Delibes' opera Lakmé is heard as background music; portions of this aria are heard multiple times throughout the film. Near the end of the film, Polly has a vision of conducting a small orchestra, performing selections from Ludwig van Beethoven's Fifth Symphony.

== Release ==
The film was distributed by Cinephile in Canada, Miramax in the United States, and Films Transit elsewhere. Bennett sold the film to First Choice for $150,000 and the CBC for $120,000.

=== Cannes premiere ===
I've Heard the Mermaids Singing made its world premiere on May 10, 1987, at the Cannes Film Festival, as part of the Directors' Fortnight program. At the conclusion of the screening, two thousand audience members gave the film a six-minute standing ovation. Four additional screenings of the film were added to the Cannes schedule, and all sold out.

The film almost wasn't screened at Cannes. When Pierre-Henri Deleau, the programmer for the Directors' Fortnight, received the film he mistakenly thought it was three hours long and would not preview it. A technician later discovered the film was less than 90 minutes, so Deleau watched it, liked what he saw, and invited Rozema to the festival.

Some distribution deals had been made prior to Cannes, but Rozema and Raffé had intentionally not sold the U.S. rights before the world premiere. After the film's selection for Cannes was announced in Variety, the producers received numerous calls from American distributors who wanted private previews, but those requests were turned down. Raffé said of that decision "We decided we wouldn't screen it for anybody. You would see it in the theatre with a big audience, and we would either win big or lose big."

Following the successful Cannes premiere, the producers negotiated the sale of American distribution rights. At least seven American companies vied for the rights, including Orion Classics, Spectrafilm, and the eventual winner of the bidding war Miramax, represented at Cannes by Harvey Weinstein and Mark Silverman. Weinstein initially offered US$100,000 for the U.S. rights, but Raffé and Rozema rejected that offer and several subsequent ones from Miramax until they finally settled on US$350,000, which was the biggest number the producers could think of, as it represented the film's production budget.

By the end of the Cannes Film Festival, Rofekamp, Rozema and Raffé had negotiated sales to 32 countries including France, Germany, and the U.K. as well smaller countries such as Norway, Greece, Singapore, and South Africa. Rofekamp and the producers had earned advances on royalties worth $1.1 million, which made the film commercially successful before it was released.

=== Other premieres ===
The first post-Cannes film festival showing was in Portugal at the Figueira da Foz Film Festival on September 7, 1987.

The film made its Canadian premiere at the Festival of Festivals (now the Toronto International Film Festival) on September 10, 1987, and was honored by being screened at the festival's opening night gala, following upon the successful Cannes premiere.

The United States premiere and first theatrical screening took place on September 11, 1987, at the 68th Street Playhouse in New York City.

=== Film festival screenings ===
Mermaids was invited to 32 film festivals, including festivals in Moscow, Munich, Hong Kong, Jerusalem and Mexico.

Specific film festival screenings included:

- Cannes Film Festival (10 May 1987)
- Locarno Film Festival (August 1987)
- Figueira da Foz Film Festival (7 September 1987)
- Festival of Festivals (10 September 1987)
- Boston Film Festival (17 and 20 September 1987)
- Telluride Film Festival (September 1987)
- Vancouver International Film Festival (16 October 1987)
- London Film Festival (19 November 1987)
- Istanbul Film Festival (April 1988)
- Adelaide Film Event (July 1988)
- Brno Gay and Lesbian Film Festival (16 November 2002)

== Critical response ==
=== Mainstream media reception ===
Reviews of the film in mainstream media following the Cannes premiere through its run in theaters were mixed, with some male reviewers initially less enthusiastic about the film than female reviewers. As time passed, the reviews became more positive.

The entertainment trade magazine Variety was given a private screening of the film in Toronto on 30 April 1987. Their official review, published on 20 May 1987 was very positive, stating that Mermaids is "an off-beat, power-packed first feature ... bursting with confidence, with Rozema in full control in all capacities nearly every step of the way.... It has an obvious active life in the art market, on the fest circuit, and in subsequent tv and video playoff."

However, in Vincent Canby's review in The New York Times, the critic wrote that watching the film "is like being cornered by a whimsical, 500-pound elf" and that it "takes itself more seriously than the screenplay warrants".

Richard Corliss wrote in Time magazine that the film is "a fairy tale for feminist pre-teens" and said Rozema was working "entirely too hard to be ingratiating; her picture is a desperate audition for endearment".

John Richardson from the Daily News of Los Angeles gave the film a grade of C, stating that the film is "basically a student work, and not a particularly good student work at that. It's not film making, it's film musing." The reviewer went on to say the film represents "feminism with a smile face".

A San Francisco Chronicle article about the film described it as "a Cinderella story of major proportions".

A review by Rita Kempley in The Washington Post said the film is "rough around the edges, brimming with uncontrolled talent and confiding as a close friend. And like its protagonist Polly Vandersma, it is not as simple-minded as it first seems, for under all the whimsy, an allegory hides."

Film critic Molly Haskell wrote in Vogue magazine that the film was a "smashing commercial directorial debut" and described it as "a feminist fairy tale masquerading as a satire".

An article by Graham Fuller in The Guardian stated that the film "is one of the outstanding directorial debuts of the year".

In a December 1987 review, Bob Thomas from the Associated Press wrote that Rozema's "vivid and surprising imagination, coupled with a startingly original performance by Sheila McCarthy, help make the film a rare and unexpected delight".

In his March 1988 review of the film, critic Roger Ebert gave the film 3.5 out of 4 stars, and wrote that director Rozema "uses a seemingly simple style to make some quiet and deep observations". Ebert also described Sheila McCarthy's performance as "extraordinary" and said "she has one of those faces that speaks volumes, and she is able to be sad without being depressing, funny without being a clown".

As of September 2022, 94% of the 16 critical reviews compiled by Rotten Tomatoes are positive, with an average score of 7.2 out of 10. The film has no scores collected by Metacritic as of 2020.

=== Feminist analysis and criticism ===
Canadian film scholar Thomas Waugh described Rozema as "the most prominent of English Canadian lesbian filmmakers". In identifying a feminist approach to this film and understanding Rozema's artistic intentions, Rozema says in an interview from 1991 that she refuses to define her work as "distinctly feminist" and emphasizes that "gender is a category that does not interest her". However, in 1993, Rozema claimed that her films assume feminism, concluding that "it's in their foundation".

In Rozema's cinematic work, the main characters are predominantly women, in heterosexual or lesbian relationships, or single. Several of her film features portray or touch upon lesbian love, a theme quite apparently shown in Mermaids.

The critic Camille Paglia praised the film's "wonderful comedy and realism", commenting on the character Polly, "This girl's kind of aimless, yet plucky. It's the twentysomething problem with self-definition."

A November 1987 review of the film in the feminist newspaper Sojourner said that Mermaids "is a film that could only be made by a woman. It strikes deeply at the heart of women's experiences in a way that even serious and compassionate male directors never do." The review continues with "this film focuses on different kinds of love between women".

Yet within some gay and alternative media coverage, there was criticism that the film glossed over the lesbian relationship between two of the characters, as well as complaints that Rozema had made a "decision not to make a public declaration of her sexuality in interviews with the world press after Cannes".

In a September 1987 article about the film in the American newspaper Gay Community News, contributor Loie Hayes wrote "Why, when I love Patricia Rozema's film just as it is, why do I cringe when she says it's not 'about lesbianism'?" Hayes went on to describe the film as "an ambitious and thoroughly entertaining treatise on creativity and commercial success; it's an 'anti-authority' film with the nerd winning over the admiration of the elegant, rich, power-turkey".

In October 1987, Canadian journalist and lesbian activist Chris Bearchell wrote in a review of Mermaids that "Even if fairy tales sometimes come true, it seems that a truly dyke tale, fanciful or otherwise, will have to wait for an out-of-the-closet dyke to write it".

The first essay on Mermaids in a prominent academic journal by a highly credentialed feminist film scholar was written by Teresa de Lauretis in 1990. In her Screen article, de Lauretis "applied a political rubric that she called 'alternative women's cinema', and Mermaids failed her test". De Lauretis wrote that the recognition of Mermaids as "an exemplary film of women's cinema is ground for serious self-questioning by those of us who still want to claim the term for a feminist political project".

In her book about the film, scholar Julia Mendenhall claims that the de Lauretis article in Screen was the start of "the great divide in scholarly criticism" on Mermaids, although Mendenhall sided with the more positive reception of the film, writing:

In the late 1980s, before the formation of highly visible and vocal queer activist groups and the academic institutionalization of queer theory, Mermaids' stealth activism was effective at getting its queer message across via its quiet, Canadian, indirect queer didacticism, with its shy "Everywoman" Polly and her stolen camera and low-tech mic. This method got Rozema and her film into Cannes for a May '87, not a May '68, style of activism, where her quiet revolution of a film was embraced as the voice for its times.

== Box office ==
According to Box Office Mojo, the film earned US$25,998 in its first weekend, playing in only one theater. Its widest release in the United States during its theatrical run was in 27 theaters, and this source said the film earned a total of $1,408,491 in the US.

For the beginning of its theatrical run in New York City, the distributor took out a full page advertisement in The New York Times, at a cost of US$25,000. After its first two weeks playing in New York, the film had earned more than $70,000.

The New York theatrical release led to a successful national roll-out, with the film eventually screening in approximately 50 American cities. It performed best in locations with dedicated art film audiences. Co-producer Raffé claimed that the film grossed about $2.5 million in the United States, despite Miramax's "inscrutable bookkeeping methods".

The film earned over $70,000 in the first ten days of its theatrical release in Ottawa and was played there for over three months. It was one of the top ten highest grossing films in Quebec in 1987. By May 1992, the film earned $644,000 in Canada with $264,965 coming from its theatrical release, $177,000 from pay television, $150,200 from free television, $41,000 from its video release, and $11,223 from non-theatrical. The film earned a net profit of $437,000 in Canada. According to Raffé, the film grossed over $10 million in worldwide receipts, earning more than twenty-five times its production costs.

== Awards and honors ==
I've Heard the Mermaids Singing won seventeen awards worldwide by the end of its run at film festivals and theatrical release, including:

- Cannes Film Festival, 1987: Prix de la Jeunesse [youth prize] (Directors' Fortnight), awarded to Patricia Rozema
- Genie Award, 1988: Best Performance by an Actress in a Leading Role, awarded to Sheila McCarthy
- Genie Award, 1988: Best Performance by an Actress in a Supporting Role, awarded to Paule Baillargeon

In addition to its Genie Award victories, it was also nominated for Best Picture, Best Director (Rozema), Best Supporting Actress (MacDonald), Best Screenplay (Rozema), Best Cinematography (Douglas Koch), Best Costume Design (Alexandra Z, Martine Matthews), and Best Overall Sound (Michelle Moses, Egidio Coccimiglio and Gordon Thompson).

In addition, the film garnered the following honors:

- In 1993, the Toronto International Film Festival ranked the film ninth in its list of the Top 10 Canadian Films of All Time, with Rozema becoming the first female director to have a film on the list. The film did not appear on the updated 2004 or 2015 versions of the list.
- Named a Top Ten Canadian Film of the 20th Century
- Named as one of the Top 25 Films That Changed Our Lives by the Outfest Film Festival
- Named as one of the Top Ten Canadian Feature Film Debuts Since 1968, in a poll conducted by the Canadian Film Centre
- Included in a 10-week festival of New Canadian Cinema, aired in late 1989 on the United Kingdom's Channel 4 television network

== Home media ==
Mermaids was first released on VHS tape in Canada by Norstar Home Video. It was released on VHS tape in the United States during the last week of March, 1988 by Charter Entertainment.

It was first released on DVD in the United States by Miramax Home Entertainment in 2000 and in Canada by Alliance Atlantis in 2002. Both DVD releases include a director's commentary by Patricia Rozema. The US DVD also contains other special features including a theatrical trailer, biographies, and a photo gallery. The film has also been released on VHS tape and DVD in other countries and in other years.

== See also ==
- List of LGBT films directed by women
