= Lips: Music for Saying It =

Live album by Jane Siberry
- Released: 1999
- Label: Sheeba Records

Jane Siberry chronology
Child: Music for the Christmas Season (1997)	Lips: Music for Saying It (1999)	Tree: Music for Films and Forests (1999)

Professional ratings
Review scores
Source	Rating
Allmusic	4/5 stars

Lips: Music for Saying It is a 1999 live album by Jane Siberry.

It presents material she recorded at a 1996 concert at the famed New York City jazz club The Bottom Line. The material includes both original songs by Siberry and covers of other songwriters, all organized around the theme of self-expression.

The album also includes the song "Mimi Speaks", a sequel to her first hit "Mimi on the Beach" (from 1984's No Borders Here). In the original song, Mimi was merely observed by the narrator; in "Mimi Speaks", Siberry presents Mimi's perspective.

It was one of four concerts she performed at The Bottom Line. Two of the others appear on the double album Child: Music for the Christmas Season, and the last appears on Tree: Music for Films and Forests. All three albums have also been released as the New York City Trilogy box set.

== Track listing ==
All songs written by Siberry, except where noted.

1. "First Word"
2. "Valley of the Dolls" - (André Previn, Dory Previn)
3. "Freedom is Gold"
4. "Hotel Room 417"
5. "Foecke"
6. "I Will Survive" - (Dino Fekaris, Freddie Perren)
7. "Flirtin' is a Flo-Thing"
8. "Say It (Excerpt)"
9. "Grace Hospital"
10. "You Say I Say"
11. "Mimi Speaks"
12. "Last Word"
13. "Say It"
14. "Barkis Is Willin'"

== Personnel ==
- Jane Siberry - vocals, piano
- Debbie Knapper, Larry Baeder - guitar
- Gail Ann Dorsey - bass guitar, vocals
- Tim Ray - piano, organ
- Dean Sharp - drums
- Catherine Russell, Lisa Lindo, Rebecca Campbell - vocals
