= Neo A4 =

Canadian rock band

- Origin: Edmonton, Alberta, Canada
- Genres: Alternative rock; new wave; progressive pop
- Years active: 1981–1990
- Label: Duke Street Records
- Past members: Ric Johnston; Joel Anderson; John Tidswell; Doug Radford

Neo A4 (stylized as NEO a4) was a Canadian rock band that formed in Edmonton, Alberta that was active from 1981 to 1990.

The band consisted of Ric Johnston (lead vocals, guitar), Joel Anderson (percussion, vocals) and John Tidswell (bass, keyboards), with bassist and keyboardist Doug Radford joining the band after their relocation to Toronto in 1987.

== History ==
Neo A4 was established in 1981 in Edmonton as a trio, featuring Ric Johnston as the band's lead vocalist and guitarist, Joel Anderson on drums and backing vocals, and John Tidswell on bass and keyboards. The band took its name from philosopher P. D. Ouspensky's theories on the fourth dimension.

The band independently released the EP What's Up in 1983, and their first full-length album, The Warmer Side Of You in 1985. The band won an Alberta Recording Industry Association award for best group of the year in 1986 and were nominated as Best Independent Artist at the CASBY Awards that same year.

In 1987 Neo A4 relocated to Toronto, signed with the Duke Street Records, and released the album Desire that same year. Bassist and keyboardist Doug Radford, formerly of Edmonton group Darkroom, joined the band in 1988 for their follow-up, self-titled album, NEO a4, allowing Tidswell to move from playing bass to guitar. The album was produced by English recording engineer and record producer Colin Thurston, known for his work on David Bowie's "Heroes", Iggy Pop's Lust for Life and Duran Duran's debut album. The album marked the band's transition to a less-experimental and more pop-oriented sound. The tracks "One's Enough", "Say This to Me" and "Only A fool", all charted in Canada.

In 1989 they released The Hard Way, whose singles "That's the Way" and "Calling You" made the top 100 Canadian singles and top CanCon singles charts respectively, but the band did not find the level of success that they had hoped for, and found the cost of living in Toronto to be too expensive. The band dissolved in 1990, with Tidswell and Radford returning to Alberta, Johnston relocating to Penticton, British Columbia and Anderson remaining in Toronto and joining the Leslie Spit Treeo.

== Discography ==
- What's Up EP (1983)
- The Warmer Side Of You (1985)
- Desire (1987)
- NEO a4 (1988)
- The Hard Way (1989)

=== Singles ===
Year	Title	Peak chart positions		Album
Year	Title	CAN	CAN Content (CanCon)	Album
1987	"Desire"	88	—	Desire
1988	"If It Was You"	—	—	NEO a4
1988	"One's Enough"	—	23	NEO a4
1988	"Say This to Me"	54	8	NEO a4
1988	"Only A Fool"	86	21	NEO a4
1989	"Calling You"	—	2	The Hard Way
1989	"That's The Way"	51	—	The Hard Way
"—" denotes a recording that did not chart.
