= Tree: Music for Films and Forests =

Live album by Jane Siberry
- Released: 1999
- Recorded: Bottom Line Club, New York City, 1996
- Label: Sheeba Records

Jane Siberry chronology
Lips: Music for Saying It (1999)	Tree: Music for Films and Forests (1999)	Hush (2000)

Professional ratings
Review scores
Source	Rating
Allmusic	4/5 stars

Tree: Music for Films and Forests is a 1999 live album by Jane Siberry.

It presents a concert she recorded at New York City's famed Bottom Line jazz club in 1996. The concert predominantly presents songs that Siberry wrote which were in some way about trees and forests; however, she also includes two songs that she wrote and recorded for movie soundtracks. "Slow Tango" originally appeared in the Wim Wenders film Faraway, So Close!, and "It Can't Rain All the Time" appeared in the film The Crow.

It was one of four concerts she performed at The Bottom Line. Two of the others appear on the double album Child: Music for the Christmas Season, and the last appears on Lips: Music for Saying It. All three albums have also been released as the New York City Trilogy box set.

== Track listing ==
All songs written by Siberry.

1. "Slow Tango"
2. "Burning Ship"
3. "When Last I Was a Fisherman"
4. "It Can't Rain All the Time"
5. "I Paddle My Canoe"
6. "Adam and Eve"
7. "Up the Loggin' Road"
8. "Goin' Down the River"
9. "At the Beginning of Time"
