= No Borders Here =

Studio album by Jane Siberry
- Released: 1984
- Recorded: 1983–1984
- Studio: Inception Sound Studios, Toronto; Manta Sound, Toronto
- Genre: Progressive pop, ambient pop, new wave
- Length: 42:32
- Label: Duke Street Records, Open Air Records, Windham Hill Records
- Producer: Jon Goldsmith, Kerry Crawford, Jane Siberry, John Switzer

Jane Siberry chronology
Jane Siberry (1981)	No Borders Here (1984)	The Speckless Sky (1985)

Canadian LP cover

Professional ratings
Review scores
Source	Rating
AllMusic	4/5 stars
Robert Christgau	B−

No Borders Here is the second album (and first to be available outside Canada) by Jane Siberry.

The album's single "Mimi on the Beach" was Siberry's breakthrough hit in her native Canada, and remains one of her most famous songs. Toronto's CFNY was the first radio station in Canada to recognize the song's hit potential. The song's video was also one of the first influential clips on MuchMusic.

== Track listing ==
All songs by Jane Siberry, except "Extra Executives" (music co-written by John Switzer).

Side one

1. "The Waitress" – 2:25
2. "I Muse Aloud" – 4:11
3. "Dancing Class" – 6:41
4. "Extra Executives" – 4:26
5. "You Don't Need" – 4:25

Side two

1. "Symmetry (The Way Things Have to Be)" – 4:57
2. "Follow Me" – 4:19
3. "Mimi on the Beach" – 7:35
4. "Map of the World, Pt. 1" – 3:33

== Personnel ==
- Jane Siberry – guitar, keyboards, vocals
- Al Cross – drums, percussion, LinnDrum
- Ken Myhr – guitar
- John Switzer – bass, percussion

Additional personnel

- Jon Goldsmith – keyboards
- Doug Wilde – keyboards
- Rob Yale – Fairlight CMI programming

== Chart positions ==
- RPM - 68
