= The Speckless Sky =

Studio album by Jane Siberry
- Released: September 24, 1985
- Recorded: 1985
- Studio: Manta Sound, Toronto
- Genre: Progressive pop, ambient pop, new wave
- Length: 42:32
- Label: Duke Street Records, Open Air Records, Windham Hill Records
- Producer: Jane Siberry, John Switzer

Jane Siberry chronology
No Borders Here (1984)	The Speckless Sky (1985)	The Walking (1988)

Professional ratings
Review scores
Source	Rating
Allmusic	link
PopMatters	not rated link
Rolling Stone	not rated link

The Speckless Sky is an album by Jane Siberry. It was Siberry's highest-charting album on the Canadian charts and contains her biggest Top 40 hit, "One More Colour". The album's second single, "Map of the World (Part II)", was also a hit on Canada's adult contemporary charts.

Rheostatics recorded a cover of "One More Colour", with additional lyrics by Martin Tielli, on their 1995 album Introducing Happiness; Siberry and Tielli recorded a duet, "A Long Time Love Song", on the 1991 Bruce Cockburn tribute album Kick at the Darkness. Sarah Polley also performed a cover of "One More Colour" in the film The Sweet Hereafter.

After this album, Siberry's work was distributed outside of Canada by Reprise Records.

Shawn Colvin based lyrics for her song "Kill The Messenger" on the cover art for this album after seeing Siberry perform live.

The Speckless Sky is no longer available on CD, but can be obtained via her store site on Bandcamp.

== Reception ==
Keyboard compared Jane Siberry's sound to "Petula Clark trying to sound like Kate Bush", but praised the album for the "startling electronic orchestrations" featured in several tracks in the album.

The album won the jury vote for the Polaris Heritage Prize at the 2025 Polaris Music Prize.

== Track listing ==
All songs by Jane Siberry.

1. "One More Colour" – 4:38
2. "Seven Steps to the Wall" – 5:11
3. "The Very Large Hat" – 5:35
4. "Vladimir • Vladimir" – 7:08
5. "Mein Bitte" – 4:20
6. "The Empty City" – 6:40
7. "Map of the World (Part II)" – 5:07
8. "The Taxi Ride" – 5:39

== Personnel ==
- Jane Siberry – vocals, keyboards, guitar
- Al Cross – drums
- Anne Bourne – keyboards
- John Switzer – bass
- Ken Myhr – guitar, guitar synth
- Rob Yale – Fairlight CMI programming, keyboards

Additional personnel

- Teddy Borowiecki – accordion on 4 7
- Sarah McElcheran – trumpet on 7

== Charts ==
Album

Year	Chart	Peak position	Weeks on the chart
1986	Billboard 200	149	
1985	RPM Top 100 Albums	17	32

Singles

Song	Year	Chart	Position
"One More Colour"	1985	RPM Top 100 Singles	27
"Map of the World (Part II)"	1986	RPM Adult Contemporary	17

== Certifications ==
Organization	Level	Date
CRIA – Canada	Gold	March 21, 1986

== Cover Versions ==
The Art of Time Ensemble featuring (former Barenaked Ladies singer) Steven Page recorded The Taxi Ride for their 2010 album A Singer Must Die.
