= Lik My Trakter =

Studio album by the Waltons
- Released: 1992
- Genres: Folk pop, alternative rock
- Producer: John Switzer

The Waltons chronology
| Lik My Trakter (1992) | Simple Brain (1994) |

Singles from Lik My Trakter
- 1. "Colder Than You"; 2. "In the Meantime"; 3. "The Naked Rain"

Lik My Trakter (pronounced "like my tractor") is the first album by the Canadian band the Waltons, released in 1992. Initially released independently, it received a national release on Warner Music Canada; it was released by Sire Records in the U.S. The band supported the album with a Canadian tour, often playing with Barenaked Ladies. The album was certified gold in Canada.

== Production ==
Recorded in Toronto, the album was produced by John Switzer. Many songs reference the band's Regina, Saskatchewan, upbringing. The band was influenced by the songwriting of Andy Partridge. Kim Deschamps played mandolin and guitar on the album. The album title was based on a child's misspelling.

== Critical reception ==
Professional ratings
Review scores
| Source | Rating |
|---|---|
| AllMusic | 3/5 stars |
| The Buffalo News | 4/5 stars |
| Calgary Herald | B |
| Chicago Tribune | 2/4 stars |
| Fort Worth Star-Telegram | 2/4 stars |
| The Republican | 2.5/5 stars |
| The Tampa Tribune | 1/4 stars |
| Toronto Sun | 4/5 stars |

The Kitchener-Waterloo Record stated that "the Waltons are best compared to the early '70s country-folk-rockers, with the major updates coming in the form of '90s-style highly ironic lyrics." The Chicago Tribune opined that "the acoustic riffs and relationship lyrics make the record, on the whole, about as exciting as oatmeal." The Fort Worth Star-Telegram concluded that Lik My Trakter is "marred by rhyming-dictionary lyrics and clunky song structures." The Tampa Tribune contended that "Lik My Trakter most closely resembles Christian rock without the religious conviction."

The Toronto Sun deemed the album "one of the finest sets of acoustic pop we've heard since the first Crowded House album." The Buffalo News considered it "filled with the folky, alternative rocking sounds that make the Waltons so refreshing." The Palm Beach Post called it "intelligent, snappy acoustic pop." The Virginian-Pilot determined that the "tight, acoustic, melodic pop seems simple on first listen but more complex with each spin."

AllMusic wrote: " Singer/songwriter Jason Plumb has a fine line in minor-key ballads, but a dozen politely acoustic songs in a row with subtle shadings of lap steel and organ leave the listener itching for something with a little more sonic variety."

== Track listing ==
| No. | Title | Length |
|---|---|---|
| 1. | "Colder Than You" |
| 2. | "Sunshine" |
| 3. | "The Water Well and the Farmer's Hand" |
| 4. | "In the Meantime" |
| 5. | "I Could Care Less" |
| 6. | "Truth and Beauty" |
| 7. | "The Living Room" |
| 8. | "Look at Me" |
| 9. | "The Naked Rain" |
| 10. | "(Don't Let It) Slide" |
| 11. | "A Fine Line" |
| 12. | "Like My Tractor" |

== Certifications ==
Certifications for Lik My Trakter
| Region | Certification | Certified units/sales |
|---|---|---|
| Canada (Music Canada) | Gold | 50,000^{^} |
^{^} Shipments figures based on certification alone.
