= Barbara Lynch =

- Origin: Toronto, Ontario, Canada
- Occupation: Musician/singer/songwriter
- Years active: 1996-
- Labels: Duke Street Records

Barbara Lynch is a musician/singer/songwriter from Toronto, Ontario, Canada. Her first album, Goodbye and Goodluck, was released by Duke Street Records in 1996. Lynch self-produced her second album, In the Nickelodeon. It was released in 2008 under GDA Records and then in 2009 become a part of the new Cowboy Junkies' record label, Latent Recordings, distributed by MapleMusic.

== Albums ==
=== Goodbye and Goodluck (1996 - Duke Street Records) ===
- 1. Take It A Day at a Time
- 2. Nobody Thought That It Would
- 3. Suicide
- 4. Flowers Outside
- 5. Puppet Girl
- 6. When You Kiss Me
- 7. There Wasn't Enough For You
- 8. Storybook
- 9. This House
- 10. Lullaby
- 11. The Best That You Can

Produced by David Travers-Smith. All songs written by Barbara Lynch except #10 by Lynch/Traditional. Musicians on the album: Barbara Lynch, Rich Greenspoon, David Travers-Smith, Rich Pell, Christopher Plock, Uli Bohnet, Oliver Shroer, George Koller, Roman Borys.

=== In the Nickelodeon (2008 - GDA Records) ===
- 1. We Go Back a Long Long Way
- 2. Someday You'll Dance
- 3. Will You Ever Care For Me
- 4. Go Easy On Him
- 5. New Orleans Is Drownin'
- 6. Nickelodeon
- 7. As Soon As I Make Enough Money
- 8. Wagon Lament
- 9. Doomsday Clock
- 10. Take Me For A Ride
- 11. Missing You
- 12. Daddy Ain't Dead
- 13. Saturday Nights

Self-produced with assistance of Eric Brown and John Timmins. All songs written by Barbara Lynch except #6 and #9 by Lynch/Traditional. Engineered by Eric Brown at GDA Studios. Musicians on the album include Eric Brown, Christopher Plock, John Timmins, Katherine Wheatley and John Wojewoda.
