= Liv (Waltons album) =

Liv is a live album recorded by the Waltons. According to the insert, it was recorded live on February 23 and 24, 2001 at Ted's Wrecking Yard in Toronto, Ontario, Canada. It was rated four stars by AllMusic.

== Track listing ==
1. Wascana
2. Colder Than You
3. Soother
4. Michaelangelo's Tummy
5. Steel In Your Heart
6. Naked Rain
7. Middle of Nowhere
8. Simple Brian
9. Cold Rails
10. Beats The Hell...
11. Tear Stained Eye
12. Saskatoon Pie
13. In The Mean Time
14. End Of The World
15. Empire On The Plains
16. Bring Everything
17. Silver Lining
18. Glorious Old Shame
