= Calling All Angels (Jane Siberry song) =

Single by Jane Siberry

from the album Until the End of the World
- Released: 1991
- Genre: Art pop, dream pop
- Length: 5:11
- Label: Reprise
- Songwriter: Jane Siberry
- Producer: Jane Siberry

Jane Siberry singles chronology
"Map of the World (Part II)" (1985)	"Calling All Angels" (1991)	"Sail Across the Water" (1993)

"Calling All Angels" is a song by the Canadian singer-songwriter Jane Siberry. It features additional vocals by fellow Canadian singer-songwriter k.d. lang. The song was first released on the soundtrack for the 1991 Wim Wenders film Until the End of the World, and subsequently appeared on Siberry's 1993 studio album When I Was a Boy.

The song appears in the final scene and on the soundtrack for the film Pay It Forward. It also plays over the end credits of the 2021 film The Many Saints of Newark. In television, the song features in Season 2, Episode 10 of Roswell, in the first season finale of Charmed, in Season 4, Episode 1 of the television series The Fosters, in Season 1 of The Chair on Netflix, and plays over the end credits of Season 2, Episode 10 of Deadwood.

Relatedly, in Six Feet Under, in episode 6 of Season 5, one of the main characters (Ruth Fisher) takes part in an improvised, harmonic version of this song, following the death of one of her sister Sarah's closest friends. Many fans of the show consider this one of the most emotional moments in the entire series.

In 2026, a cover of the song was released by Amy Millan and Martha Wainwright, shortly after the two musicians completed a tour together.

== Formats and track listing ==
All songs written by Jane Siberry.

US 1991 single (PRO-CD-5398)

1. "Calling All Angels" (edit) – 4:12
2. "Calling All Angels" – 5:11

Canadian 2001 single (SHE009)

1. "Calling All Angels" – 5:42
2. "Are You Burning, Little Candle? (A Love Song to Children)" – 5:44

== Charts ==
Chart (1992)	Peak position
Canada Adult Contemporary (RPM)	8

== Personnel ==
Adapted from the Calling All Angels liner notes.

- Teddy Borowiecki – piano
- k.d. lang – vocals
- Ben Mink – viola
- Ken Myhr – guitar
- Jane Siberry – vocals, guitar, piano, keyboards, production

== Release history ==
Region	Date	Label	Format	Catalog
United States	1991	Reprise	CD	PRO-CD-5398
Canada	2001	Sheeba	CD	SHE009
