= Teenager (Jane Siberry album) =

Studio album by Jane Siberry
- Released: June 23, 1996
- Genre: Contemporary folk Singer-songwriter
- Length: 63:20
- Label: Sheeba
- Producer: Jane Siberry

Jane Siberry chronology
Maria (1995)	Teenager (1996)	A Day in the Life (1997)

Professional ratings
Review scores
Source	Rating
AllMusic	2.5/5 stars
The Encyclopedia of Popular Music	3/5 stars
MusicHound Rock: The Essential Album Guide	3/5 stars

Teenager is a 1996 album by Jane Siberry.

It was her first release for Sheeba Records, the independent label she established for herself after the end of her contract with Reprise Records. The album is composed of songs that Siberry had written as a teenager, but had never subsequently released on record.

== Critical reception ==
The Dallas Observer called the album "13 supple, unadorned songs," writing that "lovely, reflective tunes like 'Puppet City' and 'Viking Heart' offer thrillingly adult looks at, respectively, emotional paralysis and the enticements of a handsome, attentive stranger."

== Track listing ==
1. "Introduction" – 0:27
2. "The Squirrel Crossed the Road" – 5:13
3. "Let's Not Talk Now" – 4:05
4. "Song to My Father" – 4:54
5. "Broken Birds" – 5:09
6. "Puppet City" – 4:28
7. "Oh My Sister" – 3:56
8. "The Long Pirouette" – 4:33
9. "Bessie" – 3:37
10. "We Should Be There by Morning" – 4:17
11. "Viking Heart" – 6:24
12. "When Spring Comes" – 3:25
13. "Angel Voyeur" – 5:50
14. "Trumpeter Swan" – 5:56
