= Jane Siberry (album) =

Studio album by Jane Siberry
- Released: 1981
- Recorded: 1980–1981
- Studio: Inception Sound Studios, Toronto
- Genre: Contemporary folk
- Length: 38:18
- Label: Street Records/East Side Digital
- Producer: Jane Siberry, David Bradstreet, Carl Keesee

Jane Siberry chronology
Jane Siberry (1981)	No Borders Here (1984)

Professional ratings
Review scores
Source	Rating
Allmusic	3/5 stars

Jane Siberry is the self-titled 1981 debut album by Jane Siberry. The album was re-released on CD by East Side Records in 1994.

Siberry did not yet display the new wave pop style that would make her a household name in Canada with her next album, 1984's No Borders Here. Instead, it's a largely folk-pop album, which has been described by Stewart Mason as "Joni Mitchell's early-'70s albums viewed through a post-punk prism".

== Track listing ==
All songs written by Jane Siberry.

1. "Marco Polo" – 3:04
2. "This Girl I Know" – 2:17
3. "The Sky Is So Blue" – 4:10
4. "The Mystery at Ogwen's Farm" – 2:57
5. "The Magic Beads" – 6:42
6. "Writers Are a Funny Breed" – 5:30
7. "The Strange Well" – 4:53
8. "Above the Treeline" – 4:26
9. "In the Blue Light" – 4:19

== Personnel ==
- Jane Siberry – vocals, harmonies, guitar, piano, synthesizer
- Carl Keesee – bass, clarinet
- John Switzer – bass, backing vocals
- David Bradstreet – electric 12-string guitar, kick drum, backing vocals
- David Houghton – drums
- Trevor Ferrier – congas on "The Strange Well"
- Bruce Fowler – synthesizer on "The Magic Beads"
- Brenda Scott, Goldie Sherman, Sarah Farquhar – backing vocals

Technical

- Chad Irschick – mixing
- Brenda Scott – design, graphics
- John Switzer – photography
