= Alexandra Raffé =

Canadian film producer (born 1955)

Alexandra Raffé (born July 28, 1955) is a Canadian film and television producer. Among her projects are the films Zero Patience and I've Heard the Mermaids Singing, for which she was nominated for a Genie Award in 1987 for Best Picture.
