= Sail Across the Water =

Single by Jane Siberry

from the album When I Was a Boy
- Released: 1993
- Genre: Art pop, dream pop
- Length: 5:22
- Label: Reprise
- Songwriter: Jane Siberry
- Producers: Michael Brook, Brian Eno, Jane Siberry

Jane Siberry singles chronology
"Calling All Angels" (1991)	"Sail Across the Water" (1993)

"Sail Across the Water" is a song by the Canadian singer-songwriter Jane Siberry. It is the only single released in support of her sixth album When I Was a Boy, issued in 1993.

== Formats and track listing ==
All songs written by Jane Siberry.

US CD single (PRO-CD-6259)

1. "Sail Across the Water" (edit) – 4:12
2. "Sail Across the Water" (Brian Eno edit) – 5:11

== Charts ==
Chart (1993)	Peak position
Canada Top Singles (RPM)	66

== Personnel ==
Adapted from the Sail Across the Water liner notes.

- Jane Siberry – vocals, guitar, piano, keyboards, production

Musicians

- Ken Myhr – guitar
- James Pinker – drums

Production and additional personnel

- Michael Brook – production, mixing
- Brian Eno – production, synthesizer

== Release history ==
Region	Date	Label	Format	Catalog
United States	1993	Reprise	CD	PRO-CD-6259
