= Count Your Blessings (compilation album) =

Christmas album by Canadian artists

Live album by Jane Siberry, Holly Cole, Rebecca Jenkins, Mary Margaret O'Hara and Victoria Williams
- Recorded: 1993
- Genre: Christmas music
- Label: CBC Records

Count Your Blessings is a 1994 Christmas album, taking its title from the song of the same name included as its first track, presenting a concert recorded by Jane Siberry, Holly Cole, Rebecca Jenkins, Mary Margaret O'Hara and Victoria Williams. The concert was broadcast on CBC Radio in Canada, and National Public Radio in the United States, in 1993.

The concert presented a program of traditional Christmas music, both well-known standards and lesser-known songs. It also included three original Christmas-themed songs written by the artists themselves: O'Hara's "Never, No", Siberry's "Are You Burning, Little Candle?" and Williams' "A Holy Thing".

== Track listing ==
No.	Title	Performers	Length
1.	"Count Your Blessings"	Cole, Jenkins, Siberry	3:19
2.	"Please Come Home for Christmas"	Cole	2:35
3.	"White Christmas"	O'Hara	2:46
4.	"Un Flambeau, Jeanette, Isabelle"	Cole, Jenkins, Siberry	3:38
5.	"What Is This Fragrance?"	O'Hara	2:15
6.	"Have Yourself a Merry Little Christmas"	Williams	3:12
7.	"Carol of the Bells"	Jenkins	3:07
8.	"Never, No"	O'Hara	2:05
9.	"I'll Be Home for Christmas"	Jenkins	3:07
10.	"Are You Burning, Little Candle?"	Siberry	2:43
11.	"Deck the Halls"	Cole	2:41
12.	"A Holy Thing"	Williams	3:37
13.	"In the Bleak Midwinter"	Siberry	4:27
14.	"Silent Night"		5:25
