= Child: Music for the Christmas Season =

Live album by Jane Siberry
- Released: October 12, 1997
- Recorded: December 17 & 18, 1996
- Venues: The Bottom Line, New York City
- Label: Sheeba
- Producer: Jane Siberry

Jane Siberry chronology
A Day in the Life (1997)	Child: Music for the Christmas Season (1997)	Lips: Music for Saying It (1999)

Professional ratings
Review scores
Source	Rating
Allmusic	2.5/5 stars
Uncut	4/5 stars

Child: Music for the Christmas Season is a 1997 live double album by Jane Siberry.

It presents material she recorded at two 1996 concerts at the famed New York City club The Bottom Line. The material includes both original songs by Siberry and covers of Christmas standards.

The concerts were two of four she performed at The Bottom Line. The other two appear on the albums Lips: Music for Saying It and Tree: Music for Films and Forests. All of the albums have also been released as the New York City Trilogy box set.

== Track listing ==
1. "She's Paying the Taxidriver" – 0:28
2. "Caravan" – 5:12
3. "Wildwood Carol" – 4:54
4. "A Bitter Christmas" – 0:54
5. "What is This Fragrance Softly Stealing?" – 4:59
6. "Quoi, Ma Voisine, Es-Tu Fachée?" – 3:23
7. "Shir Amami" – 6:55
8. "Mary's Lullaby" – 3:12
9. "New Year's Baby" – 4:31
10. "An Angel Stepped Down (and Slowly Looked Around)" – 5:41
11. "Silent Night" – 1:25
12. "You Will Be Born" – 3:33
13. "O Holy Night" – 2:28
14. "In the Bleak Midwinter" – 5:55
15. "Christmas Mass" – 2:40
16. "The Christmas Song" – 2:55
17. "Maria Wanders Through the Thorn" – 4:56
18. "What Child is This?" – 3:15
19. "The Valley" – 5:23
20. "Hockey" – 8:00
21. "The Twelve Days of Christmas" – 5:27
22. "Are You Burning, Little Candle?" – 4:59
