= Cherie Camp =

Canadian musician

Cherie Camp is a Canadian musician. She is most noted as cowriter with John Welsman of "Oh Love", a song from the film Nurse.Fighter.Boy which won the Genie Award for Best Original Song at the 30th Genie Awards.

The daughter of journalist Dalton Camp, she studied music and theatre at Queen's University before starting her musical career in the late 1970s with Welsman and Jeff Kahnert in a folk band called Available Space. Kahnert left the band in 1980, and their style then evolved toward jazz and blues music. In 1982, she had an acting role in Necessary Angel Theatre's production of Richard Wolfe's play Passchendaele.

In 1983 she released a self-titled pop album on WEA Records. In this era, Liam Lacey of The Globe and Mail wrote that Camp was an excellent songwriter, but that she lacked authority and charisma as a performer.

In the late 1980s Camp performed backing vocals on Jane Siberry's albums The Walking and Bound by the Beauty, acted in Siberry's short film The Bird in the Gravel and Peter Mettler's feature film The Top of His Head, and performed vocals for some music in Patricia Rozema's film White Room. In the early 1990s, she performed with Gwen Swick and Shirley Eikhard in the trio The Three Marias.

By the 2000s she had largely retired from the music business, but remained an occasional songwriting collaborator with Welsman. In 2024 she released Love and Blood, her second full-length album.
