= Waltons (band) =

Canadian folk rock band

The Waltons

Background information
- Origin: Regina, Saskatchewan, Canada
- Genres: Alternative rock, folk rock
- Years active: 1987–2005
- Labels: Warner; Sire
- Past members: Jason Plumb; Keith Nakonechny; David Cooney; Todd Lumley; Steve Pitkin; Sean Bryson; Brent Cojocar

Waltons were a Canadian folk rock band, active primarily in the 1990s. The band released three studio albums during their career, and won a Juno Award for Best New Group at the Juno Awards of 1994.

== History ==
The band was formed in Regina, Saskatchewan in 1987, by vocalist/guitarist Jason Plumb, bassist Keith Nakonechny and drummer David Cooney. The band was originally known as "Neurotic Paperboy", before changing to The Waltons; the name was derived from the fact that Plumb had been given the nickname "Walton" by a bandmate in an earlier musical project, although Plumb sometimes joked that the band hoped to be sued by the producers of the television series The Waltons for the free publicity.

They released two independent demo cassettes, '89 Demonstrations and Demo Sandwich, in 1989 and 1990, before moving to Toronto, Ontario in 1991.

They released their debut album, Lik My Trakter ("like my tractor") independently in 1991. That year, they were nominated for two CFNY-FM CASBY Awards for Most Promising Band and Best Western Canadian Band. They signed to Warner Music Canada, which rereleased Lik My Trakter in 1992. Todd Lumley also joined the band that year, playing keyboards and accordion. The album became their commercial breakthrough, spawning the Top 40 hits "Colder Than You", "In the Meantime" and "The Naked Rain", and won a CASBY Award for Best Debut Album in 1992.

In 1993, the band toured Canada as an opening act for Barenaked Ladies.

In 1994, the band won a Juno Award for Best New Group, as well as a SOCAN Award to mark "In the Meantime" being one of the most-played songs on Canadian radio in the previous year. Also that year they released the Simple Brain EP, which comprised the title track, which the band had written for the film soundtrack Naked in New York, as well as covers of Simon and Garfunkel's "The Boxer" and Weddings Parties Anything's "Under the Clocks".

In 1994, Cooney left the band to pursue other interests, and was replaced by Steve Pitkin for the recording of the band's 1995 album Cock's Crow and by Sean Bryson thereafter. Cock's Crow was produced by Michael Phillip Wojewoda, and included two songs co-written with Spirit of the West's John Mann and Geoffrey Kelly. Wojewoda won the Juno Award for Producer of the Year for his work on the Waltons' song "End of the World" and Ashley MacIsaac's "Beaton's Delight".

In 1998, the band released Empire Hotel. A live album, Liv, was released in 2001, following which the band went on hiatus; after four years of inactivity, during which Plumb recorded the solo album Under & Over, the Waltons formally broke up after headlining a final Canada Day show at Regina's Wascana Centre in 2005.

Plumb subsequently launched the new band Jason Plumb and the Willing, whose albums included Beauty in This World (2007) and Wide Open Music (2009), the latter of which included both new songs and some rerecordings of Waltons songs.

On the 2007 Rheostatics tribute album The Secret Sessions, Plumb appeared with Barenaked Ladies on a live version of "Legal Age Life at Variety Store".

== Discography ==
- 89 Demonstrations (1989)
- Demo Sandwich (1990)
- Lik My Trakter (1992)
- Simple Brain (1994)
- Cock's Crow (1995)
- Empire Hotel (1998)
- Liv (2001)
