= Jason Plumb =

Canadian singer

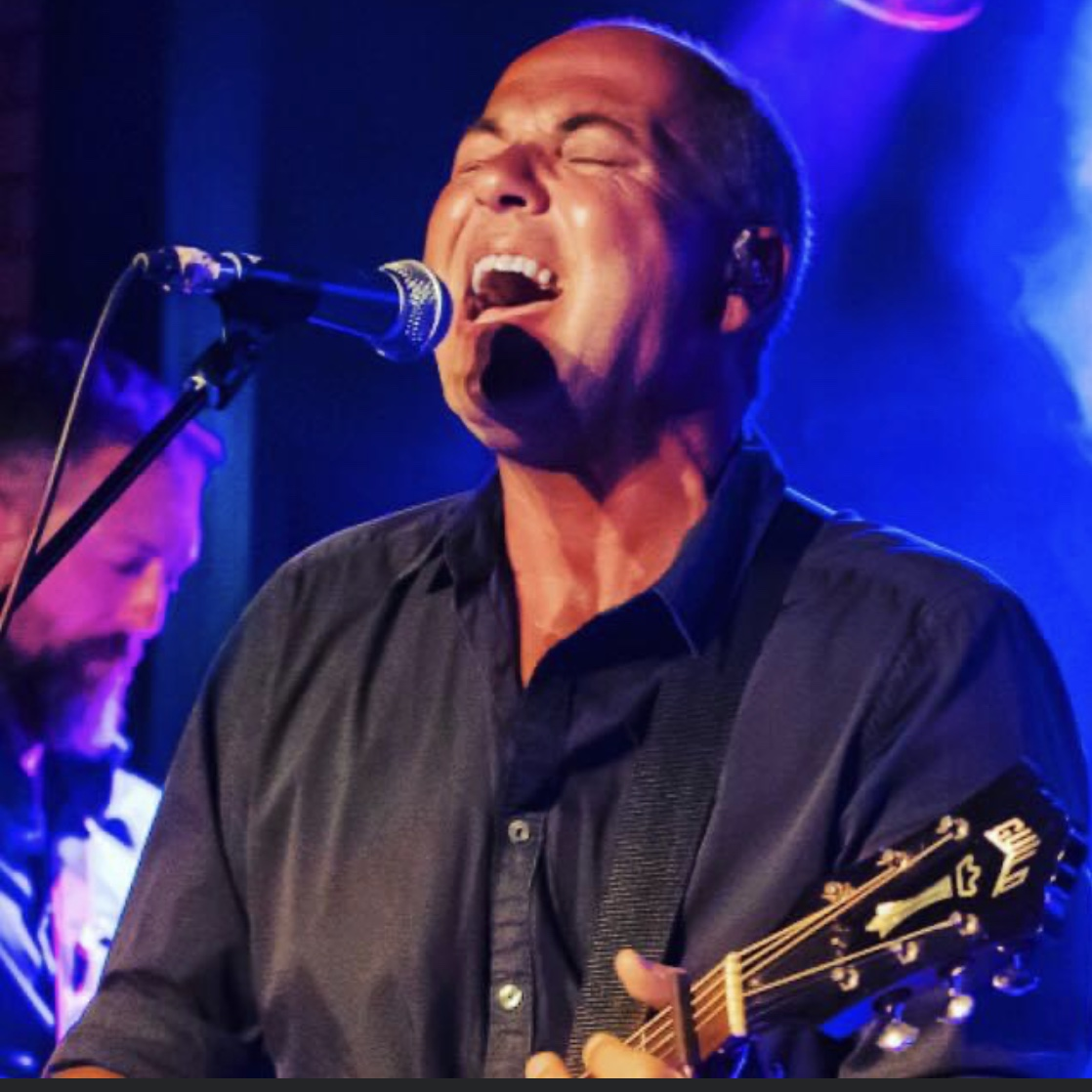
- Plumb performing live in 2018

Background information
- Origin: Canada
- Occupations: Singer-songwriter, record producer
- Label: Windrow Entertainment
- Formerly of: Waltons
- Website: www.jasonplumb.com

Jason Forrest Plumb is a Canadian singer-songwriter, record producer, and mixer who resides in Regina, Saskatchewan and was the lead singer and front man of the Waltons. He currently performs as a solo singer-songwriter with a backing band, The Willing. Also is a singer, guitarist and keyboardist in FOGDOG and El Guitaro (Cover bands featuring members of The Willing).

Plumb is influenced by strong melodies of 1970s music such as those of Elton John, Bread, Billy Joel, Supertramp, and KISS.

In 2003, Plumb released a solo album, Under and Over. Plumb's solo effort was produced by Barenaked Ladies frontman Ed Robertson, who also co-wrote the tracks "Satellite" and "Loved Inconsistently" with Plumb. On the album, Plumb was backed by Robertson's friends Ian LeFeuvre, Maury Lafoy and Peter von Althen, formerly of the band Starling. Plumb formed a backing band known as "The Willing" to tour promoting the record.

He released his second album, Beauty in This World, on March 22, 2007. The Willing performed on the album, and the album was credited as by Jason Plumb and The Willing.

Plumb was part of the lineup of performers on "Ships and Dip", a cruise headlined by Barenaked Ladies. The fan cruise took place on the Carnival Legend from January 15 to 19, 2007. He also performed on the second Barenaked Ladies' cruise, "Ships and Dip III", which was held the following year on the Carnival Victory from January 27 – February 1, 2008. Plumb was not on the subsequent "Ships and Dip V", but performed on "Ship and Dip 4" which sailed on the Norwegian Dawn from February 6–11, 2011.

Plumb established Soccermom Records in 2007. The record label serves as a vehicle to release Plumb's recordings.

Plumb recorded "Paint The Whole World Green" for the Saskatchewan Roughriders in 2007. The song is played at Roughrider home games.

Plumb's third album, again billed with The Willing, was Wide Open Music, which was released in 2009. The album contained songs relating to Saskatchewan that spanned Plumb's career, including some from his time with The Waltons, including several songs that had been recorded for promotional use. Plumb and his band re-recorded most of the old songs live or in the studio for the album.

Plumb has acted as a producer for several artists including Colter Wall.

== Solo discography ==
- Under and Over (2003)
- Beauty in This World (2007)
- Wide Open Music (2009)
- Alive & Willing (2011)
- All Is More Than Both (2012)
- Ep_Onymous (2014)
