= Time and Love: The Music of Laura Nyro =

Compilation album by Various artists
- Released: May 13, 1997
- Genre: Pop, folk
- Length: 58:58
- Label: Astor Place

Professional ratings
Review scores
Source	Rating
Allmusic	link

Time and Love: The Music of Laura Nyro is a 1997 tribute album to singer-songwriter Laura Nyro, released shortly after her death of ovarian cancer and released on Astor Place.

Almost all of the artists recorded Nyro's songs. The exception was Jane Siberry, who contributed an original song which combined her own tribute to Nyro with a brief medley of several of her songs.

== Track listing ==
1. Phoebe Snow, "Time and Love" – 4:34
2. Jill Sobule, "Stoned Soul Picnic" – 4:07
3. Suzanne Vega, "Buy and Sell" – 3:17
4. Rosanne Cash, "Save the Country" – 3:14
5. Jane Siberry, "When I Think of Laura Nyro" – 4:28
6. Beth Nielsen Chapman, "Stoney End" – 3:53
7. Lisa Germano, "Eli's Comin'" – 4:27
8. The Roches, "Wedding Bell Blues" – 3:21
9. Sweet Honey in the Rock, "And When I Die" – 2:54
10. Patty Larkin, "Poverty Train" – 4:25
11. Jonatha Brooke, "He's a Runner" – 3:55
12. Holly Cole, "Sweet Blindness" – 5:22
13. Leni Stern, "Upstairs By a Chinese Lamp" – 4:51
14. Dana Bryant, "Woman's Blues" – 6:10
