= Jane Siberry =

Canadian singer-songwriter (born 1955)

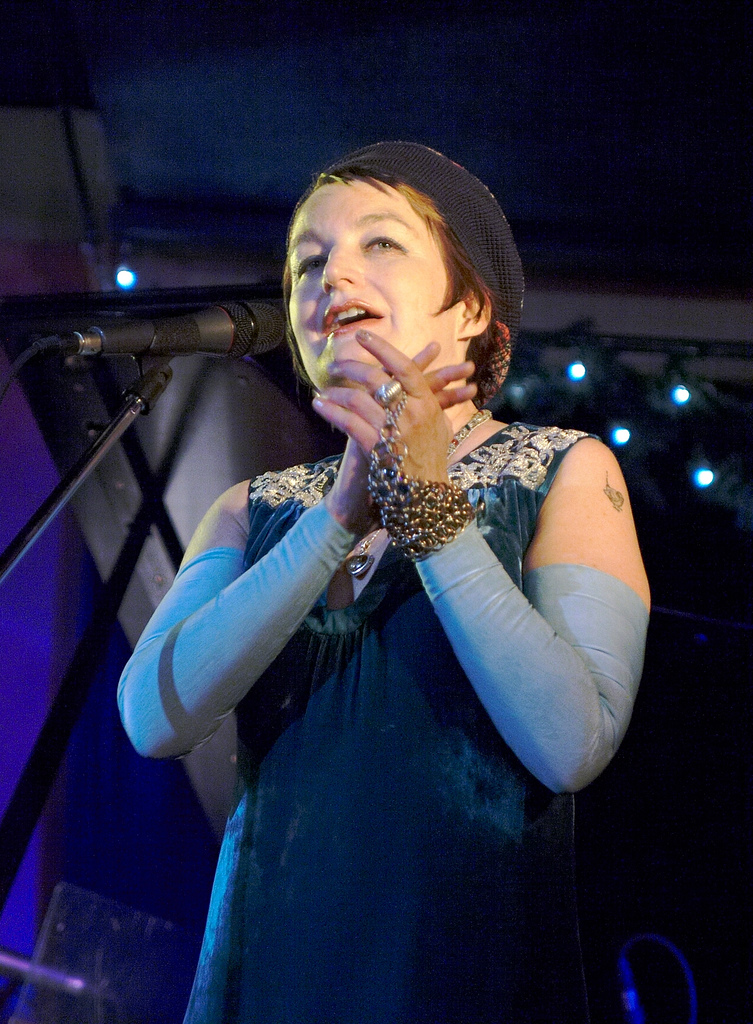
- Siberry on stage in 2007, when her identity was Issa

Background information
- Also known as: Issa
- Born: Jane Stewart; 12 October 1955 (age 70); Toronto, Ontario, Canada
- Origin: Guelph, Ontario, Canada
- Occupations: Singer; songwriter; composer; musician; record producer; poet
- Instruments: Vocals; guitar; keyboards; computer
- Years active: 1981–present
- Labels: Sheeba; Duke Street; Open Air; Windham Hill; Street; East Side Digital; Reprise; Warner Bros.
- Website: janesiberry.com

Jane Siberry (/ˈsɪbəri/ SIB-ər-ee; née Stewart; born 12 October 1955) is a Canadian singer-songwriter, known for such hits as "Mimi on the Beach", "I Muse Aloud", "One More Colour" and "Calling All Angels". She performed the theme song to the television series Maniac Mansion. She has released material under the name "Issa" (/ˈiːsə/ EE-sə) – an identity (as opposed to a simple stagename) which she used formally between 2006 and 2009.

On 30 August 2005, Siberry was awarded the 2005 Victor Martyn Lynch-Staunton Award in music by the Canada Council for the Arts.

== Career history ==
=== Childhood and early years ===
Jane Stewart was born in Toronto in 1955 and was raised in the suburb of Etobicoke. She would take her subsequent surname, "Siberry", from the family name of her maternal aunt and uncle. Many years later, she would explain this choice by stating "this woman and her husband were the first couple I met where I could feel the love between them and I held that in front of me as a reference point."

Siberry learned piano from the age of four, predominantly teaching herself and developing her own concepts of notation and structure. At school she learned conventional music theory (as well as French horn) and taught herself to play guitar by working through Leonard Cohen songs. Her first song was completed at the age of seventeen, although she had been developing song ideas since much earlier.

"I started out in music, but switched to sciences when I realised how much more interesting it was to study than music. I would leave the classes ecstatic about tiny things."

— Jane Siberry on her education

Following high-school graduation from Richview Collegiate in Etobicoke, Ontario, and then the Canadian Junior College, Lausanne, Switzerland, Siberry moved on to study music at the University of Guelph, later switching to microbiology (in which she gained a BSc degree) when she found freshman music courses to be stifling. She began performing in folk clubs in Guelph, linking up first with singer Wendy Davis and then with bass guitarist John Switzer in a group called Java Jive.

=== First three albums and Canadian success (1979–1986) ===
Following the split of Java Jive in 1979, Siberry maintained both a musical and a romantic relationship with John Switzer (who would work with her on her first four records). On leaving university, she supported her work as a solo performer by working as a waitress, earning enough to finance and tour her debut album, the folk-influenced Jane Siberry, which was released in 1981 on Duke Street Records. The album was relatively successful for an independent release, enabling Siberry to sign a three-album deal with A&M Records via the Windham Hill label. As part of the deal, Siberry was able to release her albums on Duke Street Records in Canada while Windham Hill handled American release and distribution.

Assembling a backing band of Switzer, guitarist Ken Myhr, keyboard players Doug Wilde and Jon Goldsmith, and drummer Al Cross, Siberry recorded her second album No Borders Here (released in 1984) for which she mostly abandoned the folk approach in favour of electronic art-pop. This coincided with a growth in support of new wave and independent music within Canadian broadcast media, including the Toronto radio station CFNY and the video channel MuchMusic. Both of these became keen supporters of Siberry and put her onto high playlist rotation.

Siberry's first hit was the No Borders Here track "Mimi on the Beach" – a seven-and-a-half-minute art-rock single which benefited from the art-friendly broadcast support at the time (and from its video made by Siberry and friends). Both factors earned it heavy MuchMusic and college radio play. Two further singles with videos – "You Don't Need" and "I Muse Aloud" – consolidated the success. No Borders Here sold 40,000 copies and won Siberry a CASBY award for Best Female Vocalist, as well as giving her first opportunity to play live in New York.

Siberry's third album, The Speckless Sky (1985), continued her art-pop approach. It was another commercial and critical success, going Gold in Canada by selling over 50,000 units and establishing Siberry as a Canadian pop star. The album provided another hit single, "One More Colour" (with a video featuring Siberry walking a cow) and won the 1985 CASBY for Best Album, with Siberry and Switzer also picking up the award for Best Producer. In 1986 Siberry signed with Warner Brothers subsidiary Reprise Records, which picked up her American contract from Windham Hill, while honouring the existing Canadian arrangement with Duke Street Records.

=== Reprise Records period ===
==== The Walking and Bound By the Beauty (1987–1992) ====
For her fourth album (her first for Reprise) Siberry created The Walking. Released in 1988, it contained a set of intricately structured songs, many of which were lengthy and shifted between narrative viewpoints and characters. Many of the songs dealt with romantic collapse and miscommunication, partially inspired by Siberry's breakup with John Switzer (which happened during the writing and recording of the album). She was marketed as part of the "high art" end of rock music, alongside artists such as Kate Bush or Peter Gabriel. Siberry embarked on a tour of Europe and the United States to promote The Walking. This included her first European performance, which took place at the ICA in London.

In spite of the efforts of both label and artist, The Walking was ultimately less of a commercial success than The Speckless Sky, with Siberry failing to make her mainstream breakthrough. Although the album met with the same critical interest and attention as its predecessor, reviews were noticeably harsher and less welcoming. As well, the album was considered unsuitable by broadcasters for radio airplay, despite the presence of several shorter and more accessible tracks on the album (both the title track and a shorter edit of "Ingrid and the Footman" were released as singles but failed to make an impact).

Despite this setback, Reprise retained Siberry's contract, even taking over the Canadian side of the distribution for her next album, 1989's Bound by the Beauty. Siberry moved towards more simple and direct song forms, jettisoning electronic art-pop in favour of more acoustic styles drawing on country and western and Latin music. While retaining her quirkier conceptual approach, the album's song themes were generally more lighthearted than those of The Walking. Prior to the album's release, Siberry toured various folk festivals (in a duo format with Ken Mhyr on guitar) to reposition herself in the market; Bound by the Beauty had better record sales, and appeared on the RPM Top 100 Albums chart in 1989. In 1990, she embarked on a 50-date tour of Japan, Australia, New Zealand, Britain, the United States and Canada.

By 1991, Siberry had completed demos for her next album: however, this was scrapped when neither Reprise nor Siberry herself were happy with the results, which were deemed too much like Bound by the Beauty. In 1992, during the wait for a new record, Reprise released a Siberry compilation album called Summer in the Yukon for the UK market. This focussed primarily on her more pop-oriented side and featured a remix of the Bound by the Beauty track "The Life is the Red Wagon" with a new dance-friendly rhythm track.

==== When I Was a Boy and Maria (1993–1996) ====
Siberry's sixth album, When I Was a Boy, was completed in 1993 after a three-year writing and recording period during which she'd undergone changes in her personal life and in her musical approach. For the first time she chose to share album production responsibilities with other musicians – in this case Michael Brook and Brian Eno, both of whom also contributed instrumental work to the album. During the recording period, she had also confronted and overcome a longstanding alcohol addiction. She would later consider the music on the record to be more liberated, featuring what she described as "more body in it, more sexual energy... it's about the sacred aspects of sexuality, and finally being able to embrace them and not, em, (just) be an observer anymore."

In contrast to its predecessor, When I Was a Boy was influenced by funk, dance and gospel music and featured extensive use of layering and sampler technology, in line with developments in latterday pop music, trip-hop and R'n'B. It also featured what would become Siberry's best-known song, "Calling All Angels" (a duet with k.d. lang which had first appeared as part of the soundtrack to Wim Wenders' Until the end of the World and as a track on Summer in the Yukon; it was later re-recorded for the Pay It Forward soundtrack). Other contributors on the album included Canadian singers Holly Cole and Rebecca Jenkins and (for the last time) regular guitarist Ken Mhyr. The album introduced the more spiritually-oriented themes that became a hallmark of Siberry's later work and launched three singles – "Calling All Angels", "Sail Across the Water" and "Temple".

Prior to the release of When I Was a Boy, Siberry performed in Edinburgh as the opening act for Mike Oldfield's premiere of Tubular Bells 2. She met with a disastrous rejection by the audience. Initially, Siberry was devastated (later describing herself as having "cried for two weeks") and had to make a serious reassessment of her perspective on her work. From this point onwards, she chose to reclaim her art for herself and decided "I took back all the power back that I had put outside myself trying to please (others). The worst show of my life has become the best show because it's given me the ultimate freedom to care only about what I think is really good. How my career does is secondary."

Siberry would subsequently reassert full control over all areas of her work, from songwriting to stage presentation and video direction. For her promotional tour for When I Was a Boy – which she called "The It Ain't a Concert Concert", she opted not to use a band and instead performed solo, encouraging audience interaction and including spoken-word material (to the puzzlement of critics).

Later in 1993, Siberry collaborated with Holly Cole, Rebecca Jenkins, Mary Margaret O'Hara and Victoria Williams on a live concert of Christmas music, which was broadcast on CBC Radio on Christmas Day that year before being released in 1994 as the album Count Your Blessings.

During 1994 Siberry recorded sporadically, without constructing a new album. She came to the attention of a new audience when her song "It Can't Rain All the Time" was included on the soundtrack for the movie The Crow; time spent with Peter Gabriel at Real World Studios resulted in three more songs (not released for another seven years) and she sang on the Indigo Girls album Swamp Ophelia.

Siberry's next release was another complete change of direction. In contrast to the intricate studio production of When I Was a Boy, Maria (released in 1995) featured a more jazz-inspired direction with live acoustic instrumentation and approaches similar to Van Morrison's Astral Weeks. The basic tracks to the album were recorded in three days flat by a group featuring Tim Ray (pianist for jazz band Orange then Blue), Betty Carter's double bass player Christopher Thomas, top jazz session drummer Brian Blade and trumpeter David Travers-Smith (with Siberry playing electric guitar and singing). She edited and reworked the recorded material into fully realized songs, most of which featured various perspectives on innocence. The album also featured a 20-minute extended conceptual work called "Oh My My". Siberry took this new band on tour across Canada and the United States and professed herself pleased with the results, but Reprise Records were less pleased with the album sales.

After Maria, Siberry parted company with Reprise Records, later stating "they wanted me to work with a producer and that severed any sense of loyalty. I realized they truly didn't understand what I was doing... so I took my leave."

=== Sheeba Records period ===
==== New York period (1996–1997) ====
In 1996, Siberry founded her own Toronto-based independent label, Sheeba Records, on which she has released all of her subsequent material. Although her public profile became lower once she became an independent artist, she retained a devoted cult following. Her first Sheeba release was Teenager (1996), an album of songs which she had originally written during her teenage years and which she had recorded during the Maria sessions (taking advantage of the fact that the sessions had been completed with studio time left over). Leaving the Sheeba Records office to continue its work in Toronto, Siberry herself then relocated to New York City in search of new inspiration.

In 1996, she performed four concerts at the city's famous Bottom Line jazz club – all of which were recorded and released on a set of live albums between 1997 and 1999, collectively known as the "New York City Trilogy". The first of these was 1997's Child: Music for the Christmas Season, a double album which combined Christmas standards and carols (such as "O Holy Night" and "In the Bleak Midwinter") and original Siberry songs containing religious imagery (such as "An Angel Stepped Down...")

Siberry had also demonstrated the greater creative freedom she had as an independent recording artist via her other 1997 album, A Day in the Life. This was her most unconventional release to date – although it did feature song excerpts, it was predominantly a sound collage representation of a typical day's experience by Siberry in New York. The album was filled with recordings of yoga classes, phone messages and street sounds; and featured conversations and exchanges with a wide variety of people – cab drivers, friends, fellow students and Siberry's then-current musical collaborators Patty Larkin, Joe Jackson, k.d. lang and Darol Anger.

Also in 1997, Siberry's former label Reprise Records released a second compilation album of her work, A Collection 1984–1989, aimed at the Canadian and American markets, and drew from the whole range of Siberry's output prior to When I Was a Boy.

==== Toronto period (1997–2005) ====
With Sheeba running into financial problems, Siberry left New York, returned to Toronto and reestablished her label as a one-woman operation (handling everything from songwriting to envelope-stuffing). To finance Sheeba, she also began to experiment with what were then seen as unorthodox promotional ideas, such as the weekend-long "Siberry Salons" (a concert-cum-seminar featuring two performances plus a workshop and dinner, which were hosted at intimate and unusual venues such as art galleries and loft apartments). Sheeba now also sold soft toys and auctioned off collectible career-related items such as signed lyric sheets, her first guitar and even the pink bra which she had worn on the cover of Maria.

Siberry took two years to restore Sheeba's precarious fortunes, during which she kept busy. Her first book of prose-poems, S W A N, was published by Sheeba in 1998, the same year that she toured as one of the acts on the female-oriented "Suffragette Sessions" tour, alongside Indigo Girls, Lisa Germano and members of Luscious Jackson and the Breeders. A second book, One Room Schoolhouse, followed in 1999. In the same year, Siberry released the second and third volumes of the New York concert recordings. Lips: Music for Saying It was based around themes of communication (and included a "Mimi"-sung riposte to 1984's "Mimi on the Beach"). Tree: Music for Films and Forests documented a concert in which Siberry had sung songs linked by the concept of trees, as well as adding a couple of songs she'd contributed to film scores. The complete trilogy was reissued as a three album box set the same year.

Siberry's tenth studio album, Hush was released in 2000. This was a predominantly acoustic record consisting entirely of cover versions in which Siberry explored traditional American and Celtic folk and gospel songs such as "Jacobs Ladder", "Ol' Man River" and "Streets of Laredo". She released a third book via Sheeba in 2000, New Year's Baby. The following year's City album compiled various non-album tracks, rarities and collaborations between Siberry and other musicians. As well as providing another home for "Calling All Angels", the album included work with Nigel Kennedy, Peter Gabriel, Hector Zazou and Joe Jackson and featured "All the Pretty Ponies" (a children's song which Siberry had contributed to the Barney's Big Adventure soundtrack).

In 2002, Love is Everything: The Jane Siberry Anthology was released on Rhino Records: a double-CD album combining material from her Duke Street, Reprise and Sheeba eras and summarizing the first twenty-one years of her career. This was followed in 2003 by Shushan the Palace: Hymns of Earth – another Christmas-themed album of cover versions. This time, Siberry performed her own interpretations of liturgical Christmas hymns by various classical and Romantic composers including Mendelssohn, Bach, Holst and Handel.

Despite her apparent productivity, Siberry was continuing to find her independent career and business efforts to be challenging and problematic. The live albums were in part an inexpensive tactic to enable her to gain resources to record her original work. She would later confess "I really thought it was going to be much, much easier. The whole label thing. It wasn't. Those records, Shushan and Hush, were to pay for studio time."

==== "Issa" period (2006–2009) ====
Early in 2006, Siberry closed her Sheeba office, then auctioned and sold nearly all of her possessions via eBay – including her Toronto home and her musical instruments. She retained one travelling guitar, but none of the other instruments featured on her albums and in her concerts. In 2006, she told The Globe and Mail that she had kept a very few precious possessions, including her Miles Davis CDs, in storage.

"I felt the need to make some strong changes in my life. It seemed important to change my name, so I did. I changed it to a name that I thought was simple, an empty cup. I had never heard the name Issa before, and it turns out to have some wonderful meanings, including a haiku poet in Japan, and the name that Jesus had in India. But two weeks ago I officially changed my name back to Jane Siberry. I felt with the name change, I had gotten in my own way, in terms of devoting myself to my career, making my work available to people. So, Jane Siberry is my name again until further notice, but I feel richer from having been Issa for three years."

— Jane Siberry, explaining her time as "Issa" in 2009

On 3 June 2006, somewhere in northwestern Europe, Siberry changed her name to Issa: revealing this change of identity to the public a couple of weeks later on 24 June 2006. She told The Globe and Mail that she chose the name Issa as a feminine variant of Isaiah. She stated that her older music would remain available for sale under the name "Jane Siberry", but her new material would be released as Issa. At the time she also stated, regarding the change of identity, "I had to do it right. I had to be serious about it and I had to convey that. When I put Jane away, I went silent for 24 hours. Not a word to anyone. And then Issa from that point on."

Later she would describe the process of choosing a new identity in terms of changing her writing approach – "Moving into Issa, I didn't know if I'd be in the music business any more. I just started writing. I wanted to let go of any expectations and just try to get closer to what I heard in my head... I just tried to write as precisely as I could to what I heard in my head. I slowed everything down and took one note at a time, and just waited until I heard the next note." The process was evidently successful, resulting in thirty-three songs written in thirty-three days.

On 4 July 2006, Issa gave a lecture at University of British Columbia in Vancouver on the topic of "Cracking the Egg: A Look from the Inside". She began with a poetic meditation on science and life, and then opened the floor up to questions from the audience. She talked about her recent adventures in decommodifying her life, her change in name, and her new conception of herself as an artist. Over 2006 and 2007, she documented the process of recording some thirty new songs in her journal, posted on her MySpace page and on her new website.

In autumn 2008 Issa finalized the ideas for a trilogy of albums to be called the "Three Queens" sequence. The first of these – Dragon Dreams – was the debut Issa release, on 12 December 2008. As with the previous Jane Siberry material, it was released on Sheeba: Issa had retained the label despite slimming down its operations. In 2009, Issa released the second album in the "Three Queens" trilogy, With What Shall I Keep Warm? However, it was plain that her identity was no longer fixed, as both of the names she'd used as a musician – "Issa" and "Jane Siberry" – were included on the cover. In December 2009, she notified her fans that she had recently changed her name from Issa back to Jane Siberry, feeling that the process of working under a different name had run its course.

==== Later work (2010–present) ====
Inspired by the dichotomy between frequent e-mails from devoted international fans asking her to play a concert in their city and her difficulty in finding a suitable concert promoter, Siberry launched a "microtour" through her fan mailing list in 2010, in which she offered to play small venues – ranging from intimate cafés to fans' own homes – in any location in Europe where one or more fans could organize a space, an audience of about 20 to 30 people and a night of accommodation.

In May 2010, Siberry made her entire back catalogue of music available as free downloads in MP3 and AIFF formats. She had previously employed a flexible pricing policy, stating "I started feeling weird about holding back anything people wanted because of the money. It just felt wrong to my stomach, so I made a flexible interface so people could take it with whatever reasoning they felt was right, and I didn't have to worry about it any more."

In March 2011, Siberry advised her fans through her mailing list that the third album of the "Three Queens" trilogy was almost ready (having been "nearly completed" several times before), and that she intended to release a fourth disc as part of the collection. The album, Meshach Dreams Back, was released later in 2011 and was the first album to be credited to "Jane Siberry" for eight years.

In 2014 Siberry used crowdfunding to raise funds to produce Ulysses' Purse, a limited edition CD. Siberry is featured in the Corey Hart single "10,000 Horses", which was released on 8 April 2014.

Her 1985 album The Speckless Sky won the jury vote for the Polaris Heritage Prize at the 2025 Polaris Music Prize. In her acceptance speech she announced the forthcoming release of In the Thicket of Our Own Unconsciousness, her first new album since 2016.

In the same year, she was inducted into the Canadian Songwriters Hall of Fame.

== Musical style and commercial approach ==
Siberry's music is most commonly compared to artists such as Laura Nyro, Joni Mitchell, Kate Bush, Toyah Willcox, Anna Domino, Suzanne Vega and Laurie Anderson. She has drawn from a wide variety of styles, ranging from new wave rock on her earlier albums to a reflective pop style influenced by jazz, folk, gospel, classical and liturgical music in her later work. She has cited Van Morrison and Miles Davis as being strong creative influences.

Siberry has often criticized the competitive power of commercial radio and the recording industry. In 2005, she pioneered a self-determined pricing policy through her website on which the purchaser is given the choices of: standard price (about US$0.99/track); pay now, self-priced; pay later, self-priced; or "a gift from Jane". In an interview with The Globe and Mail, Siberry confirmed that since she had instituted the self-determined pricing policy, the average income she receives per song from Sheeba customers is in fact slightly more than standard price.

== Television performances ==
Siberry in concert at Le Spectrum, Montreal in her TV Special Jane Siberry, I Muse Aloud (1987)

Siberry performed "Map of the World, Pt.1" from her second album No Borders Here at the Juno Awards broadcast live on CBC Television on December 5, 1984. She was nominated as Best Promising Female Vocalist of the Year.

Siberry was the subject of two award-winning documentaries directed by Don Allan and produced by Bruce Glawson and Arnie Zipursky of Cambium Productions. The half-hour special, Jane Siberry, One More Colour premiered on CBC Television on March 27, 1987. It featured a concert taped at Montreal’s Le Spectrum club, with behind-the-scenes footage of the filming of the second version of her "One More Colour" music video directed by DEVO's Gerald Casale. It also included Siberry touring in Los Angeles and San Francisco with singer Rebecca Jenkins, drummer Al Cross, guitarist Ken Myhr, singer Gina Stepaniuk, keyboardist Anne Bourne, bassist John Switzer, and manager Bob Blumer. The animated portrait of Siberry in the opening title sequence was designed by artist Donald Roberston. The half-hour special won the Gold Medal, Music Video Longform, at the International Film & TV Festival of New York and the Silver Award for Music Promotion Tapes – Female Vocalist at the Houston International Film & Festival, both in 1987.

Jane Siberry, I Muse Aloud, a one-hour special, premiered on TVOntario on October 19, 1987. The longer documentary had additional material directed by Michael McNamara, including Siberry recording her album The Walking in studio. The hour special won the Silver Medal for Popular Music & Variety Entertainment Special at the International Film & TV Festival of New York in 1987, (Note: Jane Siberry, I Muse Aloud tied with HBO's Barbra Streisand: One Voice within the same category at the 30th Annual International Film & TV Festival of New York in 1987) the Gold Hugo Award for Variety/Entertainment – Television Production at the Chicago International Film Festival in 1988, and the Gemini Award for Best Editing in a Comedy, Variety or Performing Arts Program or Series in 1988.

Siberry was a featured artist in the one-hour special Standards produced by Jeremy Podeswa and Ingrid Veninger and directed by Podeswa. It premiered on Sunday Arts Entertainment on CBC Television in 1992. The special, which was inspired by David Ramsden’s Quiet Please! There’s a Lady on Stage also featured Cherie Camp, Holly Cole, Laura Hubert, Molly Johnson, Sarah McLachlan, Maggie Moore, and David Ramsden. Siberry performed Alberta Hunter’s "The Love I Have For You."

Siberry appeared in the 1993 and 1994 Kumbaya Festivals, an HIV and AIDS benefit organized by Molly Johnson and telecast live on MuchMusic.

In 1994, Siberry sang to a live orchestral arrangement of "Love is Everything" in honour of Robert Lepage, the recipient of the National Arts Centre Award at the third annual Governor-General’s Performing Arts Awards. The television special of the Gala premiered on CBC Television on January 1, 1995.

== Discography ==
=== Albums ===
==== Studio albums ====
- Jane Siberry (1981)
- No Borders Here (1984)
- The Speckless Sky (1985)
- The Walking (1987)
- Bound by the Beauty (1989)
- When I Was a Boy (1993)
- Maria (1995)
- Teenager (1996)
- A Day in the Life (1997)
- Hush (2000)
- Shushan the Palace: Hymns of Earth (2003)
- Dragon Dreams (as Issa) (2008)
- With What Shall I Keep Warm? (as Issa/Jane Siberry) (2009)
- Meshach Dreams Back (2011)
- Ulysses' Purse (2016)
- Angels Bend Closer (2016)
- In the Thicket of Our Own Unconsciousness (2025)

==== Live albums ====
- Count Your Blessings (1994, live, performances by Jane Siberry, Holly Cole, Rebecca Jenkins, Mary Margaret O'Hara and Victoria Williams)
- Child: Music for the Christmas Season (1997, live)
- Lips: Music for Saying It (1999, live)
- Tree: Music for Films and Forests (1999, live)
- A World Without Music (2020, digital purchase via website only)

==== Compilations ====
- Summer in the Yukon (1992) – UK-only "best of"
- A Collection 1984-1989 (1995) – North American "best-of"
- New York City Trilogy (1999) – 4-CD box set of live albums '"Tree'", '"Child'" and '"Lips"'
- City (2001) – Collaborations, non-album tracks and rarities
- Love is Everything: The Jane Siberry Anthology (2002) – 2-CD "best of", 1981–2002

=== Chart singles ===
Siberry has placed three singles in the Canadian RPM Hot 100:

- "Mimi on the Beach" (1984) – No. 68
- "One More Colour" (1985) – No. 27
- "Sail Across the Water" (1993) – No. 66

Two other tracks made RPM's Adult Contemporary charts:

- "Map of the World (Part II)" (1986) – No. 17
- "Calling All Angels" (1992) – No. 9

=== Compilation albums ===
Siberry has also contributed tracks to a number of movie soundtracks and compilation albums:

- Until the end of the World, 1991 ("Calling All Angels")
- Kick at the Darkness, 1991 ("A Long Time Love Song", duet with Martin Tielli)
- Toys, 1992 ("Happy Workers (reprise)")
- The Crow, 1994 ("It Can't Rain All the Time")
- Faraway, So Close, 1994 ("Slow Tango")
- Chansons des mers froides, 1994 ("She's Like A Swallow")
- Time and Love: The Music of Laura Nyro, 1997 ("When I Think of Laura Nyro")
- Women Like Us: Lesbian Favorites, 1997 ("Temple")
- Pay It Forward, 1998 ("Calling All Angels")
- Ghostland: Interview with the Angel, 2001 (Judee Sill's "The Kiss")
- Care Bears: Journey to Joke-a-lot, 2004 ("With All Your Heart")
- Whatever: The '90s Pop & Culture Box, 2005 ("Calling All Angels")

== Covers ==
Two Nice Girls recorded a country/folk cover of "Follow Me" on their 1989 debut album 2 Nice Girls.

Her song "One More Colour" was covered by Sarah Polley on the 1997 soundtrack to The Sweet Hereafter, and by the Rheostatics on their Introducing Happiness album.

K.D. Lang covered "The Valley" and "Love Is Everything" on her album Hymns of the 49th Parallel.

Alice covered "Calling All Angels" on her album God Is My DJ in 1999.

Rock Plaza Central covered "You Don't Need"; and "Calling All Angels" was covered by The Wailin' Jennys in 2009.

Kevin Gilbert recorded a piano version of her song "The Taxi Ride" on the album Bolts.

Steven Page with the Art of Time Ensemble recorded The Taxi Ride on the 2009 release A Singer Must Die.

== Guest performances ==
She sings on Bob Wiseman's 1991 Presented By Lake Michigan Soda. She sings "The Bridge" on the Joe Jackson album Heaven & Hell. Jane sang backing vocals on the 1994 Indigo Girls album Swamp Ophelia and on the 2003 Emmylou Harris album Stumble into Grace . In 2014 she duetted with Corey Hart on his EP and the song Ten Thousand Horses.
