= Until the End of the World (soundtrack) =

Until the End of the World: Music from the Motion Picture Soundtrack

Soundtrack album from the film Until the End of the World by various artists
- Released: 10 December 1991
- Genre: Soundtrack
- Length: 69:27
- Label: Warner Bros.

Singles from Until the End of the World: Music from the Motion Picture Soundtrack
- 1. "Sax and Violins" Released: 1991

Professional ratings
Review scores
Source	Rating
AllMusic	4/5 stars
Entertainment Weekly	B+
Los Angeles Times	3/4 stars
NME	7/10
Pitchfork	8.3/10
Rolling Stone	4/5 stars
Vox	8/10

Until the End of the World: Music from the Motion Picture Soundtrack is a soundtrack album to the film of the same name, released in 1991 on Warner Bros. Records.

With one exception, the songs were created specifically for the film and debuted in it, although some appeared on subsequent albums by the participating artists. U2's "Until the End of the World" had been previously released on that band's 1991 album Achtung Baby, albeit in a different version. In commissioning the songs, director Wim Wenders asked the musicians to anticipate the kind of music they would be making a decade later, when the film was set.

== Track listing ==
1. Graeme Revell: "Opening Titles" (Revell) (solo cello performed by David Darling) – 1:59
2. Talking Heads: "Sax and Violins" (David Byrne, Chris Frantz, Jerry Harrison, Tina Weymouth) – 5:18
3. Julee Cruise: "Summer Kisses, Winter Tears" (Jack Lloyd, Ben Weisman, Fred Wise) – 2:37
4. Neneh Cherry: "Move with Me (Dub)" (Cherry, Cameron McVey) – 2:58
5. Crime & the City Solution: "The Adversary" (Bronwyn Adams, Simon Bonney, Chrislo Haas, Alexander Hacke, Mick Harvey, Thomas Stern) – 5:32
6. Lou Reed: "What's Good" (Reed) – 5:07
7. Can: "Last Night Sleep" (Malcolm Mooney, Jaki Liebezeit, Michael Karoli, Irmin Schmidt) – 3:35
8. R.E.M.: "Fretless" (Bill Berry, Peter Buck, Mike Mills, Michael Stipe) (featuring Kate Pierson) – 4:49
9. Elvis Costello: "Days" (Ray Davies) – 4:49
10. Graeme Revell: "Claire's Theme" (Revell) (solo cello performed by David Darling) – 0:51
11. Nick Cave and the Bad Seeds: "(I'll Love You) Till the End of the World" (Nick Cave) – 4:38
12. Patti Smith and Fred "Sonic" Smith: "It Takes Time" (P. Smith, F. Smith) – 5:00
13. Depeche Mode: "Death's Door" (Martin Gore) – 3:53
14. Graeme Revell: "Love Theme" (Revell) (solo cello performed by David Darling) – 0:45
15. Jane Siberry and k.d. lang: "Calling All Angels" (Siberry) – 5:11
16. T-Bone Burnett: "Humans from Earth" (Burnett) – 3:07
17. Daniel Lanois: "Sleeping in the Devil's Bed" (Lanois) – 3:50
18. U2: "Until the End of the World" (Bono, The Edge, Adam Clayton, Larry Mullen Jr.) – 4:33
19. Graeme Revell: "Finale" (Revell) (solo cello performed by David Darling) – 0:58

== Additional music ==
Other music, used in the film, did not appear on the soundtrack album:

- Peter Gabriel: "Blood of Eden" (standard version appeared on his album Us, 1992; the mix for Until the End of the World was included on disc one of a set of "Blood of Eden" CD singles, 1993)
- Robbie Robertson: "Breakin the Rules" (appeared on his album Storyville, 1991)
- Neneh Cherry: "Move with Me" (appeared on her album Homebrew, 1992)
- U2: "Until the End of the World" (The soundtrack album includes a second version of the song, which features a different intro and more percussion. The version used in the film is that appearing on Achtung Baby, 1991.)
- Gondwanaland: "Lagoons" (appeared on their album Wide Skies, 1992)
- Boulevard of Broken Dreams: "Travelin' Light" (appeared on their album It's the Talk of the Town and Other Sad Songs, 1985)
- Chubby Checker: "The Twist"
- Elvis Presley: "Summer Kisses, Winter Tears" (first appeared on the EP Elvis by Request: Flaming Star and 3 Other Great Songs, 1961)
- Laurent Petitgand: "La Vieil Homme de la mer" (English translation "The Old Man from the Sea")

The Aka Pygmy and Indigenous Australian music used in the film are from field recordings from two collections: Centrafrique: Anthologie de la musique des Pygmées Aka, 1978, and Les Aborigènes: Chants et danses de l'Australie du nord, 1979, respectively.

- "Mo boma", "Nze-Nze-Nze" and "Kulu-Kulu" from Anthologie de la musique des Pygmées Aka
- "Galkan" from Chants et danses de l'Australie du nord

== Charts ==
Chart (1992)	Peak position
Canada Top Albums/CDs (RPM)	57
US Billboard 200	114

== Release history ==
Year	Label	Format	Catalog
1991	Warner Bros. Records	CD	2-26707
