= Sheeba Records =

Sheeba Records is a Canadian independent record label, owned and operated by Jane Siberry.

Siberry established Sheeba to release her albums following the end of her contract with Reprise Records in 1996. The first album she released on the label was Teenager, a collection of songs she had written in her teenage years but had never released on record.

Since Siberry established Sheeba, she has released all of her albums on the label.

== See also ==
- List of record labels
