= Rebecca Jenkins =

Canadian actress and singer

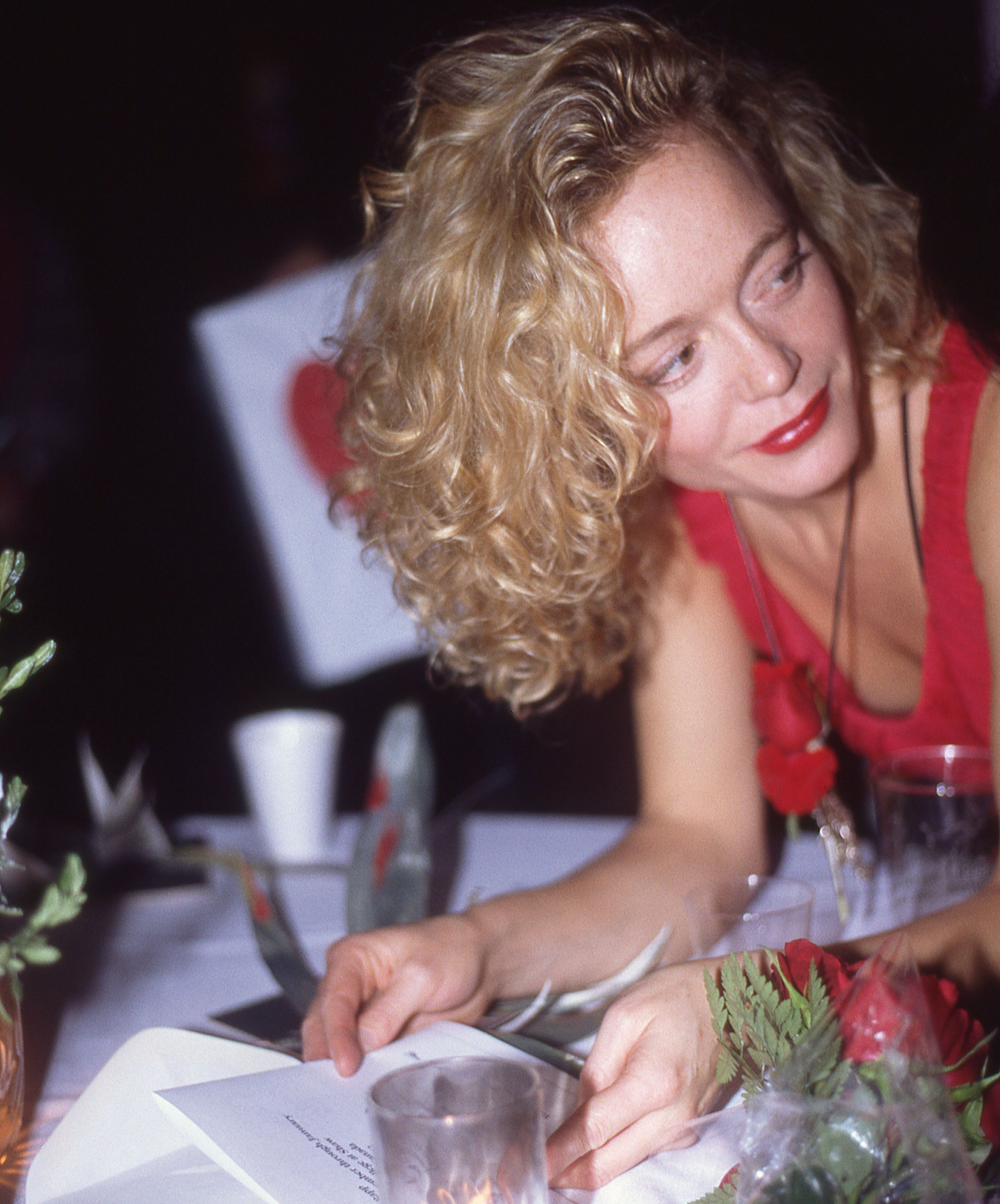
- Born: 1959 (age 66–67); Innisfail, Alberta, Canada
- Occupations: Actress, singer
- Years active: 1987–present
- Spouse: Joel Bakan (m. 2004)
- Children: 2

Rebecca Jenkins (born 1959) is a Canadian actress and singer.

== Acting ==
She had starring roles in the 1990s CBC series Black Harbour, and the films Bye Bye Blues, Marion Bridge, Wilby Wonderful, Whole New Thing, South of Wawa, and Supervolcano. She also had a supporting role in the 1992 film Bob Roberts, as Dolores Perrigrew. In NBC's miniseries 10.5 she portrayed California governor Carla Williams.

Jenkins appeared in the January 17, 2006, episode of the WB series Supernatural, where she played the loving wife to a faith healer. Her next project was a television movie entitled Past Sins directed by David Winning, in which she co-starred with Lauralee Bell. Past Sins aired on Lifetime in November 2006.

In 2012, she appeared in Sarah Polley's documentary film Stories We Tell, playing Polley's mother Diane in dramatic recreations.

== Personal life ==
She married Joel Bakan, the writer of the book and documentary film The Corporation, in July 2004.

== Music ==
As a singer, Jenkins has primarily been a backing vocalist for Jane Siberry and The Parachute Club. Early in her career, she provided the voicings of the mermaids in the 1987 film I've Heard the Mermaids Singing. She has also recorded tracks for a number of Canadian benefit and compilation albums, and participated in the Count Your Blessings concert with Siberry, Holly Cole, Mary Margaret O'Hara, and Victoria Williams. As well, Jenkins is featured prominently on the Bye Bye Blues soundtrack album; her character in the film is a woman who takes up jazz singing to support her family while her husband is away during World War II. She also performed the title track "Bye Bye Blues" in Calgary at the September 1, 2005, opening the night of the celebration of Alberta's centennial.

In 2005, her original song "Something's Coming" from the Wilby Wonderful soundtrack was nominated for a Genie Award.

In 2007, she was scheduled to release her first solo album, a collection of jazz standards. Her husband, Joel Bakan, a jazz guitarist, accompanied her as well as Al Matheson on trumpet and Liam Macdonald on drums and percussion.

She co-hosted a five-week radio series called Quiet, There's a Lady on Stage with singer-songwriter David Ramsden. The radio show was recorded with four new female singers weekly in the CBC's Glenn Gould Studio. Guests included Carole Pope, Holly Cole, Lee Whalen, Lori Yates, Molly Johnson, Kate Fenner, and Mary Margaret O'Hara.

== Filmography ==
=== Film ===
Year	Title	Role	Notes
1988	Cowboys Don't Cry	Lucy Morgan	
1989	Bye Bye Blues	Daisy Cooper	
1990	The Famine Within	Narrator	Documentary
1991	South of Wawa	Lizette	
1991	Clearcut	Louise	
1992	Bob Roberts	Delores Pettigrew	
2002	Interstate 60	Susan Ross	
2002	Past Perfect	Charlotte	
2002	Marion Bridge	Theresa	
2003	The Republic of Love	Maeve	
2004	Wilby Wonderful	Sandra Anderson	
2005	Whole New Thing	Kaya	
2009	Cole	Mrs. Chambers	
2010	Fathers & Sons	Rebecca	
2012	Stories We Tell	Diane Polley	Documentary
2014	Preggoland	Becky	
TBA	The Protector		

=== Television ===
Year	Title	Role	Notes
1988	Family Reunion	Caitlin	
1989	Street Legal	Sarah Melchuck	"Without Prejudice"
1990	Road to Avonlea	Sylvia Gray	"Old Lady Lloyd"
1991	Darrow	Ruby Darrow	TV film
1992	Till Death Us Do Part	Sandra Stockton	TV film
1992	Split Images	Angela Nolan	TV film
1993	X-Men	Heather Hudson (voice)	"Repo Man"
1993	Destiny Ridge	Linda Hazelton	TV film
1994	Harvest for the Heart	Madeline "Maddy" Hansen	TV film
1995	Nilus the Sandman: The First Day	Trenda (voice)	TV film
1996	The Legend of Ruby Silver	Kay Rainie	TV film
1996-99	Black Harbour	Katherine Hubbard	Main role
1997	Traders	Sister Connie	"Home Office"
1998	Stranger in Town	Katherine	TV film
2000	The Outer Limits	Dr. Louise Burrows	"The Beholder"
2000	Catch a Falling Star	Joyce McMurphy	TV film
2000	Angels in the Infield	Claire Everett	TV film
2000	Nuremberg	Irene Jackson	TV miniseries
2000	Love Lessons	Anne	TV film
2000	Foreign Objects	Judith	"Celebrity"
2001	And Never Let Her Go	Kathleen Fahey-Hosey	TV film
2001	Sex, Lies & Obsession	Annika	TV film
2002	Guilty Hearts	Nora Runkle	TV film
2002	The Associates	Melody Atwater	"Heart's Desire", "Definitely Maybe"
2002	A Nero Wolfe Mystery	Robina Keane	"The Next Witness"
2003	The Atwood Stories	Yvonne	"The Sunrise"
2003	The Twilight Zone	Mrs. Malone	"Homecoming"
2004	Kingdom Hospital	Rene Klingerman	"Goodbye Kiss"
2004	10.5	Gov. Carla Williams	TV miniseries
2004	The Five People You Meet in Heaven	Eddie's Mother	TV film
2005	Supervolcano	Wendy Reiss	TV film
2005	Into the West	Susannah Wheeler	"Dreams and Schemes"
2005-06	Godiva's	Godiva	Recurring role
2006	Supernatural	Sue Ann Le Grange	"Faith"
2006	Past Sins	Janice Bradford	TV film
2006	Reunion	Carla's Boss	"1998"
2008	The Guard	Joanne	"Coming Through Fog"
2010	Bond of Silence	Sandra	TV film
2018	Forgive Me	Nan	
