= John Switzer =

Canadian music producer

- Born: November 18, 1955 (age 69); Guelph, Ontario
- Occupation(s): Musician, Songwriter, Producer, Educator
- Instrument: Bass Guitar
- Spouse: Ingrid Veninger
- Website: https://johnswitzer.ca/

John Switzer (born November 18, 1955) is a Canadian music producer, bassist and educator. Switzer is best known for being a frequent collaborator and producing partner of singer/songwriter Jane Siberry, as well as his production work with other notable artists, such as Andrew Cash, Grievous Angels, Rita Chiarelli, and Waltons.

He also frequently works with his wife, filmmaker Ingrid Veninger.

== Early life ==
Switzer was born in Guelph, Ontario in 1955 to Dorothy and Clayton Switzer as the eldest of three siblings. His father was dean of agriculture at the University of Guelph, and John spent summers working on the university farms. It was at the University of Guelph where he met frequent collaborator Jane Siberry.

== Career ==
John Switzer and Jane Siberry met in Guelph in the 1980s and began performing together in the band Java Jive on the Ontario campus circuit.

After Siberry decided to pursue a solo career, she retained Switzer as her musical and personal partner. Their partnership was marked by a deep musical synergy, with Switzer's production skills complementing Siberry's unique artistic vision. This collaboration led to the production of several of Siberry's notable albums, including No Borders Here, The Speckless Sky, and The Walking.

In this era he also produced albums for Andrew Cash, Grievous Angels, and The Cajun Ramblers.

Switzer was music consultant and music director for filmmaker Patricia Rozema's I've Heard the Mermaids Singing (1987) and White Room (1990). He later produced the score for Zero Patience (1993) by filmmaker John Greyson.

Switzer worked as production sound recordist on a number of the films of Ingrid Veninger, including Modra (2010), Porcupine Lake (2017), The World or Nothing (El Mundo O Nada) (2019), and Crocodile Eyes (2024).

John Switzer teaches audio production at Seneca Polytechnic and is the program coordinator of the Independent Music Production (IMP) and Independent Songwriting & Performance programs at Seneca College in Toronto.

He also performs as a session bassist.

== Selected discography ==
=== Jane Siberry ===
- No Borders Here (1984)
- The Speckless Sky (1985)
- The Walking (1987)
- Bound by the Beauty (1989)

=== The Waltons ===
- Lik My Trakter (1992)

=== Rita Chiarelli ===
- Road Rockets (1991)
- Just Gettin' Started (1994)

=== Anne Lederman ===
- Fiddlesong (2002)

=== Leela Gilday ===
- Spirit World, Solid Wood (2002)

=== Nathan ===
- Jimson Weed (2004)

== Awards ==
- Producer of the Year at the 1986 Casby Awards for Jane Siberry's The Speckless Sky
- Best Recording Producer in the 1996 NOW magazine Reader's Poll
- Producer of the Year at the 1996 Porcupine Awards
- Best Producer/Engineer trophy at the 2000 Aboriginal Music Awards
