= Duke Street Records =

- Founded: 1984
- Founder: Andrew Hermant
- Status: Defunct
- Genre: Various
- Country of origin: Canada
- Location: Toronto, Ontario, Canada

Duke Street Records was a Canadian independent record label established in 1984 by Andrew Hermant, but the record label ceased operating in 1994. The Universal Music Group took over the label when it halted operations.

== Background ==
Duke Street Records was originally under the umbrella of the PAJA company of which Duke Street Records president Andrew Hemmant was the principal. The vice-president was Andrew Heaps. Jane Cameron had the role of being in charge of national radio and promotion. In November 1983 Bill Bobek joined the company to handle national publicity. In April 1984, Peter Vitols, an Australian record industry veteran joined the company. As of May 1985, the company had offices in Toronto's Adelaide Street. Mantra Sound Studios, also PAJA Company Ltd. subsidiary was also located there.

The label released albums in a wide variety of genres by artists such as Art Bergmann, The Front, Jane Siberry, FM, Rik Emmett, Willie P. Bennett, Rob McConnell, Scott Merritt, Chalk Circle, Valdy, Manteca, Don Ross, Eye Eye, Neo A4, and Barbara Lynch.

== History ==
Sheree Jeacocke released her first single, "Maybe You've Gotta Hurt" bw "Feel the Sun Go Down" on Duke Street Records DSR-S3/22-82 in 1982.

It was reported in the 29 June 1985 issue of RPM Weekly that the Bowkun Trio, comprising Ellen Meyer on piano, Sandra Bowkun on flute and Julia Bowkun on cello had released their album on Duke Street Records. It was also reported that Bernadete Shannon who had worked in publicity and promotion in London and New York had joined Duke Street Records as the national publicity director. She was filling a position that was vacated by Bill Bobek who had recently gone to MuchMusic. Shannon would be reporting the label's vice-president Adrian Heaps.

As reported in the 4 May 1985 issue of RPM Weekly, artists that were on the label's roster included violinist Hugh Marsh, singer/songwriter Brian Plummer, pianist Hagood Hardy, and singer Valdy. Duke Street Records also had the Master Series specialty label which was devoted to classical and other specialty music. One act on that division was Quintessence.

Brian Plummer recorded for the label. His group Brian Pummer and the Suspects released their self-titled album on Duke Street Records DSR-31012-P in 1985. It was the RPM Weekly album pick for the week of 20 July 1985. It also had a positive review elsewhere in the issue.

Doug Riley's album Freedom was released on Duke Street DSR 31066 in 1990.

== Later years ==
In 1995, Hermant donated his entire archive of Duke Street material to the Music Archives at the National Library of Canada. This 24-year collection includes over 2,100 audio tapes and a 30 cm stack of textual records, including promotional material and photographs.

== See also ==
- List of record labels
