= Ken Myhr =

Canadian musician and composer

Ken Myhr is a Canadian musician and composer. He is most noted for his work on the film The Accountant of Auschwitz, for which he won the Canadian Screen Award for Best Music in a Non-Fiction Program or Series at the 8th Canadian Screen Awards in 2020.

Myhr first became noted as a session musician, most notably as a guitarist for Jane Siberry and Cowboy Junkies. He had his first credit as a composer on the 1994 short film Arrowhead, and his first feature film credit on the 1996 film Not Me! (Sous-sol). His later credits have included the films Project Grizzly, The Herd, The Real Inglorious Bastards, The World Before Her, Driving with Selvi, Migrant Dreams and Parade: Queer Acts of Love and Resistance.

He was previously a Canadian Screen Award nominee at the 1st Canadian Screen Awards in 2013 for his work on The Market and at the 2nd Canadian Screen Awards for Herman's House and The Real Sherlock Holmes, and a four-time Gemini Award nominee for his work on Dead Heat, Geologic Journey: The Great Lakes, Geologic Journey II: The Pacific Rim and Love at the Twilight Motel.
