= Toronto Film Critics Association Award for Outstanding Performance in a Canadian Film =

- Awarded for: Outstanding performance by an actor or an actress in a Canadian film
- Country: Canada
- Presented by: Toronto Film Critics Association
- Currently held by: Glenn Howerton, BlackBerry (2023)
- Website: torontofilmcritics.com

The Toronto Film Critics Association Award for Outstanding Performance in a Canadian Film is one of the annual awards given by the Toronto Film Critics Association. It was presented for the first time in 2023.

The award was discontinued as of the Toronto Film Critics Association Awards 2025, with new awards introduced that year for Outstanding Lead Performance in a Canadian Film and Outstanding Supporting Performance in a Canadian Film.

== Winners and runners-up ==
=== 2020s ===
Year	Winner	Film	Role	Ref.
2023	Glenn Howerton	BlackBerry	Jim Balsillie	
2023	Jay Baruchel	BlackBerry	Mike Lazaridis	
2023	Théodore Pellerin	Solo	Simon	
2024	Félix-Antoine Duval	Shepherds (Bergers)	Mathyas	
2024	Deragh Campbell	Matt and Mara	Mara	
2024	Roy Dupuis	Rumours	Maxime Laplace	
