= Wu Mochou =

Momo Wu
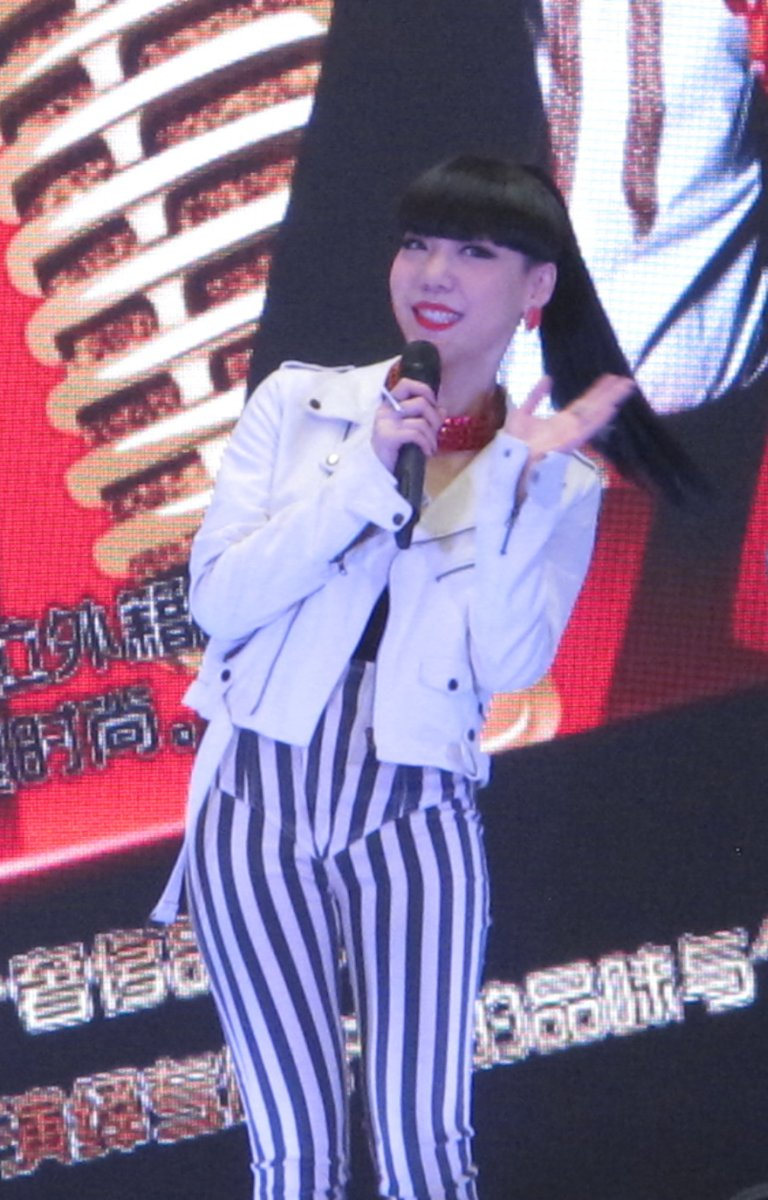
- Momo Wu performing in Chongqing, 2013.
- Born: 18 April 1992 (age 34); Qiqihar, Heilongjiang, China
- Occupations: Singer, rapper
- Years active: 2012–present

Chinese name
- Traditional Chinese: 吳莫愁
- Simplified Chinese: 吴莫愁
Transcriptions
Standard Mandarin
- Hanyu Pinyin: Wú Mòchóu
- Musical career
- Genres: C-pop; R&B

Wu Mochou (born 18 April 1992), also known as Momo Wu, is a Chinese singer. She rose to fame after finishing as the runner-up in The Voice of China (season 1).

== Biography ==
=== 1992–2012: Early life ===
Wu was born in Qiqihar, Heilongjiang, China, the daughter of a singer. During her childhood, Wu followed her parents in a caravan and performed all over the country. When she was 18, her father died. To remember him, Wu tattooed his portrait on her left arm.

In 2011, Wu was admitted to the Shenyang Conservatory of Music, and started to sing at a local pub outside of the school. While performing at the pub, she started singing R&B, rock, and a variety of other music genres, and mapped out her own style.

=== 2012– : career beginnings ===
In 2012, Wu took part in the Voice of China competition, one of the most popular television shows in China during that year. Her first song was "Price Tag" by Jessie J. She was chosen by Harlem Yu, one of the four judges in the contest, who later became her mentor.

Throughout the series, some audience members disliked her performances and said she had destroyed the songs. But Wu, whose voice bears a resemblance to Kimbra, Amy Winehouse, Duffy and Gin Wigmore, was proud of her own style. In the final rounds, Wu experimented an improvisation of "Itch"(癢) by Huang Ling, which she combined with "The Wandering Songstress"(天涯歌女) by Zhou Xuan, causing controversy.

Wu took second place in the competition; her sense of humor and positive attitude has since brought her a large group of fans.

On 21 November 2012, Wu released her first studio single "I Will Give You"(我要給你) featuring Harlem Yu.

On 25 December 2012, "Sunshine Legend"(陽光傳奇) featuring Li Daimo, was released. It was adopted as the new city song of Shenyang.

In 2013, Wu had cameos in the film Better and Better(《越來越好之村晚》), and sang in the episode "I Will Give You"(我要給你).

On 21 March, Wu released a new studio single "Love Love Love Love"(愛愛愛愛). It was also used as incidental music in the film The Chef, the Actor, the Scoundrel(《厨子戏子痞子》).

From December 2012 to February 2013, Wu attended a CCTV's talent contest miniseries Dreams Chorus(the Chinese version of Clash of the Choirs), leading Team Shanghai to sing for charity funds for Raleigh China: Expeditions. Although her team did not win the contest, it raised 37 million yuan in donations.

Wu rose to prominence with incomparable speed. She was awarded "Singer of the Year" in a selection activity hosted by New Weekly. At the 2012 China Charm Awards hosted by the Southern People Weekly, Wu won the Different Glamour Award of 2012.

At the Women's Media Awards 2012, jointly hosted by UN Women and NetEase, Wu won the 2012 Female Model Award.

In 2013, Wu was signed up by Pepsi as a sponsor and subsequently released a new single, "Live For Now Momo"(就现在). The music video of the song quickly broke the Chinese record as the most watched video with over 200 million views to date.

In 2015, Wu sang the song “舞底线” for movie “捉妖记”.

== Discography ==
- 2014: Jiu Xian Zai Wu Suo Bu Zai
- 2015: Jiējìn wúxiàn
- 2015: Next to the infinite
- 2017: Create
- 2018: More real

== Filmography ==
- Run for Love (2016)
