= Gian Paolo Peloso =

Italian violinist and conductor (born 1977)

- Born: December 18, 1977; Rome, Italy
- Genres: Classical
- Occupation: Violinist
- Label: Sony Classical
- Website: www.gianpaolopeloso.com

Gian Paolo Peloso (born 18 December 1977) is an Italian violinist and conductor. He plays a 1710 Matteo Goffriller violin. Previously he played on a Landolfi violin from 1755.

== Biography ==
Peloso was born in Rome, Italy, to a family of musicians. His mother is a violinist and his father, Paolo Peloso, is a conductor. During his years of training, he studied with Zinaida Gilels, Ruggiero Ricci, Victor Pikayzen, Valery Klimov, Igor Ozim, Viktor Tretykov and Pierre Amoyal, as well as Ivry Gitlis.

Peloso made his debut at the age of 10 under the direction of composer Luciano Berio. He has performed in Europe, Asia and the United States as a soloist with orchestras, in recitals, and in chamber music concerts.

During his career, he has been invited to participate in the Kuhmo Chamber Music Festival in Finland, the Martha Argerich Festival in Switzerland, and has made appearances at the Società dei Concerti Foundation of Milan, the Moscow International House of Music, the Singapore Sun Festival, the Archipel Festival in Geneva, the Hong Kong Musical Fest, the Cannes Festival in France, and the Weill Recital Hall in New York.

He has toured extensively with the Camerata de Lausanne and performed chamber music with Sofia Gubaidulina, Mark Lubotsky, Vladimir Mendelssohn, and Bruno Canino.

Peloso is Violin Professor at the Conservatory of Music of Neuchatel in Switzerland. He is a faculty member at the Hong Kong Academy for Performing Arts.

Gian Paolo Peloso has recorded sonatas by Saint-Saens and Poulenc for the National Swiss Radio with pianist Filippini.

Peloso has recorded for Sony Classical an album including violin sonatas by Respighi and Busoni, with pianist Bruno Canino, and has recorded the complete violin sonatas of Faure. He has recorded works by Chausson and Saint-Saëns with the London Symphony Orchestra.

As a conductor, he is a pupil of Jorma Panula. He has conducted the Kuopio Symphony Orchestra and the Sofia Philharmonic Orchestra.
