= The Voice of China season 1 =

The Voice of China
- Season 1
- Hosted by: Hu Qiaohua
- Judges: Yang Kun; Na Ying; Liu Huan; Harlem Yu
- Winner: Bruce Liang 梁博
- Winning coach: Na Ying
- Runner-up: Momo Wu 吴莫愁

Release
- Original network: ZRTG: Zhejiang Television
- Original release: 13 July – 30 September 2012

Season chronology
- Next → Season 2

The first season of The Voice of China (Chinese: 中国好声音; pinyin: Zhōngguó Hǎo Shēngyīn) is a Chinese reality talent show that premiered on 13 July 2012, on the Zhejiang Television sponsored by Jiaduobao.

== Teams ==
Colour key

- Winner
- Runner-up
- Third place
- Fourth place
- Eliminated in the Playoffs
- Eliminated in the Knockouts
- Eliminated in the Battles

Coaches	Top 56 artists						
Yang Kun							
Yang Kun	Kim Ji-mun 金志文	Guan Zhe 关喆	Ping An 平安	Ding Ding 丁丁	Ding Shaohua 丁少华	Wu Jiali 伍佳丽	Zou Hongyu 邹宏宇
Yang Kun	Cao Yin 曹寅	Huang Yi 黄一	Ni Ke 尼克	Ni Yafeng 倪雅丰	Wang Yang 汪洋	Zhang Weiqi 张玮琪	Zhou Lihu 周礼虎
Na Ying							
Na Ying	Bruce Liang 梁博	Zhang Wei 张玮	Duo Liang 多亮	Zhang Hexuan 张赫宣	Chang Yu-hsia 张玉霞	Hou Zuxin 侯祖辛	Wang Yuling 汪妤凌
Na Ying	Ge Yusen 歌浴森	Huang He 黄鹤	Huang Yong 黄勇	Li Min 李敏	Wang Qiwei 王琪玮	Zhao Lu 赵露	Zhuo Yifeng 卓义峰
Liu Huan							
Liu Huan	Jike Junyi 吉克隽逸	Quan Zhendong 权振东	Tia Ray 袁娅维	Xu Haixing 徐海星	Li Daimo 李代沫	Liu Yue 刘悦	Wang Naien 王乃恩
Liu Huan	Chen Bin 陈斌	Jia Ning Group 佳宁组合	Li Hangliang 李行亮	Li Haohan 李昊瀚	Liu Haolin 刘昊霖	Liu Zhenyu 刘振宇	Zheng Hong 郑虹
Harlem Yu							
Harlem Yu	Momo Wu 吴莫愁	Wang Yunyi 王韵壹	Ada Jin 金池	Da Shan 大山	Chu Qiao 褚乔	Li Weizhen 李维真	Wang Ke 王克
Harlem Yu	Amis Girls 阿蜜丝女孩	Chen Juntong 陈俊彤	Ge Lin 葛林	Tao Hongxu 陶虹旭	Wei Yunuo 魏语诺	Xie Dan 谢丹	Zhao Ke 赵可
Note: Italicized names are artists directly advanced to the playoffs via coach's choice. Bold names are artists receive "Fast Pass" and directly advanced to the final round of the playoffs via coach's choice.

== Blind auditions ==
Colour key

✔	Coach hit his or her "I WANT YOU" button
	Artist defaulted to this coach's team
	Artist elected to join this coach's team
	Artist eliminated with no coach pressing his or her "I WANT YOU" button

=== Episode 1 (13 July) ===
Order	Contestant	Song	Coach's and contestant's choices			
Order	Contestant	Song	Yang Kun	Na Ying	Liu Huan	Harlem Yu
1	Huang He (黄鹤) _{20, from Zhangwu, Liaoning}	"Rolling in the Deep" _{originally by Adele}			—	
2	Huang Yong (黄勇) _{32, from Xuancheng, Anhui}	"春天里" _{(Spring; Chūntiān Li), originally by Wang Feng}				
3	Deng Chuan (邓川) _{25, from Tianjin}	"想你的夜" _{(Night Thinking of You; Xiǎng Nǐ De Yè), originally by Guan Zhe}	—	—	—	—
4	Zhang Wei (张玮) _{22, from Chifeng, Inner Mongolia}	"High歌" _{(High song; High Gē), originally by Huang Ling}				
5	Xu Haixing (徐海星) _{23, from Chengdu, Sichuan}	"自己" _{(Self; Zìjǐ), originally by Coco Lee}		—		
6	Li Daimo (李代沫) _{24, from Qiqihar, Heilongjiang}	"我的歌声里" _{(You Exist In My Song; Wǒ De Gēshēng Li), originally by Qu Wanting}	—	—		
7	Li Weizhen (李维真) _{22, from Jinping, Honghe, Yunnan}	"在那遥远的地方" _{(In that place wholly faraway; Zài Nà Yáoyuǎn Dì Dìfāng), originally by Wang Luobin}		—	—	
8	Zou Hongyu (邹宏宇) _{26, from Shuangta, Chaoyang, Liaoning}	"What a Wonderful World" _{originally by Louis Armstrong}		—		
9	Zhao Lu (赵露) _{20, from Yueyang, Hunan}	"我是一只小小鸟" _{(I was a Little Little Bird; Wǒ Shì Yī Zhī Xiǎoxiǎo Niǎo), originally by Chief Chao}	—			
10	Chang Yu-hsia (张玉霞) _{36, from Banqiao, New Taipei, Taiwan}	"独上西楼" _{(Alone Ascending The West Chamber; Dú Shàng Xi Lóu), originally by Teresa Teng}				

=== Episode 2 (20 July) ===
Order	Contestant	Song	Coach's and contestant's choices			
Order	Contestant	Song	Yang Kun	Na Ying	Liu Huan	Harlem Yu
1	Ding Ding (丁丁) _{24, from Jinan, Shandong}	"爱要坦荡荡" _{(Ài Yào Tǎndàngdàng), originally by Ruby Siu}				
2	Wang Yunyi (王韵壹) _{26, from Taiyuan, Shanxi}	"被遗忘的时光" _{(The Forgotten Time; Bèi Yíwàng De Shíguāng), originally by Tsai Chin}				
3	Ge Lin (葛林) _{32, from Harbin, Heilongjiang}	"我是不是你最疼爱的人" _{(Am I Whom You Love the Most; Wǒ Shì Bùshì Nǐ Zuì Téng'ài De Rén), originally by Michelle Pan}	—	—	—	
4	Liu Yue (刘悦) _{30, from Huai'an, Jiangsu}	"寂寞先生" _{(Mister Lonely; Jìmò Xiānshēng), originally by Gary Chaw}				
5	Dong Zhen (董贞) _{26, from Sanming, Fujian}	"刀剑如梦" _{(Sword and Knife Just like a Dream; Dāojiàn Rú Mèng), originally by Wakin Chau}	—	—	—	—
6	Duo Liang (多亮) _{27, from Karamay, Xinjiang}	"小情歌" _{(Little Love Song; Xiǎo Qínggē), originally by Sodagreen}				
7	Qi Wen (齐雯) _{31, from Tianjin}	"不管有多苦" _{(No matter how bad; Bùguǎn Yǒu Duō Kǔ), originally by Natasha Na}	—	—	—	—
8	Wang Naien (王乃恩) _{26, from Shanghai}	"Listen" _{originally by Beyoncé Knowles}				
9	Dai Yue (戴月) _{38, from Wuhan, Hubei}	"其实你不懂我的心" _{(In Fact, You Don't Understand My Heart; Qíshí Nǐ Bù Dǒng Wǒ De Xīn), originally by Angus Tung}	—	—	—	—
10	Ping An (平安) _{34, from Shanghai}	"我爱你中国" _{(I Love You, China; Wǒ Ài Nǐ Zhōngguó), originally by Ye Peiying}		—	—	—

=== Episode 3 (27 July) ===
Order	Contestant	Song	Coach's and contestant's choices			
Order	Contestant	Song	Yang Kun	Na Ying	Liu Huan	Harlem Yu
1	Wu Jiali (伍佳丽) _{26, from Guizhou}	"一想到你呀" _{(As Soon As I Think of You; Yī Xiǎngdào Nǐ Ya), originally by A-mei}		—	—	—
2	Momo Wu (吴莫愁) _{20, from Qiqihar, Heilongjiang}	"Price Tag" _{originally by Jessie J}	—		—	
3	Zhang Weiqi (张玮琪) _{30岁, from Anhui}	"特别的爱给特别的你" _{(Special Love for Special You; Tèbié De Ài Gěi Tèbié De Nǐ), originally by Sky Wu}		—	—	
4	Tia Ray (袁娅维) _{28, from Hunan}	"弯弯的月亮" _{(The Crescent Moon; Wānwān De Yuèliàng), originally by Liu Huan}				
5	Chu Qiao (褚乔) _{22, from Tangshan, Hebei}	"回到拉萨" _{(Back to Lhasa; Huí Dào Lāsà), originally by Zheng Jun}		—	—	
6	Ni Yafeng (倪雅丰) _{22, from Qingdao, Shandong}	"我和你 (You and Me)" _{(You and Me; Wǒ Hé Nǐ), originally by Liu Huan and Sarah Brightman}		—	—	—
7	Ding Shaohua(丁少华) _{25, from Pingliang, Gansu}	"我要我们在一起" _{(We Belong Together; Wǒ Yào Wǒmen Zài Yīqǐ), originally by Mavis Fan}				—
8	Jia Ning Group: Sun Jiahuan (孙佳欢) _{29, from Harbin, Heilongjiang}; Tang Ning (唐宁) _{29, from Qingdao, Shandong}	"The Prayer" _{originally by Celine Dion and Andrea Bocelli}				
9	Yingzi (英子) _{30, from Guiyang, Guizhou}	"梦醒时分" _{(Dream of Awakening; Mèng Xǐng Shífēn), originally by Sarah Chen}	—	—	—	—
10	Wang Yang (汪洋) _{20, from Chengdu, Sichuan}	"天天想你" _{(Miss You Everyday; Tiāntiān Xiǎng Nǐ), originally by Chang Yu-sheng}		—	—	—

1. - Yang Kun pressed Na Ying's button.

=== Episode 4 (3 August) ===
Order	Contestant	Song	Coach's and contestant's choices			
Order	Contestant	Song	Yang Kun	Na Ying	Liu Huan	Harlem Yu
1	Chen Juntong (陈俊彤) _{23, from Panjin, Liaoning}	"爱什么稀罕" _{(What is Rare Love; Ài Shénme Xīhan), originally by A-mei}	—	—		
2	Xie Dan (谢丹) _{25, from Jilin}	"贼拉拉的爱你" _{(Deceitful Lala Love You; Zéi Lālā De Ài Nǐ)}	—	—	—	
3	Shanye (李昊瀚[山野]) _{28, from Beijing}	"如果没有你" _{(Without You; Rúguǒ Méiyǒu Nǐ), originally by Karen Mok}	—	—	—	—
4	Quan Zhendong (权振东) _{25, from Changchun, Jilin}	"飞机场的十点半" _{(10:30 Airport; Fēijī Chǎng De Shí Diǎn Bàn), originally by David Tao}	—	—		
5	Liu Zhenyu (刘振宇) _{25, from Jilin}	"爱什么稀罕" _{(What is Rare Love; Ài Shénme Xīhan), originally by A-mei}	—	—		
6	Kim Ji-mun (金志文) _{30, from Jilin}	"为爱疯狂" _{(Crazy for Love; Wèi Ài Fēngkuáng), originally by Rene Liu}			—	
7	Zhuo Yifeng (卓义峰) _{27, from Tainan}	"我期待" _{(I Wish; Wǒ Qídài), originally by Chang Yu-sheng}	—		—	—
8	Zheng Hong (郑虹) _{19, from Fuzhou, Fujian}	"Someone Like You" _{originally by Adele}				
9	Zhang Hexuan (张赫宣) _{27, from Liaozhong, Shenyang, Liaoning}	"你是我心爱的姑娘" _{(You Are My Favorite Girl; Nǐ Shì Wǒ Xīn'ài De Gūniang), originally by Wang Feng}	—	—	—	—
10	Amis Girls 阿蜜丝女孩: Awu (阿巫) _{24, from Hualien, Taiwan}; Ashi (阿诗) _{25, from Hualien, Taiwan}	"美" _{(Beauty; Měi), originally by Leehom Wang}			—	
11	Ada Jin (金池) _{34, from Fujian}	"夜夜夜夜" _{(Night and Night; Yèyè-Yèyè), originally by Chyi Chin}				
12	Shen Manyu (沈漫雨) _{19, from Hangzhou, Zhejiang}	"大眼睛" _{(Big Eyes; Dà Yǎnjīng), originally by Harlem Yu}	—	—	—	—
13	Bruce Liang (梁博) _{21, from Changchun, Jilin}	"长安长安" _{(Chang'an Chang'an; Cháng'ān Cháng'ān), originally by Zheng Jun}	—		—	—
14	Liu Li (刘力) _{23, from Yiyang, Hunan}	"我的心里只有你没有他" _{(You Are the Only One in My Heart; Wǒ De Xīnlǐ Zhǐyǒu Nǐ Méiyǒu Tā), originally by Tiger Huang}	—	—	—	—
15	Guan Zhe (关喆) _{31, from Beijing}	"领悟" _{(Understand; Lǐngwù), originally by Winnie Hsin}				

=== Episode 5 (10 August) ===
Order	Contestant	Song	Coach's and contestant's choices			
Order	Contestant	Song	Yang Kun	Na Ying	Liu Huan	Harlem Yu
1	Chen Bin (陈斌) _{23, from Shanghai}	"燃烧" _{(Ránshāo; Burning), originally by Sun Nan}	—	—		—
2	Li Min (李敏) _{22, from Gongshan, Xinyang, Henan}	"爱的箴言" _{(Ài De Zhēnyán; Proverbs of Love), originally by Chyi Chin}	—		—	—
3	Wang Ke (王克) _{21, from Chengdu, Sichuan}	"开到荼蘼" _{(The Last Blossom; Kāi Dào Tú Mí), originally by Faye Wong}	—	—	—	
4	Jin Xiuyuan (金秀媛) _{34, from Tianjin}	"昨日星辰" _{(Stars of yesterday; Zuórì Xīngchén), originally by Anna Lin}	—	—	—	—
5	Liu Haolin (刘昊霖) _{23, from Qingdao, Shandong}	"干杯朋友+Rap" _{(Cheers, Friend; Gānbēi Péngyǒu), originally by Tian Zhen}	—	—		—
6	Wang Yuling (汪妤凌) _{26, from Beijing}	"执迷不悔" _{(Persisting with No Regrets; Zhímí Bù Huǐ), originally by Faye Wong}	—		—	
7	Huang Zilong (黄子龙) _{29, from Wuhan, Hunan}	"吻别" _{(Kiss Goodbye; Wěnbié), originally by Jacky Cheung}	—	—	—	—
8	Ge Yusen (歌浴森) _{25, from Xuchang, Henan}	"征服" _{(Conquered; Zhēngfú), originally by Na Ying}	—		—	
9	Jike Junyi (吉克隽逸) _{24, from Ganluo, Sichuan}	"I Feel Good" _{originally by James Brown}				
10	Zhou Lihu (周礼虎) _{26, from Guhe, Quanjiao, Anhui}	"爱" _{(Love; Ài), originally by Xiao Hu Dui}		—	—	—
11	Wang Chong (王崇) _{26, from Harbin, Heilongjiang}	"白天不懂夜的黑" _{(Day Doesn't Understand Night's Darkness; Báitiān Bù Dǒng Yè De Hēi), originally by Natasha Na}	—	—	—	—
12	You, I, and It: Wang Yu (王宇) _{22, from Anhui}; Wu Yanrui (吴延睿) _{22, from Anhui}	"过火" _{(Gone Too Far; Guòhuǒ), originally by Jeff Chang}	—	—	—	—
13	Wei Yunuo (魏语诺) _{27, from Qingdao, Shandong}	"花房姑娘" _{(Maiden of the Flower Chamber; Huāfáng Gūniang), originally by Cui Jian}			—	
14	Yun Jie (云杰) _{31, from Hohhot, Inner Mongolia}	"天堂" _{(Heaven; Tiāntáng), originally by Tengger}	—	—	—	—
15	Cheng Yu (成彧) _{20, from Loudi, Hunan}	"眼色" _{(Eye Color; Yǎnsè), originally by Yoga Lin}	—	—	—	—
16	Li Hangliang (李行亮) _{29, from Xiangyang, Hubei}	"涛声依旧" _{(Still the Same; Tāo Shēng Yījiù), originally by Mao Ning}	—	—		
17	Da Shan (大山) _{26, from Xinjiang}	"千年之恋" _{(Love of a Thousand Years; Qiānnián Zhī Liàn), originally by Tai Ailing ft. Shin}	—	—	—	—
18	Huang Yi (黄一) _{18, from Shanghai}	"城里的月光" _{(Moonlight in the City; Chéng Lǐ De Yuèguāng), originally by Mavis Hee}		—	—	—

=== Episode 6 (17 August) ===
Order	Contestant	Song	Coach's and contestant's choices			
Order	Contestant	Song	Yang Kun	Na Ying	Liu Huan	Harlem Yu
1	Hou Zuxin (侯祖辛) _{26, from Beijing}	"Love Me Tender" _{originally by Elvis Presley}	—		—	—
2	Tao Hongxu (陶虹旭) _{24, from Beijing}	"听海" _{(Listen to the Sea; Tīng Hǎi), originally by A-mei}	—	—	—	
3	Ni Ke (尼克) _{34, from Shenzhen}	"My heart will go on" _{originally by Celine Dion}		—	—	—
4	Wang Qiwei (王琪玮) _{20, from Tongren, Guizhou}	"小情歌" _{(Little Love Song; Xiǎo Qínggē), originally by Sodagreen}	—		—	
5	Zhao Ke (赵可) _{35, from Shaoyang, Hunan}	"我要你的爱" _{(I Want Your Love; Wǒ Yào Nǐ De Ài), originally by Grace Chang}	—	—		
6	Cao Yin (曹寅) _{26, from Jinan, Shandong}	"会呼吸的痛" _{(Breathing Pain; Huì Hūxī De Tòng), originally by Fish Leong}				—
7	Wang Yan (王燕) _{41, from Harbin, Heilongjiang}	"别在伤口撒盐" _{(Don't Salt the Wound; Bié Zài Shāngkǒu Sǎ Yán), originally by A-mei}		—	—	—
Revival round
8	Cheng Yu (成彧) _{20, from Loudi, Hunan}	"燃烧" _{(Burning; Ránshāo), originally by Sun Nan}		—	—	—
9	Da Shan (大山) _{26, from Xinjiang}	"千年之恋" _{(Love of a Thousand Years; Qiānnián Zhī Liàn), originally by Tai Ailing ft. Shin}			—	
10	Shanye (李昊瀚[山野]) _{28, from Beijing}	"如果没有你" _{(Without You; Rúguǒ Méyǒu Nǐ), originally by Karen Mok}		—		
11	Yun Jie (云杰) _{31, from Hohhot, Inner Mongolia}	"鸿雁" _{(Swan Goose; Hóngyàn), originally by Erguna Band}		—		
12	Dai Yue (戴月) _{39, from Wuhan, Hubei}	"我的心里只有你没有他" _{(You Are the Only One in My Heart; Wǒ De Xīnlǐ Zhǐyǒu Nǐ Méiyǒu Tā), originally by Tiger Huang}		—		
13	Zhang Hexuan (张赫宣) _{27, from Liaozhong, Shenyang, Liaoning}	"你把我灌醉" _{(You Make Me Drunk; Nǐ Bǎ Wǒ Guànzuì), originally by Wong Dai-wai}				

Coach has reached the limit of team members and cannot choose any more.

== The Battles ==
Coaches begin narrowing down the playing field by training the artists with the help of "Dream Coaches" ("Trusted Advisors" in English-speaking countries). They are San Bao for Team Liu Huan, Wang Chi-ping for Team Harlem, Wang Feng for Team Na Ying, and Coco Lee for Team Yang Kun. Each episode features battles consisting of pairings from within each team, and each battle concludes with the respective coach eliminating one of the two artists. After the Battles, one artist is chosen by each coach to automatically advance to the Playoffs.

Colour key

Artist won the Battles and advanced to the Knockouts
Artist won the Battles and receive "Fast Pass" and directly advanced to the Playoffs via coach's choice
Artist lost the Battles and was eliminated

Episode	Coach	Order	Winner	Song	Loser
Episode 7 (24 August)	Liu Huan	1	Wang Naien 王乃恩	"爱我还是他"	Li Haohan 李昊瀚
Episode 7 (24 August)	Liu Huan	2	Quan Zhendong 权振东	"冬天来了"	Jia Ning Group 佳宁组合
Episode 7 (24 August)	Liu Huan	3	Li Daimo 李代沫	"如果没有你"	Zheng Hong 郑虹
Episode 7 (24 August)	Liu Huan	4	Liu Yue 刘悦	"暗香"	Liu Zhenyu 刘振宇
Episode 7 (24 August)	Liu Huan	5	Jike Junyi 吉克隽逸	"Sexy Music"	Liu Haolin 刘昊霖
Episode 7 (24 August)	Liu Huan	6	Xu Haixing 徐海星	"美女与野兽"	Chen Bin 陈斌
Episode 7 (24 August)	Liu Huan	7	Tia Ray 袁娅维	"渔光曲"	Li Hangliang 李行亮
Episode 8 (31 August)	Harlem Yu	1	Da Shan 大山	"站在高岗上"	Chen Juntong 陈俊彤
Episode 8 (31 August)	Harlem Yu	2	Wang Ke 王克	"Susan 说"	Amis Girls 阿蜜丝女孩
Episode 8 (31 August)	Harlem Yu	3	Ada Jin 金池	"对你爱不完"	Wei Yunuo 魏语诺
Episode 8 (31 August)	Harlem Yu	4	Li Weizhen 李维真	"爱是你我"	Xie Dan 谢丹
Episode 8 (31 August)	Harlem Yu	5	Wang Yunyi 王韵壹	"一样的月光"	Zhao Ke 赵可
Episode 8 (31 August)	Harlem Yu	6	Momo Wu 吴莫愁	"Bad Romance"	Tao Hongxu 陶虹旭
Episode 8 (31 August)	Harlem Yu	7	Chu Qiao 褚乔	"我愿意"	Ge Lin 葛林
Episode 9 (7 September)	Na Ying	1	Wang Yuling 汪妤凌	"开门见山"	Zhao Lu 赵露
Episode 9 (7 September)	Na Ying	2	Zhang Hexuan 张赫宣	"无言"	Zhuo Yifeng 卓义峰
Episode 9 (7 September)	Na Ying	3	Zhang Wei 张玮	"三天三夜"	Ge Yusen 歌浴森
Episode 9 (7 September)	Na Ying	4	Chang Yu-hsia 张玉霞	"传奇"	Li Min 李敏
Episode 9 (7 September)	Na Ying	5	Duo Liang 多亮	"等你爱我"	Wang Qiwei 王琪玮
Episode 9 (7 September)	Na Ying	6	Bruce Liang 梁博	"北京北京"	Huang Yong 黄勇
Episode 9 (7 September)	Na Ying	7	Hou Zuxin 侯祖辛	"Domino"	Huang He 黄鹤
Episode 10 (14 September)	Yang Kun	1	Ding Ding 丁丁	"Baby"	Huang Yi 黄一
Episode 10 (14 September)	Yang Kun	2	Guan Zhe 关喆	"Don’t Break My Heart"	Zhang Weiqi 张玮琪
Episode 10 (14 September)	Yang Kun	3	Kim Ji-mun 金志文	"走四方"	Cao Yin 曹寅
Episode 10 (14 September)	Yang Kun	4	Ding Shaohua 丁少华	"Moves Like Jagger"	Zhou Lihu 周礼虎
Episode 10 (14 September)	Yang Kun	5	Wu Jiali 伍佳丽	"超快感"	Wang Yang 汪洋
Episode 10 (14 September)	Yang Kun	6	Ping An 平安	"不要告别" / "Time to Say Goodbye"	Ni Yafeng 倪雅丰
Episode 10 (14 September)	Yang Kun	7	Zou Hongyu 邹宏宇	"Goodbye My Love"	Ni Ke 尼克

== The Knockouts ==
The Knockouts, which were taped together with the Battles, were featured on the second half of the episodes aired on 24, 31 August and 7, 14 September 2012. The winning artists are paired through the drawing of lots and must sing once more to earn one of the remaining three team spots.

Colour key

Artist won the Knockouts and advances to the Playoffs
Artist lost the Knockouts and was eliminated

Episode	Coach	Order	Song	Artists		Song
Episode 7 (August 24)	Liu Huan	1	"人质"	Quan Zhendong 权振东	Wang Naien 王乃恩	"慢慢"
Episode 7 (August 24)	Liu Huan	2	"星星"	Xu Haixing 徐海星	Li Daimo 李代沫	"我怀念的"
Episode 7 (August 24)	Liu Huan	3	"At Last"	Tia Ray 袁娅维	Liu Yue 刘悦	"Feeling Good"
Episode 8 (August 31)	Harlem Yu	1	"不了情"	Wang Yunyi 王韵壹	Wang Ke 王克	"眼色"
Episode 8 (August 31)	Harlem Yu	2	"美丽笨女人"	Momo Wu 吴莫愁	Chu Qiao 褚乔	"Come Together"
Episode 8 (August 31)	Harlem Yu	3	"也许明天"	Da Shan 大山	Li Weizhen 李维真	"海阔天空"
Episode 9 (September 7)	Na Ying	1	"Black or White"	Zhang Wei 张玮	Wang Yuling 汪妤凌	"我是不是你最疼爱的人"
Episode 9 (September 7)	Na Ying	2	"花火"	Bruce Liang 梁博	Hou Zuxin 侯祖辛	"Angel"
Episode 9 (September 7)	Na Ying	3	"让每个人都心碎"	Duo Liang 多亮	Chang Yu-hsia 张玉霞	"你是我的眼"
Episode 10 (September 14)	Yang Kun	1	"洋葱"	Ping An 平安	Wu Jiali 伍佳丽	"衝動"
Episode 10 (September 14)	Yang Kun	2	"没那么简单"	Kim Ji-mun 金志文	Ding Shaohua 丁少华	"迷宫"
Episode 10 (September 14)	Yang Kun	3	"辛德瑞拉"	Ding Ding 丁丁	Zou Hongyu 邹宏宇	"我的心里只有你没有他"

== The Playoffs ==
There are three rounds in The Playoffs. In the first round, the four contestants have their own performances, and the coach decides on the contestant to advance to the final round. The 99-person media will eliminate one artist based on their votes, and they can choose to either vote or not vote for an artist. In the second round, the two remaining artists compete against each other, and the votes are decided by the media as well as the coach, who gives a total of 100 points for both artists. The artist with the highest number of votes advances to the next round. In the final round, the two remaining artists compete against each other, and the voting system is the same with the second round. The artist with the highest number of votes is the team champion and will advance to the finals.

Colour key

Artist advanced to the next round
Artist receive "Fast Pass" and directly advanced to the final round via coach's choice
Artist was eliminated

Round 1

Episode	Coach	Order	Artist	Song	Media votes	Result	Switched with
Episode 11 (21 September)	Liu Huan	1	Xu Haixing 徐海星	"Treat Her Like a Lady"	28	Eliminated	—N/a
Episode 11 (21 September)	Liu Huan	2	Tia Ray 袁娅维	"滚滚红尘"	83	Media's vote	Xu Haixing 徐海星
Episode 11 (21 September)	Liu Huan	3	Quan Zhendong 权振东	"亲爱的小孩"	—N/a	Huan's choice	Tia Ray 袁娅维
Episode 11 (21 September)	Liu Huan	4	Jike Junyi 吉克隽逸	“Halo”	97	Media's vote	—
Episode 11 (21 September)	Harlem Yu	1	Da Shan 大山	"王妃"	60	Eliminated	—N/a
Episode 11 (21 September)	Harlem Yu	2	Wang Yunyi 王韵壹	"你快乐所以我快乐"	88	Media's vote	Da Shan 大山
Episode 11 (21 September)	Harlem Yu	3	Ada Jin 金池	"后知后觉"	94	Media's vote	Wang Yunyi 王韵壹
Episode 11 (21 September)	Harlem Yu	4	Momo Wu 吴莫愁	"痒" / "天涯歌女"	—N/a	Harlem's choice	Ada Jin 金池
Episode 12 (28 September)	Na Ying						
Episode 12 (28 September)	Na Ying	1	Zhang Hexuan 张赫宣	"假行僧"	44	Eliminated	—N/a
Episode 12 (28 September)	Na Ying	2	Duo Liang 多亮	"你的背包"	76	Media's vote	—
Episode 12 (28 September)	Na Ying	3	Zhang Wei 张玮	"忐忑" / "Bad"	70	Media's vote	—
Episode 12 (28 September)	Na Ying	4	Bruce Liang 梁博	"私奔"	—N/a	Ying's choice	Zhang Hexuan 张赫宣
Episode 13 (29 September)	Yang Kun						
Episode 13 (29 September)	Yang Kun	1	Kim Ji-mun 金志文	"山沟沟"	93	Media's vote	—N/a
Episode 13 (29 September)	Yang Kun	2	Ding Ding 丁丁	"鏗鏘玫瑰"	33	Eliminated	—
Episode 13 (29 September)	Yang Kun	3	Guan Zhe 关喆	"你把我灌醉"	—N/a	Kun's choice	Kim Ji-mun 金志文
Episode 13 (29 September)	Yang Kun	4	Ping An 平安	"We Are the Champions"	99	Media's vote	—

Round 2

Episode	Coach	Order	Artist	Song	Coach points	Media points	Total points	Result
Episode 11 (21 September)	Liu Huan							
Episode 11 (21 September)	Liu Huan	1	Tia Ray 袁娅维	"Crazy"	45	26	71	Eliminated
Episode 11 (21 September)	Liu Huan	2	Jike Junyi 吉克隽逸	"带我去山顶"	55	73	128	Advanced
Episode 12 (28 September)	Harlem Yu							
Episode 12 (28 September)	Harlem Yu	1	Wang Yunyi 王韵壹	"爱情"	49	51	100	Advanced
Episode 12 (28 September)	Harlem Yu	2	Ada Jin 金池	"心在跳"	51	48	99	Eliminated
Episode 12 (28 September)	Na Ying							
Episode 12 (28 September)	Na Ying	1	Duo Liang 多亮	"I Believe"	52	35	87	Eliminated
Episode 12 (28 September)	Na Ying	2	Zhang Wei 张玮	"A Change Is Gonna Come"	48	64	112	Advanced
Episode 13 (29 September)	Yang Kun							
Episode 13 (29 September)	Yang Kun	1	Kim Ji-mun 金志文	"空城"	60	48	108	Advanced
Episode 13 (29 September)	Yang Kun	2	Ping An 平安	"欢颜"	40	51	91	Eliminated

Round 3

Episode	Coach	Order	Artist	Song	Coach points	Media points	Total points	Result
Episode 11 (21 September)	Liu Huan							
Episode 11 (21 September)	Liu Huan	1	Quan Zhendong 权振东	"拯救"	46	26	72	Eliminated
Episode 11 (21 September)	Liu Huan	2	Jike Junyi 吉克隽逸	“If I Ain't Got You”	54	73	127	Advanced
Episode 12 (28 September)	Harlem Yu							
Episode 12 (28 September)	Harlem Yu	1	Wang Yunyi 王韵壹	"情人的眼泪"	42	39	81	Eliminated
Episode 12 (28 September)	Harlem Yu	2	Momo Wu 吴莫愁	"爱是怀疑"	58	60	118	Advanced
Episode 12 (28 September)	Na Ying							
Episode 12 (28 September)	Na Ying	1	Bruce Liang 梁博	"像个孩子"	60	73	133	Advanced
Episode 12 (28 September)	Na Ying	2	Zhang Wei 张玮	"My Way"	40	26	66	Eliminated
Episode 13 (29 September)	Yang Kun							
Episode 13 (29 September)	Yang Kun	1	Guan Zhe 关喆	"想你的夜"	50	20	70	Eliminated
Episode 13 (29 September)	Yang Kun	2	Kim Ji-mun 金志文	"最浪漫的事"	50	79	129	Advanced

Non-competition performances
Order	Performers	Song
11.1	Liu Huan & his team (Xu Haixing, Tia Ray 袁娅维, Quan Zhendong 权振东, Jike Junyi 吉克隽逸)	"Against All Odds"
11.2	Harlem Yu & his team (Da Shan 大山, Wang Yunyi 王韵壹, Ada Jin 金池, Momo Wu 吴莫愁)	"热情的沙漠"
12.1	Na Ying & her team (Bruce Liang 梁博, Zhang Wei 张玮, Duo Liang 多亮, Zhang Hexuan 张赫宣)	"征服"
13.1	Yang Kun & his team (Ding Ding 丁丁, Ping An 平安, Kim Ji-mun 金志文, Guan Zhe 关喆)	"牧马人" / "力量"

== Final Concert - Winner Announced (Episode 14) ==
The season finale aired on Sunday, September 30, 2012 which took place at Shanghai Stadium in Shanghai, China. Bruce Liang 梁博 was named the winner.

Coach	Artist	Order	First song (with coach)	Order	Second song	Order	Third song	Order	Fourth song	Media points	Public points	Result
Harlem Yu	Momo Wu 吴莫愁	1	"让我一次爱个够"	5	"改变自己"	9	"流星雨"	11	"一个人生活"	36	43%	Runner-up
Na Ying	Bruce Liang 梁博	2	"爱要有你才完美"	6	"回来"	N/A (given bye)		12	"我爱你中国"	63	57%	Winner
Yang Kun	Kim Ji-mun 金志文	3	"兄弟"	7	"我想大声告诉你"	N/A (already eliminated)						Fourth place
Liu Huan	Jike Junyi 吉克隽逸	4	"天地在我心"	8	"情深谊长"	10	"不要怕"	N/A (already eliminated)				Third place

Non-competition performances
Order	Performers	Song
14.1	Anson Hu & Zheng Hong	"Someone like You"
14.2	David Wong & Zhang Hexuan 张赫宣	"你把我灌醉"
14.3	Gary Chaw & Liu Yue	"寂寞先生"
14.4	Jane Zhang & Quan Zhendong 权振东	"亲爱的小孩"
14.5	Huang Ying & Ping An 平安	"I Love You, China"
14.6	Wang Feng	"光明"
14.7	Panda Hsiung & Jin Xiuyuan	"夜夜夜夜"
14.8	Adam Lambert	"Trespassing"
14.9	Adam Lambert & Zhang Wei 张玮	"Whataya Want From Me"
14.10	A-mei	"我最亲爱的"

On finale night, Adam performed a duet with "Voice" contestant Zhang Wei 张玮 off his hit song, Whataya Want From Me which exploded with praise on Sina Weibo, China's Twitter-like service.
