= Beautiful and Neat Room =

- Directed by: Maria Petschnig
- Written by: Maria Petschnig, Thomas Brooks
- Produced by: Maria Petschnig
- Starring: Charlotte Aubin
- Cinematography: Jamal Solomon, Maria Petschnig
- Edited by: Maria Petschnig
- Music by: Christoper LaRose
- Release date: 2025
- Running time: 118 minutes

Beautiful and Neat Room is a 2025 feature film written, directed, and produced by Maria Petschnig. It was premiered in competition at the Split Film Festival in September 2025, where it won the Grand Prix for Best Feature.

The movie is inspired by Petschnig's own experiences, having shared her living space with more than 60 roommates over the course of 22 years. She has told The New York Times that sharing her apartment was “a way to survive as an artist in New York City”.

== Synopsis ==
The film follows Marie, a struggling artist living in Brooklyn who sublets a room in her apartment to make ends meet. Over time, she shares her living space with a succession of increasingly eccentric and disruptive roommates. These experiences lead the protagonist to reconsider their relationships with others and their own thoughts and behavior.

During her therapy sessions with Kevin, Marie discusses her frustrations. At the same time, her relationship is deteriorating.

== Cast ==
- Charlotte Aubin as Marie
- Ari Brand as Rafer
- Erica Sarda as Niki
- Mark Bracich as Kevin
- Adam Ratcliffe as Brad
- Jordan Dallam as Jay
- Julie Chapin as Paulis
- Jefrey B. Wilkerson as James
- Kevin Trinio Perdido as Eden

== Production ==
The script, which she wrote together with Thomas Brooks, draws inspiration from her experiences of cohabitation with many different people, most of them complete strangers - ever since having moved to Brooklyn in 2003. The film addresses a number of social issues, most prominently the troubled housing market with its sky-high rents.

The film was filmed almost entirely in Petschnig’s rent-stabilized apartment in Park Slope.

While all the scripted scenes were shot by cinematographer Jamal Solomon, the city-clips were filmed and assembled by Petschnig herself.

== Reception ==
The 2026 Critic's Week in Berlin described it as “a bitingly absurd comedy about artist clichés, human neuroses, and eccentricities within the confined space of the apartment.” At the Canadian Premiere and according to the Victoria Film Festival “the film is an intimate, provocative meditation on creativity, survival, and the quirks of human behavior.” The 27th Buenos Aires International Festival of Independent Cinema described the film as ‘an immense achievement’ and ‘a comedy about eccentricity, discomfort, loneliness, and sadness.’
