= Our Own =

Our Own may refer to:

- Our Own (2004 film), a Russian action drama film
- Our Own (2020 film), a Canadian drama film
- Our Own (Metalcore Band), a British Metalcore band
