= Félix-Antoine Duval =

Canadian actor (born 1992)

Félix-Antoine Duval (born February 4, 1992) is a Canadian film and television actor, most noted for his leading roles in the films Saint-Narcisse (2020) and Shepherds (Bergers) (2024).

He was born in Caraquet, New Brunswick, and grew up in Beauceville, Quebec. He had various small film and television roles until he was cast in a leading role as Cédric, a teenager recovering from serious injuries sustained in a car accident, in the 2015 limited series Pour Sarah, for which he received a Gémeaux Award nomination for Best Actor in a Dramatic Series in 2016.

At the Toronto Film Critics Association Awards 2024, he was named the winner of the award for Outstanding Performance in a Canadian Film for Shepherds.

== Filmography ==
=== Film ===
Year	Title	Role	Notes
2014	Corbo	René	
2014	Henri Henri	Young man at the canteen	
2014	The Apparatus of Destruction (L'Appareil de la déstruction)	Louis	
2015	Death Dive (Le Scaphandrier)	Adult zombie	
2020	Saint-Narcisse	Dominic/Daniel	
2024	Shepherds (Bergers)	Mathyas	

=== Television ===
Year	Title	Role	Notes
2012	La boîte à malle		
2014	Les Jeunes Loups	Ali's friend	One episode
2014	Au secours de Béatrice	Young man in difficulty	One episode
2015	Pour Sarah	Cédric Dutil	Leading role; ten episodes
2015–16	Subito Texto	Francis Beaucage	Four episodes
2016	Jérémie	Anthony	One episode
2016	L'Échappée	Xavier Étienne	Eight episodes
2018	Victor Lessard	Dante Salvador	Nine episodes
2018	La Malédiction de Jonathan Plourde	Jonathan Plourde	Leading role; six episodes
2021	La Faille	Adrien Lacombe	
2022	Fragments	Tomas	Ten episodes
2023	Ailleurs qu'icitte	Chris	Five episodes
