= Joan Chen =

Chinese-born American actress and director

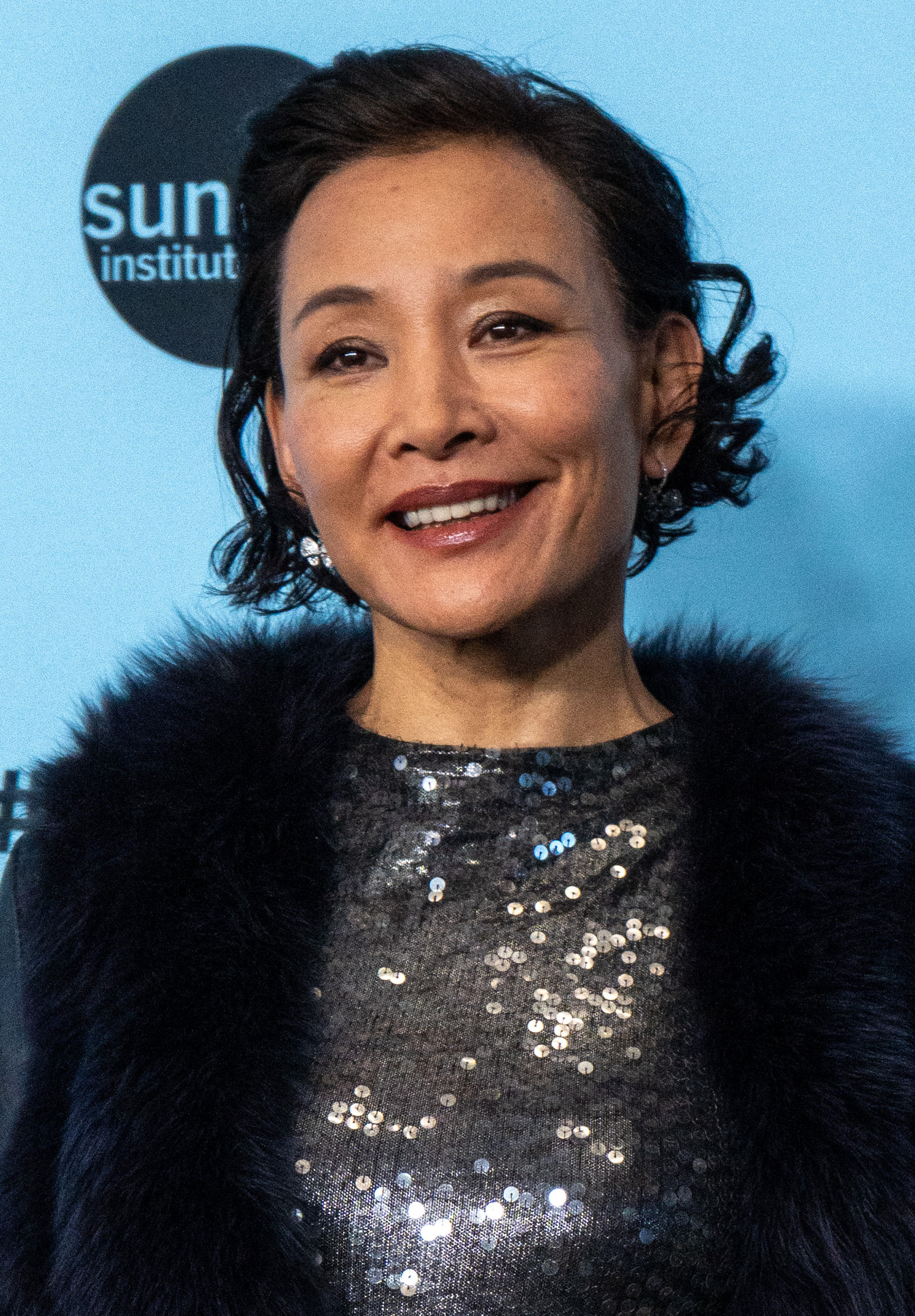
- Chen in 2025
- Born: 陳沖 (Chen Chong); April 26, 1961 (age 65); Shanghai, China
- Citizenship: United States
- Occupations: Actress, director
- Years active: 1975–present
- Spouses: Jim Lau (m. 1985; div. 1990); Peter Hui (m. 1992)
- Children: 2

Chinese name
- Traditional Chinese: 陳冲
- Simplified Chinese: 陈冲
Transcriptions
Standard Mandarin
- Hanyu Pinyin: Chén Chōng
Yue: Cantonese
- Jyutping: Can4 Cung1

Joan Chen (simplified Chinese; 陈冲; born April 26, 1961) is a Chinese-born American actress and film director. She is the recipient of numerous accolades, including four Taipei Golden Horse Awards and an AACTA Award. She made her film debut in the Chinese film Youth (1977) before starring in the film Little Flower (1979). She came to the attention of American audiences for her portrayal of Wanrong in the Bernardo Bertolucci historical epic film The Last Emperor (1987), which won nine Academy Awards including Best Picture.

She is also known for her leading roles in Heaven & Earth (1993), Golden Gate (1994), Red Rose White Rose (1994), Saving Face (2004), Sunflower (2005), and The Home Song Stories (2007) with supporting roles in Lust, Caution (2007), Tigertail (2020), and Dìdi (2024). As a filmmaker she directed the feature films Xiu Xiu: The Sent Down Girl (1998), Autumn in New York (2000), English (2018) and Hero (2022).

On television, she is most known for her recurring role as Jocelyn 'Josie' Packard in the David Lynch-created surrealist drama series Twin Peaks (1990–1991). She also portrayed Madame Chiang Kai-shek in the HBO film Hemingway & Gellhorn (2012), Chabi in the Netflix series Marco Polo (2014–2016) and Lu Mei in the FX on Hulu series A Murder at the End of the World (2023).

== Early life ==
Chen was born in Shanghai, to a family of pharmacologists. She and her older brother, Chase, were raised during the Cultural Revolution. At the age of 14, Chen was discovered on the school rifle range by Jiang Qing, the wife of leader Mao Zedong and major Chinese Communist Party figure, for excelling at marksmanship. This led to her being selected for the Actors' Training Program by the Shanghai Film Studio in 1975, where she was discovered by veteran director Xie Jin who chose her to star in his 1977 film Youth as a deaf mute whose senses are restored by an army medical team. Chen graduated from high school a year in advance, and at the age of 17 entered Shanghai International Studies University, where she majored in English.

== Career ==
=== 1979–1984: Early career in China ===
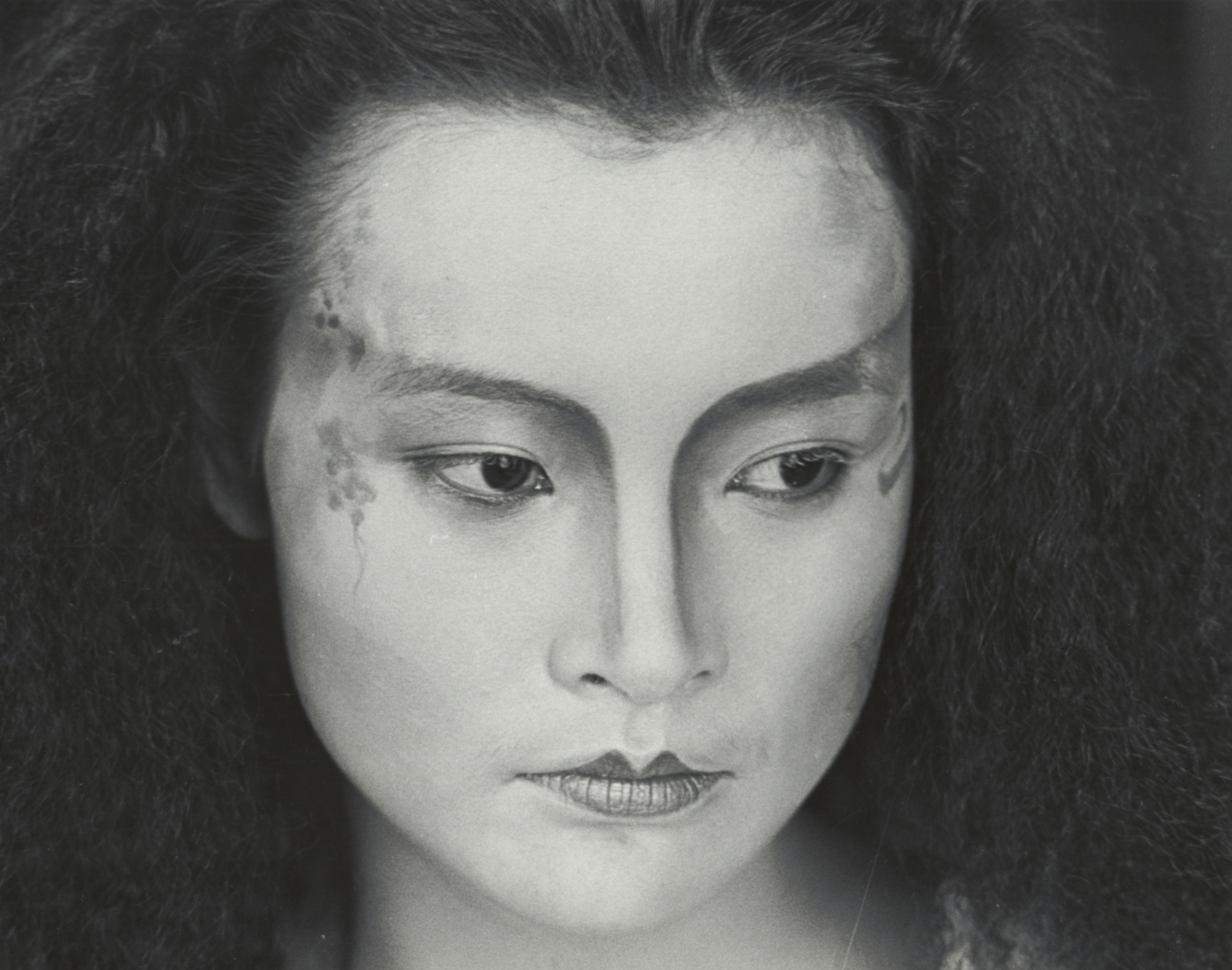
Chen in fantasy makeup for the 1985 film Dim Sum: A Little Bit of Heart

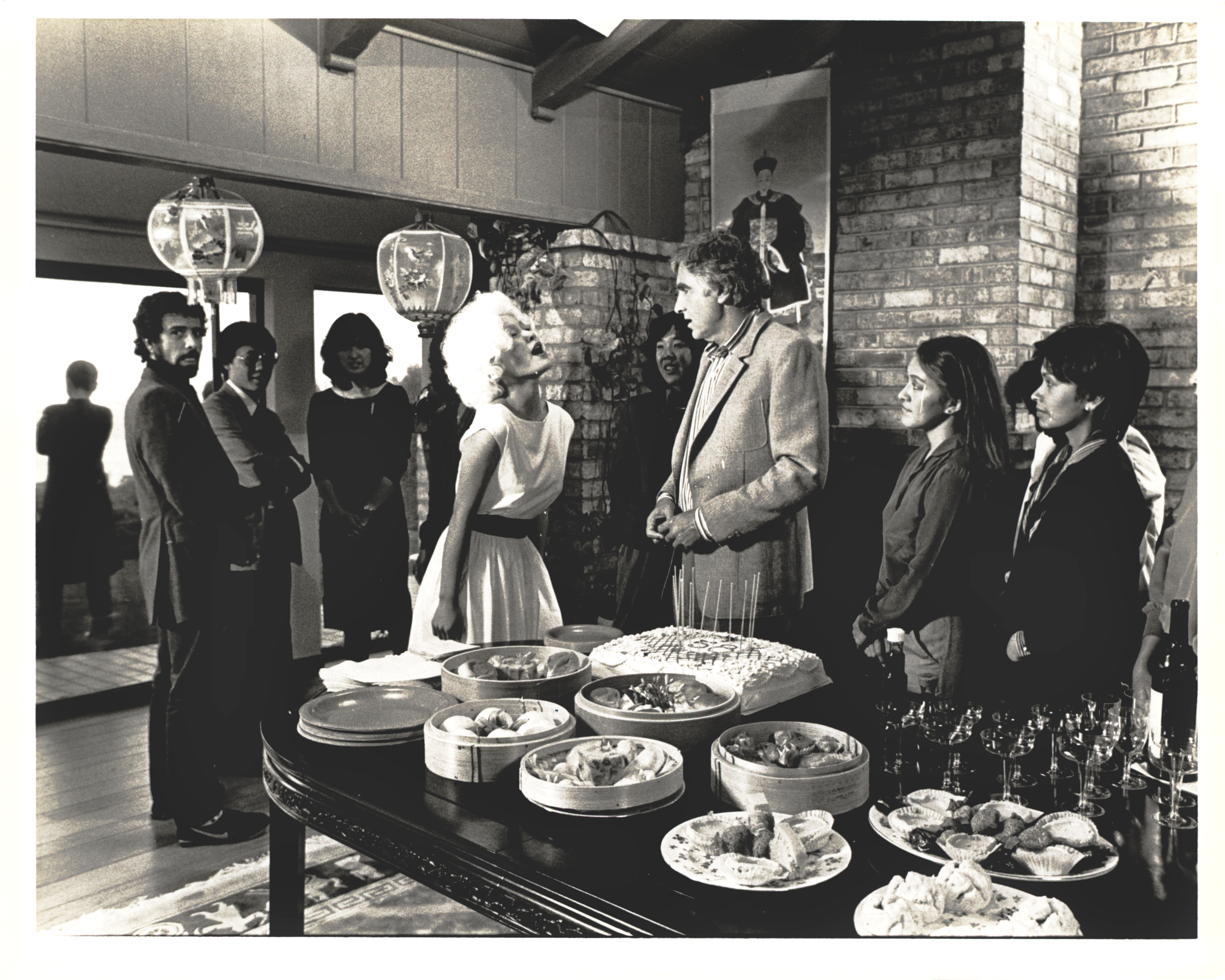
Chen in the 1985 film Dim Sum: A Little Bit of Heart

Chen performed alongside Liu Xiaoqing, Tang Guoqiang and Ge Cunzhuang in Zhang Zheng's (simplified Chinese: 张铮; traditional Chinese: 張錚; pinyin: Zhāng Zhēng) Little Flower in 1979, for which she won the Hundred Flowers Award for Best Actress. Chen portrayed a pre-Maoist revolutionary's daughter, who, reunited with her brother, a wounded Communist soldier, later learned that his doctor was her biological mother. Little Flower was her second film and she soon achieved the status of China's most-loved actress; she was dubbed "the Elizabeth Taylor of China" by Time magazine for having achieved stardom while still a teenager.

In addition, Chen was in the 1979 film Hearts for the Motherland. The film directed by Ou Fan (欧凡; 歐凡; Ōu Fán) and Xing Jitian (邢吉田; Xíng Jítián) depicts an overseas Chinese family that returns to China from Southeast Asia out of their patriotic feelings but encounter political troubles during the Cultural Revolution. The songs, "I Love You, China" and "High Flies the Petrel" (高飞的海燕; 高飛的海燕; Gāofēi de Hǎiyàn), sung by Chen's character, are perennial favorites in China. In 1981, Chen starred in Awakening (苏醒; 甦醒; Sūxǐng), directed by Teng Wenji.

=== 1985–1999: Hollywood and Twin Peaks ===
At age 20, Chen moved to the United States, where she studied filmmaking at California State University, Northridge. Her first Hollywood movie was Tai-Pan, filmed on location in China. In 1985, she appeared in the American television show Miami Vice as May Ying, former wife of Martin Castillo and husband to Ma Sek in the episode "Golden Triangle (Part II)". She went on to portray the Last Empress Wanrong in Bernardo Bertolucci's The Last Emperor, which won 9 Academy Awards in 1988, including Best Picture. She then starred in the David Lynch/Mark Frost television series Twin Peaks as Josie Packard. She starred alongside Rutger Hauer in 1989's The Blood of Heroes, written and directed by David Webb Peoples. In 1993, she co-starred in Oliver Stone's Heaven & Earth. She portrayed two different characters in Clara Law's Temptation of a Monk: a seductive princess of Tang dynasty, and a dangerous temptress. She shaved her head on-screen for the role. The award-winning film was adapted from a novel by Lilian Lee.

In 1994, she co-starred with Steven Seagal in the action-adventure On Deadly Ground. She also returned to Shanghai to star in Stanley Kwan's Red Rose White Rose opposite Winston Chao, and subsequently won a Golden Horse Award and a Hong Kong Film Critics Society Award for her performance. In 1996, she served as a jury member at the 46th Berlin International Film Festival.

Tired of being cast as an exotic beauty in Hollywood films, Chen moved into directing in 1998 with the critically acclaimed Xiu Xiu: The Sent Down Girl, adapted from the novella Celestial Bath (Chinese: 天浴; pinyin: Tiān Yù) by her friend Geling Yan. She later directed Autumn in New York, starring Richard Gere and Winona Ryder, in 2000.

=== 2000–present: International acclaim ===
In the middle of the 2000s, Chen made a comeback in acting and began to work intensely, alternating between English and Chinese-language roles. In 2004, she starred in Hou Yong's family saga Jasmine Women, alongside Zhang Ziyi, in which they played multiple roles as daughters and mothers across three generations in Shanghai. She also starred in the Asian-American comedy Saving Face as a widowed mother, who is shunned by the Chinese-American community for being pregnant and unwed and has come to live with her lesbian daughter. In 2005, she appeared in Zhang Yang's family saga Sunflower, as a mother whose husband and son have a troubled father-son relationship over 30 years. She starred in the Asian American independent film Americanese and in Michael Almereyda's Tonight at Noon, the first part of a two part project, scheduled to be released in 2009.

In 2007, Chen was acclaimed for her performance in Tony Ayres' drama The Home Song Stories. She portrayed a glamorous and unstable Chinese nightclub singer who struggles to survive in 1970s Australia with her two children. The performance earned her multiple awards, including the Australian Film Institute Award for Best Actress and the Golden Horse Award for Best Leading Actress. The same year saw her co-starring in two other acclaimed films: Ang Lee's Lust, Caution, opposite Tony Leung Chiu-Wai, and Jiang Wen's The Sun Also Rises, opposite Anthony Wong Chau-Sang, for which she received the Asian Film Award for Best Supporting Actress.

In 2008, she starred alongside Sam Chow (simplified Chinese: 邹爽; traditional Chinese: 鄒爽; pinyin: Zōu Shuǎng) in Shi Qi (十七; Shíqī), directed by Joe Chow (姬诚; 姬誠; Jī Chéng), as a rural mother of a 17-year-old in eastern Zhejiang province. The same year Joan Chen portrayed a factory worker in Jia Zhangke's 24 City once fancied because she resembled Chen herself in the 1979 film Little Flower, but who missed her chance at love. She co-starred in Bruce Beresford's 2009 adaptation of the autobiography of dancer Li Cunxin, Mao's Last Dancer, along with Wang Shuangbao (王双宝; 王雙寶; Wáng Shuāngbǎo) and Kyle MacLachlan.

In 2009, Chen starred alongside Feng Yuanzheng and Liu Jinshan in the Chinese TV series Newcomers to the Middle-Aged (人到中年; Rén Dào Zhōngnián), directed by Dou Qi (斗琪; Dòu Qí), in which she played a female doctor facing middle-age problems. She also played the part of goddess Guan Yin in the 2010 Chinese TV adaptation of Journey to the West, directed by Cheng Lidong (程力栋; 程力棟; Chéng Lìdòng). In October 2009 Joan Chen was the curator of the first Singapore Sun Festival, whose theme was "The Art of Living Well". She selected five films for screening during the festival: The Diving Bell and the Butterfly, Dead Man Walking, Hannah and Her Sisters, Still Life and Edward Scissorhands.

In 2010, Chen joined the cast of Wang Leehom's directorial debut Love in Disguise, Alexi Tan's (陈奕利; 陳奕利; Chén Yìlì) Color Me Love (爱出色; 愛出色; Ài Chūsè; alongside Liu Ye), Ilkka Järvi-Laturi's Kiss, His First (alongside Tony Leung Ka-fai and Gwei Lun-mei) and veteran acting coach Larry Moss' Relative Insanity (along with Juliette Binoche). In May 2010, she was set to star and direct one of the three parts of the anthology film Seeing Red. In 2011, Chen played Secretary Bishop's girlfriend on the television series Fringe episode "Immortality". Chen was cast as the Mongol Yuan Dynasty empress Chabi in the 2014 American television series Marco Polo. Being somewhat unfamiliar with the Mongols, Chen read The Secret History of the Mongol Queens in order to prepare for the role. She also appeared in several episodes of the 2018 Chinese television drama Ruyi's Royal Love in the Palace as Ula Nara Yixiu (the Empress Xiaojingxian).

In 2014, Chen served as a jury member at the 71st Venice International Film Festival. In the same year, Chen presided over the jury for the 51st Golden Horse Awards. In 2023, she played a caring and compassionate mother to a rebellious teenager in the coming of age comedy-drama Dìdi directed by Sean Wang. Angi Han of The Hollywood Reporter wrote of her performance, that the "role often trusts her remarkable ability to convey a lifetime’s worth of regret or joy or swallowed anger through a simple gaze". For her performance, she was nominated for the Independent Spirit Award for Best Supporting Performance.

== Personal life ==
In 1981, Chen left China to study at the State University of New York at New Paltz, before transferring to the California State University, Northridge.

From 1985 to 1990, Chen was married to actor Jim "Jimmy" Lau.

In 1989, she became a naturalized citizen of the United States.

On January 18, 1992, Chen married her second husband, cardiologist Peter Hui. They have two daughters.

On April 9, 2008, Chen wrote an article entitled "Let the Games Go On" for The Washington Post objecting to the politicization of the 2008 Summer Olympics in Beijing.

=== Charitable work ===
In May 2008, Chen appeared alongside James Kyson Lee, Silas Flensted, and Amy Hanaialiʻi Gilliom in a public service announcement for the Banyan Tree Project campaign to stop HIV/AIDS-related stigma in Asian & Pacific Islander communities.

In October 2008, Chen made the cover of Trends Health magazine alongside actresses Ke Lan (Chinese: 柯蓝) and Ma Yili (Chinese: 马伊琍) to promote the Chinese Pink Ribbon Breast Cancer Prevention campaign.

On January 8, 2010, Chen attended, alongside Nancy Pelosi, Nicole Kidman, and Joe Torre, the ceremony to help Family Violence Prevention Fund break ground on a new center located in the Presidio of San Francisco intended to combat violence against women and children. During the ceremony, Chen performed an excerpt from the documentary play The Thumbprint of Mukhtar Mai (presented as part of "Seven").

On January 15, 2010, Chen was set to appear, along with other Asian American personalities, in a series of videos supporting the Center for the Pacific Asian Family.

== Social impact ==
Chen has contributed to the Asian LGBTQ+ community in the US by starring in several LGBTQ+ films, with the most famous ones being Saving Face and Montreal, My Beautiful. Saving Face was released in 2004, when it released it was rare to see works on topics related to Asian LGBTQ+ community. However, this movie demonstrated not only Asian LGBTQ+ community’s life, but also some typical Chinese family’s life and relationship. It became a classic film widely, and has become reference for people wishing to learn about the life of these communities.

Chen has also been very dedicated in advocating for the Asian American or broader immigrant community. She said publicly, while in an interview, that a very important reason for her choosing her latest character in Montreal, My Beautiful was because she felt strongly connected to the immigrant background of the character. She, in other interviews, is also actively expressing her thoughts on the experience as an Asian actress in the US – how hard it was being the minority in Hollywood and the lower visibility for most Asian actors. These behaviors has made her one of the most iconic figures among all Asian actors in the US.

== Filmography ==
=== Actress ===
==== Film ====
Year	Title	Role	Notes
1977	Youth	Shen Yamei	
1979	Little Flower	Zhao Xiaohua	
1979	Hearts for the Motherland	Huang Sihua	
1981	Awakening	Su Xiaomei	
1985	Dim Sum: A Little Bit of Heart	Young M.J. player	
1986	Goodbye My Love	Ling Ti	
1986	Tai-Pan	May–May	
1987	The Night Stalker	Mai Wing	
1987	The Last Emperor	Wanrong	
1989	The Salute of the Jugger	Kidda	Aka The Blood of Heroes
1991	Wedlock	Noelle	
1992	Turtle Beach	Minou	
1992	Twin Peaks: Fire Walk with Me	Jocelyn 'Josie' Packard	Scene deleted – see Twin Peaks: The Missing Pieces
1993	Temptation of a Monk	Princess Hong'e (Scarlet); Lady Qingshou (Violet)	
1993	Heaven & Earth	Mama	
1994	Golden Gate	Marilyn	
1994	On Deadly Ground	Masu	
1994	Red Rose White Rose	Wang Jiao-Rui	
1995	The Hunted	Kirina	
1995	Wild Side	Virginia Chow	Also associate producer
1995	Judge Dredd	Ilsa Hayden	
1996	Precious Find	Camilla Jones	
1999	Purple Storm	Shirley Kwan	
2000	What's Cooking?	Trinh Nguyen	
2004	Jasmine Women	Mo's Mother / Mo	
2004	Saving Face	Hwei-Lan Gao	
2004	Avatar	Madame Ong	
2005	Sunflower	Xiuqing	
2006	Americanese	Betty Nguyen	
2007	The Home Song Stories	Rose Hong	
2007	Lust, Caution	Mrs. Yee	
2007	The Sun Also Rises	Dr. Lin	
2008	The Leap Years	Li-Ann (age 49)	
2008	All God's Children Can Dance	Evelyn	
2008	Shi Qi	Mother	
2008	24 City	Gu Minhua	
2009	Mao's Last Dancer	Niang	
2010	Love in Disguise	Joan	
2010	Color Me Love	Zoe	
2011	1911	Empress Longyu	
2012	White Frog	Irene Young	
2012	Passion Island	Johanna	
2012	Let It Be	Niu Jie	
2012	Double Xposure	Dr. Hao	
2014	For Love or Money	Xu's Mother	
2014	Twin Peaks: The Missing Pieces	Jocelyn 'Josie' Packard	
2015	You Are My Sunshine	Pei Fangmei	
2015	Lady of the Dynasty	Consort Wu	
2015	Cairo Declaration	Soong Ching-ling	
2019	Sheep Without a Shepherd	Laoorn	
2020	Tigertail	Yuan	
2020	Ava	Toni	
2023	Under the Light	He Xiuli	
2024	Dìdi	Chungsing Wang	Also executive producer
2025	The Wedding Banquet	May Chen	
2025	Oh. What. Fun.	Jeanne Wang-Wasserman	
2025	Montreal, My Beautiful (Montréal, ma belle)	Feng Xia	
2026	Remarkably Bright Creatures	Janice Kim	

==== Television ====
Year	Title	Role	Notes
1983	Matt Houston	Miss Taipei	Episode: "Target: Miss World"
1984	The New Mike Hammer	Ti	Episode: "Hot Ice"
1984	Knight Rider	Su-Lin	Episode: "Knight of the Drones"
1985	Miami Vice	May Ying	Episode: "Golden Triangle"
1985	Double Dare	Lily Chang	Episode: "Hong Kong King Con"
1985	American Playhouse	Mei Lai	Episode: "Paper Angels"
1985	MacGyver	Lin	Episode: "The Golden Triangle"
1988	HeartBeat	Cathryn	Episode: "Pilot"
1989	Wiseguy	Maxine Tzu	Episode: "All or Nothing"
1990–1991	Twin Peaks	Jocelyn 'Josie' Packard	TV series — Series regular (2 seasons)
1992	Nightmare Cafe	Cafe Customer	Episode: "Nightmare Cafe"
1992	Strangers	The Girl	TV movie
1992	Children of the Dragon	Jin-Juan	Miniseries
1992	Shadow of a Stranger	Vanessa	TV movie
1993	Tales from the Crypt	Connie	Episode: "Food for Thought"
1997	Homicide: Life on the Street	Elizabeth Wu	Episode: "Wu's on First?"
1997	Happily Ever After: Fairy Tales for Every Child	Princess Jade (voice)	Episode: "Aladdin"
1998	The Outer Limits	Major Dara Talif	Episode: "Phobos Rising"
1999	In a Class of His Own	Linda Ching	TV movie
2009	Newcomers to the Middle-Aged	Tian Wenjie	TV series
2010	Journey to the West	Guan Yin	TV series
2011	Fringe	Reiko	Episode: "Immortality"
2012	Hemingway & Gellhorn	Madame Chiang Kai-shek	HBO TV movie
2012	Heroes of Sui and Tang Dynasties	Empress Dugu	TV series
2013	Serangoon Road	Patricia Cheng	10 episodes
2013	Meng's Palace 海上孟府	Er Jie	TV series
2014–2016	Marco Polo	Chabi	20 episodes
2017	Twin Peaks	Jocelyn 'Josie' Packard	Episode: "Part 17", archive footage
2018	Ruyi's Royal Love in the Palace	Ula Nara Yixiu	6 episodes
2023	A Murder at the End of the World	Lu Mei	6 episodes

=== Filmmaker ===
Year	Title	Notes
1995	Wild Side	Associate producer
1998	Xiu Xiu: The Sent Down Girl	
2000	Autumn in New York	
2018	English	
2022	Hero	

== Awards and nominations ==
Award	Year	Category	Work	Result	Ref.
AARP Movies for Grownups Awards	2025	Best Supporting Actress	Dìdi	Won	
Asian American International Film Festival	1994	Asian American Media Award	—N/a	Won	
Asian Film Awards	2008	Best Actress	The Home Song Stories	Nominated	
Asian Film Awards	2008	Best Supporting Actress	The Sun Also Rises	Won	
Asia Pacific Screen Awards	2007	Best Performance by an Actress	The Home Song Stories	Nominated	
Asia Society	2024	Asia Entertainment Gamer Changer Award	—N/a	Honored	
Australian Film Institute Awards	2007	Best Actress in a Leading Role	The Home Song Stories	Won	
Berlin International Film Festival	1998	Golden Bear	Xiu Xiu: The Sent Down Girl	Nominated	
CAAMFest	2012	Award for Achievement in Citizen Journalism	—N/a	Honored	
Capri Hollywood International Film Festival	2007	Capri Global Award	Lust, Caution	Won	
Chicago International Film Festival	1998	Gold Hugo	Xiu Xiu: The Sent Down Girl	Nominated	
Critics Choice Association	2024	Career Achievement Award	—N/a	Honored	
Denver Film Festival	2024	Career Achievement Award	Dìdi	Honored	
EDA Awards	2024	Best Supporting Actress	Dìdi	Nominated	
Festival du Film de Paris	1999	Grand Prix	Xiu Xiu: The Sent Down Girl	Nominated	
Festival du Film de Paris	1999	Special Jury Prize	Xiu Xiu: The Sent Down Girl	Won	
Film Critics Circle of Australia	2008	Best Actress	The Home Song Stories	Won	
Fort Lauderdale International Film Festival	1998	Best Drama	Xiu Xiu: The Sent Down Girl	Won	
Golden Raspberry Awards	1987	Worst Actress	Tai-Pan	Nominated	
Golden Raspberry Awards	1987	Worst New Star	Tai-Pan	Nominated	
Golden Raspberry Awards	1995	Worst Actress	On Deadly Ground	Nominated	
Hawaiʻi International Film Festival	2007	Achievement in Acting	The Home Song Stories	Won	
Hong Kong Film Critics Society Awards	1994	Best Actress	Red Rose White Rose	Won	
Hong Kong Film Awards	1995	Best Actress	Red Rose White Rose	Nominated	
Hundred Flowers Awards	1980	Best Actress	Little Flower	Won	
Independent Spirit Awards	2000	Best First Feature (Over $500,000) (shared with Alice Chan Wai-Chung)	Xiu Xiu: The Sent Down Girl	Nominated	
Independent Spirit Awards	2025	Best Supporting Performance	Dìdi	Nominated	
Inside Film Awards	2007	Best Actress	The Home Song Stories	Won	
Inside Film Awards	2010	Best Actress	Mao's Last Dancer	Nominated	
Macau International Movie Festival	2020	Best Actress	Sheep Without a Shepherd	Nominated	
Mons International Film Festival	1999	Grand Prize	Xiu Xiu: The Sent Down Girl	Won	
National Board of Review	1999	International Freedom Award	Xiu Xiu: The Sent Down Girl	Won	
Newport Beach Film Festival	2024	Career Achievement Award	—N/a	Honored	
New York Asian Film Festival	2026	Star Asia Lifetime Achievement Award	Honouring her career spanning 50 years	Honored	
Reelworld Film Festival	2025	Outstanding Feature Actress	Montreal, My Beautiful	Won	
San Diego Asian Film Festival	2005	Lifetime Achievement Award	—N/a	Honored	
San Diego Film Critics Society	2024	Best Supporting Actress	Dìdi	Nominated	
San Francisco Bay Area Film Critics Circle	2024	Best Supporting Actress	Dìdi	Won	
San Francisco International Film Festival	2024	Career Tribute Award	—N/a	Honored	
Seattle Film Critics Society	2024	Best Supporting Actress	Dìdi	Nominated	
Shanghai International Film Festival	2008	Press Prize for Most Attractive Actress	Shi Qi	Won	
Shanghai Television Festival	2024	Best Actress in a Supporting Role	The Heart	Nominated	
Singapore International Film Festival	2018	Cinema Legend Award	—N/a	Honored	
South by Southwest	2006	Special Jury Prize for Outstanding Ensemble Cast (shared with Ben Shenkman, Chris Tashima, Kelly Hu and Allison Sie)	Americanese	Won	
Sundance Film Festival	2024	U.S. Dramatic Special Jury Award for Best Ensemble (shared with Izaac Wang, Shirley Chen and Chang Li Hua)	Dìdi	Won	
Taipei Golden Horse Awards	1994	Best Leading Actress	Red Rose White Rose	Won	
Taipei Golden Horse Awards	1998	Best Director	Xiu Xiu: The Sent Down Girl	Won	
Taipei Golden Horse Awards	1998	Best Adapted Screenplay (shared with Geling Yan)	Xiu Xiu: The Sent Down Girl	Won	
Taipei Golden Horse Awards	2007	Best Leading Actress	The Home Song Stories	Won	
Torino Film Festival	2007	Best Actress	The Home Song Stories	Won	
Toronto Film Critics Association	2025	Outstanding Lead Performance in a Canadian Film	Montreal, My Beautiful	Won	

== Other media ==
- 2008: "Shanghai," narrator—an audio walking tour by Louis Vuitton and Soundwalk

== Other recognition ==
- Chen was named one of the "Fifty Most Beautiful People" by People magazine in 1992.
- Chen inspired the American experimental rock band Xiu Xiu, named after her film Xiu Xiu: The Sent Down Girl, according to singer-songwriter Jamie Stewart.
- Chen was chosen by Goldsea as Number 45 on its compilation of "The 120 Most Inspiring Asian Americans of All Time".

== Works cited ==
- "The Last Empress", by C. Mark Jacobson. Interview. December 1987. p. 146-147.
- "In Praise of Actors: Joan Chen", by Peter Rainer. American Film. Volume 15: Issue 8. May 1990. p. 32.
- "Heavenly And Hearthy", by Tom Kagy. Goldsea Asian American Daily. August 1992.
- "Chen Reaction", by Alison Dakota Gee. Movieline (USA). December 1993. p. 54-59, 88.
- "Joan of Art", by Richard Corliss. TIME (USA). April 5, 1999.
- "West To East", by Richard Corliss. TIME (USA). Volume 153: Issue 13. April 5, 1999.
- Sragow, Michael (May 27, 1999). "Joan Chen: Guerilla Director". Salon.com. Archived from the original on August 16, 2006.
- "Reel Poetry", by Kevin Berger. San Francisco (USA). July 2000. p. 51.
- Lidz, Franz (August 2000). "Joan Chen: Whether it's China or Hollywood, this actress/director tells it like it is". Interview. 30 (8): 80–81. Archived from the original on March 23, 2006 – via FindArticles.
- "An Interview with Joan Chen", by Michelle Caswell. Asia Source. November 2000.
- "Is Joan Chen Done with Hollywood?" Goldsea Asian American Daily. January 28, 2003.
- "Joan Chen's Wild Side", by Malinda Lo. Curve. Volume 15: Issue 4. June 2005.
- "The Face Behind Saving Face", by Kenny Tanemura. Asian Week. June 3, 2005.
- "Sensuously Elegant: An Interview with Joan Chen", by Lisa Odham Stokes. Asian Cult Cinema (USA). Issue 48. October–December 2005. p. 51-61.
- "The Many Faces of Joan Chen.", by Glen Schaefer. The Province. October 3, 2007.
