= Saint-Narcisse (film) =

- Film poster
- Directed by: Bruce LaBruce
- Written by: Martin Girard; Bruce LaBruce
- Produced by: Nicolas Comeau; Paul Scherzer
- Starring: Félix-Antoine Duval; Tania Kontoyanni; Alexandra Petrachuck; Andreas Apergis
- Cinematography: Michel La Veaux
- Edited by: Hubert Hayaud
- Music by: Christophe Lamarche-Ledoux
- Production companies: 1976 Productions; Six Island Productions
- Distributed by: Best Friend Forever; Raven Banner Entertainment
- Release date: September 2020 (Venice)
- Running time: 101 minutes
- Country: Canada
- Languages: English; French
- Budget: $2 million

Saint-Narcisse is a 2020 Canadian comedy-drama film, directed by Bruce LaBruce. Set in Quebec in 1972, the film stars Félix-Antoine Duval as Dominic and Daniel, a pair of identical twins who were separated at birth and did not previously know of each other's existence, but who fall in love and begin an incestuous relationship.

The cast also includes Tania Kontoyanni, Alexandra Petrachuck, Andreas Apergis and Angèle Coutu.

== Production ==
The film was produced by 1976 Productions and Six Island Productions. It had financial backing from CBC Films, Telefilm, and SODEC.

== Release ==
The film premiered in the Venice Days stream at the 77th Venice International Film Festival. It will be distributed by Best Friend Forever internationally, and by Northern Banner Entertainment (a part of Raven Banner Entertainment) and AZ Films in Canada.

== Reception ==
On the review aggregator website Rotten Tomatoes, 96% of 24 critics' reviews are positive. Metacritic, which uses a weighted average, assigned the film a score of 70 out of 100, based on 5 critics, indicating "generally favorable" reviews.

On The Guardian, Phuong Le rated it 3/5 stars writing that "Saint-Narcisse is a welcome blast of subversive naughtiness, proving that a film can tackle social taboos while refusing to brand itself with facile markers of respectability." Wendy Ide of The Observer rated it 2/5 stars describing the film as "a bit too self-involved to be much fun for anyone else."

On Film Threat, Bradley Gibson wrote that "director-writer Bruce LaBruce has long been famous as the master of Canadian 'queercore' cinema, and he has achieved in Saint-Narcisse his magnum opus." Teo Bugbee of The New York Times described the film as "a handsomely produced film with sincere performances, lush cinematography and a classical score."

== See also ==
- List of LGBT-related films of 2020
