= Montreal, My Beautiful =

- French: Montréal, ma belle
- Directed by: Xiaodan He
- Screenplay by: Xiaodan He
- Produced by: Christine Falco; Xiaodan He
- Starring: Joan Chen; Charlotte Aubin
- Cinematography: Marie Davignon
- Edited by: Tao Gu
- Music by: Gaétan Gravel
- Production companies: Films Camera Oscura; Red Dawn Productions
- Distributed by: Filmoption International
- Release date: October 12, 2025 (FNC)
- Running time: 117 minutes
- Country: Canada
- Languages: French; Mandarin

Montreal, My Beautiful (French: Montréal, ma belle) is a 2025 Canadian drama film, directed by Xiaodan He. The film stars Joan Chen as Feng Xia, a Chinese Canadian immigrant wife and mother living in Montreal, Quebec, who embarks on a journey of self-discovery when she meets and falls in love with Camille (Charlotte Aubin), a free-spirited younger woman.

The cast also includes John Xu, Pei Yao Xu, Anzhe (Angelo) Zhang, Jean-Guy Bouchard, Isabelle Miquelon, Zion-Luna Ribeaux Valdès, Annette Garant, Éloi Archambaudoin, Wensi Yan, Pantelis Palioudakis and Amélie Pelletier in supporting roles.

== Plot ==
A Chinese immigrant, Feng Xia, runs a grocery store alongside her husband in Quebec. During her French classes, she meets a gay man from Cuba in a chance encounter, who introduces her to dating apps. Feng decides to give it a try herself; while checking out the profiles on a dating site she finds Camille, who becomes her love interest. The two become friends but hook up occasionally without becoming anything official. Camille and Feng get very close as Feng's warm and sincere friendship helps Camille navigate her trust issues and problems with her estranged mother. During this time, Camille treats their romantic relationship casually while Feng does not; this leads to an altercation, which gives Camille the space to realise what she truly wants from Feng. Camille gets very drunk that night and has an attack of gastritis through which Feng stays by her side, allowing them to reconcile.

Feng's husband becomes suspicious and secretly follows her as she goes over to Camille's place, discovering Feng and Camille's relationship. He then becomes abusive towards Feng and threatens Camille at work. Feng and Camille nevertheless continue their relationship and take a trip to one of Camille's family's properties.

Feng's husband finds it difficult to deal with this situation and decides to move back to China with his family, leaving behind his daughter to pursue her education in Quebec. Feng agrees to leave Quebec with her husband and writes a letter to Camille letting her know of her departure and that she loves her and will remember her fondly.

The film ends with the family driving to the airport. During the car-ride, Feng, who had previously decided to leave Quebec, says that she no longer wants to leave and asks her husband to stop the vehicle. Her husband attempts to continue driving, but is eventually forced to pull off the road by the other family members.

== Distribution ==
The film was screened for distributors at the Cannes Film Market in May 2025, and had its public premiere in the Special Presentations program at the 2025 Festival du nouveau cinéma.

== Reception ==
La Presse described Montréal, ma belle as a bold film exploring the romantic relationship between a middle-aged Chinese immigrant woman and a younger Québécoise woman. The review praised Joan Chen’s performance as Feng Xia, noting her nuanced portrayal of the character’s inner conflict and emotions. The critic also highlighted the tenderness in the central relationship and the realistic depiction of intimacy. At the same time, the review mentioned narrative gaps, awkward dialogue, and some inexperienced supporting performances.

== Awards ==
Award	Year	Category	Recipient	Result	Reference
Windsor International Film Festival	2025	WIFF Prize in Canadian Film	Xiaodan He	Won	
Reelworld Film Festival	2025	Outstanding Feature Film Actress	Joan Chen	Won	
Toronto Reel Asian International Film Festival	2025	Best Canadian Film	Xiaodan He	Won	
Toronto Film Critics Association	2025	Outstanding Lead Performance in a Canadian Film	Joan Chen	Won	
Toronto Film Critics Association	2025	Outstanding Supporting Performance in a Canadian Film	Charlotte Aubin	Nominated	
Kingston Canadian Film Festival	2026	Cogeco People's Choice	Xiaodan He	Won	
