= Jeanne Leblanc =

Canadian film director and screenwriter

- Born: 27 September 1978 (age 47)
- Education: Université du Québec à Montréal Cégep régional de Lanaudière
- Occupation: Film Director

Jeanne Leblanc (born September 27, 1978) is a Canadian film director and screenwriter from Quebec, whose full-length directoral debut Isla Blanca was released in 2018.

== Career ==
She previously directed the short films Sortie de secours (2002), Le temps des récoltes (2009), One Night with You [Une nuit avec toi] (2011), Sullivan's Applicant (2012) and Carla en 10 secondes (2016).

Her second feature film, Our Own (Les Nôtres), premiered at the Rendez-vous Québec Cinéma in 2020.

In 2021 she was the patron and curator of the Festival Vues dans la tête de... film festival in Rivière-du-Loup.
