= Isla Blanca (film) =

- Directed by: Jeanne Leblanc
- Written by: Jeanne Leblanc
- Produced by: Hany Ouichou
- Starring: Charlotte Aubin; Judith Baribeau; Luc Picard; Théodore Pellerin
- Cinematography: Vincent Biron
- Edited by: Elric Robichon
- Music by: Devin Ashton-Beaucage
- Production companies: art & essai
- Release date: February 23, 2018 (RVQC)
- Running time: 80 minutes
- Country: Canada
- Language: French

Isla Blanca is a Canadian drama film, directed by Jeanne Leblanc and released in 2018. The film stars Charlotte Aubin as Mathilde, a young woman returning home to visit her family for the first time since running away from home several years earlier. The cast also includes Judith Baribeau as her mother Françoise, Luc Picard as her father Pierre, and Théodore Pellerin as her brother Émile.

The film premiered at the Rendez-vous Québec Cinéma in 2018, and was broadcast on television by Ici Radio-Canada Télé in April 2019.

Aubin received a Prix Iris nomination for Best Actress at the 20th Quebec Cinema Awards in 2018.
