= Sunflower (2005 film) =

2005 Chinese-Hong Kong film by Zhang Yang

- Film poster
- Directed by: Zhang Yang
- Written by: Cai Shangjun; Huo Xin; Zhang Yang
- Produced by: Han Sanping; Peter Loehr; Yang Buting
- Starring: Sun Haiying; Joan Chen; Liu Zifeng; Zhang Fan; Gao Ge; Wang Haidi
- Cinematography: Jong Lin
- Edited by: Yang Hongyu
- Music by: Lin Hai
- Distributed by: Fortissimo Films
- Release date: September 10, 2005 (Toronto)
- Running time: 129 minutes
- Countries: China; Hong Kong
- Language: Mandarin Chinese

Sunflower (Chinese: 向日葵; pinyin: Xiàngrìkúi) is a 2005 drama film directed by Zhang Yang. Zhang's fourth film, Sunflower is a joint production of Ming Productions, the Beijing Film Studio (as part of the China Film Corporation's 4th Production Company) and the Hong Kong subsidiary of the Netherlands-based Fortissimo Films. It was distributed by Fortissimo Films and New Yorker Films (US theatrical distribution).

The film stars Sun Haiying and Joan Chen as a husband and wife, and the actors Zhang Fan, Gao Ge and Wang Haidi as their son over the course of 30 years.

== Plot ==
The film is split into three main segments spanning thirty years. The first segment, in 1976, begins with the return of an artist, Gengnian to his wife, Xiuqing and son after several years of re-education during the Cultural Revolution. He returns however, with injured hands and can no longer continue as an artist. He instead hopes to cultivate artistic aspirations in his son, Xiangyang, who has taken to hurling stones at strangers with his friend Chicken Droppings. Though he eventually follows in his father's footsteps, Xiangyang resents his father's pressure and the two soon fall out.

The next segments, in 1987 when Xiangyang is a 19-year-old, and 1999, when he is in his 30s, continue to chart the course of Xiangyang and Gengnian's tense relationship. It is a moving film depicting the tension between Xianyang and his parents and also the marital relationship between his parents. The sunflower returns throughout the movie as a theme.

== Cast ==
- Sun Haiying as Zhang Gengnian, a Beijing painter whose spirit is crushed during his time in a labor camp during the Cultural Revolution.
- Joan Chen as Xiuqing, Zhang Gengnian's wife.
- Liu Zifeng as Lao Liu, Zhang Gengnian's best friend and fellow artist.
- Zhang Fan as Zhang Xiangyang, Zhang Gengnian's son as an 8-year-old boy.
- Gao Ge as Zhang Xiangyang as a 19-year-old man.
- Wang Haidi as Zhang Xiangyang as a 30-year-old man.
- Liang Jing as Han Jing, Xiangyang's wife.
- Hong Yihao as Chicken Droppings, Xiangyang's friend as a 9-year-old boy.
- Li Bin as Chicken Droppings as a 19-year-old young man.

== Releases ==
Sunflower received its international premiere at the 2005 Toronto International Film Festival on September 10, 2005.

The film was also shown at several international film festivals.

- 2005 Toronto International Film Festival – Contemporary World Cinema September 10, 2005
- 2005 Chicago International Film Festival, October 10, 2005
- 2005 San Sebastian Film Festival
- 2005 Pusan International Film Festival – Window on Asian Cinema
- 2006 Hong Kong International Film Festival, April 11, 2006
- 2006 Bangkok International Film Festival, – Windows on the World, February 19, 2006
- 2006 Tokyo International Film Festival, July 8, 2006
- 2007 Pacific Rim Film Festival, October 10, 2007

Sunflower was also given a limited release in New York City on August 17, 2007. Playing on only one screen, the film has made less than $24,000 in the US as contrasted to over $8 million from foreign releases.

== Reception ==
Sunflower was shown at several international film festivals. It ultimately won the Silver Shell for Best Director and the Jury Award for Best Photography at the San Sebastián International Film Festival in 2006.

Review aggregator Rotten Tomatoes gives the film a 69% approval rating based on 13 reviews, with an average rating of 6.1/10. According to Metacritic, which sampled four critics and calculated a weighted average score of 64 out of 100, the film received "generally favorable reviews".
