= Toronto Film Critics Association Award for Outstanding Supporting Performance in a Canadian Film =

- Awarded for: Outstanding performance by an actor or an actress in a Canadian film
- Country: Canada
- Presented by: Toronto Film Critics Association
- Website: torontofilmcritics.com

The Toronto Film Critics Association Award for Outstanding Supporting Performance in a Canadian Film is one of the annual awards given by the Toronto Film Critics Association. It was presented for the first time in 2025, alongside a new award for Outstanding Lead Performance in a Canadian Film.

Prior to 2025, a single award for Outstanding Performance in a Canadian Film was presented, inclusive of both lead and supporting performances.

== Winners and runners-up ==
=== 2020s ===
Year	Winner	Film	Role	Ref.
2025	Elle-Máijá Tailfeathers	Sweet Angel Baby	Toni	
2025	Charlotte Aubin	Montreal, My Beautiful	Camille	
2025	Troy Kotsur	In Cold Light	Will	
