= The Shrouds =

2024 film by David Cronenberg

- Canadian theatrical release poster
- Directed by: David Cronenberg
- Written by: David Cronenberg
- Produced by: Saïd Ben Saïd; Martin Katz; Anthony Vaccarello
- Starring: Vincent Cassel; Diane Kruger; Guy Pearce; Sandrine Holt
- Cinematography: Douglas Koch
- Edited by: Christopher Donaldson
- Music by: Howard Shore
- Production companies: Telefilm Canada; Prospero Pictures; SBS International; Saint Laurent Productions
- Distributed by: Pyramide Distribution (France); Sphere Films (Canada)
- Release dates: May 20, 2024 (Cannes); April 25, 2025 (Canada); April 30, 2025 (France)
- Running time: 120 minutes
- Countries: France; Canada
- Language: English
- Budget: €13.9 million
- Box office: $1.5 million

The Shrouds (French: Les Linceuls) is a 2024 body horror drama film written and directed by David Cronenberg, and starring Diane Kruger, Vincent Cassel, Guy Pearce, and Sandrine Holt. The film is a co-production between Canada and France. Cronenberg has said that the film was made in response to the death of his wife of 43 years, Carolyn Zeifman, from cancer.

The Shrouds had its world premiere in the Main Competition section of the 2024 Cannes Film Festival on May 20, 2024. The film was released theatrically in France by Pyramide Distribution on April 30, 2025.

== Plot ==
Four years after his wife Becca's death from cancer, businessman Karsh has invented "GraveTech", a tombstone that broadcasts a live, interactive 3D image of the deceased's decomposing corpse. The image is created by a modified shroud, and Karsh plans to be buried with Becca when he dies. Though unable to find new love, he maintains a close friendship with Becca's identical sister, Terry. He dreams of Becca returning from the man who treated her, her lover, Dr. Jerry Eckler, each time increasingly weak and dismembered.

Several tombstones in the GraveTech cemetery including Becca's are destroyed, and the technology's network is encrypted by hackers, leaving the shrouds unviewable. Terry's ex-husband, Maury, who coded GraveTech's security and created a virtual assistant in Becca's image for Karsh named Hunny, determines the hack originated in Iceland, one of the countries where Karsh plans to expand his business. Viewing screenshots of Becca's corpse, Maury notices strange protrusions on the bones that Karsh believes were caused by her cancer. At the same time, Karsh is accosted by Soo-Min, the blind wife of a CEO who wants to sponsor a GraveTech in Budapest. He begins sleeping with her.

Karsh's relationship with Terry turns sexual, with Terry aroused by Karsh's description of sex with Soo-Min and his growing fascination with the conspiracy around GraveTech. As Karsh learns that the hack did not come from Iceland, Maury notices that the destroyed tombstones had their data lines bugged. Soo-Min warns Karsh that Hunny's code was found to be unstable, and the AI takes on Becca's naked, dismembered form as it taunts Karsh about his supposed sexual inferiority to Eckler. Terry shows him a video she covertly took of Maury, whose jealousy of Karsh's relationship with her has caused his schizophrenia to resurface. In the video, he claims to be in full control of Hunny and implies that he was in some way behind the attack on GraveTech.

After being called to talk, Karsh meets Maury in the woods, who shows him the bloody remains of his hand after losing two fingers. He claims that he hired a pair of Russian hackers to take over GraveTech's network, which convinced a group working under the CPC, investors in GraveTech who supposedly tapped the data lines, that he could be used as a mole. They tortured him for info on the Russian "operation". Terry later claims that he lost the fingers in high school and hides them from everyone. While GraveTech's network is brought back online and the tombstones are repaired, a doctor examining the protrusions on Becca's body informs Karsh that they are actually non-existent and merely computer-generated images.

Karsh is shocked to find Eckler's murdered body buried in his spot next to Becca. Terry theorizes about what could have happened to put Eckler there, and when Karsh pretends he hired a hitman to kill and bury Eckler, she becomes aroused. Believing that Becca now has someone to keep her company in death, Karsh willingly gives up his spot and goes with Soo-Min on a jet to Budapest. As they kiss, she suddenly appears to him with identical scars to Becca and, speaking in her voice, offers to be buried with him in Budapest, which he accepts.

== Cast ==
- Vincent Cassel as Karsh
- Diane Kruger as Becca / Terry / Hunny
- Guy Pearce as Maury
- Sandrine Holt as Soo-Min Szabo
- Elizabeth Saunders as Gray Foner
- Jennifer Dale as Myrna Slotnik
- Eric Weinthal as Dr. Hofstra
- Steve Switzman as Dr. Jerry Eckler
- Jeff Yung as Dr. Rory Zhao

== Production ==
The concept was first envisioned as a television series for Netflix, with Cronenberg writing two episodes before the plans were cancelled by Netflix. As a TV series, Cronenberg envisioned that each episode would be set in a different country, drawing on burial rituals from different cultures.

Saïd Ben Saïd and Martin Katz produced the film for Prospero Pictures and SBS International alongside co-producer Steve Solomos. The cinematographer Douglas Koch worked alongside art director Jason Clarke and production designer Carol Spier and costume designer Anne Dixon.

In an interview, Cronenberg described the film as very "personal" and "autobiographical". It is directly inspired by his own grief at the loss of his wife, Carolyn, who died in 2017.

=== Casting ===
The project was first announced in May 2022, with Vincent Cassel attached to play the lead role. In September 2022, Léa Seydoux joined the cast. In April 2023, Diane Kruger replaced Seydoux, and Guy Pearce joined the cast. That month, Sandrine Holt also joined the cast.

=== Filming ===
Principal photography began on May 8, 2023, in Toronto, Canada, and wrapped on June 19, 2023. The film was shot on ARRIRAW MXF files using an Arri Alexa 35. Media Composer was used to edit the film and colour correction was done by Bill Ferwerda using DaVinci Resolve.

== Release ==
The film was screened in Main Competition section at the 77th Cannes Film Festival on May 20, 2024. It also played at the Toronto International Film Festival on September 5, 2024.

Sphere Films theatrically released the film in Canada on April 25, 2025. The film was released theatrically in France by Pyramide Distribution on April 30, 2025, after reportedly being pushed back from a release in January 2025. Sideshow and Janus Films released the film in the United States. The Shrouds opened on April 18 in New York and Los Angeles, and expanded nationwide on April 25, 2025.

== Reception ==
=== Critical response ===
On the review aggregator website Rotten Tomatoes, 75% of 189 critics' reviews are positive, with an average rating of 6.8/10. The website's consensus reads: "Ruminating on the love within loss, The Shrouds is a personal and peculiar examination of grief by director David Cronenberg." Metacritic, which uses a weighted average, assigned the film a score of 72 out of 100, based on 37 critics, indicating "generally favorable" reviews. The film was named to TIFF's annual Canada's Top Ten list for 2024. In June 2025, IndieWire ranked the film at number 39 on its list of "The 100 Best Movies of the 2020s (So Far)."

Musician Charli XCX made it one of her four picks of favourite films in the Criterion Closet in 2026, saying “I kind of haven't been able to stop thinking about this film. I think about it every week. I feel like I discover a new feeling thinking about this film every week.”

=== Accolades ===
List of awards and nominations for The Shrouds
Award or film festival	Date of ceremony	Category	Recipient(s)	Result	Ref.
Cannes Film Festival	May 25, 2024	Palme d'Or	David Cronenberg	Nominated	
Toronto Film Critics Association	2025	Rogers Best Canadian Film	David Cronenberg	Nominated	
Toronto Film Critics Association	2025	Outstanding Lead Performance in a Canadian Film	Vincent Cassel	Won	

== Works cited ==
- Macaulay, Scott (2025). "Conspiracy of the Dead". Filmmaker. Vol. 33, no. 3. The Gotham Film & Media Institute.
