= Toronto Film Critics Association Awards 2025 =

Annual Canadian film awards ceremony

29th Toronto Film Critics Association
- Date: March 2, 2026
- Site: The Omni King Edward Hotel
- Hosted by: Tamara Podemski

Highlights
- Best Picture: One Battle After Another
- Most awards: One Battle After Another (4)

The 29th Toronto Film Critics Association Awards, honouring the best films released in 2025, were announced on December 7, 2025.

The awards were formally presented, alongside the announcement of the winners of the Rogers Best Canadian Film Award (for Canadian narrative and documentary films) and the organization's special awards, at the organization's annual gala, hosted by Canadian actress Tamara Podemski for the second year in a row, at The Omni King Edward Hotel in Toronto, on March 2, 2026.

== Controversy ==
Two days following the ceremony, Elle-Máijá Tailfeathers returned her award for Outstanding Supporting Performance in a Canadian Film after learning that her pre-taped acceptance speech had been edited at the ceremony, purportedly for length but alleged by Tailfeathers to have been for political reasons as the end of her speech contained supportive remarks about the Palestinian people.

Unable to attend the ceremony in person, Tailfeathers' video message included the statement "my heart continues to be with the people of Palestine who are experiencing th[e] ongoing genocide and thank you to anyone in this industry who's been brave enough to say anything". Tailfeathers said that she was "disgusted and ashamed" by the Toronto Film Critics Association's decision to cut that portion of her speech. In what was described as a "furious" email sent to TFCA members, Tailfeathers condemned the organization for censorship and vowed to return her award, writing, "A choice was made to neutralize and censor my words with the paternalistic excuse that I somehow needed protection from my own words." Tailfeathers added that she was not interested in receiving an apology, writing, "I do not know how this rupture can be repaired. The moral injury I carry with me cannot be undone."

In response to her letter, Toronto Film Critics Association president Johanna Schneller said that Tailfeathers' speech had only been edited "to maintain the timing of the awards show" and not for political reasons, and that the decision was hers as president, but would nevertheless resign as the organization's president, writing, "In light of this outcome, I will be tendering my resignation." Furthermore, The Hollywood Reporter learned that another three active members of forty-six had resigned following Schneller's resignation.

On March 9, the Toronto Film Critics Association apologized to Tailfeathers in a statement issued to the CBC News website. "We sincerely apologize to Elle-Máijá Tailfeathers for the fact that her message was not aired in full and that she was neither given an opportunity to review the edits to her acceptance speech, nor were time constraints communicated to her," the TFCA stated.

The organization also promised that all future award winners will "receive an opportunity to review and approve pre-recorded speeches before they run, and that any time constraints or concerns must be expressly communicated to them throughout the process." The TFCA further apologized to its members "who were both personally and professionally offended by these events," adding in its statement that it will "welcome the return of any members and look forward to inviting new perspectives into the group, as we do annually, to better represent the Toronto film scene".

== Winners ==
Winners are listed first and in bold, followed by the runners-up.

Best Picture	Best Director
**One Battle After Another**; Hamnet; Sinners	**Paul Thomas Anderson – One Battle After Another**; Ryan Coogler – Sinners; Oliver Laxe – Sirāt
Outstanding Lead Performance	Outstanding Supporting Performance
**Rose Byrne – If I Had Legs I'd Kick You as Linda**; **Ethan Hawke – Blue Moon as Lorenz Hart**; Jessie Buckley – Hamnet as Agnes Shakespeare; Leonardo DiCaprio – One Battle After Another as Bob Ferguson; Michael B. Jordan – Sinners as Elijah "Smoke" Moore / Elias "Stack" Moore; Wagner Moura – The Secret Agent as Armando Solimões / Marcelo Alves / Fernando Solimões	**Benicio del Toro – One Battle After Another as Sensei Sergio St. Carlos**; **Nina Hoss – Hedda as Eileen Lovborg**; Jacob Elordi – Frankenstein as The Creature; Amy Madigan – Weapons as Gladys; Sean Penn – One Battle After Another as Col. Steven J. Lockjaw; Stellan Skarsgård – Sentimental Value as Gustav Borg
Outstanding Lead Performance in a Canadian Film	Outstanding Supporting Performance in a Canadian Film
**Joan Chen – Montreal, My Beautiful (Montréal, ma belle) as Feng Xia**; Deragh Campbell – Measures for a Funeral as Audrey Benac; Vincent Cassel – The Shrouds as Karsh	**Elle-Máijá Tailfeathers – Sweet Angel Baby as Toni (declined)**; Charlotte Aubin – Montreal, My Beautiful (Montréal, ma belle) as Camille; Troy Kotsur – In Cold Light as Will
Best Original Screenplay	Best Adapted Screenplay
**Ryan Coogler – Sinners**; Ronald Bronstein and Josh Safdie – Marty Supreme; Joachim Trier and Eskil Vogt – Sentimental Value	**Paul Thomas Anderson – One Battle After Another**; Chloé Zhao and Maggie O'Farrell – Hamnet; Park Chan-wook, Lee Kyoung-mi, Don McKellar, and Lee Ja-hye – No Other Choice
Best Animated Feature	Best International Feature
**Endless Cookie**; KPop Demon Hunters; Space Cadet	**Sirāt**; It Was Just an Accident; The Secret Agent
Best First Feature	Outstanding Breakthrough Performance
**Blue Heron**; Eephus; Sorry, Baby	**Abou Sangaré – Souleymane's Story**; Miles Caton – Sinners; Chase Infiniti – One Battle After Another
Rogers Best Canadian Film	Rogers Best Canadian Documentary
**Blue Heron**; Nirvanna the Band the Show the Movie; The Shrouds	**Endless Cookie**; Ghosts of the Sea (Les enfants du large); Who Killed the Montreal Expos? (Qui a tué les Expos de Montréal?)
Allan King Documentary Award
**Come See Me in the Good Light**; Orwell: 2+2=5; The Tale of Silyan

== Special awards ==
- Company 3 Luminary Award – Ron Mann
- Company 3 Luminary "Pay It Forward" Grant – Jacquelyn Mills
- Telefilm Canada Emerging Critic Award – Nirris Nagendrarajah
- Stella Artois Jay Scott Prize for Best Emerging Artist – Xiaodan He
