= Charlotte Aubin =

Canadian actress from Quebec

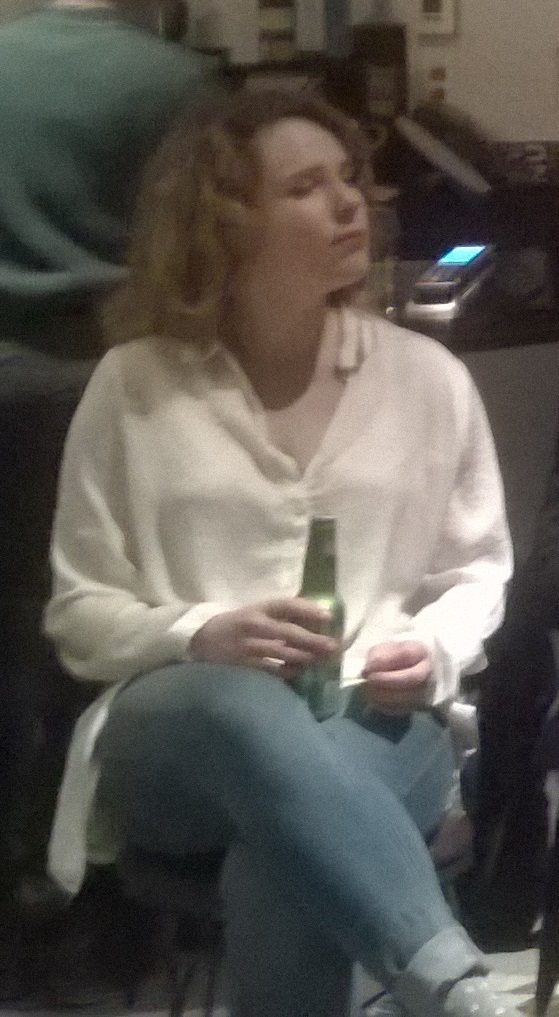
Aubin in 2019

Charlotte Aubin (born September 4, 1991 in Montreal, Quebec) is a Canadian actress from Quebec. She is most noted for her performance in the film Isla Blanca, for which she received a Prix Iris nomination for Best Actress at the 20th Quebec Cinema Awards in 2018.

She has also appeared in the films Romeo and Juliet, 9 (9, le film), Crème de menthe, Those Who Make Revolution Halfway Only Dig Their Own Graves (Ceux qui font les révolutions à moitié n'ont fait que se creuser un tombeau), Les Salopes, or the Naturally Wanton Pleasure of Skin, This Is Our Cup (Ça sent la coupe), Mad Dog Labine, Beautiful and Neat Room, Goodbye Happiness (Au revoir le bonheur), Heirdoms (Soumissions), Red Rooms (Les chambres rouges), Ireland Blue Book (Irlande cahier bleu), Testament, Cardboard City (Ville Jacques-Carton) and Montreal, My Beautiful (Montréal, ma belle), and the television series Providence, Blue Moon, L'Échappée, Fugueuse and Virage.

Originally from Carignan, Quebec, she is a graduate of the National Theatre School of Canada. She has published a poetry collection, Paquet d'trouble.

== Awards and nominations ==
Year	Award	Category	Work	Result	Ref
2018	Prix Iris (Le Gala Québec Cinéma)	Best Actress	Isla Blanca	Nominated	
2025	Toronto Film Critics Association Awards	Outstanding Supporting Performance in a Canadian Film	Montreal, My Beautiful (Montréal, ma belle)	Nominated	
