= Maria Petschnig =

Austrian artist

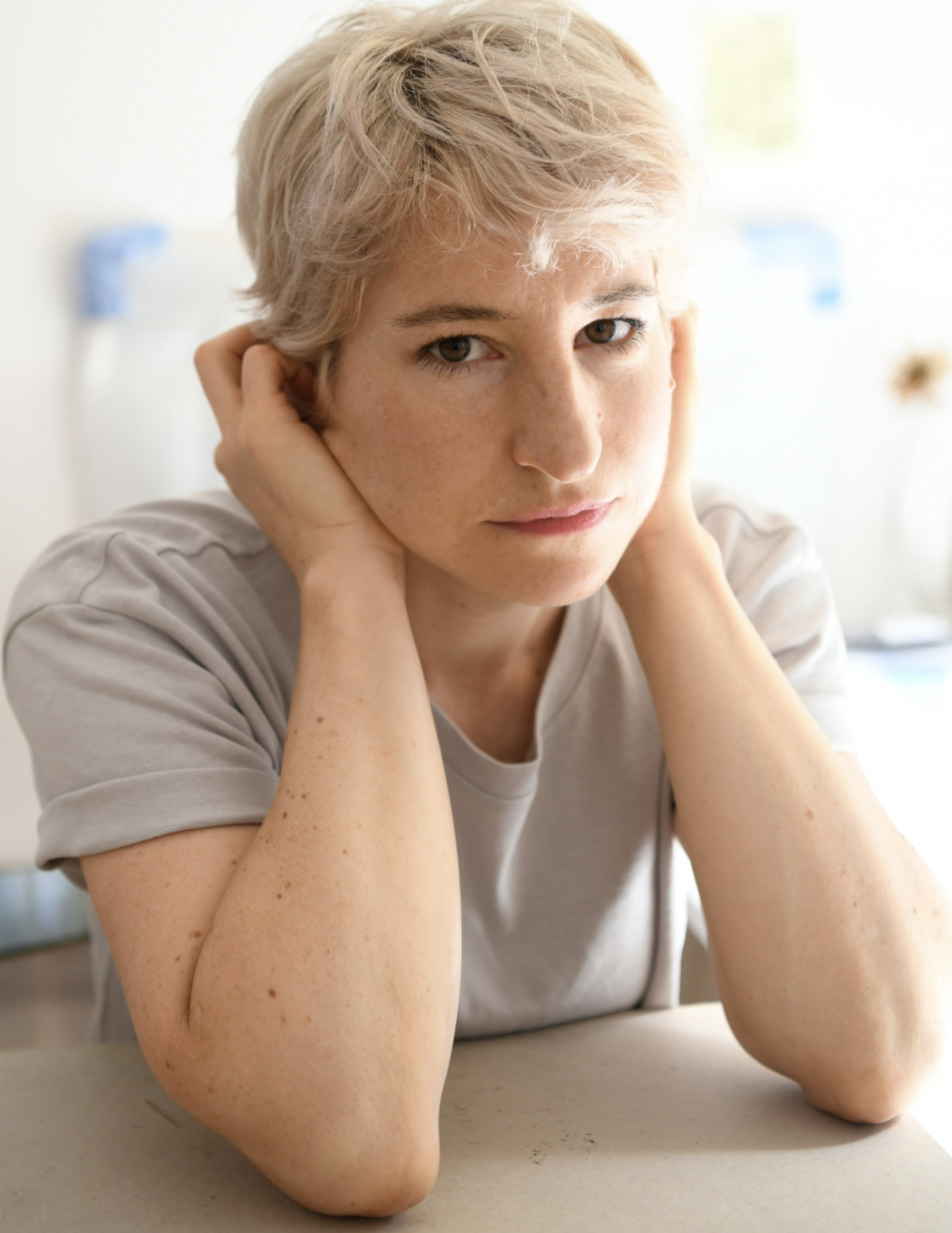
- Maria Petschnig in 2021.
- Born: 1977 (age 48–49); Klagenfurt, Austria
- Education: Academy of Fine Arts Vienna; Royal College of Art; Wimbledon College of Arts
- Notable work: Vasistas (2013); Petschsniggle (2013)
- Website: Official website

Maria Petschnig (born 1977) is an Austrian artist and filmmaker. Her works include a variety of media including video art. Her artistic works frequently deal with memory and voyeurism. Her works have been shown at numerous exhibitions in Europe and the United States including at the Museum of Modern Art in New York City. Petschnig's works have received critical reviews from The New York Times, Artforum and Art in America.

== Biography ==
=== Early life ===
Petschnig was born in 1977 in Klagenfurt, Austria. She studied painting at the Academy of Fine Arts Vienna, the Royal College of Art, London and at the Wimbledon School of Art, London. After spending some years in Paris and London, Petschnig moved to New York City in 2003.

=== Art ===
Petschnig started her professional career in the year 2000. In her earlier videos, she frequently made use of her own body in outlandish, psychological and awkward scenarios. Through her artworks, Petschnig raises social, psychological and existential issues while complicating the viewing experience. She makes her audience aware and often uncomfortable about their voyeuristic inclinations.

Karen Rosenberg of The New York Times argued that Petschnig's work can seem like a gentler version of Viennese Actionism's extreme body art or of the gender-bending epics of Matthew Barney. The art critic, Jerry Saltz, reviewed her work in the New York Magazine and wrote that her strange videos depict that she is the Franz Kafka of the art world.

In 2010, Petschnig's works were included in the Greater New York exhibition at the MoMA PS1 of the Museum of Modern Art in New York City. In 2013, her artworks Petschsniggle and Vasistas were exhibited nationally as well as internationally. Both of her artworks received critical reviews from multiple reputed news agencies including ARTnews and The New York Times. In 2015, Black Dog Publishing printed a monograph on Petschnig's videos titled Nineteen Videos 2002 - 2015.

In 2021, Petschnig produced her first documentary film, Uncomfortably Comfortable. The film chronicles the life of a homeless person, Marc, who lives in his car in New York City. The film premiered at the 45th Duisburger Filmwoche, where it received the ARTE-Dokumentarfilmpreis (ARTE Documentary Award) for the year 2021. Phuong Le in The Guardian called it a "commendably transparent" documentary.

Her first feature narrative film Beautiful and Neat Room screened in competition at the 30th STFF Split Film Festival in Croatia in September 2025, and won the Grand Prix for best feature.

Petschnig's artworks and films have been featured in multiple exhibitions and film festivals including the International Film Festival Rotterdam and Anthology Film Archives. She has also given talks on her work at Columbia University, Vassar College, The Institute of Contemporary Art (ICA), Moscow, National Centre for Contemporary Arts, Yekaterinburg and The New School.

=== Recognition ===
Besides having received the Competition Features GRAND PRIX 2025 and the ARTE-Dokumentarfilmpreis, Petschnig is a recipient of the Foundation for Contemporary Arts grant and the Rema Hort Mann Foundation Grant, New York. She has also received a national grant from the Federal Ministry for Arts, Culture, the Civil Service and Sport of the Government of Austria.

== Filmography ==
Year	Title	Length
2002	saucy slips & kinky curves	3 min
2003	peep	7 min
2006	Scopophilic	3 min
2007	KIP MASKER	3 min
2007	MINNIE	6 min
2008	Pareidolia	4 min
2008	Holodeck	2 min
2009	Born to Perform	20 min
2010	Episoden & Windows	17 min
2010	De Niña A Mujer	11 min
2011	An Evening at Home	7 min
2011	Commercial Break	1 min
2011	Coaching Sessions	4 min
2012	Unwind at the Lost & Find	3 min
2013	Vasistas	5 min
2013	Petschsniggle	7 min
2013	steppin' out for lunch	6 min
2014	C.	28 min
2017	0000.0078-I	2 min
2017	Poké, garden	22 min
2019	THE FEEDBACK	7 min
2019	AXxoN N.	3 min
2020	2042__Weniger_Zu_wenig	14 min
2020	Happy Birthday Anthology Film Archives!	2 min
2021	Uncomfortably Comfortable	72 min
2025	Beautiful and Neat Room	118 min

- Source
