= Singapore Sun Festival =

The Singapore Sun Festival is an annual music and life-style festival that runs over ten days and takes place in multiple venues across Singapore. The festival encompasses music, visual art, wine, cuisine, film, literature and wellness

== History ==
Founded in 2007, it follows in the footsteps of the Tuscan Sun Festival, founded in 2003 by Barrett Wissman, cellist Nina Kotova and writer Frances Mayes. In the years since its foundation, it has featured performers from around the world, including Joan Chen, Geoffrey Rush, Elvis Costello, Al Jarreau, Deepak Chopra and more.
