= Xiaodan He =

Chinese-Canadian film director (born 1975)

Xiaodan He (born 2 February 1975) is a Chinese-Canadian filmmaker. Many of her films concern aspects of Chinese culture and the experiences of immigrants.

== Filmmaking career ==
She is the first Chinese-born Canadian immigrant to receive financial grants from Quebec to make a feature film.

The first release of her career is La danse de l'étoile, which discusses aspects of ancient Dongba culture within modern China.

In 2005, she released her first short film, Cairo Calling, about the life of immigrants. The film was screened at over 50 festivals in numerous locations globally and received two audience awards.

In 2009, she released the documentary The Fall of Womenland, concerning sexual customs within Mosuo culture.

In 2013, she founded Red Dawn Productions, a film production company. Her debut feature fiction film A Touch of Spring (Un printemps d'ailleurs) was released by Red Dawn Productions in 2017. The film premiered at the 2017 Cinéfest Sudbury International Film Festival, and was screened at other film festivals including the 2017 Festival du nouveau cinéma and the Asian American International Film Festival, prior to going into commercial release in 2018; it debuted in theaters in August 2018.

In 2020, she released the short documentary film My Father's Journey (Mon père et sa mélancolie).

Her second feature film, Montreal, My Beautiful (Montréal, ma belle), premiered at the 2025 Festival du nouveau cinéma. The film is about a middle-aged lesbian Chinese immigrant in Montréal. She had begun writing the screenplay years prior.

In January 2026, the Toronto Film Critics Association named her the winner of its annual Jay Scott Prize for emerging Canadian filmmakers.

=== Acting career ===
She has also had occasional small roles in film and television as an actress, including in Those Who Make Revolution Halfway Only Dig Their Own Graves (Ceux qui font les révolutions à moitié n'ont fait que se creuser un tombeau), Family First (Chien de garde), Ru, and The Last Meal (Le Dernier repas).

== Personal life ==
She was born and raised in China, specifically Dazu District in Sichuan Province. Her father is of Nakhi descent, an ethnic minority in Yunnan, and she credits his minority status and the vulnerability, marginalization, and oppression it entails as being inspirational to the stories she tells in her films.

She began studying at the Beijing Film Academy in 1993, graduated in 1997, and moved to Montreal, Quebec, in 2002. As of February 2026, she was still based in Montreal. She returned to China to film several of her movies; Montreal, My Beautiful was the first she filmed in Montréal.

She is multilingual.
