= Our Own (2020 film) =

2020 film

- Film poster
- French: Les nôtres
- Directed by: Jeanne Leblanc
- Written by: Jeanne Leblanc; Judith Baribeau
- Produced by: Benoit Beaulieu; Marianne Farley
- Starring: Émilie Bierre; Marianne Farley; Paul Doucet; Judith Baribeau
- Cinematography: Tobie Marier Robitaille
- Edited by: Aube Foglia
- Production companies: SLYKID & SKYKID
- Distributed by: Maison 4:3
- Release date: February 26, 2020 (RVQC)
- Running time: 86 minutes
- Country: Canada
- Language: French

Our Own (French: Les nôtres) is a Canadian drama film, directed by Jeanne Leblanc and released in 2020. The film stars Émilie Bierre as Magalie Jodoin, a teenage girl in the small town of Sainte-Adeline, Quebec who sets off a local scandal when she gets pregnant.

The film's cast also includes Marianne Farley as Magalie's mother Isabelle, Paul Doucet as the town's mayor Jean-Marc Ricard and Judith Baribeau as Jean-Marc's wife Chantal Grégoire.

The film premiered on February 26, 2020 at the Rendez-vous Québec Cinéma.

== Reception ==
On the review aggregator website Rotten Tomatoes, 90% of 41 critics' reviews are positive, with an average rating of 7.00/10. The website's consensus reads: "Les Nôtres deftly hits expected beats to tell a story of betrayal whose finely calibrated direction and performances make it all the more harrowing."
