= Split Film Festival =

Coordinates: 43°30′N 16°26′E

- Location: Split, Croatia
- Founded: 1996; 29 years ago
- Founded by: Branko Karabatić
- Language: International
- Website: https://splitfilmfestival.com

Split Film Festival or Split International Festival of New Film, is one of the oldest film and video festivals in Croatia that showcases new, creative, personal, radical works of all styles, themes, genres and lengths, whether film, or new media, preferably from outside the mainstream. The festival's previous guests include Chris Marker, Jonas Mekas, Jean Marie Straub & Daniele Huillot, late Stan Brakhage, Claire Denis, Bela Tarr, Lars von Trier and Cyrus Frisch.

The Festival presents screenings of selected films, videos, interactive media, installations, performances, retrospectives workshops, discussions and festival's catalogue and has featured work from director Amartya Bhattacharyya and filmmaker Maria Petschnig.

Split Film Festival takes place every Summer in Split, Croatia. The Festival is open to all new, innovative, personal, experimental film, radical, subversive etc. work (film, video and new media) of all genres and lengths, preferably from outside the mainstream, whether it was made on a shoestring budget or is a studio release, without emphasis on profits.
