= Shepherds (film) =

2024 Canadian drama film

- Film poster
- French: Berger
- Directed by: Sophie Deraspe
- Screenplay by: Sophie Deraspe; Mathyas Lefebure
- Based on: D'où viens tu, berger? by Mathyas Lefebure
- Produced by: Luc Déry; Kim McCraw; Élaine Hébert; Caroline Bonmarchand; Xenia Sulyma; Sébastien Perret
- Starring: Félix-Antoine Duval; Solène Rigot
- Cinematography: Vincent Gonneville
- Edited by: Stéphane Lafleur
- Music by: Philippe Brault
- Production companies: Avenue B Productions micro_scope
- Distributed by: Maison 4:3
- Release date: September 7, 2024 (TIFF)
- Running time: 113 minutes
- Countries: Canada; France
- Language: French

Shepherds (French: Bergers) is a 2024 Canadian-French drama film directed by Sophie Deraspe. An adaptation of Mathyas Lefebure's semi-autobiographical novel D'où viens tu, berger?, the film stars Félix-Antoine Duval as Mathyas, a burned-out advertising executive from Montreal who moves to Provence to become a shepherd.

The cast also includes Solène Rigot, Younes Boucif, Bruno Raffaelli, Véronique Ruggia, Michel Benizri, Guilaine Londez and David Ayala.

The film was screened for distributors at the 2024 Cannes Film Market, and premiered at the 2024 Toronto International Film Festival. It was commercially released in November 2024.

== Plot ==
Mathyas, an advertising writer from Montréal, suddenly leaves Canada for Provence, France, after becoming unhappy with his former life. He decides to become a shepherd despite having no experience and little money. Local farmers initially mock his romantic ideas about rural life, and his first trial ends when the farmer decides he is too inexperienced to train. Mathyas also discovers that he cannot legally work in France because he did not obtain a work permit before leaving Canada. He nevertheless finds work with Gérard Tellier, a struggling sheep farmer, and Ahmed, an experienced Moroccan shepherd who teaches him how to handle sheep, recognize illness, manage grazing, and control a flock. Mathyas soon discovers that shepherding involves exhausting work, injured and sick animals, drought, financial problems, and difficult working conditions rather than the simple life he imagined.

Mathyas begins corresponding with Élise, a civil servant he met while trying to obtain a work permit. Inspired by his letters, Élise quits her job and visits him, but finds that Mathyas has made his new life sound more romantic than it really is. After Gérard becomes increasingly unstable, Mathyas and Élise leave the farm together. They meet sheep farmer Cécile Espriroux, who hires them to take about 800 sheep to summer pasture in the Alps. With the sheepdog Hola, they learn to manage the flock during the long seasonal journey to the mountains. Once there, Mathyas and Élise become a couple and settle into the demanding routine of mountain shepherding. Their lives become centered on the sheep, the landscape, and each other, and Élise decides that she no longer wants to return to her former office life.

Later, Mathyas briefly leaves the mountain to join a farmers' protest. After he returns, he and Élise discover that wolves have attacked the flock, killing or badly injuring about thirty sheep and scattering others. They recover the surviving animals and report the losses, but Cécile blames them for failing to protect her flock and fires them, saying that a shepherd should never lose a sheep. Although another shepherd tells them that they cared well for the animals and gives them supplies for their journey, Mathyas and Élise do not return to their former lives. Together, Élise, Mathyas and Hola continue to herd sheep.

== Cast ==
- Félix-Antoine Duval as Mathyas
- Solène Rigot

== Reception ==
Pat Mullen of That Shelf wrote: "This sumptuous drama by Sophie Deraspe (Antigone) follows [the] pursuit of being a farmhand. Shepherds adapts Lefebure’s memoir D-où viens-tu, berger? and might thrill audiences with its notion of connecting with a traditional way of life while leaving them equally daunted by the realities of it. This is a touching, soul-stirring film that rejuvenates a viewer like a crisp flick of fresh air."

The film was named to TIFF's annual Canada's Top Ten list for 2024.

== Awards ==
Award	Date of ceremony	Category	Recipient(s)	Result	Ref(s)
Toronto International Film Festival	2024	Best Canadian Film	Sophie Deraspe	Won	
Toronto Film Critics Association	2024	Rogers Best Canadian Film Award	Sophie Deraspe	Nominated	
Canadian Screen Awards	2025	Best Adapted Screenplay	Sophie Deraspe, Mathyas Lefebure	Nominated	
Canadian Screen Awards	2025	Best Cinematography	Vincent Gonneville	Nominated	
Quebec Cinema Awards	2025	Best Film	Luc Déry, Kim McCraw, Élaine Hébert, Caroline Bonmarchand, Xenia Sulyma	Nominated	
Quebec Cinema Awards	2025	Best Director	Sophie Deraspe	Nominated	
Quebec Cinema Awards	2025	Best Actor	Félix-Antoine Duval	Nominated	
Quebec Cinema Awards	2025	Best Screenplay	Sophie Deraspe, Mathyas Lefebure	Nominated	
Quebec Cinema Awards	2025	Best Art Direction	André-Line Beauparlant	Nominated	
Quebec Cinema Awards	2025	Best Cinematography	Vincent Gonneville	Won	
Quebec Cinema Awards	2025	Best Editing	Stéphane Lafleur	Won	
Quebec Cinema Awards	2025	Best Original Music	Philippe Brault	Won	
Quebec Cinema Awards	2025	Best Sound	Olivier Calvert, Stephen De Oliveira, Hans Laitres	Won	
Quebec Cinema Awards	2025	Best Visual Effects	Jean-François « Jafaz » Ferland, Marie-Claude Lafontaine, Marc Morissette	Nominated	
Quebec Cinema Awards	2025	Best Casting	Adélaïde Mauvernay, Nathalie Boutrie	Nominated	
Quebec Cinema Awards	2025	Most Successful Film Outside Quebec	Luc Déry, Kim McCraw, Élaine Hébert, Caroline Bonmarchand, Xenia Sulyma	Nominated	
Quebec Cinema Awards	2025	Prix Michel-Côté	Luc Déry, Kim McCraw, Élaine Hébert, Caroline Bonmarchand, Xenia Sulyma, Chantal Pagé, Sophie Deraspe, Mathyas Lefebure	Nominated	
