= I Love You, China =

Chinese patriotic song

"I Love You, China" (Chinese: 我愛你，中國; pinyin: Wǒ ài nǐ, Zhōngguó) is a song from the 1979 film A Loyal Overseas Chinese Family (海外赤子), also called Hearts for the Motherland. It was composed for a soprano by Zheng Qiufeng with lyrics by Qu Cong, and is structured like an opera aria. The lyrics depict the natural scenic beauty of China.

In the film, the heroine played by Joan Chen sings "I Love You, China", during an entrance examination for a music conservatory. Chen's singing voice was dubbed by a classically trained singer. The singer was Ye Peiying.

In subsequent decades, the song has become popular as a standalone song. Demanding the voice of a masterful soprano, it has been sung by many singers, but the version as rendered by Ye Peiying is considered the most beautiful.
