= Li Daimo =

- 李代沫
- Born: 9 May 1988 (age 38); Qiqihar, Heilongjiang, China
- Occupation: Singer
- Years active: 2012–Now
- Style: C-pop, Pop, Ballad
- Musical career
- Genres: Mandopop
- Instrument: Vocals

Li Daimo (Chinese: 李代沫; pinyin: Lǐ Daìmò; born 9 May 1988 in Qiqihar, Heilongjiang), also known as Demon Li, is a Chinese singer who rose to fame after being discovered during the first season of The Voice of China.

== Biography ==
=== The voice of China ===
Li learned clarinet and singing in his childhood, and attended Shenyang Conservatory of Music. He was overweight while a university student, but achieved a slim figure prior to his participation in The Voice of China through a strict diet.

In 2012, Li took part in the first season of The Voice of China, singing Wanting Qu's You Exist in My Song (我的歌声里), and was selected to join the team of mentor Liu Huan.

=== Music career ===
After competing on "The Voice of China", Li released 2 solo albums: "My Voice" (2012), and "Sensitive" (2013), both of which were well received among Chinese music fans.

In July 2013, while promoting his 3rd solo album "There is No 'Just Nice' in Love" (2013), Li came out as a gay man, and gained overwhelming support from netizens on China's popular microblogging site Sina Weibo.

On 17 March 2014, Li was arrested by Beijing police due to drug possession. On 27 May 2014, the court found Li guilty, and sentenced him to nine months in prison and a fine of 2,000 Yuan. He was released from prison in December 2014, after serving seven months, earlier than his original nine-month sentence, due to good behavior.

After his release from prison, Li resumed his music career and started working on new projects. In 2016, after two years of work, Li released his fourth studio album "Thank You" (2016), promoting it with performances on various television shows in China. Since then, he has continued composing new songs, while collaborating and performing with other artists.

In 2017, Li released his 5th studio album entitled "Come, I'm Here" (2017), under the label Dream Ring Entertainment, which included one song in English.

== Discography ==
=== Studio albums ===
- "My Voice" (2012)
- "Sensitive" (2013)
- "There is No 'Just Nice' in Love" (2013)
- "Thank You" (2016)
- "Come, I'm Here" (2017)
- "Don't forget It" (2019)
- "Incomplete story" (2020)

=== Singles ===
- Simple Things
- Codice
- In My Song
- Am I the One You Love the Most?
- Wound
- If You Aren't Here
- Regret
- In My Bones
- I Can't Get It
- I Loved That Face
