= Mathyas Lefebure =

Canadian writer

- Born: Mathieu Lefebvre
- Occupations: novelist, shepherd
- Writing career
- Period: 2000s-present
- Notable works: D'où viens tu, berger?

Mathyas Lefebure is the pen name of Mathieu Lefebvre, a Canadian writer from Quebec. He is best known for his debut novel D'où viens tu, berger?, a roman à clef about his own decision to abandon a career in marketing and public relations to become a shepherd in Provence after going through an existential crisis.

He made the move to France in 2004, after deciding that he was unfulfilled in his existing career.

His second novel, Le Grand livre des fous, followed in 2010.

D'où viens tu, berger? was selected for the 2007 edition of Le Combat des livres, where it was defended by sports journalist Robert Frosi. In 2023, it was announced that Sophie Deraspe was directing a film adaptation of the novel; Shepherds (Berger) premiered at the 2024 Toronto International Film Festival.
