= Gambling, Gods and LSD =

2002 documentary film by Peter Mettler

- 2002 film poster
- Directed by: Peter Mettler
- Written by: Peter Mettler
- Produced by: Ingrid Veninger; Alexandra Gill; Cornelia Seitler
- Starring: John Paul Young; Albert Hofmann
- Cinematography: Peter Mettler
- Edited by: Peter Mettler; Roland Schlimme
- Music by: Peter Bräker; Fred Frith; Henryk Górecki; Jim O'Rourke
- Production companies: Grimthorpe Film; Maximage
- Distributed by: Odeon Films (Canada); Columbus Film AG (Switzerland)
- Release date: April 2002
- Running time: 180 minutes
- Countries: Canada; Switzerland
- Languages: English; Swiss-German (English subtitles)

Gambling, Gods and LSD is a 2002 Canadian/Swiss experimental documentary film by Canadian film director Peter Mettler. It was shot between 1997 and 1999 in Canada, the United States, Switzerland and India, and is a "fragmented narrative" that shows what people do to discover themselves and find happiness.

The film was screened at film festivals in a number of countries across the world, including Canada, Switzerland, the United States, Germany, Italy, the Netherlands, Japan, Australia and South Africa. It won several awards, including the Academy of Canadian Cinema & Television's 2003 Genie Award for "Best Documentary".

== Synopsis ==
Gambling, Gods and LSD is a "travel diary" that loosely documents director Peter Mettler's "introspective journey" through four countries: Canada, the United States, Switzerland and India. The film consists of four segments, each showing what people do to discover themselves and find happiness.

The first segment takes place in Mettler's hometown of Toronto where he interviews John Paul Young about finding God. Mettler also visits the Toronto Airport Christian Fellowship Church who chant, dance and roll on the floor of an airport hangar where they believe Jesus once visited. In the next segment petroglyphs and snakes are observed in Monument Valley in Southwestern United States, and time is spent in Las Vegas, where gamblers are scrutinized at their slot machines and poker tables. Here Mettler also interviews a sex toy salesman who promises clients a "non-chemical induced illusion of their fantasy" with his orgasmatron (sex chair) and other devices.

In the third segment, Mettler interviews the Swiss scientist who discovered LSD, Albert Hofmann, who, according to a later recounting of the meeting by Mettler, "felt Timothy Leary was both overly flamboyant and overly simplified, and the resultant publicity made further medical research impossible." Hofmann also explains his theory of "horizontal genetics" which suggests that human individuality does not exist. In Zürich Mettler interviews a couple addicted to heroin, visits "poodle racers" and a techno rave. The last segment is filmed in Bombay (now Mumbai), and in Hampi, former capital of the ancient Vijayanagara Empire in Southern India. The scenes here include following a pilgrimage ceremony that culminates in darśana ("looking at a deity"), and a visit to the Bombay Laughing Club where members find solace in laughing and making faces at one another.

== Background ==
Mettler came to prominence in 1982 when the Toronto Festival of Festivals screened his first full-length film, Scissere. He started contemplating Gambling, Gods and LSD in 1988, but it was only after he finished Picture of Light in 1994 that he started working on the project full-time. Filming began in late 1997 and finished in early 1999. Mettler usually travelled on his own, doing all the interviewing, camera work and directing himself, with the occasional help of locals in some of the cities. He spent close to two years on the road, and said that no retakes were done and no multi-camera setups were used. The film was unscripted—Mettler said, "[it] was making itself while I acted as a medium".

Mettler approached Gambling, Gods and LSD with four themes in mind: "transcendence, the denial of death, our relationship to nature and the illusion of safety". He investigated the fringe cultures of Toronto, Las Vegas, Zurich and Southern India, and said the film is about finding what people's addictions are, what they do to escape reality and give meaning to their lives. Mettler said this endeavor turned out to be his own escape and addiction.

Mettler began editing the film in early 1999 outside Zurich with Roland Schlimme (Manufactured Landscapes, Act of God). More than 50 hours of film, and hundreds of hours of video were shot to produce the final three-hour cut, which he said was like "composing a piece of music". Fifty-two hours of assembled edit was unreleased, from which Mettler believes another film could be culled.

Gambling, Gods and LSD does not conform to any of the traditional documentary genres. Mettler said that the film "is in part about the breaking down of categories or prejudices ... It invites the viewer to go on a journey, to actively participate in the making of meaning and the opening of senses ... [and] make associations between what they see and their own personal experience". The title of the film came from a list of peak experiences, addictions and escapes he had been investigating. Mettler has cited Andrei Tarkovsky and Michelangelo Antonioni as film directors who have influenced him.

== Reception ==
Stephen Lan, writing in Take One: Film & Television in Canada, commended director Mettler's "three-hour epic" for making viewers "think for themselves". Lan described Gambling, Gods and LSD as a "visual and aural enigma" and said that it is "boldly unique" because of its elusiveness, prompting audiences to form their own interpretations and decide for themselves what the film is all about. He said that in spite of the film's "elliptical non-narrative structure" and "multiplicity of layers", it does not feel longer than most feature-length films, and "deserves ... several viewings, each bound to provide drastically new and different insights".

In a review of the film at Montreal's 2002 Festival du nouveau cinéma (where it won the "Best Documentary Award"), Donato Totaro said Gambling, Gods and LSD is a "fragmented narrative" and "a modern variant of the wonderful, old tradition of the city film". He compared the film to Man with a Movie Camera (1929, Dziga Vertov), Koyaanisqatsi (1982, Godfrey Reggio) and Baraka (1992, Ron Fricke).

In Exclaim!, Michelle Devereaux called the film a "heady, transfixing meditation on the idea of meditation and transcendence itself". While Time Out found the film "a little pretentious", it said it is "compelling, exhilarating, funny, imaginative and ... wise". Jamie Russell at BBC Online said the film is "agonisingly tedious viewing" and that it "mimics the mind-altering, flattened out monotony of an acid trip". He complained that the point of the film's "unrelated segments" are never explained, and felt that the nature shots separating these segments are "nothing but marking time for the sake of it".

=== Awards ===
- 2002 – "Best Documentary", Vancouver International Film Festival (Vancouver, British Columbia, Canada)
- 2002 – "Best Documentary Award", Festival du nouveau cinéma (Montreal, Quebec, Canada)
- 2002 – "Grand Prix", Nyon Visions du Réel (Nyon, Switzerland)
- 2002 – "Best German Language Documentary", Duisburg Film Week (Duisburg, Germany)
- 2003 – "Best Documentary", Genie Award (Academy of Canadian Cinema & Television, Toronto International Film Festival, Canada)

Source: Swiss Films

== Soundtrack ==
Gambling, Gods and LSD

Soundtrack album by Various artists
- Released: 2003
- Genres: Experimental; avant-garde jazz; free improvisation
- Length: 61:08
- Label: Maximage (Switzerland)
- Producer: Peter Mettler

A soundtrack of Gambling, Gods and LSD by various artists and produced by Peter Mettler was released on CD in 2003. The editing and remixing was done by Mettler and Peter Bräker.

Fred Frith's contributions to the album are extracts and remixes from "Gambling, Gods and LSD", a piece he composed and performed for Mettler; Frith released it on his 2004 solo album, Eye to Ear II. Frith had previously composed and performed the soundtrack for Mettler's 1989 film, The Top of His Head.

=== Track listing ===
Part 1
No.	Title	Artist	Length
1.	"The River"	Fred Frith, Peter Bräker	6:23
2.	"The Church"	Bräker	2:01
3.	"The Flight"	Knut & Silvy, Frith	2:29

Part 2
No.	Title	Artist	Length
1.	"Desert Rain"	Unknown	0:49
2.	"Las Vegas"	Third Eye Foundation, Jim O'Rourke, Bräker, Dimitri De Perrot	6:51
3.	"Eva"	Tony Coe	3:22
4.	"Implosion"	Koch-Schütz-Studer (with DJ M. Singe & DJ I-Sound), De Perrot, O'Rourke	2:07
5.	"Dust"	Knut & Silvy	2:53

Part 3
No.	Title	Artist	Length
1.	"Over There"	Henryk Górecki, Frith	3:30
2.	"Swiss Miniature"	Bräker, Frith	1:48
3.	"Splugen"	Fennesz	4:14
4.	"Waterclock"	Bräker, Fennesz	4:32
5.	"Life Goes Off"	O'Rourke	4:04

Part 4
No.	Title	Artist	Length
1.	"Zurich, Arattu"	Frith	6:51
2.	"Jet Set"	Bräker	4:12
3.	"Backwaters"	Frith	5:02

Source: Soundtrack liner notes.

== Cited works ==
- Hoolboom, Mike (May 2008). "Peter Mettler: Gambling, Gods and LSD". Practical Dreamers: Conversations With Movie Artists. Coach House Books. pp. 103–110. ISBN 978-1-55245-200-4.
