= Eastern Avenue (Toronto) =

Street in Toronto, Ontario, Canada

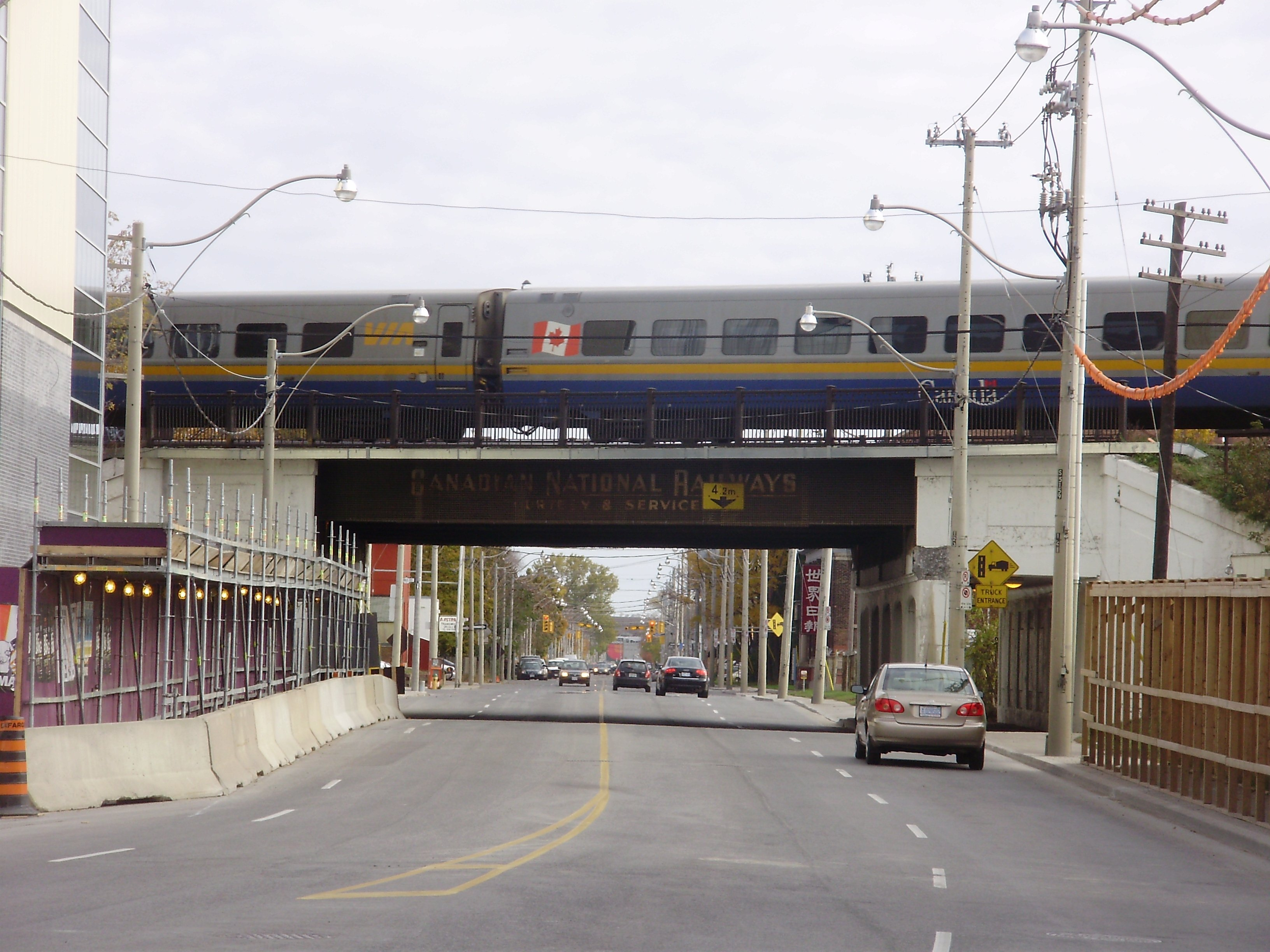
- A Via Rail train crosses over Eastern Avenue near its intersection with Broadview Avenue

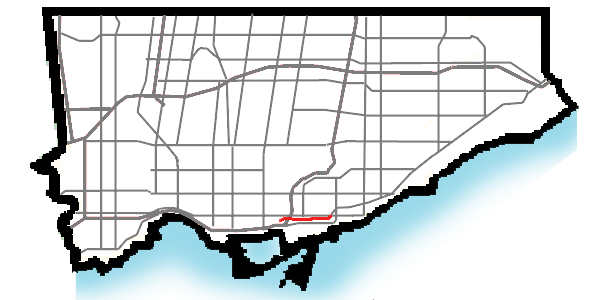
- Maintained by: City of Toronto
- Length: 4.5 km (2.8 mi)
- Location: Toronto
- West end: Front Street at Erin Street
- East end: Queen Street East continues as Kingston Road

Eastern Avenue is an east–west street in Toronto, Ontario, Canada. It runs from just east of Parliament Street in the downtown to just west of Coxwell Avenue, near the Beaches neighbourhood. Originally Eastern crossed the Don River at the Old Eastern Avenue Bridge, but that bridge was disconnected in 1964. Today, Eastern's east and west halves cross the Don River north of the old alignment via a large bridge with ramps connecting to the Don Valley Parkway, and this viaduct (known as the Eastern Avenue Bypass in some maps) forks out and becomes the eastern terminus of both Richmond and Adelaide streets.

Eastern runs through what was once the heart of Toronto's most industrial area, the region just north of Toronto Harbour and the Port Lands area. Today most of the factories have departed. Some do remain, notably the large Weston bakery. Several film studios have moved into the former industrial areas near Eastern and Carlaw, and this area is today billed as the Studio District. Eastern was also home to the headquarters of the Toronto chapter of the Hells Angels, until it was raided and confiscated by police in April 2007.

At its eastern terminus it now meets up at Kingston Road, once the main cross colonial route linking York to the other major Upper Canada settlement of Kingston.

Prior to 2000, however, Eastern Avenue did not meet up directly with Kingston Road, but at a point a few hundred feet west of the intersection of Kingston Road and Queen Street. Only with the demolition of Greenwood Racetrack was Eastern Avenue extended to flow directly into Kingston Road. The former terminus of Eastern Avenue still exists—it is the small unmarked (and unnamed) street that runs south off Queen Street between Coxwell and Orchard Park Avenues. A small isolated section of Eastern Avenue runs from Sumach Street to Lawren Harris Square.

Almost all the street scenes in the film Hairspray were filmed on Eastern Avenue.

== Public transit ==
The TTC proposed a 150 Eastern bus in 2022, which would operate along the length of the road.

A number of north–south buses use Eastern as the street they loop along before returning northwards. They include the 22 Coxwell, 31 Greenwood, and 72 Pape.

In 2008 bike lanes were added to Eastern, sparking controversy regarding practicality of bike lanes on arterial roads.

== Landmarks ==
Landmarks and notable sites along Eastern from west to east

Landmark	Cross street	Notes	Image
Inglenook Community High School	Cherry St	Historic school building	
Dominion Wheel & Foundries Limited	Rolling Mills Road	Abandoned site of a former rail parts manufacturer; includes four buildings of heritage significance	
Old Eastern Avenue Bridge	Don River	Abandoned bridge	
Sunlight Park	Don River	First baseball park in Toronto, demolished 1896	
Broadview Lofts	Broadview	Former warehouse converted into lofts	
Toronto Film Studios	Carlaw		
Weston Bakery	Carlaw	One of the remaining, operable factories	
Russell Carhouse	Greenwood	TTC streetcar yard	
South Central sorting plant	Greenwood	Main Canada Post facility for central Toronto	
Greenwood Raceway	Greenwood	Racetrack demolished in the 1990s	

== Cultural notes ==
Peter Mettler's 1985 documentary film Eastern Avenue derives its title from the fact that Mettler lived on Eastern Avenue at the time. Although the film as a whole was a video diary of Mettler's travels in Europe, it concludes with a shot of an Eastern Avenue street sign when Mettler returns home from his trip.
