= Vancouver Film Critics Circle Awards 2011 =

Annual Canadian film awards ceremony

The winners of the 12th Vancouver Film Critics Circle Awards, honoring the best in filmmaking in 2011, were announced on January 10, 2012.

== Winners and nominees ==
=== International ===
Category	Winners and nominees	Films
Best Film	Michel Hazanavicius	The Artist
Best Film	Alexander Payne	The Descendants
Best Film	Terrence Malick	The Tree of Life
Best Actor	Michael Fassbender	Shame
Best Actor	Jean Dujardin	The Artist
Best Actor	Michael Shannon	Take Shelter
Best Actress	Elizabeth Olsen	Martha Marcy May Marlene
Best Actress	Meryl Streep	The Iron Lady
Best Actress	Michelle Williams	My Week with Marilyn
Best Supporting Actor	Christopher Plummer	Beginners
Best Supporting Actor	Kenneth Branagh	My Week with Marilyn
Best Supporting Actor	Albert Brooks	Drive
Best Supporting Actress	Jessica Chastain	The Tree of Life, Take Shelter, and The Help
Best Supporting Actress	Melissa McCarthy	Bridesmaids
Best Supporting Actress	Shailene Woodley	The Descendants
Best Director	Terrence Malick	The Tree of Life
Best Director	Michel Hazanavicius	The Artist
Best Director	Martin Scorsese	Hugo
Best Screenplay	Michel Hazanavicius	The Artist
Best Screenplay	Woody Allen	Midnight in Paris
Best Screenplay	Alexander Payne, Nat Faxon, Jim Rash	The Descendants
Best Screenplay	Aaron Sorkin, Steven Zaillian	Moneyball
Best Documentary	Werner Herzog	Cave of Forgotten Dreams
Best Documentary	Patricio Guzmán	Nostalgia for the Light
Best Documentary	Steve James	The Interrupters
Best Documentary	James Marsh	Project Nim
Best Documentary	Mathieu Roy, Harold Crooks	Surviving Progress
Best Foreign Language Film	Asghar Farhadi	A Separation
Best Foreign Language Film	Lee Chang-dong	Poetry
Best Foreign Language Film	Jean-Pierre and Luc Dardenne	The Kid with a Bike

=== Canadian ===
Category	Winners and nominees	Films
Best Film	Jean-Marc Vallée	Café de Flore
Best Film	Ed Gass-Donnelly	Small Town Murder Songs
Best Film	Ken Scott	Starbuck
Best Actor	Peter Stormare	Small Town Murder Songs
Best Actor	Mohamed Fellag	Monsieur Lazhar
Best Actor	Patrick Huard	Starbuck
Best Actress	Michelle Williams	Take This Waltz
Best Actress	Keira Knightley	A Dangerous Method
Best Actress	Vanessa Paradis	Café de Flore
Best Actress	Ingrid Veninger	I Am a Good Person/I Am a Bad Person
Best Actress	Rachel Weisz	The Whistleblower
Best Supporting Actor	Viggo Mortensen	A Dangerous Method
Best Supporting Actor	Vincent Cassel	A Dangerous Method
Best Supporting Actor	Seth Rogen	Take This Waltz
Best Supporting Actress	Hélène Florent	Café de Flore
Best Supporting Actress	Jill Hennessy	Small Town Murder Songs
Best Supporting Actress	Hallie Switzer	I Am a Good Person/I Am a Bad Person
Best Director	David Cronenberg	A Dangerous Method
Best Director	Ed Gass-Donnelly	Small Town Murder Songs
Best Director	Ken Scott	Starbuck
Best Director	Jean-Marc Vallée	Café de Flore
Best British Columbia Film	Joel Heath	People of a Feather
Best British Columbia Film	Carl Bessai	Sisters & Brothers
Best British Columbia Film	Michael Goldbach	Daydream Nation
Special Achievement	Marv Newland	
