= Christie MacFadyen =

Canadian actress

Christie MacFadyen is a Canadian actress best known for appearing in the film The Top of His Head.

== Selected filmography ==
- Scissere (1982)
- The Top of His Head (1989)
- Swoon (1992)
- Spare Me (1992)
- Left Behind: The Movie (2000)
- Clean Rite Cowboy (2000)
- Too Much Sex (2000)
- Left Behind II: Tribulation Force (2002)
- Ararat (2002)
- Good Fences (2003)
