= Spare Me =

Spare Me may refer to:

- "Spare Me" (Beavis and Butt-head), an episode of Beavis and Butt-head
- Spare Me (film), a 1992 film
