= Dylan Macleod =

Canadian cinematographer

- Occupation: Cinematographer

Dylan Macleod is a Canadian cinematographer. He won a Gemini Award for Best Photography in a Variety or Performing Arts Program or Series at the 25th Gemini Awards in 2010 for the television film Nureyev, a Canadian Screen Award for Best Photography in a Variety or Performing Arts or Sketch Comedy Program at the 1st Canadian Screen Awards for Love Lies Bleeding. and the Borsos Competition award for best cinematography in a Canadian film at the 2015 Whistler Film Festival, for his work on Ingrid Veninger's 2015 film He Hated Pigeons.

== Filmography ==
=== Films ===
- Love Come Down (2001)
- Evelyn: The Cutest Evil Dead Girl (2002)
- Civic Duty (2006)
- Ground Rules (2009)
- He Hated Pigeons (2015)
- Trench 11 (2017)

=== Television ===
- Nureyev (2009)
- Bad Blood (2018)
- Cardinal (2018–19)
- The Boys (2019)
