= The End of Time (2012 film) =

- Film poster
- Directed by: Peter Mettler
- Written by: Peter Mettler
- Produced by: Gerry Flahive; Brigitte Hofer; Cornelia Seitler; Ingrid Veninger
- Narrated by: Peter Mettler
- Cinematography: Peter Mettler; Camille Budin; Nicholas de Pencier
- Edited by: Peter Mettler; Roland Schlimme
- Music by: Gabriel Scotti; Vincent Haenni
- Production companies: Maximage; Grimthorpe Film; National Film Board of Canada
- Distributed by: First Run Features (U.S.)
- Release date: August 4, 2012 (LIFF)
- Running time: 109 minutes
- Countries: Switzerland; Canada
- Language: English
- Box office: $13,056 (US)

The End of Time is a 2012 Swiss-Canadian documentary film edited, shot, narrated, written, and directed by Peter Mettler on the loose subject of time.

== Synopsis ==
Mettler interviews a range of people, including particle physicists at the Large Hadron Collider, DJ Richie Hawtin, an environmentalist, activists who seek to renovate Detroit, a hermit who lives on an island threatened by a volcano, and Indian Buddhists, who perform a funeral ritual. Each give their interpretation of what time is and what it means to them. The final interview subject, Mettler's mother, says that we must use what time we are given well.

== Cast ==
- Peter Mettler
- Richie Hawtin

== Reception ==
On the review aggregator website Rotten Tomatoes, 78% of nine critics' reviews are positive, with an average rating of 7.6/10. Metacritic, which uses a weighted average, assigned the film a score of 56 out of 100, based on six critics, indicating "mixed or average" reviews.

Jay Weissberg of Variety wrote, "Intermittently interesting but more often pretentious, this sluggish exploration of time as real and conceived concepts rarely does more than regurgitate philosophical platitudes without locating the depth to make them interesting." Stephen Dalton of The Hollywood Reporter wrote, "Any sense of narrative momentum or intellectual focus quickly unravels as the film evolves into an almost wordless symphony of disconnected images, sounds and music. But the nature-heavy montages are mostly beautiful and bizarre enough to excuse the film’s pretentious excesses." Peter Howell of the Toronto Star rated it 3.5/4 stars and wrote, "Mettler makes a profound statement on what makes all of us tick." Liam Lacey of The Globe and Mail rated it 2.5/4 stars and wrote that the film "offers lots of opportunities to gaze and muse" but does not offer insights in the subject. Miriam Bale of The New York Times called the film "a form of enforced meditation." Eric Hynes of Time Out New York wrote, "Peter Mettler's ruminative, frequently astounding essay film doesn’t just contemplate this notion; it aims to cinematically embody it." Calum Marsh of The Village Voice praised the cinematography but said that the film's pontificating is unnecessary.

The film was included in the Toronto International Film Festival's list of "Canada's Top Ten" feature films of 2012. It was nominated for best documentary film, best film score, and best cinematography at the 2013 Swiss Film Awards.
