= The Top of His Head (soundtrack) =

Soundtrack album by Fred Frith
- Released: 1989
- Recorded: 1988, Canada
- Genre: Avant-rock
- Length: 43:53 (LP); 51:29 (CD)
- Label: Crammed (Belgium)
- Producer: Fred Frith

Fred Frith chronology
The Technology of Tears (1988)	The Top of His Head (1989)	Step Across the Border (1990)

Music for Film series chronology
The Top of His Head (1989)	Step Across the Border (1990)

The Top of His Head is a soundtrack by English guitarist, composer and improvisor Fred Frith, of the 1989 Canadian comedy-drama film, The Top of His Head. Frith wrote and composed all the music, with the exception of "This Old Earth", which was written and sung by Jane Siberry, and a cover of "The Way You Look Tonight". The music was recorded at l'Office National du Film, Montreal, Quebec, Canada in August and September 1988, and was released on LP and CD in 1989 by the Belgian independent label, Crammed Discs. The CD release contained two extra tracks, "Driving to the Train" and "The Long Drive".

Siberry's song, "This Old Earth", was nominated for Best Original Song at the 1990 Genie Awards. Siberry rerecorded the song as "Something About Trains", and it appeared on her 1989 album Bound by the Beauty.

== Reception ==
Professional ratings
Review scores
Source	Rating
AllMusic	3/5 stars

In a review at AllMusic, Ted Mills described The Top of His Head soundtrack as "[a] less aggressive work compared to [Frith's] other releases, though not exactly gentle by any means." Mills said the atmosphere of the album is "moody", and many of the tracks include "synthesizer and guitar drones", and "industrial environmental collages". The exception is Siberry's "This Old Earth", which Mills felt comes across as "an almost normal song".

Nicole V. Gagné wrote in her 1990 book, Sonic Transports: New Frontiers in Our Music that The Top of His Head has "some of the strongest pieces Frith has ever made". She called "Driving to the Train" "astounding", and described the two guitars on "Gus Escapes" as "one of the most memorable duets of any Frith recording". Gagné was pleased to see the return of humour on the album after its absence on The Technology of Tears, but added that "you can feel a dark undercurrent, the frustrated inarticulacy of Speechless".

== Track listing ==
All tracks composed by Fred Frith except where stated.

=== LP release ===
Side one
No.	Title	Length
1.	"Title Theme"	1:49
2.	"Wheels Within"	2:31
3.	"Hold on Hold"	2:22
4.	"Lucy Leaves a Note"	2:25
5.	"Gus Escapes"	2:19
6.	"Gravity's a Rule"	2:15
7.	"Channel Change"	3:20
8.	"Orbit"	1:24
9.	"Fall to Call"	3:52

Side two
No.	Title	Length
10.	"Underwater Dream"	2:29
11.	"This Old Earth" (Siberry)	3:21
12.	"Donuts"	2:54
13.	"Lucy"	2:05
14.	"The Premonition"	1:26
15.	"Questions and Answers"	2:47
16.	"The Performance"	2:56
17.	"The Way You Look Tonight" (Kern, Fields) / "Title Theme (Conclusion)"	3:38

=== CD release ===
No.	Title	Length
1.	"Title Theme"	1:49
2.	"Driving to the Train" (♯)	2:45
3.	"Wheels Within"	2:31
4.	"Hold on Hold"	2:22
5.	"Lucy Leaves a Note"	2:25
6.	"Gus Escapes"	2:19
7.	"Gravity's a Rule"	2:15
8.	"Channel Change"	3:20
9.	"Orbit"	1:24
10.	"Fall to Call"	3:52
11.	"Underwater Dream"	2:29
12.	"This Old Earth" (Siberry)	3:21
13.	"Donuts"	2:54
14.	"The Long Drive" (♯)	4:51
15.	"Lucy"	2:05
16.	"The Premonition"	1:26
17.	"Questions and Answers"	2:47
18.	"The Performance"	2:56
19.	"The Way You Look Tonight" (Kern, Fields) / "Title Theme (Conclusion)"	3:38

♯ denotes bonus tracks

== Personnel ==
- Fred Frith – all other instruments, machines, radios, tapes, programming
- Anne Bourne – cello, accordion
- Jean Derome – saxophones
- Jane Siberry – voice, guitar ("This Old Earth"), accordion ("This Old Earth")
- Christie Macfadyen – voice
- Ken Myhr – slide guitar ("This Old Earth")
- Peter Mettler – additional tapes, influence, advice

Source: Liner notes

== Works cited ==
- Gagné, Nicole V. (1990). Sonic Transports: New Frontiers in Our Music. De Falco Books. ISBN 978-0-9625145-0-0.
