= Eastern Avenue (film) =

- Directed by: Peter Mettler
- Written by: Peter Mettler
- Produced by: Peter Mettler
- Cinematography: Peter Mettler
- Edited by: Peter Mettler
- Music by: Peter Mettler
- Release date: September 1985 (TIFF)
- Running time: 56 minutes
- Country: Canada

Eastern Avenue is a Canadian avant-garde documentary film, written and directed by Peter Mettler and released in 1985. The film is an expressionistic video diary of his travels in Europe, documenting images from Portugal, Switzerland and Berlin, with ambient sound but virtually no spoken dialogue or narration.

The film's title derives from Mettler's residence on Toronto's Eastern Avenue at the time of the film's making, representing Mettler's point of departure and of return.

It premiered at the 1985 Toronto International Film Festival.
