= Petropolis: Aerial Perspectives on the Alberta Tar Sands =

2009 Canadian documentary film

- Film poster
- Directed by: Peter Mettler
- Written by: Peter Mettler
- Produced by: Sandy Hunter; Laura Severinac
- Cinematography: Ron Chapple
- Edited by: Roland Schlimme
- Music by: Gabriel Scotti; Vincent Hänni
- Production company: Greenpeace Canada
- Distributed by: Mongrel Media
- Release date: September 2009 (TIFF)
- Running time: 40 minutes
- Country: Canada
- Language: English

Petropolis: Aerial Perspectives on the Alberta Tar Sands is a 2009 Canadian short documentary film directed and written by Peter Mettler. Produced by Greenpeace Canada, the film uses aerial imagery to show the Alberta oil sands and the environmental effects of bitumen extraction. Its awards included wins at Festival dei Popoli and Visions du Réel, and a nomination for Best Short Documentary at the 30th Genie Awards. The film screened at the 2009 Toronto International Film Festival and later at festivals in Rotterdam, Montreal and Solothurn.

== Synopsis ==
The film provides an aerial view of the Alberta oil sands project and the environmental damage associated with it. It notes that the oil sands form an oil reserve roughly the size of England. The film shows the industrial extraction of bitumen from beneath wilderness areas and examines its environmental consequences. It uses aerial imagery and sound to portray the landscape created by petroleum extraction.

== Production ==
Petropolis is the first film ever produced by Greenpeace Canada.

== Release ==
In 2009, the film was screened at festivals including the 15th Visions du Réel - Festival international in Nyon, the 34th Toronto International Film Festival, the 38th Festival du Nouveau Cinéma Montréal and the 52nd International Leipzig Festival for Documentary and Animated Film. In 2010, it screened at festivals including the 39th International Film Festival Rotterdam and the 51st Festival dei Popoli Firenze. It later screened at the 49th Solothurner Filmtage in 2014.

It had a limited theatrical run in January 2010. It was released on DVD in April 2010.

== Reception ==
=== Critical response ===
On the review aggregator website Rotten Tomatoes, 89% of nine critics' reviews are positive.

Philip French of The Observer described the film as a "short, hallucinatory documentary" whose aerial images showed the damage caused by bitumen extraction.

In Environmental History, the film was described as "visually stunning" and "much more art film than documentary". The reviewer wrote that its power lay in conveying the scale and scope of energy extraction, and that its near-exclusive use of aerial photography offered a view of mining and refining that was both "wondrous and grotesque".

=== Awards and nominations ===
In 2009, the film won awards including the Premio per la Distribuzione at the Festival dei Popoli in Florence and the Prix du jeune public at Visions du Réel in Nyon. It was later a Genie Award nominee for Best Short Documentary at the 30th Genie Awards in 2010.
