= Minister's zoning orders controversy =

Canadian provincial issue since 2019

From 2019 onward, the use of Ministerial orders by Ontario's minister of municipal affairs and housing to override municipal development decisions has been criticized, in both their frequency of use and the way it has been used by the Progressive Conservative government.

== Minister's Zoning Orders ==
Under the Planning Act, the Minister of Municipal Affairs and Housing has the authority to issue a minister's zoning order (MZO) over any property in the province, determining the development plan for that property even if it overrules a municipal zoning bylaw. There is no process for appealing an MZO. The use of MZOs has traditionally been reserved mostly for emergency situations, such as after the collapse of the Algo Centre Mall, which killed two people.

== First Ford term (2018–2022) ==
Between 2019 and early 2021, Ford's government issued well over 30 MZOs, approaching the total of 49 MZOs that had been issued in the province between the 1969 and 2000, a period of three decades.

In October 2020, the government issued a set of MZOs aimed at the West Don Lands in Toronto, allowing for towers up to 50 storeys tall to be built without the city's approval. Several Toronto city councillors voiced their disapproval of the orders, with mayor John Tory stating that "I think that is a less than ideal situation, to say the least." In January 2021, a number of community groups protested against the attempted demolition of heritage-listed buildings at the Dominion Foundry Site. Court action forced province to pause demolition until legal issues could be resolved.

In December 2020, the government passed Bill 229, the Protect, Support and Recover from COVID-19 Act (Budget Measures), 2020. The bill contained a number of changes to development regulations in the province, notably eliminating the ability of conservation authorities to veto MZOs.

In early March 2021, the government issued a further six MZOs, of which half overrided environmental limits on development proposals from Flato Developments. While announcing the MZOs, Ford defended his government's use of the orders, stating that "we will never stop issuing MZOs for the people of Ontario." Later that month, the government issued another order for a plot on the west side of Beeton, allowing Flato Developments to build a 995 units on the site, despite the site being located on a flood plain managed by the Nottawasaga Conservation Authority.

In April 2021, the government passed Bill 257, the Supporting Broadband and Infrastructure Expansion Act, 2021. Schedule 3 of the Act implemented further amendments to the Planning Act allowing it to issue MZOs that clash with the provincial government's development master plans. The bill further applied to all previously issued MZOs retroactively.

== Reactions ==
The government has defended its use of the orders, arguing that they are necessary to help create jobs and affordable housing, especially in the midst of the COVID-19 pandemic in Ontario. The government has also stated that it only issues them in accordance with the wishes of the local municipalities.

The government's use of MZOs has been described as part of a strongman approach to governance by Ford, preferring to force through policies without consideration of the destabilising effects it could have. Some commentators have described the government's use of MZOs as undemocratic and have accused the government of trying to evade accountability. The Ontario Federation of Agriculture stated that the "frequent use [of the orders] undermines Ontario’s long-established system of land use planning."

The government has been accused of corruption over its use of MZOs, particularly by favouring developers close to the Progressive Conservative Party. In December 2020, the Ontario NDP released evidence suggesting that around half of the MZOs issued by the government since March 2020 predominately benefited developers that had links to the Progressive Conservative Party.

Greenpeace and the Hamilton Spectator have criticised the environmental impact the government's use of MZOs would have, such as the plan to pave over parts of the Lower Duffins Creek wetland in Pickering and the plan for greenbelt development. Environmental Defence Canada has campaigned against the use of the orders, stating that "in addition to creating long term damage to the environment, increasing property taxes, and enabling more sprawl to eat up Ontario’s best farmland, the Minister has sent a strong message to the Ontario public that their opinion isn’t valuable, that experts don’t matter and that decisions enabling development are his alone."

The chair of the greenbelt council and 6 of its members resigned over Bill 229, in relation to the restrictions on the powers of conservation authorities concerning MZOs and other restrictions on their power.

== Auditor General report ==
In the Auditor General of Ontario's 2024 annual report found that the Ford government's process was unstructured and "[gave] the appearance of preferential treatment". The report found that the process resulted in a 17-fold increase from 2019 to 2023 and did forced civil servants to stop providing merits recommendations in addition to basic summaries. Some approvals were granted for sites where construction could not start for years or at locations where key utilities would not be present for potentially decades after the MZO approval. The AG found that MZOs rezoning agricultural land led to an average value increase of 46% for the property owners. The government also did not track if the MZOs would result in more affordable housing and ignored the advice of experts, municipalities, and other government ministries. The AG said that for the 114 of the 169 total MZOs issued, the normal municipal approvals process would have been preferable to the government's "ad hoc" process. In at least four cases the AG found proof that political staffers prioritized civil servants' efforts on projects that they had been lobbied on.

== See also ==
- Premiership of Doug Ford
- Zoning
