= While the Green Grass Grows: A Diary in Seven Parts =

- Film poster
- Directed by: Peter Mettler
- Written by: Peter Mettler
- Produced by: Peter Mettler; Brigitte Hofer; Cornelia Seitler
- Cinematography: Peter Mettler
- Edited by: Peter Mettler; Jordan Kawai
- Production companies: Grimthorpe Film; Maximage
- Release date: September 7, 2025 (TIFF)
- Running time: 420 minutes
- Countries: Canada; Switzerland
- Languages: English; Swiss German; Spanish

While the Green Grass Grows: A Diary in Seven Parts is a 2025 Swiss-Canadian documentary film that offers a personal reflection on love, life, and the Earth's energy cycles. It is edited, shot, produced, written, and directed by Peter Mettler. Atom Egoyan is one of the executive producers.

Two chapters of the film were screened at the 2023 editions of Visions du Réel and the Montreal International Documentary Festival, winning the Grand Prize at Visions du Réel and the Grand Prize in the National Feature competition at RIDM.

The full film premiered at the 2025 Toronto International Film Festival.

== Critical response ==
Pat Mullen of Point of View wrote that "These associations and connective tissues invite an active and immersive cinematic experience, although one might best reconnoitre it in a way that lends appropriate time for pause and reflection. While the Green Grass Grows, which screened in full for this review with an intermission between chapters four and five, might best be experienced as a series with each episode explored as its own adventure to later be taken in as a collective journey, much like 2022 TIFF Docs series Self-Portrait as a Coffee Pot. The film’s design invites such a viewing, and the more space one has to marinate in it, the better."

== See also ==
- List of longest films
