= Cave of Forgotten Dreams =

2010 documentary film by Werner Herzog

- Directed by: Werner Herzog
- Written by: Werner Herzog
- Produced by: Erik Nelson; Adrienne Ciuffo
- Narrated by: Werner Herzog
- Cinematography: Peter Zeitlinger
- Edited by: Joe Bini; Maya Hawke
- Music by: Ernst Reijseger
- Production companies: History Films; Creative Differences; Ministère de la Culture et de la Communication; Arte France; Werner Herzog Filmproduktion; More4
- Distributed by: IFC Films; Sundance Selects
- Release dates: 13 September 2010 (TIFF); 25 March 2011 (United Kingdom); 29 April 2011 (United States)
- Running time: 89 minutes
- Countries: Canada; United States; France; Germany; United Kingdom
- Language: English
- Box office: $8 million

Cave of Forgotten Dreams is a 2010 3D documentary film by Werner Herzog about the Chauvet Cave in Southern France, which contains some of the oldest human-painted images yet discovered—some of them were crafted around 32,000 years ago. It consists of footage from inside the cave, as well as of the nearby Pont d'Arc natural bridge, alongside interviews with various scientists and historians. The film premiered on 13 September 2010 at the Toronto International Film Festival.

== Production ==
Herzog's interest in Chauvet Cave, and the paintings inside, was prompted by an article in The New Yorker titled "First Impressions" (2008) by Judith Thurman. She became one of the co-producers of the film.

To help preserve the artwork, access to the cave is restricted, and the general public is not allowed to enter. Herzog had to get special permission from the French Minister of Culture to film inside. He was given approval for six shooting days of four hours each, with numerous restrictions. Everyone authorized to enter Chauvet Cave must wear special suits and fresh shoes that have not been worn outside, and, because of near-toxic levels of radon and carbon dioxide in the cave, nobody could stay inside for more than a few hours each day. Herzog was allowed to bring only a four-person crew into the cave, so he was accompanied by cinematographer Peter Zeitlinger, a sound recordist (Eric Spitzer-Marlyn), and an assistant, and worked the lights himself. The crew was limited to battery-powered equipment that they could carry into the cave themselves and lights that gave off no excess heat. The crew had to stay on a 2-foot-wide (0.61 m) walkway, and could not touch any part of the cave's wall or floor.

The production encountered several technical difficulties in working with the 3-D cameras, which were custom-built for the production and often assembled inside the cave itself, in a documentary setting. At the time of production, 3-D films were typically shot on soundstages with strong use of digital manipulation. Often, foreground and background elements would be shot separately and digitally composited into the finished shot. As techniques for 3-D filmmaking in natural environments with a single camera and no compositing were largely undeveloped, the crew had to work these out experimentally in post-production.

Before filming Cave of Forgotten Dreams, Herzog was skeptical of the artistic value of 3-D filmmaking. He had seen only one 3-D film (James Cameron's 2009 film Avatar). Zeitlinger was the first to suggest using a 3-D camera for the film. Even entering the cave, he felt that 3-D might be appropriate to capture the contours of the walls. Herzog initially dismissed the idea, believing 3-D to be (in Zeitlinger's words) "a gimmick of the commercial cinema". But, once he visited the cave, he decided the film had to be shot in 3-D to "capture the intentions of the painters", who incorporated the wall's subtle bulges and contours into their art. After finishing work on Cave, Herzog said he had no plans to film again in 3-D.

Though Herzog has said he never dedicates films to anyone, the film ends with the dedication "For Roger Ebert" whom Herzog considered a friend.

== Release ==
The film was finished at the last minute, with only 30 minutes of footage completed on the Wednesday before its debut at the Toronto International Film Festival on Monday, 13 September 2010. It was the first 3-D film to screen at the festival's Lightbox theatre, and the digital projectors jammed five minutes from the end, interrupting the showing. When Herzog was asked why the French Ministry of Culture, who sponsored the film, did not require its premiere to be in France, he replied: "They didn't know it was finished."

Two days after the screening at TIFF, IFC Films announced it had secured the film's US distribution rights in a "mid-six-figure deal"; the television rights were already owned by the History Channel, which partially financed the film's production.

In January 2011, a trailer for the film was released that advertised a release date of Spring 2011. The film premiered in cinemas in the UK on 25 March 2011. Also in March, a second trailer, released for US distribution, announced a US release date of 29 April 2011.

Its opening weekend in the US, the film earned an average of $25,500 from each of the five screens on which it was shown in New York, Chicago, and Los Angeles; this was Herzog's best-ever per-theater opening, and the highest per-theater average of any film in the US that weekend. By 12 June 2011, the film had grossed $3.7 million in the US, making it the highest-grossing independently released documentary of 2011 by a wide margin.

In September 2025, Herzog screened a new 6K restoration of the documentary at the annual Telluride Film Festival, where it was announced the film would be re-released theatrically via Independent Film Company in early 2026. They later revealed the film would get a limited release in IMAX theatres for two days on April 15th and 19th, 2026, followed by a nationwide roll-out beginning April 24th.

== Reception ==
Critical reception to the film was positive. On the review aggregator website Rotten Tomatoes, it has an approval rating of 96%, based on 138 reviews, with an average score of 7.9 out of 10; the site's "critics consensus" states: "Hauntingly filmed and brimming with Herzog's infectious enthusiasm, Cave of Forgotten Dreams is a fascinating triumph." On Metacritic, the film has a weighted average score of 86 out of 100, based on 34 reviews, indicating "universal acclaim".

=== Awards and nominations ===
Group	Date of ceremony	Category	Result
Broadcast Film Critics Association	12 January 2012	Best Documentary	Nominated
Central Ohio Film Critics Association	5 January 2012	Best Documentary	Won
Chicago Film Critics Association	19 December 2011	Best Documentary	Nominated
Dallas–Fort Worth Film Critics Association	16 December 2011	Best Documentary	Won
Los Angeles Film Critics Association	11 December 2011	Best Documentary	Won
National Society of Film Critics	7 January 2012	Best Non-Fiction Film	Won
New York Film Critics Circle	9 January 2012	Best Non-Fiction Film	Won
New York Film Critics Online	11 December 2011	Best Documentary	Won
Online Film Critics Society	2 January 2012	Best Documentary	Won
San Diego Film Critics Society	14 December 2011	Best Documentary	Nominated
Vancouver Film Critics Circle	10 January 2012	Best Documentary	Won
Washington D.C. Area Film Critics Association	5 December 2011	Best Documentary	Won

== See also ==
- List of Stone Age art
- Art of the Upper Paleolithic
