= He Hated Pigeons =

2015 Canadian drama film

- Film poster
- Directed by: Ingrid Veninger
- Written by: Ingrid Veninger
- Produced by: Ingrid Veninger
- Starring: Pedro Fontaine; Cristobal Tapia Montt
- Cinematography: Dylan Macleod
- Edited by: Maureen Grant
- Music by: Ohad Benchetrit; Justin Small
- Production company: Punk Films
- Release date: 2015
- Running time: 80 minutes
- Countries: Canada; Chile
- Languages: Spanish; English

He Hated Pigeons is a 2015 Canadian-Chilean drama film, produced, written, and directed by Ingrid Veninger. The film stars Pedro Fontaine as Elias, a gay Chilean man travelling the length of the country following the death of his partner Sebastian (played by Cristobal Tapia Montt in flashbacks).

The film's music followed a unique model. Although a score was written by Ohad Benchetrit and Justin Small of the band Do Make Say Think, it was not included in the film print, and instead was performed live by various musicians at each public screening of the film. The musicians performing the score were further permitted to improvise, so that each performance of the score would be unique.

The film was made after Veninger travelled to Chile to attend a retrospective screening of her work at a film festival; as she was not fluent in Spanish, Fontaine was hired as her interpreter, and Veninger decided to make a film with him after getting to know him.

Dylan Macleod won the Borsos Competition award for best cinematography in a Canadian film at the 2015 Whistler Film Festival.
