= Modra (film) =

- Film poster
- Directed by: Ingrid Veninger
- Produced by: Ingrid Veninger
- Starring: Hallie Switzer; Alexander Gammel
- Cinematography: Ian Anderson
- Edited by: Aren Hansen
- Music by: John Welsman
- Production company: pUNK Films
- Release date: September 15, 2010 (Toronto)
- Running time: 80 minutes
- Country: Canada
- Languages: English; Slovak

Modra is a Canadian drama film, directed by Ingrid Veninger and released in 2010. The film stars Hallie Switzer as Lina, a Canadian teenager visiting her extended family in Slovakia with her friend Leco (Alexander Gammell).

Switzer is Veninger's real-life daughter, and many of the extended family roles were played by Veninger's own real-life family.

The film premiered at the 2010 Toronto International Film Festival. It was subsequently named to TIFF's year-end Canada's Top Ten list for 2010.
