= Dallas–Fort Worth Film Critics Association Awards 2011 =

Annual US film awards ceremony

17th Dallas–Fort Worth Film Critics Association Awards
- Date: December 16, 2011
- Location: Dallas, Texas
- Country: United States
- Presented by: Dallas–Fort Worth Film Critics Association
- Website: dfwfilmcritics.net

The 17th Dallas–Fort Worth Film Critics Association Awards honoring the best in film for 2011 were announced on December 16, 2011. These awards "recognizing extraordinary accomplishment in film" are presented annually by the Dallas–Fort Worth Film Critics Association (DFWFCA), based in the Dallas–Fort Worth metroplex region of Texas. The organization, founded in 1990, includes 29 film critics for print, radio, television, and internet publications based in north Texas. The Dallas–Fort Worth Film Critics Association began presenting its annual awards list in 1991.

The Descendants was the DFWFCA's most awarded film of 2011 taking top honors in the Best Picture, Best Actor (George Clooney), Best Supporting Actress (Shailene Woodley), Best Director (Alexander Payne), and Best Screenplay (Alexander Payne, Nat Faxon, and Jim Rash) categories. This continued a trend of critics groups across the United States giving their top prizes to the film about a family dealing with betrayal, loss, and change.

No other film earned multiple 2011 honors from the critics association. Beginners earned Christopher Plummer the Best Supporting Actor honor for his performance as Hal. The other acting award went to Michelle Williams as Best Actress for her leading role as Marilyn Monroe in My Week with Marilyn. His work on The Tree of Life earned Emmanuel Lubezki the honor for Best Cinematography. The remaining film honors went to Rango as Best Animated Film, Cave of Forgotten Dreams as Best Documentary, and Iran's A Separation as Best Foreign Language Film.

Along with the 11 "best of" category awards, the group also presented the Russell Smith Award to We Need to Talk About Kevin as the "best low-budget or cutting-edge independent film" of the year. The award is named in honor of late Dallas Morning News film critic Russell Smith.

== Winners ==
Winners are listed first and highlighted with boldface. Other films ranked by the annual poll are listed in order. While most categories saw 5 honorees named, some categories ranged from as many as 10 (Best Film) to as few as 2 (Best Cinematography, Best Animated Film, Best Screenplay).

=== Category awards ===
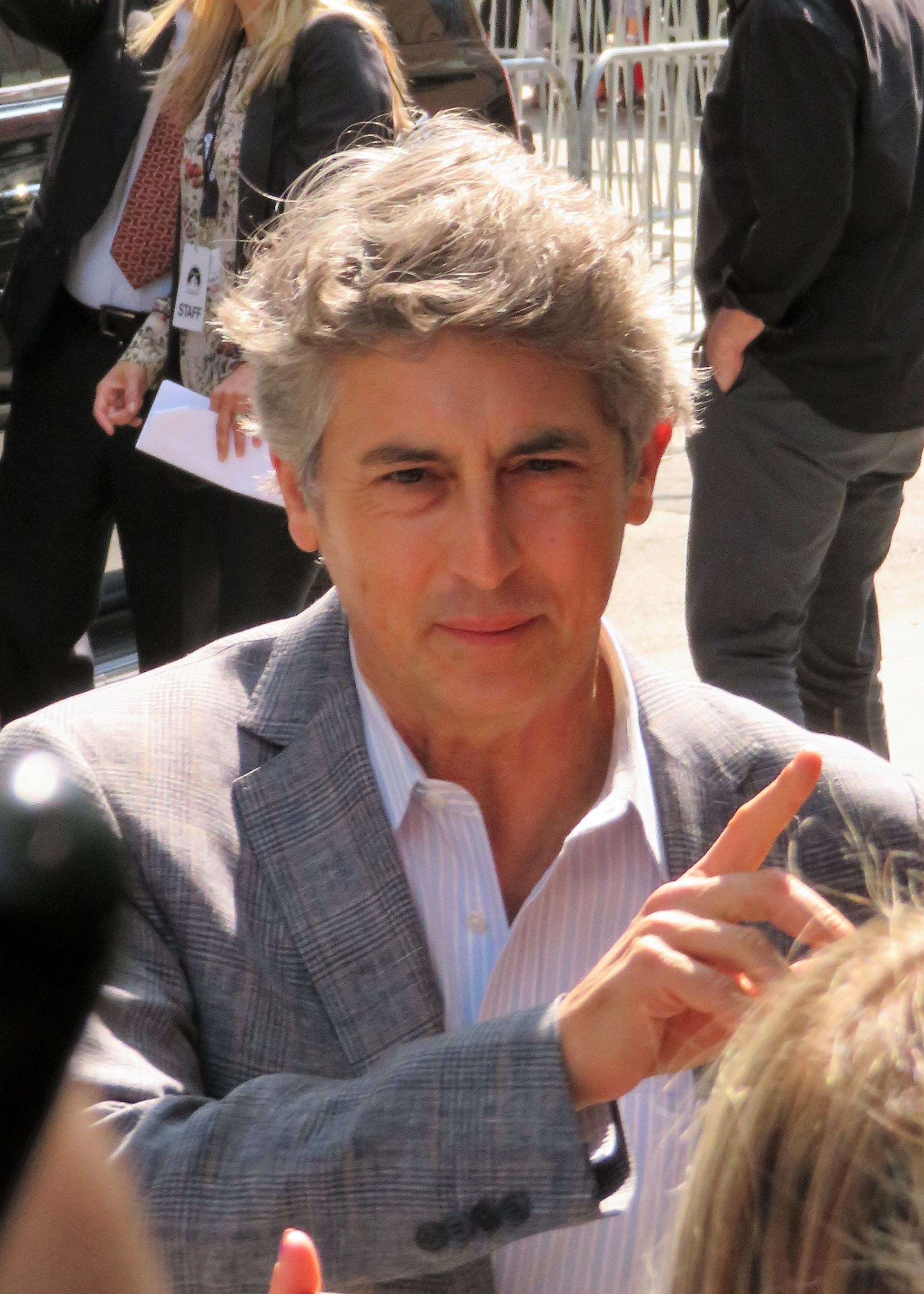
Alexander Payne, Best Director winner

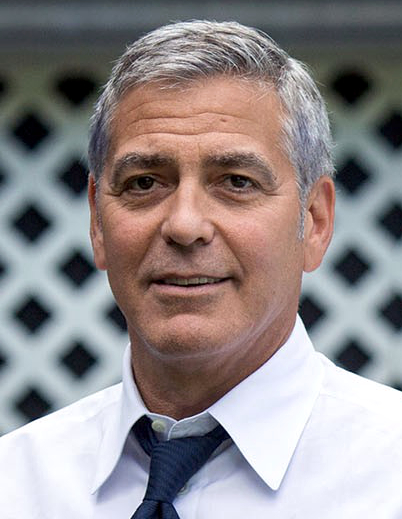
George Clooney, Best Actor winner

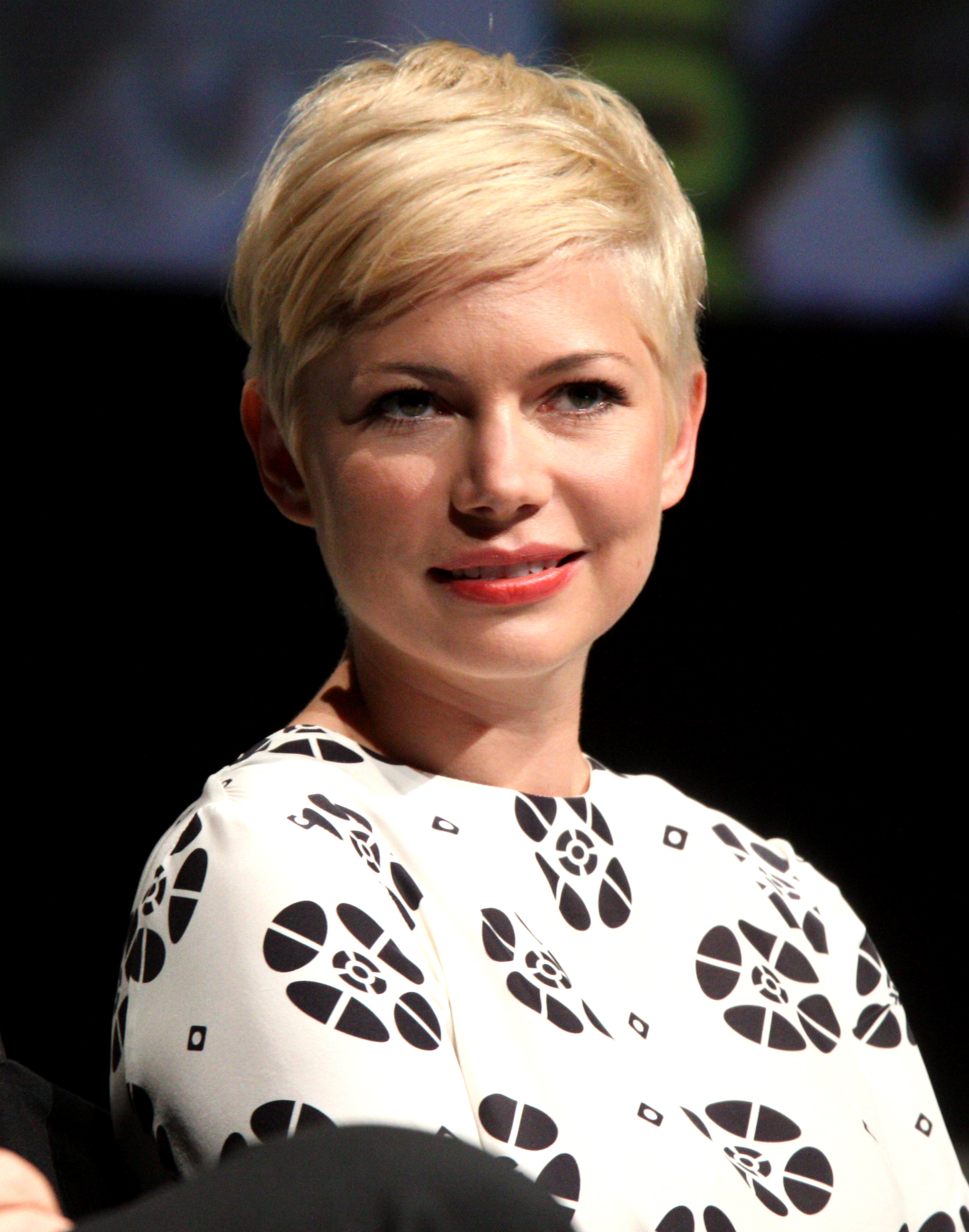
Michelle Williams, Best Actress winner

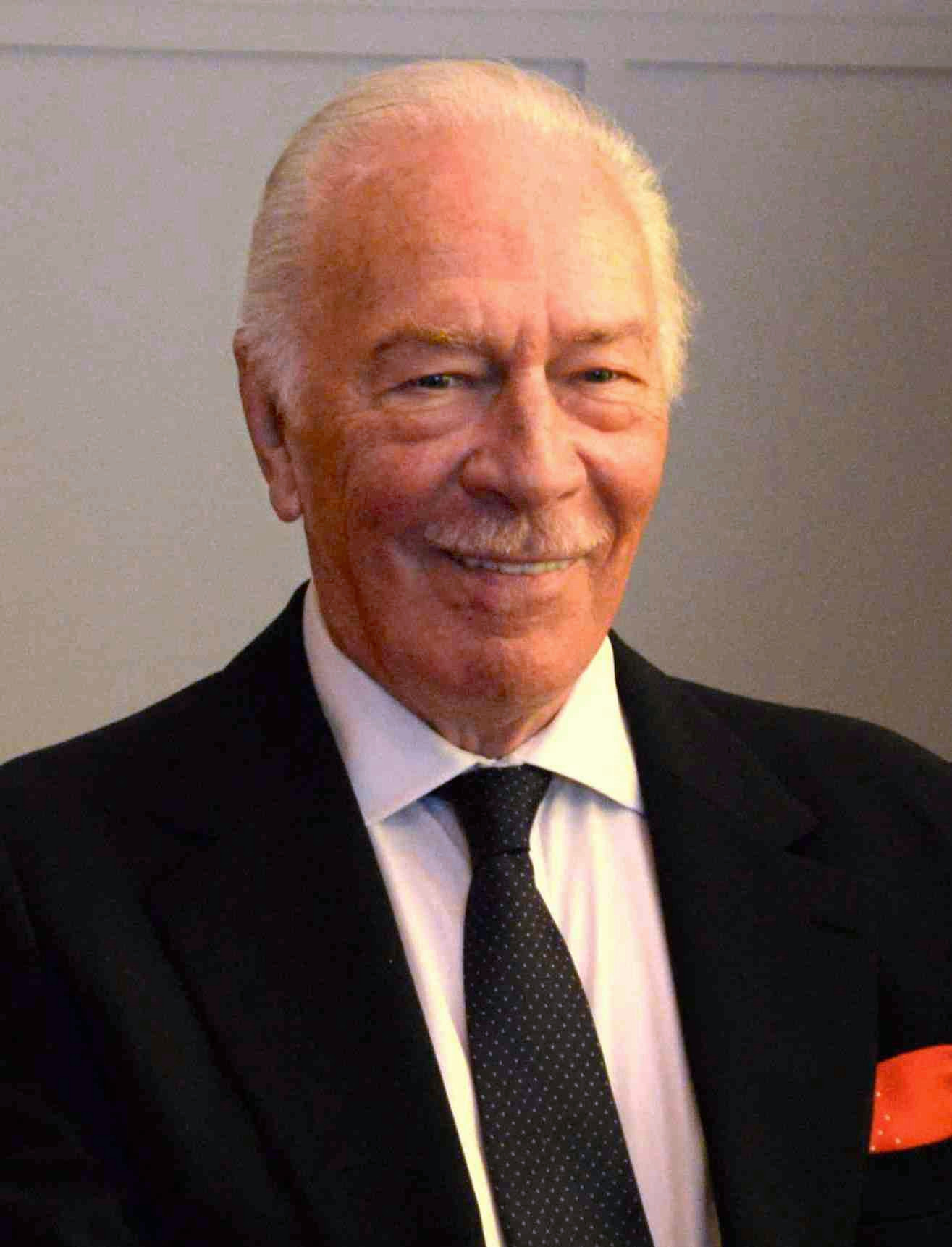
Christopher Plummer, Best Supporting Actor winner

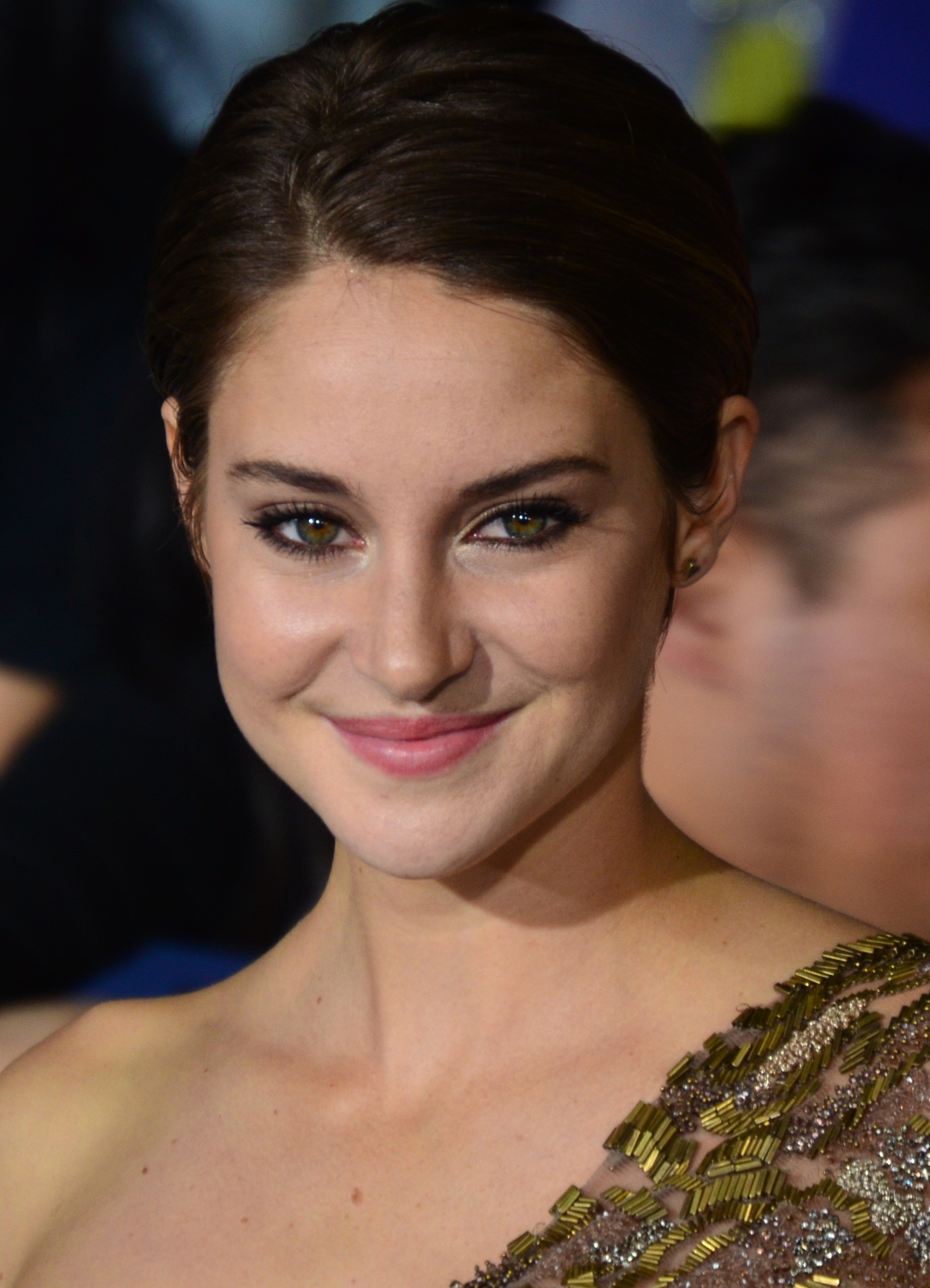
Shailene Woodley, Best Supporting Actress winner

Best Picture	Best Foreign Language Film
1. **The Descendants**; 2. The Artist; 3. Extremely Loud and Incredibly Close; 4. Midnight in Paris; 5. The Tree of Life; 6. Hugo; 7. 50/50; 8. Drive; 9. Shame; 10. Moneyball	1. **A Separation** • Iran; 2. The Skin I Live In • Spain; 3. Incendies • Canada; 4. 13 Assassins • Japan; 5. Of Gods and Men • France **(TIE)** Certified Copy • France **(TIE)**
Best Actor	Best Actress
1. **George Clooney** - The Descendants as Matt King; 2. Jean Dujardin - The Artist as George Valentin; 3. Michael Fassbender - Shame as Brandon Sullivan; 4. Brad Pitt - Moneyball as Billy Beane; 5. Michael Shannon - Take Shelter as Curtis LaForche	1. **Michelle Williams** - My Week with Marilyn as Marilyn Monroe; 2. Tilda Swinton - We Need to Talk About Kevin as Eva Khatchadourian; 3. Meryl Streep - The Iron Lady as Margaret Thatcher; 4. Charlize Theron - Young Adult as Mavis Gary; 5. Kirsten Dunst - Melancholia as Justine
Best Supporting Actor	Best Supporting Actress
1. **Christopher Plummer** - Beginners as Hal Fields; 2. Albert Brooks - Drive as Bernie Rose; 3. Max von Sydow - Extremely Loud and Incredibly Close as The Renter; 4. Armie Hammer - J. Edgar as Clyde Tolson; 5. Kenneth Branagh - My Week with Marilyn as Laurence Olivier	1. **Shailene Woodley** - The Descendants as Alexandra King; 2. Bérénice Bejo - The Artist as Peppy Miller; 3. Octavia Spencer - The Help as Minny Jackson; 4. Melissa McCarthy - Bridesmaids as Megan Price; 5. Carey Mulligan - Shame as Sissy Sullivan
Best Director	Best Documentary Film
1. **Alexander Payne** - The Descendants; 2. Michel Hazanavicius - The Artist; 3. Terrence Malick - The Tree of Life; 4. Martin Scorsese - Hugo; 5. Woody Allen - Midnight in Paris	1. **Cave of Forgotten Dreams**; 2. Project Nim; 3. The Interrupters; 4. Page One: Inside the New York Times; 5. Buck
Best Animated Film	Best Cinematography
1. **Rango**; 2. The Adventures of Tintin: The Secret of the Unicorn	1. **Emmanuel Lubezki** - The Tree of Life; 2. Janusz Kamiński - War Horse
Best Screenplay	
1. **Alexander Payne**, **Nat Faxon**, and **Jim Rash** - The Descendants; 2. Woody Allen - Midnight in Paris	

=== Individual awards ===
==== Russell Smith Award ====
- We Need to Talk About Kevin, for "best low-budget or cutting-edge independent film"
