= Dominion Foundry Site =

Group of heritage buildings in Toronto, Canada

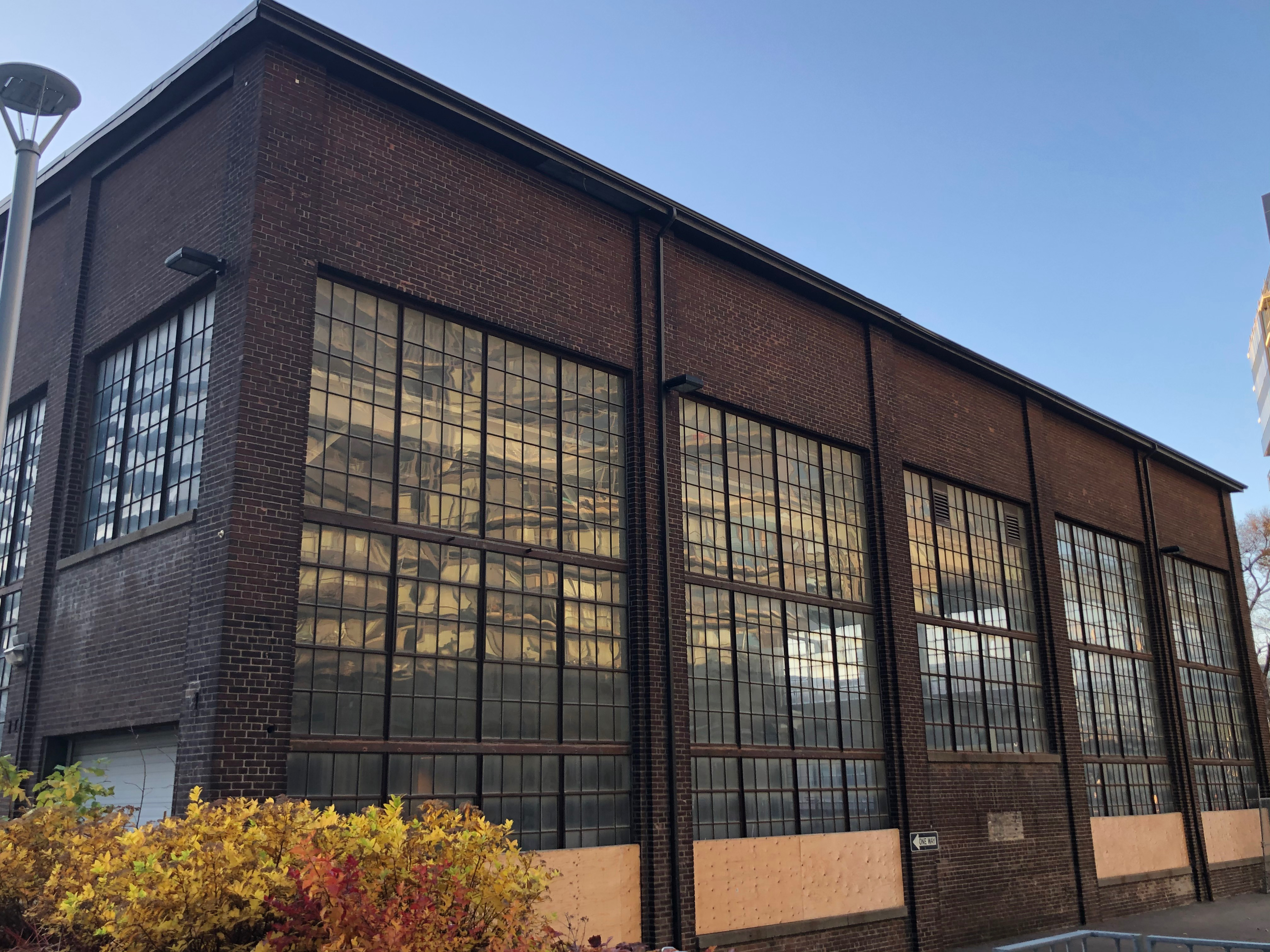
Southeast corner of the machine shop, Dominion Wheel & Foundries

The Dominion Foundry Site is a group of heritage industrial buildings in Toronto, Ontario, Canada. The site was developed by Dominion Wheel & Foundries Limited, a rail parts manufacturer based in Toronto. Now publicly owned, the site is planned for sale and redevelopment. The plans for redevelopment by the Government of Ontario have been controversial, sparking public opposition.

The factory site was owned by Canadian Northern Railway and later by Canadian National Railway. The remaining structures on site consist of a cleaning room (153 Eastern; built 1953), warehouse (169 Eastern; built 1917), office building (171 Eastern; built 1930) and machine shop (185 Eastern; built 1935 and enlarged 1939). These buildings were part of a much larger complex once engaged in building railway equipment, rolling stock, and machinery. In 2004, the site was added to the City of Toronto Heritage Property Inventory as having heritage significance.

On October 22, 2020, the Government of Ontario issued a Minister's Zoning Order (MZO) for this property, which overrode the city's current zoning for this site. This MZO would permit three residential towers with a maximum height of 141 metres (40+ stories) to be built on the site. The Corktown Association proposed its vision for how the site could be re-purposed. The province secretly agreed to sell this land in September 2020, for a "proposed development consisting of three residential buildings (two market condo buildings at 43 and 34-stories, and one 18-story affordable rental building) on the site". This agreement to sell was approved one month before the MZO, and four months before demolition commenced.

The province commenced demolition of these four heritage buildings on January 18, 2021, but paused on January 21, due to widespread community objections.

Nearby St. Lawrence Neighbourhood Association, supported by urgent community fundraising, made a court application on January 21 seeking an order to stop demolition. On January 29, 2021, Judge D.L. Corbett of the Ontario Divisional Court ordered a month-long halt to the demolition by the province of the historic Dominion Foundry buildings. After the temporary halt was granted by the courts, demolition machinery was removed from the historic site but not before the historic Gatekeepers House was razed to the ground. In his ruling, Judge Corbett ruled that the demolition was in breach of Ontario's obligation to the City of Toronto and in contravention of the Ontario Heritage Act. Citing "serious mistakes" were made by Ontario government officials, Judge Corbitt observed that it was only through the sustained opposition of daily protests that the historic buildings were not entirely destroyed. Foundry protesters believe Premier Ford's decision was not a mistake but a deliberate attempt to circumvent laws and public consultations with Toronto communities that would enrich a Conservative donor base at the expense of democratic institutions that hold such egregious power in check. Paul King, former chair of Community Heritage Ontario and member of the St. Marys Municipal Heritage Committee remarked that, "[t]his draconian interference by the Minister of Municipal Affairs and Housing through a MZO [Minister's Zoning Order], which (amongst other concerns) overrides the normal planning process without regard for input by the municipal government or local citizens, combined with the Province blatantly ignoring its own rules for the protection of significant heritage properties, is deeply disturbing." In fact, Infrastructure Ontario (the agency managing the property) decided to demolish the heritage buildings without first providing a Heritage Assessment Report to Toronto in accordance with the subdivision agreement, did not disclose publicly its intention to demolish the buildings, did not disclose publicly the Heritage Assessment Report written by one of its employees, and did not undertake any "public engagement" respecting the demolition of the historic buildings.

A full court application, scheduled to be heard by Ontario Divisional Court on February 26, 2021, has been temporarily adjourned.

Following the temporary court order stopping demolition, the Ontario government initiated a public consultation for the site. This public consultation period prompted KPMB Architects and Urban Strategies to prepare concept plans to show how the site could be decontaminated and developed while both keeping some of the heritage buildings and providing a comparable amount of affordable housing.
