= The Top of His Head =

- Directed by: Peter Mettler
- Written by: Peter Mettler
- Produced by: Niv Fichman
- Starring: Christie MacFadyen; Stephen Ouimette; Gary Reineke
- Cinematography: Peter Mettler; Tobias A. Schliessler; Gerald Packer
- Edited by: Peter Mettler; Margaret Van Eerdewijk
- Music by: Fred Frith; Jane Siberry
- Production companies: Rhombus Media; Grimthorpe Film Inc.
- Distributed by: Cinephile
- Release date: August 3, 1989
- Running time: 110 minutes
- Country: Canada
- Language: English

The Top of His Head is a 1989 Canadian comedy-drama film written and directed by Peter Mettler. It stars Stephen Ouimette, Christie MacFadyen and Gary Reineke, and tells the story of a satellite-dish salesman whose ordered life is disrupted after he meets a performance artist. The film won the Silver Plate Award at the Figueira da Foz Festival and received three Genie Award nominations.

== Synopsis ==
The film follows Gus Victor, a satellite-dish salesman whose routine is unsettled by his encounter with Lucy, a radical performance artist. After Lucy leaves him a cryptic note, Gus sets out to find her, and the search changes his understanding of himself.

== Cast ==
The cast includes:

- Stephen Ouimette as Gus Victor
- Gary Reineke as Berge
- Christie MacFadyen as Lucy Ripley
- David Fox as Uncle Hugo
- Julie Wildman as Mrs. Victor
- David Main as Mr. Victor
- Alexander Maidan as Justin Miller
- Diana Barrington as Yolanda
- John Paul Young as the car salesman
- Julian Richings as Robert
- Joey Hardin as Joey

== Production ==
The film was shot in Toronto, Ontario, in the fall of 1987. The film's soundtrack, The Top of His Head, was written and composed by Fred Frith. Jane Siberry also contributed a song, "This Old Earth".

== Festival screenings ==
The film premiered in the Perspective Canada program at the 1989 Festival of Festivals. It later screened at the 51st Festival dei Popoli in Florence in 2010.

== Reception ==
=== Critical response ===
Filmdienst described the film as an ambitious comedy with existential elements. The review noted the film’s stylized audiovisual approach, particularly its use of television imagery and atmospheric music.

=== Awards and nominations ===
In 1989, the film won the Silver Plate Award at the Figueira da Foz Festival and was runner-up for Most Popular Film at the Vancouver International Film Festival. In addition to Jane Siberry's Best Original Song nomination, the film also received Genie Award nominations for Best Actor for Stephen Ouimette and Best Original Screenplay for Peter Mettler.
