= I Am a Good Person/I Am a Bad Person =

2011 film

i am a good person/i am a bad person
- Film poster
- Directed by: Ingrid Veninger
- Written by: Ingrid Veninger
- Produced by: Ingrid Veninger
- Starring: Hallie Switzer
- Cinematography: Ben Lichty
- Release date: September 10, 2011 (TIFF)
- Running time: 82 minutes
- Country: Canada
- Language: English

i am a good person/i am a bad person (Note: The film poster uses lower-case "i" for the title "i am a good person/i am a bad person". Reviews also use other capitalisations.) is a 2011 Canadian drama film written and directed by Ingrid Veninger. Veninger decided at short notice to make the film while on a trip to Europe to show another title, Modra. The film loosely incorporates aspects of Veninger's own life; the film within a film is called Modra as is Veninger's movie in real life. Veninger herself plays the lead character who is a filmmaker, like herself, and the filmmaker's daughter, Sara, is played by Veninger's real-life daughter Hallie Switzer.

== Plot ==
Filmmaker Ruby White (Ingrid Veninger) sets off on a European tour of her latest film, Headshots, taking her daughter Sara (Hallie Switzer) with her as her assistant. The first screening does not go well, playing to a nearly empty theatre. After Ruby goes out partying late at night, a disgruntled Sara decides to abandon their trip to Berlin to go stay with her cousin Lili in Paris.

In Berlin Ruby dresses herself in a bandage with fake blood in order to promote her film Headshots with limited success. While she is out for a drink, a stranger approaches her and asks if she is a good person or a bad person. Inspired by the comment Ruby makes a sign that on one side declares that she is a good person and on the other declares she is a bad person. Wandering in a park in Berlin she asks the question to various strangers she meets.

Meanwhile in Paris Sara confirms she is pregnant by her boyfriend and Skypes him with the news. She visits Père Lachaise Cemetery with an old actor friend of her mother's where she recounts that her mother was pregnant with her while filming in the cemetery and almost had a miscarriage. She then goes to get an infinity symbol tattoo.

At the Berlin screening of her film Ruby is again confronted with a near empty audience. In the pre-screening introduction to her film she reveals that she made the film because she is no longer in love with her husband and she hoped he would see the film and realize that.

At the Paris airport Sara calls her boyfriend and tells him that she is not ready to have a baby but that she does love him. She meets up with her mother in order to head home and sitting in their seats waiting for their flight to take off, the two women hold hands.

== Cast ==
- Ingrid Veninger as Ruby
- Simon Reynolds as Doug
- Jacob Switzer as Jake
- Hallie Switzer as Sara
- James Glyn as Bradford Greeter
- Benjamin Haller as Bradford Q&A Host
- Suzana Mikytova as Lili
- Mathieu Chesneau as Luke
