= Ingrid Veninger =

Canadian actress, film director and screenwriter

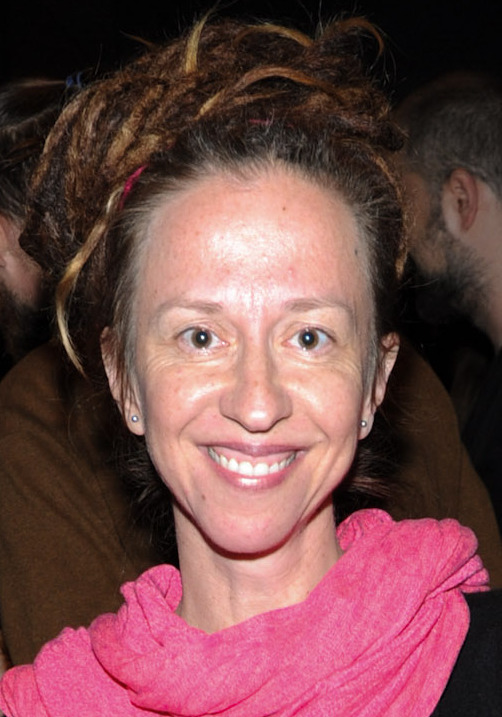
- Veninger in 2013
- Born: August 21, 1968 (age 58); Bratislava, Czechoslovakia
- Occupations: Actress, director, writer, producer
- Years active: 1980s–present
- Spouse: John Switzer

Ingrid Veninger (born August 21, 1968) is a Canadian actress, writer, director, producer, and film professor at York University. Veninger began her career in show business as a child actor in commercials and on television; as a teen, she was featured in the CBC series Airwaves (1986–1987) and the CBS series Friday the 13th: The Series (1987–1990). In the 1990s, she branched out into producing, and, in 2003, she founded her own production company, pUNK Films, through which she began to work on her own projects as a writer and director.

Veninger's directorial debut came in 2008, with the release of her low-budget feature film, titled Only, which cost $20,000 to produce. She has written and directed six features films—Only (2008), Modra (2010), i am a good person/i am a bad person (2011), The Animal Project (2013), He Hated Pigeons (2015), and Porcupine Lake (2017)—all of which have screened at film festivals around the world.

In 2011, she won the Toronto Film Critics Association's Jay Scott Prize for an emerging artist. In 2013, she won an EDA Award from the Alliance of Women Film Journalists at the Whistler Film Festival. The Globe and Mail has dubbed Veninger "The DIY Queen of Canadian Filmmaking".

== Early life ==
Veninger was born in Bratislava, before immigrating to Canada in the 1970s with her parents. Veninger got her start in show business in an advertisement for Bell Canada with Megan Follows at age 11.

== Career ==
=== 1980s–1990s ===
As a teen actress, Veninger appeared in a number of films and television series, including the CBC comedy-drama series Airwaves (1986–1987) and the popular horror series Friday the 13th: The Series (1987–1990).

In 1989, at the age of 21, Veninger branched out into producing by optioning the rights to Margaret Atwood's novel Cat’s Eye. She also worked as an assistant director on Atom Egoyan's The Adjuster (1991) and produced Jeremy Podeswa’s Gemini-nominated music documentary Standards (1992), and Peter Mettler's northern lights documentary Picture of Light (1994). As an actress, she has worked with Meryl Streep, Holly Hunter, Jackie Burroughs, among others.

=== 2000s ===
In 2000, after working for most of the 1990s as an actress (including a recurring role on the Canadian action series La Femme Nikita), Veninger attended the Canadian Film Centre, where she produced fellow student Julia Kwan’s award-winning short film, Three Sisters on Moon Lake (2001), which played at Sundance and the Toronto International Film Festival (TIFF).

In 2001, Veninger co-starred in the film On Her Knees with Anais Granofsky, who also directed. Both her and Granofsky appear in a full-frontal nude scene in the film; Veninger's vulva and pubic hair are visible in this scene.

In 2002, Veninger collaborated with Atom Egoyan and Peter Mettler, among others, on the Genie Award winning film, Gambling, Gods and LSD. In 2003, Veninger founded her production company, pUNK Films, and began to work on her own projects as a writer and director.

She is a frequent collaborator of Canadian filmmaker and actor Charles Officer, having worked on numerous projects with him, including the short film Urda/Bone, which screened at the New York Film Festival in 2003 and Nurse.Fighter.Boy (2008) which premiered at the 2008 Toronto International Film Festival. The short film was later picked up for distribution by Mongrel Media.

Veninger's directorial debut came in 2008, with the release of her low-budget indie film title Only, which screened at a number of local film festivals and cost only $20,000 to produce. Her young son, Jacob starred at the film's protagonist and Veninger appeared in a supporting role as his mother.

=== 2010s–present ===
Her second film, Modra, which is about returning to the Bratislava region and her home town of Modra, was produced in 2010, starring her daughter Hallie Switzer. MODRA was named by TIFF's Canada's Top Ten as one of the ten best Canadian films of 2010. Upon its release, The Globe and Mail dubbed Veninger "The DIY Queen of Canadian filmmaking".

Her third film i am a good person/i am a bad person (2011) was screened at the 2011 Toronto International Film Festival and prompted the Toronto Film Critics Association to award her the Jay Scott Prize for an emerging artist.

Her fourth film The Animal Project (2013) screened at numerous festivals, including in the Contemporary World Cinema section at the 2013 Toronto International Film Festival. The film received mostly positive reviews, with Norm Wilner of NOW Magazine writing that "the reigning queen of lo-fi Canadian cinema has upped her game without abandoning any of her characteristic whimsy". The Torontoist dubbed Veninger the "godmother of Toronto’s D.I.Y. filmmaking scene". The film is currently available for purchase on Vimeo.

In 2013, as she accepted an EDA Award from the Alliance of Women Film Journalists for The Animal Project at the Whistler Film Festival, Veninger asked the audience for help funding the Femmes Lab, a workshop she was spearheading to produce 6 female-directed feature films for $6,000. She said the $6,000 investment would not only fund six screenplays to be finished by June, it would guarantee the donor first look at the completed scripts. "The room was stone silent", recalled Veninger. Oscar-winning actress Melissa Leo ended up volunteering and put up the money, and the TIFF Bell Lightbox offered workshop space.

For her fifth feature film, He Hated Pigeons, Veninger raised over $36,000 from 175 backers on Indiegogo. After production, she toured with the film at numerous festivals around the world.

In 2017, Veninger's sixth film, Porcupine Lake, was screened in the Contemporary World Cinema section at the 2017 Toronto International Film Festival. The film was based on the script Veninger wrote through her Melissa Leo-funded Femmes Lab, and was also funded in part by Telefilm.

Veninger went into production on her seventh feature film on May 22, 2018, in Barcelona; the film is tentatively titled Before We Think and will be filmed in several different cities, including Whitehorse, Toronto, Wilmington, among others.

== Personal life ==
Veninger has been married to film composer John Switzer since 1990. They have two children: Hallie and Jacob, both artists.

In addition to filmmaking, Veninger works as a part-time contract faculty member at York University.

== Awards ==
- Genie Award for Best Documentary (Gambling, Gods and LSD) (2003)
- Audience Award, International (Modra), International Film Festival Bratislava (2010)
- Jay Scott Prize (i am a good person/i am a bad person), Toronto Film Critics Association Awards (2012)
- EDA Award, Narrative Feature Prize (The Animal Project), Alliance of Women Film Journalists (2013)

== See also ==
- List of female film and television directors
- List of LGBT-related films directed by women
