= Picture of Light =

- Directed by: Peter Mettler
- Written by: Peter Mettler
- Produced by: Peter Mettler; Alexandra Rockingham Gill
- Starring: Peter Mettler; Andreas Zuest
- Cinematography: Peter Mettler
- Edited by: Peter Mettler; Mike Munn; Alexandra Rockingham Gill
- Music by: Jim O'Rourke
- Distributed by: Grimthorpe Films
- Release date: 1994
- Running time: 83 minutes
- Countries: Canada; Switzerland
- Language: English
- Budget: $650,000

Picture of Light is a 1994 Canada-Switzerland poetic documentary film by Peter Mettler. It was filmed in Churchill, Manitoba on two trips in 1991 and again in 1992. It is one of the key films of the Toronto New Wave.

== Synopsis ==
Canadian/Swiss filmmaker Peter Mettler's goal of filming the Aurora Borealis, commonly known as the northern lights, is both a quest, a visual symphony and an extended metaphor. The journey begins with a train trip through the blustery snow scape from Winnipeg to Churchill, a community only accessible by rail or plane on the shores of Hudson Bay.

A five-member crew, including Mettler, who appears in the film and provides the voice-over commentary, along with eccentric Swiss meteorologist, Andreas Zuest, who financed the film, camps out in a local motel run by a Croat immigrant populated by an odd collection of rugged Churchillian residents while they wait for the conditions to be right to capture the notoriously difficult lights on film.

An intellectual travelogue, the film examines the gulf between the knowable and ineffable. It is a meditation on nature, technology and a visual postcard from a corner of the country few Canadians ever get to see for themselves. Mettler used time-lapse photography to capture the dancing lights, and among other things, had to work in conditions so extreme, the camera had to be protected against temperatures dropping to minus 40 Celsius.

== Reception ==
=== Critical response ===
"On one level, Picture of Light is a quintessential Canadian portrait of a natural world in extremis – a community surviving in a harsh land; a living, breathing, good-natured defiance of the elements; a frigid reminder of the necessity and futility of technology. It is also an examination of an elusive, fluid subject from different points of view. Essentially, the film is an accumulation of representations, or pictures of the lights, whether in language, photographic, or video images." (Tom McSorley)

=== Awards ===
- Toronto International Film Festival - selected as one of Canada's Essential 150 Films 2017
- Figueira da Foz Festival - Grand Prize – Images & Documents
- Locarno Film Festival - La Sarraz Prize
- Hot Docs International Film Festival - Best Film, Best Cinematography, Best Writing
- Canadian Independent Film Caucus Documentary Awards - Best Writing, Best Cinematography, Best Film – Science, Technology & Environment
- Swiss Art Awards, Federal Office of Culture - Award for Excellence in the Arts
- Yamagata International Documentary Film Festival - Award for Excellence
- San Francisco International Film Festival - Golden Gate Award
- Chicago International Film Festival - Certificate of Merit
