= Spare Me (film) =

- VHS box
- Directed by: Matthew Harrison
- Written by: Christopher Grimm
- Produced by: Madeline Warren
- Starring: Lawton Paseka; Christie MacFadyen
- Cinematography: Michael Mayers
- Edited by: Hughes Winborne
- Music by: Daniel Brenner; Hugh O’Donovan
- Release date: 1992
- Running time: 88 minutes
- Country: United States
- Language: English

Spare Me is a 1992 film directed by Matthew Harrison and starring Lawton Paseka and Christie MacFadyen. Harrison's feature film directorial debut, the 16mm feature was made for less than $80,000 US and won awards at the Rome Film Festival, New Orleans Film Festival, Long Island Film Festival and others. Harrison used the cash award from a prize at the Avignon Film Festival to make his second feature, the Sundance Jury Prize winning Rhythm Thief.

== Plot ==
This film is the story of Theo (Lawton Paseka), the "Bad Boy of Bowling", suspended from the pro-tour for bashing an opponent in the head on national TV. Desperate to circumvent the 100-year suspension and get back into the game, Theo seeks out his estranged father Buzz, a man of legendary power in the bowling world - a man he has never met.

But Buzz has turned to the dark side of the sport and runs an illegal dwarf bowling operation with his nefarious partner Miles Kastle. "And nobody sticks a finger into a bowling ball in this town without Miles Kastle knowing about it."

Kastle's pyromaniac daughter Sheila (Christie MacFadyen) has the hots for Theo. Her psychotic brother Junior has just broken out of a mental institution and wants to murder Buzz. Kastle offers to get Theo back in the pins - for a price, and Theo finds himself faced with one of the impossible 7-10 splits of life.

== Cast ==
- Lawton Paseka as Theo Skinner
- Christie MacFadyen as Sheila Kastle
- Mark Alfred as Buzz Fazeli
- Sunny Weil as Millie Fazeli
- Richard W. Sears Jr. as Miles Kastle
- Bill Christ as Junior
- Christopher Cooke as Sid
- Sean Hagerty as Breeze

== Festivals and critical reception ==
Candice Russell, writing for the Sun-Sentinel at the Fort Lauderdale Film Festival, called Spare Me “a warped version of Rebel Without a Cause.” At the XXXVI Mostra Internazionale Del Film D’Autore San Remo in Italy, film critic David Rooney, writing for Variety, made note of the film's "reckless energy and charismatic leads." and Fausto Serra wrote "[the film] marks a great starting point for the future of its author." Todd Anthony, reviewing the picture for the Miami New Times at the South Beach Film Festival, highlighted Spare Me as a "flat-out winner." Film Threat labeled the film “The quintessential saga of a rebel and his ball."

The film was also programmed at festivals both in the US and overseas including Boston Film Festival, Central Florida Film Festival, ExGround Festival, Florida Film Festival, Fort Lauderdale International Film Festival, the inaugural Hamptons International Film Festival, Long Island Film Festival, Filmfest Oldenburg, São Paulo International Film Festival, Festroia International Film Festival, Welsh Film Festival, and Women in Film Festival, Los Angeles.

Spare Me was screened at Anthology Film Archives, Cinemac, Cinémathèque Française, Coolidge Corner Theatre, Deutsche Kinemathek, Harvard Film Archive, Hirshhorn Museum, IFP Market, Kansas State University, Kino Arsenal at the Arsenal Institute for Film and Video Art in Berlin, Millennium Film Workshop, Pacific Film Archive, Projected Images of Hudson County, Putnam Screening Room and the Shooting Gallery in New York City. The film was licensed on video in the US and overseas.

On November 10, 2026 a 2K restoration of Spare Me, made from the original S16mm camera negative, was screened at the Southampton Playhouse. Grimm, Harrison, Paseka, and Warren were in attendance. The scan was made in preparation for 1080p Full HD streaming and release on Blu-ray Disc.
