= Scissere =

- Directed by: Peter Mettler
- Written by: Peter Mettler
- Produced by: Ron Repke; Peter Mettler; Alfred Mettler
- Starring: Greg Krantz; Natalie Olanick; Sandy MacFadyen; Anthony Downes
- Cinematography: Peter Mettler
- Edited by: Peter Mettler
- Music by: Peter Mettler
- Production company: Collaborative Effort
- Release date: September 13, 1982 (TIFF)
- Running time: 87 minutes
- Country: Canada
- Language: English

Scissere is a Canadian avant-garde drama film, written and directed by Peter Mettler and released in 1982. Made for a budget of just $20,000 as Mettler's student project for Ryerson University's film school, the film stars Greg Krantz as Bruno Scissere, a man who has just been released from a heroin rehabilitation clinic, who imagines himself inside the realities of three random people that he observes in a public transit station: a young mother (Natalie Olanick), an unrehabilitated drug addict (Sandy MacFadyen) and an entomologist (Anthony Downes).

The cast also includes Christie MacFadyen and Evan Siegel in smaller roles.

== Production ==
The film was produced by Collaborative Effort, an ad hoc film cooperative led by Mettler's Ryerson classmate Ron Repke.

== Release ==
The film premiered at the 1982 Toronto International Film Festival. It was subsequently screened at the Canadian Student Film Festival, where Mettler won the Norman McLaren Award for best film, as well as the awards for best soundtrack and best photography.

Although the film saw only limited commercial release following its initial film festival run, it has received periodic revival screenings, including at the Bloor Cinema in 1987, and in Mettler retrospectives at the Canadian Film Institute in 1997, and at the TIFF Lightbox in 2025.

== Critical response ==
Adele Freedman of The Globe and Mail wrote that "Scissere is experimental but it is not obscure. Mettler keeps a tight rein on his levels, giving the audience the choice of hanging on or walking out, which many did. Even the act of making an exit is in tune with the message of the film."

For Cinema Canada, Laurinda Hartt wrote that "the film is never silent. Under all the changing sounds of everyday life there is a constant rushing or roaring in our ears, like the aural equivalent of a continual life force, the quality of the roar changing with each change in environment. As the rhythmic human music had given way to the soft cry-ridden roar of the hospital, so does the hospital sound give way to the louder more insistent sound of the city: a nerve-jarring multi-engined roar that changes in intensity but never ceases."

At the time of the film's 1987 screening at the Bloor Cinema, Geoff Pevere wrote that "as the film expertly weaves from the observation to the manipulation of reality, the audience is placed in the driver's seat of a mind incapable of navigating the slim passage between thought and sensation. Needless to say, it's a difficult work. But, if you allow its images and nocturnal associations to take the lead, it can be a profoundly moving one."
