= Peter Mettler =

Canadian film director and cinematographer

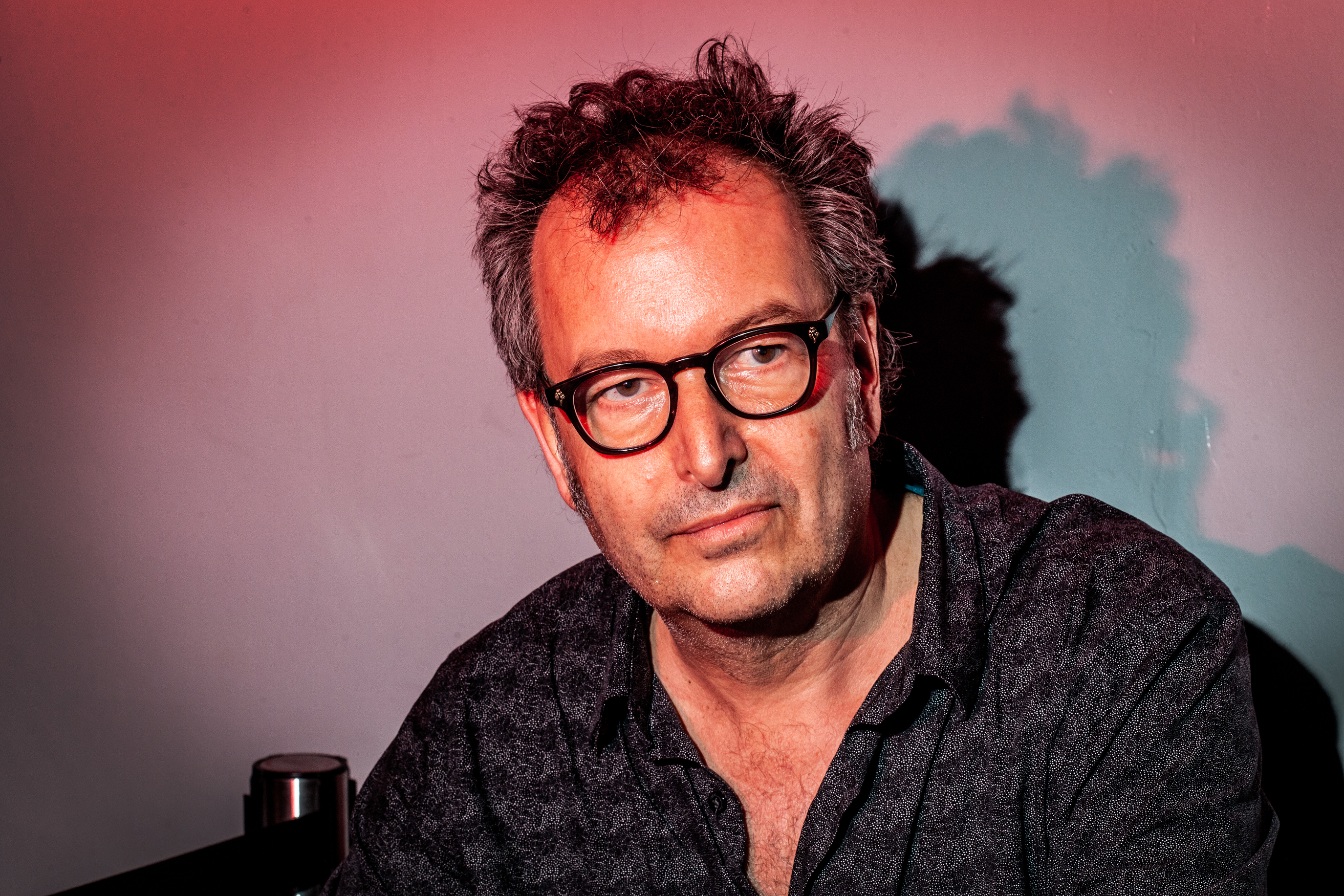
- Peter Mettler, 2013
- Born: Peter Mark Mettler; September 7, 1958 (age 67); Toronto, Ontario, Canada
- Occupations: Film director Cinematographer; Photographer
- Years active: 1976–present

Peter Mettler (born September 7, 1958) is a Swiss-Canadian film director and cinematographer. He is best known for his unique, intuitive approach to documentary, evinced by such films as Picture of Light (1994), Gambling, Gods and LSD (2002), and The End of Time (2012). "His peripatetic lens is ever gravitating toward outsiders in search of ecstatic states", writes José Teodoro in Brick, "strange spectacles that defy straightforward documentation, and sacred places that promise some metaphysical deliverance. There are precedents for his methodologies—the films of Chris Marker and Werner Herzog come to mind—but Mettler’s gifts as an open and unobtrusive interviewer and his capacity to discover shared sensibilities between people of vastly diverse cultures and creeds feels singular."

Mettler has worked as a cinematographer on films by Atom Egoyan, Patricia Rozema, Bruce McDonald, and Jennifer Baichwal, and has collaborated with numerous other artists, including Michael Ondaatje, Fred Frith, Jim O'Rourke, Jane Siberry, Robert Lepage, Edward Burtynsky, Greg Hermanovic, Richie Hawtin, Neil Young, Jeremy Narby, Franz Treichler and Emma Davie. Since 2005, Mettler has extended his artistic practice to the realm of live digital image-mixing, collaborating with a diverse array of musicians, dancers, poets, and multimedia artists in a wide range of locales, from theatres and cinemas to dance clubs and wilderness retreats.

Mettler was part of a loosely-affiliated group of filmmakers to emerge in the 1980s from Toronto known as the Toronto New Wave.

== Early life ==
Mettler was born in 1958 in Toronto, Ontario, where he was raised. His parents were Swiss immigrants. He made his first films at the age of sixteen before studying cinema at Ryerson Polytechnical Institute (1977-1982). While Mettler was at Ryerson, he spent summers loading cargo onto airplanes in Zürich. In the midst of his studies he took a year off to work at a heroin rehabilitation home in a repurposed twelfth-century Swiss monastery.

== Career ==
Scissere

Mettler's transformative experience at the heroin rehabilitation home provided the inspiration for his first feature Scissere (1982), "a narrative film that feels like an experimental piece, a collage of micro-tales of schizophrenia, addiction, study, and solitude", which he dedicated to Bruno Sciessere, one of the facility's patients. Scissere was the first student film included in the Toronto International Film Festival (formerly known as the Festival of Festivals), and later received the Norman McLaren Award at the Canadian Student Film Festival.

Eastern Avenue

Mettler followed Scissere with Eastern Avenue (1985), an intuitive travelogue diary: a form that would become a hallmark of his filmmaking style. With stops in Switzerland, Germany and Portugal, "the film presents a freely flowing series of impulsive, impressionistic images: urban and rural, artificial and natural". Throughout the 1980s, in addition to working on his own personal projects, Mettler would also collaborate as a cinematographer on several key films in the Toronto New Wave cinema, such as Atom Egoyan's early features Next of Kin (1984) and Family Viewing (1987).

The Top of His Head

Following Eastern Avenue, Mettler wrote and directed The Top of His Head (1989), a feature drama that follows a satellite salesman's "unexpected spiritual odyssey" after meeting a radical performance artist. As with Mettler's subsequent films, The Top of His Head explores the nature of human perception and technology's ability to liberate and enslave experience through the power of recording media. "The images are dazzling", writes Bruce Kirkland. "Forced telephoto perspectives on industrial wastelands jar the eye. Extreme close-ups turn a drop of water into a micro-universe." The film received three Genie Award nominations.

Tectonic Plates

In 1992, Mettler adapted the stage play Tectonic Plates by Robert Lepage, in collaboration with Lepage and Theatre Repère. Rather than document a performance or adapt the stage narrative into screen drama, the film, shot on location in Venice, Scotland, and Montreal, "seeks to articulate cinematically the intersections of theatre and cinema, past and present, culture and nature, interior and exterior, representation and reality". "The result", writes Vit Wagner in the Toronto Star, "is an intriguing and visually tantalizing collage that bridges the two media in a way that structurally underscores Lepage's themes of convergence, separation and transformation". The play is a series of vignettes that draw inspiration from the movement of geologic tectonic plates. This metaphor expanded Mettler's associative approach to narrative, which would be developed further in his later documentaries Picture of Light (1994), Gambling, Gods and LSD (2002), and The End of Time (2012).

Picture of Light

Picture of Light (1994), Mettler's "meditative, at times profoundly beautiful non-fiction adventure film", was made as a result of a chance meeting at a dinner party with the Swiss artist, collector and meteorologist Andreas Züst, who proposed that Mettler capture the aurora borealis on film. Mettler took up the challenge, braving arctic temperatures and constructing a special time-lapse camera system capable of operating in severe nighttime conditions during the film's photography in Churchill, Manitoba. A "beguiling and often breathtaking documentary about the meaning and mythology of the Northern Lights", Picture of Light laid the foundations for Mettler's exploratory essay style, and was widely acclaimed, winning numerous awards. In 2017, the film was one of eight Canadian classics screened at the Toronto International Film Festival as part of its celebration of Canada's sesquicentennial.

Balifilm, Krapp's Last Tape

Between Picture of Light and his next major project, the colossal Gambling, Gods and LSD, Mettler crafted the transfixing and elegant 28-minute Balifilm (1997). Weaving various images captured during travels in Indonesia with a soundtrack of Gamelan music, the film "may be the closest Mettler has come to a cinema of trance".

Mettler and Atom Egoyan reunited once more as cinematographer and director, respectively, for an adaptation of Samuel Beckett's monodrama Krapp's Last Tape (2000), which starred John Hurt, as part of the Beckett on Film series.

Gambling, Gods and LSD

Gambling, Gods and LSD (2002), an epic project some ten years in the making, is a three-hour long meditation on transcendence shot across three continents in a dizzying array of locations, including Toronto's airport strip, where Toronto Airport Fellowship Church congregates dance and swoon at an evangelical service, Las Vegas, where crowds gather to witness a demolition, Zürich, where addicts speak of their marginal existence, and southern India, where Mettler's approach to street life and worship becomes more observational. The final cut was derived from a 55-hour long assembly of unique footage, which Mettler said was like "composing a piece of music". "The finished film is long by conventional standards", wrote Cameron Bailey, "but it has the immersive feel of a great concert, or religious experience, or dream". Gambling, Gods and LSD received a Genie Award for Best Documentary.

Image Mixing

After Gambling, Gods and LSD, Mettler became interested in developing an improvisational approach to cinematic montage within a live context. Using material from his own films, including countless hours of outtakes and an immense personal trove of diaristic video, alongside a virtually unlimited range of found footage sources, Mettler creates audiovisual mixes through live improvisation, often accompanied by an improvising musician, such as Fred Frith, or a DJ, such as Biosphere. Since 2005, Mettler has worked with the software company Derivative to develop an ever-evolving image-mixing software platform. Mettler regards the work of image-mixing as a way of processing material in an image-saturated culture: "you're taking images that are coming at you from the world and making them your own. You're possessing the things that are bombarding you all the time." Mettler's image-mixing work has developed almost entirely in live, ephemeral contexts, but a "hallucinatory portal sequence" in The End of Time (2012) gives viewers a hint of some of the ways in which this work manifests. Most recently, Mettler has toured across Europe performing Yoshtoyoshto, a live event fusing image, story, and music produced in collaboration with anthropologist Jeremy Narby and musician Franz Treichler.

Manufactured Landscapes, Petropolis

Mettler served as cinematographer on Manufactured Landscapes (2006), director Jennifer Baichwal's documentary travelogue, essay film and portrait of Edward Burtynsky, the Canadian photographer famous for his large-format images of industrial landscapes and their impact on the environment and on human existence. Among the film's numerous international accolades was a Cinema Eye Honors Award nomination for Best Cinematography for Mettler.

Shot entirely from a helicopter, the Genie Award-nominated Petropolis: Aerial Perspectives on the Alberta Tar Sands (2009) found Mettler returning to a somewhat more experimental form, examining the titular subject, the world's largest industrial, capital and energy project, exclusively from a great distance and at a great height. Largely wordless, the film is at once bleak and wondrous, a study in both feats of industry and ecological malfeasance. "The object of the documentary isn't the vast domain of the oil sands, one visible from space and part of a post-terrestrial, post-human landscape", writes Georgiana Banita, "but something very human indeed, dependent on the viewers' ability to make sense, literally, of what they see on the surface of the earth, whose every mound and fracture the film painstakingly resisters". Jerry White in Cinema Scope wrote: "Like Mettler’s previous epics of exploration Gambling, Gods and LSD and Picture of Light, Petropolis is a work animated by the powerful desire to discover the unknown, and [...] by an equally powerful humility before the formidable challenges that this unknown throws up against our senses and the technology that seeks to extend those senses."

The End of Time, Broken Land

Mettler's 2012 film The End of Time drew upon the associative, essayistic techniques that defined both Picture of Light and Gambling, Gods and LSD as a means of exploring the elusive nature of time through science, art, history, anecdote and interview, and various ontologies and beliefs. Mettler visits numerous locales, such as CERN's Large Hadron Collider in Geneva, the site of the Detroit workshop where Henry Ford invented the Model-T, the home of a Hawaiian hermit untroubled by encroaching lava, and a Hindu funeral held near the alleged site of the Buddha's enlightenment. The End of Time, writes critic Adam Nayman, "exists in the twilight zone that is home to much of the best non-fiction filmmaking: at once rousing and sobering, baffling and precise, epic and intimate"." The film's final stop is Mettler's childhood home, where he visits his mother, then in her eighties, to ask about her sense of time's passage. Time is there to enjoy everything you possibly can, she says. “Is that the right answer?” Mettler closes the film on a note of ambiguity. "Like the scientists with whom and about whom he makes his films", writes scholar Jerry White in Of This Place and Elsewhere, "and like the philosophers who seem to be his constant companions, he is always open to the wonder of an unpredictable result".

Following The End of Time, Mettler served as cinematographer on Broken Land (2014), a documentary about life and migration along the Mexico-U.S. border, co-directed by Stéphanie Barbey and Luc Peter.

Becoming Animal

Shot entirely in Wyoming's Grand Teton National Park, Becoming Animal (2018), co-directed by Mettler and Emma Davie, is a dialogue with, rather than an adaptation of, ecologist and philosopher David Abram's eponymous book. Weaving images of wildlife and places where wilderness intersects with tourist culture, along with commentaries from Abram, Mettler and Davie, Becoming Animal observes the sensory relay between man, animal and the natural world and considers what's at stake when we forfeit our connection to nature. "Cinematographically beautiful", Ellen Lande writes, it "offers insights and observations into the philosophy of modern man and how far away from nature we have placed ourselves".

While the Green Grass Grows: A Diary in Seven Parts

Following Becoming Animal, Mettler embarked on an extended personal documentary project, shot between 2019 and 2021, structured as a cinematic diary combining family memoir, grief, and reflections on nature and mortality. Two of the film's seven parts were released in 2023 as a work-in-progress preview, While the Green Grass Grows (Parts 1&6), which premiered at Visions du Réel in Nyon, Switzerland, where it won the festival's Grand Jury Prize. The preview also received the Golden Dove at DOK Leipzig and the Grand Prix at the Rencontres internationales du documentaire de Montréal (RIDM), among other honours, generating funding and attention that allowed Mettler and Swiss producer maximage (Cornelia Seitler and Brigitte Hofer) to complete the full seven-part project.

The completed 420-minute film, While the Green Grass Grows: A Diary in Seven Parts (2025), premiered at the Toronto International Film Festival in September 2025. Shot on location in Switzerland, Canada, the United States, Spain and Cuba, the diary follows the deaths of Mettler's parents, the COVID-19 pandemic, and his own hospitalization for a sudden illness, alongside encounters with family, friends and collaborators such as anthropologist Jeremy Narby. Writing in POV Magazine, critic Pat Mullen called it arguably Mettler's most personal work, ranking it among his most rewarding films. The film won the Student Jury Award at the Jihlava International Documentary Film Festival in 2025.

== Filmography ==
=== Feature films ===
Year	Film	Notes	Awards
1982	Scissere	87 min. experimental narrative.	World Premiere in "New Directors/New Directions" at the Toronto Festival of Festivals (TIFF); Norman MacLaren Award, Best Canadian Student Film.; Nominated for Gold Hugo, Chicago International Film Festival
1985	Eastern Avenue	58 min. experimental travelogue.	World Premiere at Toronto International Film Festival
1989	The Top of His Head	110 min. feature drama.	Genie Award nomination for Best Original Screenplay; Silver Plate Award, Figueira da Foz Festival
1992	Tectonic Plates	104 min. feature drama, adaptation of the play by Robert Lepage.	Most Innovative Film of the Festival, Figuera da Foz; Catholic Jury Award, Mannheim Film Festival; Genie Award nomination for Best Achievement in Art Direction/Production Design; Christopher Columbus Award, Most Original and Creative of the Festival, Columbus International Film & Video Festival, Columbus, Ohio.
1994	Picture of Light	83 min. feature documentary.	Best Film, Best Cinematography, & Best Writing, Hot Docs Canadian International Film Festival, Toronto; La Sarraz Prize, Locarno International Film Festival; Award for Excellence in the Arts, Swiss Ministry of Culture; Grand Prize (Images & Documents), Figueira da Foz International Festival; Best Ontario Feature, Sudbury Cinefest; Runner-Up Prize, Yamagata International Documentary Festival.; Nominee for Robert and Frances Flaherty Prize, Yamagata International Documentary Festival; Golden Gate Award, San Francisco International Film Festival
2002	Gambling, Gods and LSD	180 min. feature documentary.	Genie Award - Best Documentary, Academy of Canadian Cinema and Television; Grand Prix & Prix du Publique, Visions du Reèl (Nyon, France); NFB Best Feature Documentary, Vancouver International Film Festival; NFB Best Documentary, Festival du Nouveau Cinema (Montreal); 3SAT Prize for Best Documentary at Duisburger Filmwoche; "Top Twenty Canadian Films", Toronto International Film Festival; Award for Excellence in the Arts, Swiss Ministry of Culture
2009	Petropolis: Aerial Perspectives on the Alberta Tar Sands	43 min. documentary, co-produced by Greenpeace Canada.	Prix du Jury du Jeune Publique, Visions du Réel (Nyon, France); Fondazione Ente dello Spettacolo Prize, Festival dei Popoli.; Nominated: Genie Award for Best Short Documentary; CPH:DOX New Vision Award Nominee
2012	The End of Time	114 min. feature documentary.	Premio Qualita di Vita Award, Locarno International Film Festival; Golden Leopard Nominee, Locarno International Film Festival; “Canada’s Top Ten",Toronto International Film Festival; Nominated for DOX:AWARD, CPH:DOX; Nominated for Best Screenplay, Vancouver Film Critics Circle; Nominated for Best Documentary, Music, Camera, Swiss Film Prize Nominations.; Nominated: Best World Documentary, Jihlava International Documentary Film Festival.
2018	Becoming Animal	78 min. feature documentary.	Nominated for Fugas Feature Film Competition, Documenta Madrid; Nominated for Grand Prix, Docs Against Gravity; Nominated for Best Feature, Bildrausch Filmfest; Nominated for Best Feature Documentary, Edinburgh International Film Festival; Nominated for Best Testimony on Nature, Jihlava International Documentary Film Festival; Nominated for DOX:AWARD, CPH:DOX; Official Selection – Masters, International Documentary Film Festival Amsterdam (IDFA)
2023	While the Green Grass Grows: Parts 1&6	166 min. preview of two parts from While the Green Grass Grows: A Diary in Seven Parts.	World Premiere, Visions du Réel; Grand Jury Prize, Visions du Réel; Golden Dove, DOK Leipzig; Grand Prix, Rencontres internationales du documentaire de Montréal (RIDM)
2025	While the Green Grass Grows: A Diary in Seven Parts	420 min. feature documentary.	World Premiere, Toronto International Film Festival; Winner, Student Jury Award, Jihlava International Documentary Film Festival

=== Short films ===
- Reverie (1976), 20 minutes.
- Lancalot Freely (1980), 20 minutes.
- Gregory (1980), 25 minutes.
- Balifilm (1997), 30 minutes. Best Short Film, Duisburger Filmwoche.
- Away (2007), 3 minutes. Co-produced by the National Film Board of Canada.
- Trace of the future (2014), 3 minutes. Produced by Visions du Réel, to celebrate the festival's twentieth anniversary.

=== Cinematography (selected) ===
- Open House (1982), directed by Atom Egoyan.
- Next of Kin (1984), directed by Atom Egoyan.
- David Roche Talks to You About Love (1985), directed by Jeremy Podeswa.
- Knock Knock (1985), directed by Bruce McDonald.
- Passion A Letter in 16mm (1985), directed by Patricia Rozema.
- Family Viewing (1987), directed by Atom Egoyan.
- Artist on Fire (1987), directed by Kay Armatage, with Joyce Wieland.
- Leda and the Swan (1997), directed by Alexandra Rockingham Gill.
- Krapp's Last Tape (2000), directed by Atom Egoyan.
- Manufactured Landscapes (2006), directed by Jennifer Baichwal. Also credited as creative consultant.
- Into the Night (2006), directed by Annette Mangaard.
- National Parks Project: Gros Morne (2009), directed by Ryan J. Noth. Series pilot.
- Broken Land (2014), directed by Stephanie Barbie & Luc Peter. Also credited as artistic collaborator.
