= Tracy Wright =

Canadian actress

- Born: December 7, 1959; Toronto, Ontario, Canada
- Died: June 22, 2010 (aged 50); Toronto, Ontario, Canada
- Occupation: Actress
- Years active: 1989–2010
- Spouse: Don McKellar (m. 2010)

Tracy Wright (December 7, 1959 – June 22, 2010) was a Canadian actress who was known for her stage and film performances, as well as her presence in Canada's avant-garde for over 20 years.

== Career ==
In 1989, she was a founding member of the Toronto's Augusta Company, along with her future husband Don McKellar and Daniel Brooks, and worked regularly throughout her theatre career with Brooks, McKellar, and Canadian writers and directors including Nadia Ross, Jacob Wren, Daniel MacIvor, Hillar Liitoja, Paul Bettis, and Sky Gilbert.

In film, she worked closely with McKellar and Bruce McDonald whose Highway 61 (1991) was one of her first major film roles; McDonald's This Movie Is Broken and Trigger (both released in 2010) were her last films. She was also known for her roles in films such as Wasaga (1994), When Night Is Falling (1995), Last Night (1998), Elimination Dance (1998), Superstar (1999), Me and You and Everyone We Know (2005), Monkey Warfare (2006), and You Are Here (2010). Highlights of her television appearances include The Kids in the Hall and Twitch City.

Wright also acted in Bob Wiseman's video "We Got Time" in 1989, along with Leslie Spit Treeo and McKellar, and she is the subject of a song by Wiseman, entitled "Mothfaceyahoo.ca" from his 2013 release Giulietta Masina at the Oscars Crying.

Country singer-songwriter John Borra also released a tribute song to Wright, "Trace in the Wind".

== Awards ==
Following her death, Wright and her Trigger co-star Molly Parker jointly won the prize for Best Actress at the 2011 ACTRA Toronto Awards. McKellar accepted the award in her honour, stating in his speech that the award "means more to me than any I've ever won". Wright and Parker were also both nominated for the Genie Award for Best Actress at the 31st Genie Awards.

== Personal life ==
Wright was married to McKellar, her long-term partner, from January 2010 until her death in June of that year.

She died on June 22, 2010, aged 50, from pancreatic cancer.

== Filmography ==
=== Film ===
Year	Title	Role	Notes
1991	Highway 61	Margo	
1992	Blue		
1994	Eclipse	Souvenir Shop Clerk	
1995	When Night Is Falling	Tory	
1995	Wasaga	Judy	
1996	My Summer Vacation	Marvette	
1996	Bubbles Galore	Vivian Klitorsky	
1996	Joe's So Mean to Josephine	Dispatcher	
1998	Last Night	Donna	
1998	Elimination Dance		
1998	Dog Park	Dog Psychologist's Wife	
1999	The Five Senses	Alex	
1999	Superstar	Sister Anne	
2000	Apartment Hunting	Steve	
2001	Picture Claire	Detective Sweeney	
2004	Childstar	Tabitha	
2005	Me and You and Everyone We Know	Nancy Herrington	
2006	Monkey Warfare	Linda	
2007	All Hat	Elizabeth Dokes	
2008	Blindness	Thief's Wife	
2008	Green Door	Rhonda	
2009	Leslie, My Name Is Evil	Leslie's Mom	
2010	This Movie Is Broken	Box Office Woman	
2010	You Are Here	The Archivist	
2010	Trigger	Vic	

=== Television ===
Year	Title	Role	Notes
1991	The Kids in the Hall	Sandra	Episode #2.14
1995	Liberty Street	Justice of Peace	2 episodes
1996	Dangerous Offender: The Marlene Moore Story	Spot	Television film
1997	Inspired by Bach	Emily	Episode: "Sarabande"
1998, 2000	Twitch City	Dizelle	2 episodes
2001	Dice	Gil	6 episodes
2005	Slings & Arrows	Director #2	Episode: "Rarer Monsters"
