= Toronto New Wave =

Group of filmmakers from Toronto during the 1980s and early 1990s

- Years active: 1980s to late 1990s
- Location: Canada
- Major figures: Atom Egoyan, Ron Mann, John Greyson, Bruce McDonald, Don McKellar, Peter Mettler, Jeremy Podeswa, Patricia Rozema, Camelia Frieberg, Alexandra Raffé, Colin Brunton
- Influences: David Cronenberg, documentary film, Canadian cinema

The Toronto New Wave refers to a loose-knit group of filmmakers from Toronto who came of age during the 1980s and early 1990s.

== History ==
Atom Egoyan, John Greyson, Ron Mann, Bruce McDonald, Don McKellar, Peter Mettler, Jeremy Podeswa and Patricia Rozema, along with producers Camelia Frieberg, Alexandra Raffé, Colin Brunton, Janis Lundman and others came bursting on to the Canadian movie scene in the 1980s with fresh, original films that rejected not only Hollywood's formulaic dramas, but also the legacy of earlier English-Canadian cinéastes (such as Don Shebib and Don Owen), who had made downbeat films about heartbreak and loss.

Feature filmmaking in Ontario in the 1980s may stand as one of the most significant developments in the history of this country's cinema. Leading the way into features was Peter Mettler (whose 1982 film Scissere became the first student feature programmed by the Toronto Festival of Festivals, now the Toronto International Film Festival) and Mann (with two exceptional documentaries – Imagine the Sound in 1981 and Poetry in Motion in 1982). Egoyan followed in 1984 with Next of Kin, a fictional comic feature about identity.

Many of the young filmmakers (they were all under the age of 30) worked on each other's films. Mettler shot Egoyan's Next of Kin and Family Viewing (1987), Rozema's Passion: A Letter in 16mm (1985), Podeswa's Nion in the Kabaret de La Vita (1986) and McDonald's Knock! Knock! (1985), while McDonald edited Scissere, Egoyan's Family Viewing and Speaking Parts (1989), and Mann's Comic Book Confidential (1988). McDonald also guest-edited the October 1988 "Outlaw Edition" of Cinema Canada that first publicized the existence of this new group of filmmakers. Despite the lack of a defining manifesto, the Toronto-based group existed through a close-knit sense of cooperation of a kind rarely seen in Canada since the growth of Quebec cinema in the early sixties.

Two major events of the 1980s gave credence and cash to these young Toronto filmmakers. In 1984, the Toronto Festival of Festivals held the largest retrospective of Canadian films ever programmed in Canada. This event premiered Perspective Canada, a Festival series that for 20 years was the most prestigious venue for launching English-Canadian features. Then, in 1986, the Ontario Film Development Corporation (OFDC) was founded, providing a much-needed funding alternative to the restrictions of the Ontario Arts Council and Telefilm Canada in Montreal. From the start, the OFDC was officially mandated to create an Ontario film culture. Under the guidance of its first CEO, Wayne Clarkson (who, as the former head of the Festival of Festivals, had been partially responsible for launching Perspective Canada), it proceeded to do so.

The breakthrough came in 1987 when Rozema's first low-budget feature, I've Heard the Mermaids Singing, won the Prix de la Jeunesse at the Cannes Film Festival. The film, and Rozema herself, received a tremendous amount of international press attention and Mermaids did something almost unheard of for an English-Canadian film: it made money at the box office. In the same year, Montreal's Festival du Nouveau Cinéma famously concluded with Wim Wenders publicly reassigning the first-place prize money from his Wings of Desire to Egoyan, whose Speaking Parts had received a special mention. A number of key New Wave films followed in the wake this stunning successes: Egoyan's The Adjuster (1991) and Exotica (which won the International Critics' Prize at Cannes in 1994); McDonald's Roadkill (1989) and Highway 61 (1991), both written by and starring McKellar; Greyson's Zero Patience (1994); and Mettler's The Top of His Head (1989) and Tectonic Plates (1992).

In 1992, Geoff Pevere wrote a piece for retrospective of Canadian cinema that took place at the Georges Pompidou Centre in Paris ("Middle of Nowhere: Ontario Movies after 1980," which was reprinted in Post Script in 1995). In it he described this "Ontario New Wave" as "one of the most vital and productive booms in the history of the country's cinema" and a major "semantic reversal" that saw the artistic heart of Canadian filmmaking shift from Quebec to Ontario during the 1980s. Cameron Bailey explored this notion deeper in an article for a Special Issue of Take One: Film in Canada, Summer 2000 (devoted to the history of filmmaking in Ontario) entitled "Standing in the Kitchen All Night: A Secret History of the Toronto New Wave," and later, Bailey's article was the basis for Brenda Longfellow's article (published in Toronto on Film): "Surfacing the Toronto New Wave: Policy, Paradigm Shifts and Post-Nationalism."

== Style ==
Far from representing the culmination of Ontario's seemly long-standing attempts at establishing itself as a viable production centre for big-budget commercial features made in North America, the most important films from the 1980s and early 1990s represented a reaction to and a break from this commercial model. The films of Toronto's New Wave were almost all low-budget, independent productions made for less than $1 million. Taking the Canadian cinema's essential themes of identity and alienation, Toronto's New Wave films offered an image of the province as a place of deep-rooted yearning and detachment, where the absence of a strong sense of identity and the quest for an identity is an identifying characteristic in itself.

Unlike previous generations, this group of filmmakers avoided the easy lure of big money and bigger films in Hollywood. Instead, like their cinematic mentor David Cronenberg, they chose to stay and make a living in Canada, thus contributing greatly to the ongoing development of an indigenous film culture. However, project funding from the OFDC came to an end in 1996 with the 1995 election of Mike Harris's Conservatives, and one of the most creative and innovative periods in Canadian filmmaking history came to an abrupt end.

== Key films ==
1981

- Imagine the Sound (Ron Mann)

1982

- Poetry in Motion (Mann)
- Scissere (Peter Mettler)

1984

- Next of Kin (Atom Egoyan)

1986

- Dancing in the Dark (Leon Marr)

1987

- Family Viewing (Egoyan)
- I've Heard the Mermaids Singing (Patricia Rozema)
- A Winter Tan (Jackie Burroughs, John Frizzell, Louise Clark, Aerlyn Weissman & John Walker)

1988

- Milk and Honey (Glenn Salzman & Rebecca Yates)
- Comic Book Confidential (Mann)
- Urinal (John Greyson)

1989

- Speaking Parts (Egoyan)
- The Top of His Head (Mettler)
- Roadkill (Bruce McDonald; written by Don McKellar)

1990

- White Room (Rozema)

1991

- The Events Leading Up to My Death (Bill Robertson)
- The Adjuster (Egoyan)
- Masala (Srinivas Krishna)
- Sam & Me (Deepa Mehta)
- Highway 61 (McDonald; written with McKellar)

1992

- Tectonic Plates (Mettler)

1993

- I Love a Man in Uniform (David Wellington)
- Calendar (Egoyan)
- Thirty Two Short Films About Glenn Gould (François Girard; written by Girard and McKellar)
- Zero Patience (Greyson)

1994

- Exotica (Egoyan)
- Picture of Light (Mettler)
- Dance Me Outside (McDonald)
- Eclipse (Jeremy Podeswa)

1995

- Rude (Clement Virgo)
- When Night Is Falling (Rozema)
- Blood & Donuts (Holly Dale)
- Curtis's Charm (John L'Ecuyer)

1996

- Hard Core Logo (McDonald)
- Lilies (Greyson)
- Lulu (Krishna)
- Joe's So Mean to Josephine (Peter Wellington)
