= Earl Pastko =

American actor

Earl Pastko is a Canadian-American actor known for his roles in theatre, film and television.

== Early life ==
Pastko was born and raised in Chicago and moved to Canada in 1985. He currently resides in Toronto.

== Career ==
Pastko is a founding member of Chicago's Remains Theater Company. He worked extensively in theatre with noted directors Ken McDougall, Paul Bettis, Alexander Hausvater, Brian Quirt, Vikki Anderson and Morris Panych, among others. Pastko received a Dora nomination for his performance in La Ronde and a Jessie nomination for The Ends of The Earth. His most recent stage appearances were as Lars in The Company Theatre's production of Festen and as Alexander Stern in The Rant, presented by Chicago's Mary Arrcher Theatre Co.

His best known film roles are as Satan in Bruce McDonald's Highway 61; a bartender in Battlefield Earth; as Hartley Otis in Atom Egoyan's The Sweet Hereafter; as the artist in Jeremy Podeswa's Eclipse; and the hotel detective in David Weaver's Century Hotel. Pastko worked with George A. Romero (Land of the Dead); Eugene Levy (Sodbusters); and Roger Christian (Masterminds and Battlefield Earth).

Pastko's television appearances include Street Justice, Highlander, Street Legal, Kung Fu, Lonesome Dove, Poltergeist, Lexx, Stargate, La Femme Nikita, Once A Thief, The Eleventh Hour, This Is Wonderland, Zixx, Living in Your Car and The Murdoch Mysteries.

== Filmography ==
=== Film ===
Year	Title	Role	Notes
1989	Roadkill	Children of Paradise drums	
1990	Defy Gravity	Vost	
1991	Highway 61	Mr. Skin	
1994	Eclipse	Michael	
1994	Soft Deceit	Bookstore Owner	
1995	Jungleground	Louis Brising	
1995	Blood and Donuts	Donut Shop Junkie	
1997	The Sweet Hereafter	Hartley	
1997	Masterminds	Captain Jankel	
1998	Dog Park	Bartender	
1998	Motel	Louie	
2000	Rats	Demented Man	
2000	Battlefield Earth	Bartender	
2001	Century Hotel	Hotel Detective	
2004	Shelf Life	Old Man	
2005	Land of the Dead	Roach	
2005	God's Baboons	Michael	
2006	Monkey Warfare	Ted	
2008	Head of Raven Clan	Eli Perla	
2011	The Mountie	Olaf	
2013	Cottage Country	Vagrant	
2013	The Colony	Scientist	
2015	Manhattan Undying	Dr. Wilkins	
2018	Birdland	Bob McIntyre	

=== Television ===
Year	Title	Role	Notes
1990	Friday the 13th: The Series	Merv	Episode: "Jack-in-the-Box"
1991	Street Legal	Pigpen Rodnicki	3 episodes
1992	The Ray Bradbury Theater	Tom Carmody	Episode: "The Jar"
1993	Highlander: The Series	Victor Paulus	Episode: "Band of Brothers"
1993	Gross Misconduct: The Life of Brian Spencer	Bartender	Television film
1993	Street Justice	Deputy Otis	Episode: "My Brother's Keeper"
1994	Heads	Lloyd Hubbs	Television film
1994	Sodbuster	Butch	Television film
1994	Forever Knight	Miklos	2 episodes
1994	The Adventures of Dudley the Dragon	Vernon the Toxin	Episode: "Dudley and the Toxin"
1995	Kung Fu: The Legend Continues	Ramsden	Episode: "Cruise Missiles"
1995	Lonesome Dove: The Series	Joe Leedskall	Episode: "Day of the Dead"
1996	Poltergeist: The Legacy	John Harper	Episode: "The Twelfth Cave"
1996	Goosebumps	Count Nightwing	Episode: "Vampire Breath"
1997	Once a Thief	Harvey Stone	Episode: "Mac Daddy"
1998	La Femme Nikita	Field	Episode: "Hard Landing"
1999	Lexx	Brizon	Episode: "Brizon"
2001	Stargate SG-1	Colonel Alexi Zukhov	Episode: "The Tomb"
2001	MythQuest	Tailor / Gorgos	2 episodes
2005	Puppets Who Kill	Bill Collector	Episode: "Cuddles the Manchurian Candidate"
2005	Premonition	Vargas	Television film
2005	Air Crash Investigation	Hamdi Taha	Episode: "Death and Denial"
2007	The Dresden Files	Head of Raven Clan	Episode: "Birds of a Feather"
2008	Little Mosque on the Prairie	Leon	Episode: "Let Prairie Dogs Lie"
2012	Murdoch Mysteries	Senor Arturo	Episode: "Murdoch at the Opera"
2015	Orphan Black	Bulldog	3 episodes
2015	Hemlock Grove	Shandor Bibinkian	2 episodes
2019	Frankie Drake Mysteries	Armando Petrillo	Episode: "A Sunshine State of Mind"
