= Leonard Farlinger =

Canadian film director, producer and screenwriter

Leonard Farlinger is a Canadian film director, producer, and screenwriter. Farlinger and his wife, Jennifer Jonas, are partners in the production firm New Real Films.

== Early career ==
In 1990, Farlinger completed the Cineplex Entertainment Film Program (Directors' Lab) at the Canadian Film Centre.

== Film producer ==
As producer, Farlinger's credits include Gerontophilia, directed by Bruce LaBruce; Trigger, directed by Bruce McDonald and named one of Toronto International Film Festival's top ten films of the year; Leslie, My Name Is Evil; Otto, or Up With Dead People; and Monkey Warfare, directed by Reginald Harkema, which won a Special Jury Prize at the Toronto International Film Festival (TIFF) in 2006. Farlinger's latest film as a producer is Born to Be Blue, directed by Robert Budreau and starring Ethan Hawke, Carmen Ejogo, and Callum Keith Rennie.

== Screenwriter and director ==
Farlinger's first feature film as writer/director, The Perfect Son, starring Colm Feore and David Cubitt, was nominated for two Best Actor Genies and premiered at the Toronto International Film Festival. He also directed the feature film All Hat, starring Luke Kirby and Rachael Leigh Cook, which premiered at TIFF. He directed the Gemini-winning movie-of-the-week In The Dark, starring Kathleen Robertson. Farlinger wrote and directed the comedy, I'm Yours, which premiered at the Toronto International Film Festival and starred Karine Vanasse, Rossif Sutherland, and Don McKellar.

Farlinger's next projects are the feature film Mr. Epiphany, written by Matt Watts, and a film based on Farlinger's own script, The Truth About Lying.

== Personal life ==
Farlinger married producer Jennifer Jonas. They have two children, including actress Ella Jonas Farlinger.

== Filmography ==
Producer

- Odyssey in August - 1989
- Kumar and Mr. Jones - 1991
- Monkey Warfare - 2006
- Otto; or Up with Dead People - 2008
- Leslie, My Name Is Evil - 2009
- Hungry Hills - 2009
- Trigger - 2010
- The Resurrection of Tony Gitone - 2012
- Gerontophilia - 2013
- Born to Be Blue - 2015
- The Wall Street Boy (Kipkemboi) - 2023
- Seeds - 2024

Director

- Collateral Damage - 1993, short
- The Perfect Son - 2000
- In the Dark - 2003, television
- All Hat - 2007
- I'm Yours - 2011

Writer

- Kicking Blood - 2021
