= Patricia Rozema =

Canadian film director, writer and producer

- Rozema in 2026
- Born: 20 August 1958 (age 68); Kingston, Ontario, Canada
- Occupations: Film director, writer, producer, editor
- Years active: 1985–present
- Children: 2

Patricia Rozema (born 20 August 1958) is a Canadian film director, writer and producer. She was part of a loosely-affiliated group of filmmakers who emerged in the 1980s from Toronto, Canada, known as the Toronto New Wave.

== Early life ==
Rozema was born in Kingston, Ontario and raised in Sarnia, Ontario. Her parents, Jacoba Berandina (née Vos) and Jan Rozema, were Dutch Calvinists. Television was severely restricted and she did not go to a movie theatre until she was 16 years old. Rozema studied philosophy and English literature at Calvin College in Michigan.

== Film career ==
After a brief stint as a print and then television journalist (CBC Television's The Journal), Rozema directed her first feature, I've Heard the Mermaids Singing (1987), a serious comedy starring Sheila McCarthy about a loner named Polly who is an art gallery secretary and aspiring photographer. At the 1987 Cannes Film Festival, I've Heard the Mermaids Singing won the Prix de la Jeunesse. In 1993, the Toronto International Film Festival ranked it ninth in the Top 10 Canadian Films of All Time, with Rozema becoming the first female director to have a film on the list. The film did not appear on the updated 2004 version.

In 1990, Rozema directed White Room, a neo-noir starring McCarthy, Kate Nelligan, Margot Kidder, and Maurice Godin. Writing in The Washington Post, Rita Kempley described it as "a suburban gothic fairy tale, a work of dark, conflicted magic that might have been cut from Blue Velvet by Edward Scissorhands." Rozema also directed the Six Gestures (part of the Yo-Yo Ma Inspired by Bach television series), which combined images of Yo-Yo Ma performing with skating sequences by Jane Torvill and Christopher Dean, interwoven with J.S. Bach's first-person narrative. Six Gestures was nominated for a Grammy and won an Emmy Award for Outstanding Classical Music-Dance Program, as well as a Golden Rose, the top television award in Europe. She then directed the romance film When Night Is Falling in 1995 starring Pascale Bussières and Rachael Crawford, and featuring Don McKellar and Tracy Wright.

Rozema's next two feature films were made outside Canada; Mansfield Park (1999) is a revisionist adaptation of Jane Austen's novel of that name. Happy Days (2000), an Irish production, is a film version of Samuel Beckett's humorously despairing play in which a woman lives partially buried in a mound of sand.

She later directed and ghost-wrote Kit Kittredge: An American Girl (2008), which was based on the American Girl book series. The film earned Rozema a Directors Guild of Canada Award nomination for Best Director.

Rozema's television credits include the pilot and two subsequent episodes of the HBO series Tell Me You Love Me (2008), an episode of the HBO series In Treatment (2010), and episodes of the Canadian television sitcom Michael, Tuesdays and Thursdays, which premiered on CBC Television in fall 2011. She most recently worked as a director on the Amazon series Mozart in the Jungle and the Netflix series Sex/Life.

Rozema and co-writer Michael Sucsy received an Emmy Award nomination (Outstanding Writing for a Miniseries, Movie or a Dramatic Special), a Writers Guild of America Award nomination (Long Form – Original) and a PEN USA Award nomination in Screenplay for the HBO movie Grey Gardens (2009).

Her feature film Into the Forest, starring Elliot Page and Evan Rachel Wood, premiered at the Toronto International Film Festival in September 2015.

In 2017, Rozema founded her own production company, Crucial Things, to co-produce Mouthpiece (2018), which was premiered at TIFF. The film is an adaptation of a two-woman play of the same name, created and performed by Norah Sadava and Amy Nostbakken, who also star in the film. Sadava and Nostbakken play dual versions of the same female protagonist, who struggles to find her voice while writing her mother's eulogy. A profile of Rozema in the Globe & Mail called it "her most directly political film" and added that "it also may be her most heartfelt and emotionally mature."

== Personal life ==
Rozema is openly lesbian and has two children with her former partner, film composer Lesley Barber.

== Filmography ==
Short film

Year	Title	Director	Writer	Notes
1985	Passion: A Letter in 16 mm	Yes	No	Also producer
1986	Urban Menace	Yes	No	
1991	Desperanto	Yes	Yes	Segment of Montreal Stories
1997	The Shape I Think	Yes	No	
2000	This Might Be Good	Yes	Yes	

Feature film

Year	Title	Director	Writer	Producer
1987	I've Heard the Mermaids Singing	Yes	Yes	Yes
1990	White Room	Yes	Yes	Executive
1995	When Night Is Falling	Yes	Yes	No
1995	Curtis's Charm	No	No	Executive
1999	Mansfield Park	Yes	Yes	No
2008	Kit Kittredge: An American Girl	Yes	No	No
2015	Women Who Act	No	No	Executive
2015	Into the Forest	Yes	Yes	No
2018	Mouthpiece	Yes	Yes	Yes

Television

Year	Title	Director	Writer	Executive producer	Notes
1996	The Hunger	Yes	Yes	No	Episode: "At My Back I Always Hear"
1997	Inspired by Bach	Yes	Yes	No	Episode: "Six Gestures"
2000	Happy Days	Yes	No	No	TV movie
2003	A Wrinkle in Time	No	No	Yes	TV movie
2007	Tell Me You Love Me	Yes	No	Yes	Episodes: "Pilot", "Episode 2", and "Episode 3"
2009	Grey Gardens	No	Yes	No	TV movie
2010	In Treatment	Yes	No	No	Episode: "Frances – Week 3"
2011	Michael: Every Day	Yes	No	No	Episodes: "Being Alone", "Ridicule", and "Sweating"
2016	Mozart in the Jungle	Yes	No	No	Episodes: "My Heart Opens to Your Voice" and "Avventura Romantica"
2017	Anne with an E	Yes	No	No	Episode: "Tightly Knotted to a Similar String"
2021	Sex/Life	Yes	No	No	Episodes: "The Wives Are in Connecticut" and "Down in the Tube Station at Midnight"

== Awards ==
- Second prize at the Chicago International Film Festival for her short Passion: A Letter in 16 mm.
- I've Heard the Mermaids Singing won the Prix de la Jeunesse at Director's Fortnight in Cannes and was nominated for Best Picture – with Rozema garnering nominations Best Director and Best Screenplay – at the 9th Genie Awards in 1988. The film received 17 further awards. It is listed as one of the Best Canadian Films of All Time by the International Film Critics association.
- White Room earned 4 prizes, and 3 Genie nominations.
- When Night Is Falling premiered in competition in the 45th Berlin International Film Festival and went on to win over 30 awards from different countries and at various gay and lesbian film festivals.
- Yo-Yo Ma, Inspired by Bach Rozema's episode "Six Gestures" won a Prime Time Emmy Award and was nominated for a Grammy. (other contributors included Atom Egoyan)

== See also ==
- List of female film and television directors
- List of lesbian filmmakers
- List of LGBT-related films directed by women
