= Peter Kambasis =

Canadian-born writer/director

Peter Kambasis (born 22 September 1974) is a Canadian-born writer / director / song writer.

== Film School ==
He graduated from Ryerson University (Toronto, Ontario, Canada) in June 1999, where he received his Bachelor of Applied Arts in Film Production. It was there that he began to produce short film projects primarily for the internet.

Before graduating, Peter had won Best Fiction Film at the Student Film and Video Festival in Montreal 1998 for his short film It's Not Easy Being Greek.

== Post-Production Sound ==
After working for numerous internet providers, he landed work at a Post-Production Sound Company called Trackworks Inc., where he worked as an Editing Assistant, and eventually, Sound Editor. There he worked with such directors as Atom Egoyan (Sweet Hereafter, Ararat), Don McKellar (Childstar), Bruce McDonald (Picture Claire, Hard Core Logo) and Paul Schrader (Autofocus). At that time, he also produced a few internet-only projects, including a series called, "The Wife Beaters" about two controversial rappers.

Along with recording ADR and other sound effects, Peter had also performed voice-over work in numerous films and TV shows that include: "I Was A Sixth Grade Alien", "Picture Claire", "Ararat", and "Auto Focus".

== Film Work ==
Peter continues to write, direct and act in projects for his website: kambasis.com.

== Music ==
Peter has released multiple self-published albums. These albums include:

- 1. Party on Facebooke (December 3 2024) 9 Tracks
- 2. Harry Peoples City (December 15 2024) 11 Tracks
- 3. Thanks Social Media! (December 31 2024) 8 Tracks
- 4. Have No Bananas (January 30 2025) 12 Tracks
- 5. Someone Call HR (February 24 2025) 10 Tracks
- 6. Harry Peoples Returns (March 9 2025) 11 Tracks
- 7. Diversity Equity Inclusion (April 13 2025) 9 Tracks
- 8. i.am/muthaComputer (May 18 2025) 8 Tracks
- 9. the.techno-greek.is.here (EP) (July 07 2025) 6 Tracks
- 10. Harry Peoples Scripture (August 26 2025) 9 Tracks
- 11. Crackers Love Cheese (September 14 2025) 10 Tracks
- 12. the.techno-greek.σεξι.μαδαφακα (EP) (December 7 2025) 5 Tracks

== Awards ==
- The Carbon Freeze Sequence (2006) "Award for Best Creativity (Jedi)" – Directed by Peter Kambasis. Produced by Michael Longfield, Michael Dobbin, Amy Carroll and Victor Szabo. Voiced by Michael Dobbin, Michael Longfield, Peter Kambasis and Amy Carroll. Music by Victor Szabo.
- Yeah I'm Hip Hop (2004) Runner Up – 3rd Annual Hub (Formally "Toronto Computes!") Digital Video Contest. Written, Directed and Starring Peter Kambasis.
- Bowlin' (2001) 1st prize at the 1st Annual Toronto Computes! Digital Video Contest. Peter starred in this film.
- It's Not Easy Being Greek (1998) “Best Fiction Film” at the Student Film and Video Festival in Montreal 1998 & Special Commendation 1998 CIAFF Awards. Written, Directed and Starring Peter Kambasis.
