= Acid Test (band) =

Canadian alternative band

- Origin: Toronto, Ontario, Canada
- Genres: Electronic rock, dance rock, alternative rock, funk, techno
- Years active: 1990–1994, 2012, 2016–2019
- Labels: Sire, Eggplant Records
- Members: Lucy Di Santo; Steve Fall; Atom Percy; Tim van de Ven
- Past members: Mike Harland (d 2012); Jim Alty
- Website: acidtestmusic.com

Acid Test is a Canadian alternative band from Toronto. The band consists of vocalist and bassist Lucy Di Santo, guitarist Steve Fall, keyboardist Atom Percy, and drummer Tim van de Ven.

== History ==
Acid Test formed in Toronto in 1990. The group independently released a cassette in 1991 and put out an album, Trip on This on Eggplant Records in 1992. After Fall was asked to play a role in the 1992 movie Highway 61, directed by Bruce McDonald, the group composed two tracks on the movie's soundtrack ("Mr. Skin" and "Dance"). Sire Records (Warner Music Group) signed the band in 1993, they released the album Drop that year and performed in the US. In addition to regular band members, Drop also featured Geoff Bennett (percussion) and Jeff Dalziel (programming).

The band was the opening act for Nine Inch Nails, Grace Jones, Snow, 54-40, The Ocean Blue, and for the last live performance, in Toronto, of The Sugarcubes. It also played across the US, Canada and the UK. In addition to Highway 61, Acid Test contributed to the soundtracks for the 1991 documentary, Talk 16. Their song "Shake" was used in Martin Scorsese's 1993 film Naked in New York.

Acid Test went on a hiatus in 1994, reforming in 2012 to work on a third studio recording at Atom Percy's home recording studio in British Columbia. In 2018, the band released the EP Jus Rite.

== Discography ==
- Acid Test (1991)
- Trip on This (1992), EP, Eggplant Records
- Drop (1993), Sire Records
- Mr. Skin (1993), EP, Remix. Sire, Reprise
- Jus Rite (2018), EP. Independent
