= Last Night (1998 film) =

1998 film by Don McKellar

- Theatrical poster
- Directed by: Don McKellar
- Written by: Don McKellar
- Produced by: Niv Fichman; Daniel Iron
- Starring: Don McKellar; Sandra Oh; Callum Keith Rennie; Sarah Polley; David Cronenberg; Tracy Wright; Geneviève Bujold
- Cinematography: Douglas Koch
- Edited by: Reginald Harkema
- Music by: Alexina Louie; Alex Pauk
- Production companies: Alliance Atlantis; Odeon Films; Rhombus Media; La Sept; Canadian Broadcasting Corporation
- Distributed by: Alliance Atlantis Releasing
- Release dates: May 18, 1998 (Cannes); October 23, 1998 (Canada); March 3, 1999 (France)
- Running time: 95 minutes
- Countries: Canada; France
- Language: English
- Budget: C$2,300,000
- Box office: $591,165

Last Night is a Canadian-French 1998 apocalyptic black comedy-drama film directed by Don McKellar and starring McKellar, Sandra Oh and Callum Keith Rennie. It was produced as part of the French film project 2000, Seen By.... McKellar wrote the screenplay about how ordinary people would react to an unstated imminent global catastrophic event. Set in Toronto, Ontario, the film was made and released when many were concerned about the Year 2000 problem.

The film was released to positive reviews for McKellar's direction and Oh's acting. It won awards at the Cannes and Toronto International Film Festivals, and three Genie Awards, including Best Actress for Oh.

== Plot ==
In Toronto, a group of friends and family prepare for their last night before the end of the world, caused by a calamity that has not been explained but which has been expected for the last few months. The panic and rioting has largely died down, with only sporadic murders, robberies, and incidents of vandalism as humanity comes to terms with Earth's demise.

While Sandra scavenges leftovers in a supermarket, her car is vandalized, leaving her stranded. Patrick meets with his extended family for a mock Christmas dinner celebration. Duncan, Sandra's husband, spends much of the day reassuring his customers that their heating gas will be kept on until the very end. Craig is having sex with Lily to mark every sexual milestone he can think of.

Patrick leaves the dinner early to spend his final hours alone in his apartment. However, he unexpectedly meets Sandra at his front door. He reluctantly lets her in to use his phone to contact Duncan. Patrick offers to help Sandra steal a car, but eventually admits he doesn't know how to hotwire one. Meanwhile, Craig and Mrs. Carlton are having sex, and Donna turns up the music and lets herself go in the power company after Duncan had left.

Patrick meets his high school friend, Menzies, who is driving around to give out tickets to his concert with his cousin while Patrick and Sandra are trying to hitchhike. Later, Patrick, while visiting Craig in his apartment, convinces Craig to lend Sandra a car. After Sandra leaves, Craig tries to convince Patrick to enjoy sex in the final hours and discloses his omnisexual approach to addressing all of his fantasies before "the end." Craig later tells Patrick that he is not belittling Patrick but trying to inspire him to enjoy his final hours. While Patrick is leaving Craig's apartment, Craig attempts to initiate sex with him, but he refuses, despite his love for Craig.

The local DJ is spending his last hours playing the "Top 500 of All Time," which is heard on various radios. It mainly consists of pop tunes from the early '70s by artists such as The 5th Dimension, Looking Glass, The DeFranco Family, and Edward Bear. At one point, he reiterates he is playing the Top 500 of All Time, then amusingly adds, "According to me!"

In the final hour, Duncan opens the door upon hearing a gunshot on the street only to be held hostage by Marty; in the concert that only a few people have attended, Mrs. Carlton quietly walks in and takes a seat while Menzies plays a dissonant piano piece on the stage. Sandra is stopped by a group of protesters who block traffic and vandalize the car she borrowed from Craig. Sandra then returns to Patrick's apartment. Using Patrick's phone, Sandra listens to Duncan's voicemail in which he assured his power company's customers that the gas will be running until the end. Upon realizing she will not reunite with Duncan, Sandra asks Patrick to join in her suicide pact which she had with Duncan. Patrick initially refuses, stating that he needs to know her more and to find a reason to love her in order to consider it, so they share their stories, slowly progressing into a serious topic: Patrick's lost loved one.

As midnight approaches, Craig meets with Donna and finds it difficult to believe that she is a virgin. Donna finds herself ashamed but Craig successfully turns the situation around and they have sex. Patrick's parents meet the end in prayer, while his sister and her significant other join a street celebration. While Patrick and Sandra make their final attempt to contact Duncan, it is revealed that Duncan was killed by Marty. Patrick and Sandra both sit on the roof facing each other, listening to the song "Guantanamera," each holding a loaded pistol to the other's temple. However, as the final seconds approach, both characters, overcome with emotion, lower their pistols and slowly embrace in a kiss.

== Cast ==
- Don McKellar as Patrick Wheeler, the male protagonist who is depressed after losing his loved one due to sickness.
- Sandra Oh as Sandra, Duncan's wife, the female protagonist who is stranded in the city.
- Callum Keith Rennie as Craig Zwiller, Patrick's best friend. He spent his final hours having a sex marathon.
- Robin Gammell as Mr. Wheeler, Patrick's father.
- Roberta Maxwell as Mrs. Wheeler, Patrick's mother.
- Sarah Polley as Jennifer "Jenny" Wheeler, Patrick's sister, Alex's girlfriend.
- Trent McMullen as Alex, Jennifer's boyfriend.
- Charmion King as Patrick's Grandmother.
- Jessica Booker as Rose. She is invited to Patrick family's mock Christmas dinner celebration.
- David Cronenberg as Duncan, Sandra's husband. He works in a power company.
- Tracy Wright as Donna. She works in the same power company with Duncan. She is a virgin and has sex with Craig in the final hour.
- Geneviève Bujold as Mrs. Carlton, Patrick's and Craig's high school French teacher. She knows Craig's step mother and has sex with Craig.
- Karen Glave as Lily. She has sex with Craig knowing that Craig is only having sex with her because she is of African descent.
- Michael McMurtry as Menzies, Patrick's high school friend. He is having a concert in the final hours.
- Michael Barry as Marty. He shot Duncan with a shotgun.
- Nathalie Shats as Marty's Girlfriend. She tried to stop Marty from killing Duncan.
- Arsinée Khanjian as Streetcar Mother. She is left stranded in a Metro with her daughter.
- Chandra Michaels as Streetcar Daughter. She is left stranded in a Metro with her mother.
- Jackie Burroughs as The Runner. She is seen running throughout the film, regularly shouting out how much time is left 'til the end.
- Bob Martin as The Television Newscaster.
- Tom McCamus as The Radio Broadcaster.

== Production ==
=== Development ===
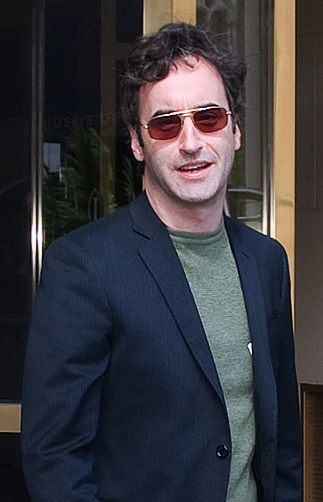
Director Don McKellar wrote the script inspired by the upcoming millennium and a French film project to depict it.

Director Don McKellar wrote the screenplay after being approached by the French producer Caroline Benjo of the firm Haut et Court who asked him to join a project called "2000, Seen By..." consisting of films depicting the approaching millennium seen from the perspectives of 10 different countries. McKellar feared that a story about the millennium would become dated immediately after the millennium and even questioned whether the end of the millennium has any significance. Instead, McKellar was inspired to make his film about the end of the world, which only focuses on ordinary people's decisions, actions, and encounters that have no significant impact to the imminent catastrophic. Therefore, McKellar asked his friends what they would do if they knew the end was coming, basing his screenplay on their responses. His script does not explain why the world is ending because he did not view that as the point of the story. However, McKellar acknowledged that the film's sun shining throughout the night "seems to suggest some major planetary alignment problems." The film marked McKellar's first time directing a feature.

For the C$2.2 million budget, McKellar secured the Canadian Broadcasting Corporation as the main sponsor, with Haut et Court providing less than half of the budget. Afterwards, more money was raised. Rhombus Media was a major sponsor.

=== Filming ===
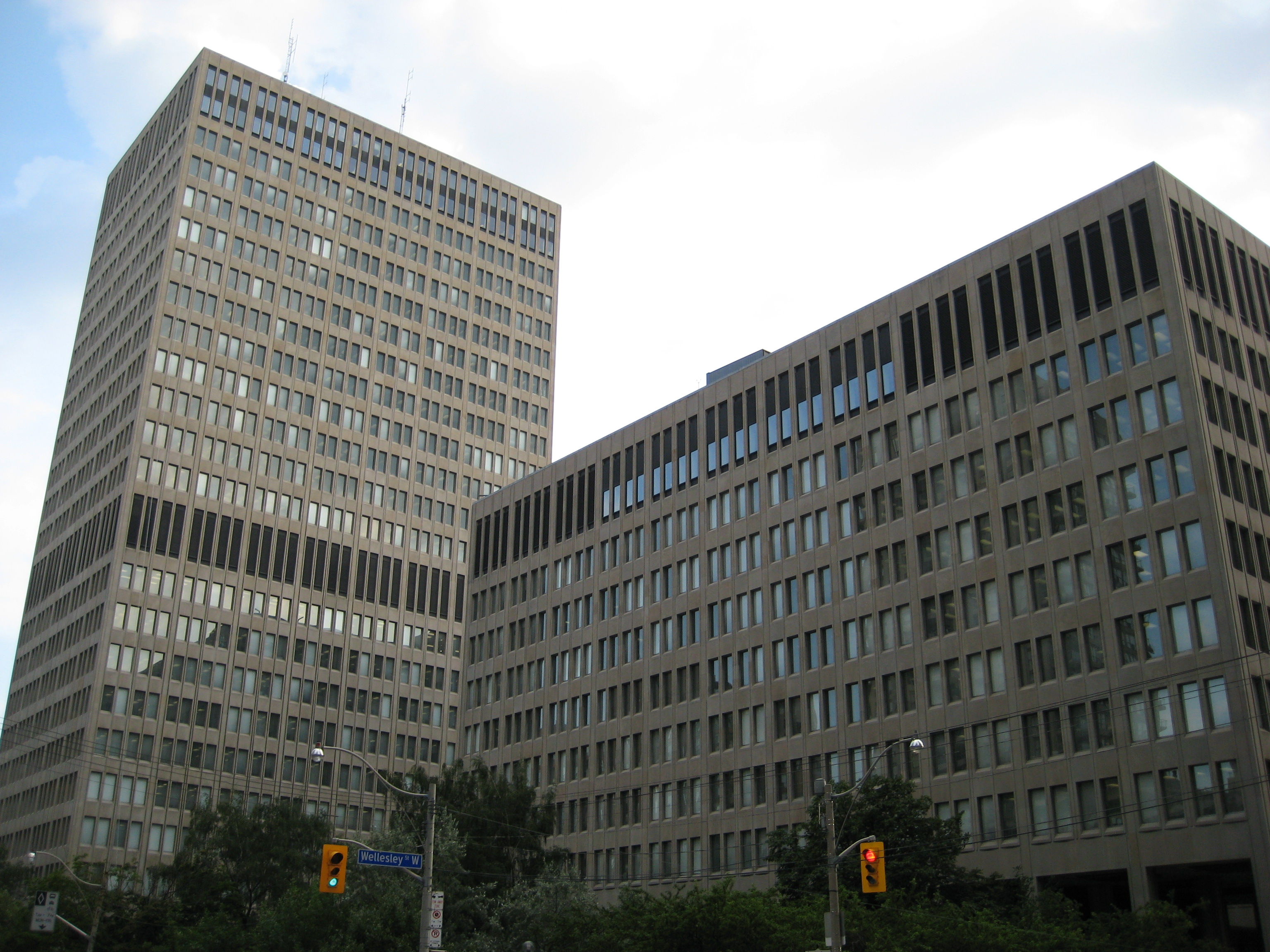
Much of the filming took place in the Macdonald Block in Toronto.

For the part of Duncan, McKellar cast Canadian director David Cronenberg, with McKellar explaining, "He takes his acting seriously," and "Cronenberg typified a certain type of person for me: a soft-spoken, articulate, careful character who may have a wild interior life- the most sane or the most insane character in the film." Initially concerned about directing and acting at the same time, McKellar opted to keep the direction simple, aiming for a "fairly austere and elegant" style. Shortly before shooting began, he learned a Hollywood film called Armageddon was in the works, but opted to go ahead upon hearing the stories were substantially different.

Last Night was filmed on location in and near Toronto between September 15 and October 19, 1997. Shooting primarily took place at the Macdonald Block and apartment buildings near The Annex. Filmmakers used computers to depict an overturned streetcar, since overturning a real one would have been too expensive. Cinematographer Douglas Koch used bleach bypass for sad visuals.

== Release ==
Following an advance showing for critics in Paris, Last Night premiered at the Cannes Film Festival on May 18, 1998, in the Directors' Fortnight section. It was the first film played in Canada Perspectives at the Toronto International Film Festival on September 11, 1998, and was theatrically released in the rest of Canada on October 23. In France, it was theatrically released by Haut et Court on March 3, 1999. Afterwards, Lions Gate Entertainment obtained United States distribution rights.

McKellar testified before the Parliament of Canada that Last Night played in theatres across Canada, before being replaced in many locations by Meet Joe Black. By mid-February 1999, Last Night had grossed $400,000 in Canadian theatres, a "respectable" sum, though McKellar noted the film performed better in Athens, Greece than in Toronto.

== Reception ==
=== Critical reception ===
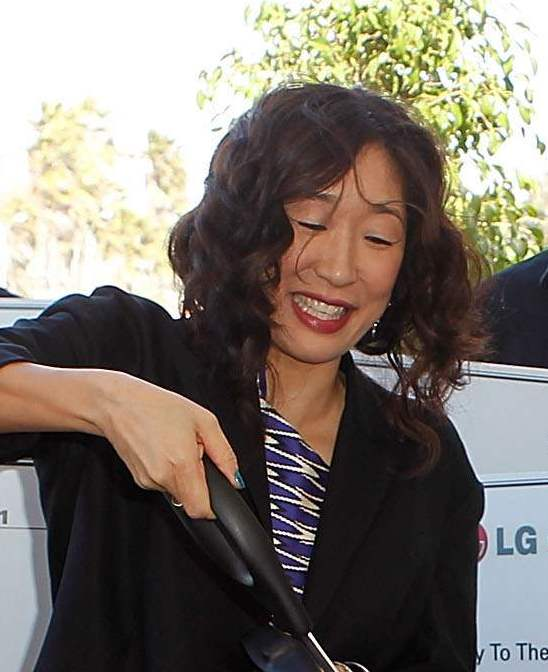
Sandra Oh received positive reviews for her performance and won the Genie Award for Best Actress.

The film received positive reviews, with Rotten Tomatoes reporting an 85% approval rating from 53 reviews, with an average rating of 7.2/10, and the critical consensus stating, "An engrossing, poignant film, Last Night examines the end of the world through humorous and thought-provoking dialogue." Roger Ebert gave the film three stars, noting fears of Y2K were prominent when he was writing in December 1999, but Last Night's apocalypse "paints a picture more bittersweet than violent." He found "moments of startling poignancy" in the last two-thirds of the film. Stephen Holden of The New York Times called the film "a smart, stiff-upper-lip alternative to a movie like Armageddon," and said McKellar and Sandra Oh give "intense performances," but expected more panic in the case of the apocalypse. Entertainment Weekly gave the film an A−, calling it "a surreal, elegantly melancholy, and yet witty ensemble story," and Oh a "scene-stealer." Peter Howell of the Toronto Star commented on the many Canadian cast members, suggesting the film is "too damn Canuck for its own good," and a riot scene would help. For Maclean's, Tanya Davies declared it "a millennial coup." Outside North America, critics favoured the film as "the perfect antidote" to U.S. apocalyptic films, with a U.K. critic adding "Only in Canada can you get away with a film like this." Time Out called the film "a witty, perceptive movie, exceptionally well structured."

In 2002, readers of Playback magazine voted Last Night the ninth greatest Canadian film of all-time. In 2012, Oliver Lyttelton of IndieWire named it one of five "underseen" apocalypse films worth viewing, writing that it compared well to Armageddon and Deep Impact (1998) for "its quiet, character driven approach," and that it was likely the inspiration for Seeking a Friend for the End of the World (2012). In 2014, Colin McNeil of Metro News wrote "Last Night is perhaps the most upbeat end-of-the-world movie you’ll ever see."

In 2001, an industry poll conducted by Playback named it the third best Canadian film of the preceding 15 years.

=== Accolades ===
McKellar won for Last Night the "Award of the Youth" at the Cannes Film Festival and Best Canadian First Feature Film at the 1998 Toronto International Film Festival. The film also won three Genie Awards, where McKellar was effectively competing against himself as a screenwriter of both Last Night and The Red Violin.

Award	Date of ceremony	Category	Recipient(s)	Result	Ref(s)
Canadian Comedy Awards	6 April 2000	Film Directing	Don McKellar	Won	
Canadian Comedy Awards	6 April 2000	Film Writing	Don McKellar	Nominated	
Canadian Comedy Awards	6 April 2000	Film Performance – Male	Callum Keith Rennie	Nominated	
Canadian Comedy Awards	6 April 2000	Film Performance – Female	Tracy Wright	Nominated	
Canadian Society of Cinematographers	1999	Cinematography in Theatrical Feature	Douglas Koch	Nominated	
Cannes Film Festival	13–24 May 1998	Award of the Youth	Don McKellar	Won	
Genie Awards	4 February 1999	Best Motion Picture	Daniel Iron and Niv Fichman	Nominated	
Genie Awards	4 February 1999	Best Direction	Don McKellar	Nominated	
Genie Awards	4 February 1999	Best Actress	Sandra Oh	Won	
Genie Awards	4 February 1999	Best Supporting Actor	Callum Keith Rennie	Won	
Genie Awards	4 February 1999	Best Supporting Actress	Geneviève Bujold	Nominated	
Genie Awards	4 February 1999	Best Supporting Actress	Roberta Maxwell	Nominated	
Genie Awards	4 February 1999	Best Screenplay	Don McKellar	Nominated	
Genie Awards	4 February 1999	Best Art Direction	John Dondertman and Patricia Cuccia	Nominated	
Genie Awards	4 February 1999	Best Cinematography	Douglas Koch	Nominated	
Genie Awards	4 February 1999	Best Editing	Reginald Harkema	Nominated	
Genie Awards	4 February 1999	Best Sound	John J. Thomson, Dean Giammarco, Miguel Nunes and Paul A. Sharpe	Nominated	
Genie Awards	4 February 1999	Best Original Score	Alex Pauk and Alexina Louie	Nominated	
Genie Awards	4 February 1999	Claude Jutra Award	Don McKellar	Won	
Toronto Film Critics Association	16 December 1998	Best Canadian Film	Don McKellar	Won	
Toronto International Film Festival	10–19 September 1998	Best Canadian First Feature Film	Don McKellar	Won	
Vancouver International Film Festival	25 September – 11 October 1998	Woman in Film Award	Sandra Oh	Won	
Mar del Plata International Film Festival	12 - 21 November 1998	OCIC Award	Don McKellar	Won	

== See also ==
- Melancholia (2011 film)
- Twitch City
- List of apocalyptic films
