= Vancouver Film Critics Circle Awards 2004 =

Annual Canadian film awards ceremony

5th VFCC Awards

February 20, 2005

Best Film:
Sideways

Best Canadian Film:
Childstar

The 5th Vancouver Film Critics Circle Awards, honoring the best in filmmaking in 2004, were given on 20 February 2005.

== Winners ==
=== International ===
- Best Actor:
  - Jamie Foxx - Ray
- Best Actress:
  - Imelda Staunton - Vera Drake
- Best Director:
  - Clint Eastwood - Million Dollar Baby
- Best Documentary Feature:
  - Fahrenheit 9/11
- Best Film:
  - Sideways
- Best Foreign Language Film:
  - Un long dimanche de fiançailles (A Very Long Engagement), France
- Best Supporting Actor:
  - Morgan Freeman - Million Dollar Baby
- Best Supporting Actress:
  - Virginia Madsen - Sideways

=== Canadian ===
- Best Actor:
  - Don McKellar - Childstar
- Best Actress:
  - Joely Collins - The Love Crimes of Gillian Guess
- Best Director:
  - Don McKellar - Childstar
- Best Film:
  - Childstar
- Best Supporting Actor:
  - Dave Foley - Childstar
- Best Supporting Actress:
  - Rebecca Jenkins - Wilby Wonderful
