= Alexina Louie =

Canadian composer (born 1949)

- Born: 30 July 1949 (age 76); Vancouver, British Columbia, Canada
- Genres: Contemporary classical
- Occupation: Composer
- Years active: 1981–present
- Website: www.alexinalouie.ca

Alexina Diane Louie, OC OOnt FRSC (born 30 July 1949), is a Canadian composer of contemporary classical music. She has composed for various instrumental and vocal combinations in a variety of genres. She has fulfilled a number of commissions, and her works, which have been performed internationally, have earned her a number of awards, including the Order of Canada and two Juno Awards.

== Early life and education ==
Louie was born in Vancouver, British Columbia. She earned an ARCT in Piano Performance diploma from the Royal Conservatory of Music at the age of 17 while under the tutelage of Jean Lyons. Shortly thereafter, Louie received a Bachelor of Music in music history from the University of British Columbia in 1970. In 1974, she completed her M.A. degree in composition from the University of California, San Diego.

== Career ==
While studying in the Greater Los Angeles Area, Louie was a member of an ensemble, and later she taught piano, theory, and electronic composition at Pasadena College and Los Angeles City College. One of her earliest compositions, completed in 1972, is an electronic piece for 4-channel tape entitled, Molly. The object in this composition, based on the last segment of James Joyce's novel Ulysses, was to make an electronic composition sound "human."

She created a number of piano compositions, including Scenes from a Jade Terrace, Distant Memories (dedicated to Jean Lyons) and I Leap Through the Sky With Stars for solo piano, Dragon Bells for prepared piano and pre-recorded prepared piano, and Concerto for Piano and Orchestra, which was commissioned by the Canadian Broadcasting Corporation (CBC).

Louie moved from Los Angeles to Toronto in 1980. Soon after, in 1982, she composed O Magnum Mysterium: In Memoriam Glenn Gould. She composed the opening music ("The Ringing Earth") for Expo 86 in Vancouver, and that year was named Composer of the Year by the Canadian Music Council.

Louie has twice won a Juno Award for Best Classical Composition: in 1989 for Songs of Paradise (1984), and in 2000 for Shattered Night, Shivering Stars (1997) - both are orchestral works. She has received several additional nominations for various works.

Orchestral scores include The Eternal Earth (commissioned by the Toronto Symphony), Music for a Thousand Autumns (commissioned by the Ensemble SMCQ) and Music for Heaven and Earth (commissioned by the Esprit Orchestra).

Louie's works of chamber music include The Distant Shore for piano trio, Edges for string quartet, Music from Night's Edge for piano quintet, Riffs for oboe, clarinet and bassoon, and Gallery Fanfares, Arias and Interludes (commissioned by the Art Gallery of Ontario in 1993).

In 1990, 1992, and later in 2003, Louie received the SOCAN Concert Music Award for the most performed Classical composer of the year.

Louie and her husband Alex Pauk, conductor of the Esprit Orchestra, collaborated on several film scores including Don McKellar's Last Night, which received a Genie nomination for Best Original Score in 1998, and The Five Senses, a film by Jeremy Podeswa that premiered at the Cannes Film Festival the following year. In conjunction with David Henry Hwang, Louie composed a full-length opera, The Scarlet Princess (1996–2002).

In 1996 Louie received an honorary doctorate from the University of Calgary. That year she was composer-in-residence at the Canadian Opera Company. In 1999 she won the Jules Léger Prize for New Chamber Music for Nightfall, a work for 14 strings written for I Musici de Montreal.

The Scarlet Princess, which was premiered by the Canadian Opera Company in 2002, is an erotic ghost story based on a 17th-century Japanese Kabuki play. Her eight-minute comic mini-opera entitled, Toothpaste (1995), based on a libretto by Dan Redican, has been broadcast in more than a dozen countries. With Redican, Louie also completed Burnt Toast, which consists of eight comic mini-operas for television, in 2005. She draws upon the music for the Queen of the Night aria, "Der Hölle Rache", from Mozart's The Magic Flute, as well as music from Wagner's Tristan und Isolde.

Songs of Paradise was re-recorded by the Thunder Bay Symphony Orchestra and Music Director Geoffrey Moull in 2004, and subsequently released on the album, Variations on a Memory. It became the best-selling disc of the Canadian Music Centre in 2005.

Louie's composition Three Fanfares from the Ringing Earth, was performed at the opening of the new National Gallery of Canada in Ottawa, and Scenes from a Jade Terrace, opened the new Canadian Embassy in Tokyo. Her Infinite Sky With Birds, a National Arts Centre commission, debuted on 22 February 2006. That year, she was made a Fellow of the Royal Society of Canada.

Louie's composition Mulroney: The Opera, a musical satire of Brian Mulroney's life, was released by Alliance Films in April 2011. In 2013 her composition "Bringing the Tiger Down From the Mountain" was performed by the National Arts Centre Orchestra during their tour of China.

Louie was honoured in 2019 by the Honens International Piano Competition in Calgary, which hosted a feature event of her compositions.

== Awards ==
- Canadian Music Council Composer of the Year, 1986
- Juno Award for Best Classical Composition, 1989, 2000
- SOCAN music award. 1990. 1992, 2003
- Honorary doctorate, University of Calgary, 1996
- Jules Léger Prize for New Chamber Music, 1999
- Order of Ontario, 2001
- Officer of the Order of Canada, 2002
- Molson Prize, Canada Council for the Arts, 2019

== See also ==
- Music of Canada
- List of Canadian composers
