= Vancouver Film Critics Circle Awards 2006 =

Annual Canadian film awards ceremony

7th VFCC Awards

January 9, 2007

Best Film:
Children of Men

Best Canadian Film:
The Rocket

The 7th Vancouver Film Critics Circle Awards, honoring the best in filmmaking in 2006, were given on 9 January 2007.

== Winners ==
=== International ===
- Best Actor:
  - Forest Whitaker - The Last King of Scotland
- Best Actress:
  - Helen Mirren - The Queen
- Best Director:
  - Alfonso Cuarón - Children of Men
- Best Film:
  - Children of Men
- Best Foreign Language Film:
  - Volver (To Return), Spain
- Best Supporting Actor:
  - Alan Arkin - Little Miss Sunshine
- Best Supporting Actress:
  - Cate Blanchett - Notes on a Scandal

=== Canadian ===
- Best Actor:
  - Don McKellar - Monkey Warfare
- Best Actress:
  - Carrie-Anne Moss - Fido
- Best British Columbia Film:
  - Fido
- Best Director:
  - Reginald Harkema - Monkey Warfare
- Best Film:
  - The Rocket
- Best Supporting Actor:
  - J.R. Bourne - Everything's Gone Green
- Best Supporting Actress:
  - Nadia Litz - Monkey Warfare
