= I'm Yours (film) =

2011 film

- Film poster
- Directed by: Leonard Farlinger
- Written by: Leonard Farlinger
- Produced by: John Hamilton; Jennifer Jonas; Avi Federgreen; Mallary Davenport
- Starring: Rossif Sutherland; Karine Vanasse; Don McKellar
- Cinematography: Jonathon Cliff
- Edited by: Matthew Hannam
- Music by: Ohad Benchetrit; Justin Small
- Production company: New Real Films
- Distributed by: Entertainment One
- Release dates: 11 September 2011 (TIFF); 20 April 2012 (Canada)
- Running time: 79 minutes
- Country: Canada
- Language: English

I'm Yours is a 2011 Canadian romantic comedy film written and directed by Leonard Farlinger.

== Plot ==
On the verge of his thirtieth birthday, Robert (Rossif Sutherland), a wealthy Wall Street broker, grieves his latest relationship gone awry and questions a loss of meaning and purpose to his career. Disenchanted with his life, he liquidates his assets and celebrates his newfound freedom that night in a Manhattan bar where he spots the mysterious, attractive Daphne (Karine Vanasse). Under the influence of alcohol and prodded on by his older mentor Phil (Don McKellar), Robert attempts to make a pass at Daphne only to be surprised by her responsiveness. The attraction between the two grows and soon they are off to a motel for a night of impassioned love-making infused with a hefty dose of drugs and alcohol.

Early the next morning, Daphne prepares to leave but hesitates when she discovers Robert’s tote bag filled with cash. She blackmails Robert into posing as her fiancé and travelling to North Bay to visit her parents. Later that morning, Robert awakens hungover in the passenger seat of his own car, to discover Daphne's ploy. Robert reluctantly relents to playing along as they reach the border crossing. Soon the two are traversing the Canadian wilderness with Daphne at the wheel of Robert's hatchback.

After a period of time, the car radiator breaks down, forcing Daphne to pull over on a deserted portion of the highway. The pair eventually wave down a passing car, whose driver agrees to take them as far as Pembroke. At a pitstop, Daphne phones home, telling her mother she is engaged to be married and arranges for her and Robert to have lunch with her parents the next day. Daphne reveals to Robert that her parents kicked her out of the house ten years ago and that she has not spoken to her father since.

Their driver drops them off at a motel, where Daphne tries unsuccessfully to seduce Robert. Robert calls his mentor Phil, who claims he hired Daphne to hook up with Robert as a birthday present. The next morning Robert confronts Daphne who admits Phil had indeed hired her to sleep with Robert. On the bus to North Bay, Daphne apologizes to Robert, telling him she will return the money after they meet her parents. Daphne reveals her real name is Marie.

Upon reaching the bus terminal, Daphne/Marie returns the valise of cash to Robert, who, afraid he has been duped by Daphne/Marie, abruptly announces he is heading back to New York City. Daphne/Marie goes alone to her parents’ house while Robert realizes Daphne/Marie had kept her promise and his money had been left untouched. Robert shows up late at the door and plays the part of Daphne’s fiancé.

Later, Daphne/Marie reveals she has a daughter, Natalie, and she and Robert go to visit Natalie at Sunday school. Daphne/Marie encounters Natalie but leaves shortly thereafter to catch a bus back to Manhattan. At the bus terminal, Daphne/Marie and Robert prepare to buy their tickets when Daphne’s father walks in accompanied by her mother and Natalie. Her father reveals her mother asked him to come to the bus terminal after Natalie called them. Daphne/Marie reconciles with her father and Natalie urges her mother Daphne/Marie to stay. Daphne/Marie and Robert agree. The movie closes with a reunited Daphne/Marie, Natalie, and Robert standing outside the bus terminal, gazing at a flock of geese soaring across the sky. Daphne/Marie and Robert look deeply into each other's eyes and smile.

== Cast ==
- Rossif Sutherland as Robert
- Karine Vanasse as Daphne
- Don McKellar as Phil
- Nicholas Campbell as Father
- Greg Calderone as Customs Officer
- Gregory 'Dominic' Odjig as Winston
- Marie-Hélène Fontaine as Mother
- Ella Jonas Farlinger as Natalie
- Jamie Lyle as Children's Counciller

== Reception ==
=== Critical response ===
Liam Lacey of The Globe and Mail, gave the film two stars out of four, stating, "the plot collapses into a fairy-tale ending that is offered as an odd remedy for the characters’ facile defeatism." Peter Howell of the Toronto Star also criticized the plot, stating, "A miscast and mismatched Rossif Sutherland and Karine Vanasse stretch credulity at every quirk-filled turn as they follow a bag of loot and chase family problems on the long trek from New York to Ontario's 'Gateway to the North.' " Howell further remarked: "The eye-rolling script is the main problem." To Toronto Star critic Linda Barnard, the film offered little to write home about. Barnard gave the film one and a half stars out of four, writing, "Even the sex is dull in I’m Yours, ... Farlinger's Canuck road movie that takes an ill-matched pair from New York to North Bay but ends up going nowhere." Joe Leydon of Variety described the film as "entirely predictable and instantly forgettable," noting the leads Rossif Sutherland and Karine Vanesse "do little to distract from the shopworn contrivances of Farlinger’s scenario" while "struggling with sketchy roles and gaping plotholes."

Some critics found merit in the actors' performances and the film's overarching themes. CBC News critic Deanne Sumanac called I'm Yours the "Sexiest Canadian Film" at the 2011 Toronto IFF. Nathalie Atkinson of the National Post described the film's "ecstasy-fuelled motel room romp" as "coy, urgent, sexy and probably one of the hottest love scenes in a mainstream movie, Canadian or otherwise, in a long time." Robert Bell of Exclaim writes, "An overriding theme of chance changing the world fuels the romantic trajectory of the film," which is "touching and ultimately satisfying as a philosophically light love story." Marc Glassman of Montage described the actors' onscreen chemistry as "wild, exhilarating and unexpectedly emotional" stating, "I’m Yours is a torrid journey that grips the viewer—and never lets go."

The film was noted for showcasing Northern Ontario scenery.
