= Monkey Warfare =

- Film poster
- Directed by: Reginald Harkema
- Written by: Reginald Harkema
- Produced by: Leonard Farlinger; Jennifer Jonas; Kris King
- Starring: Don McKellar; Tracy Wright; Nadia Litz
- Cinematography: Jonathon Cliff
- Edited by: Kathy Winkauf
- Music by: DJ Hans Lucas
- Release dates: September 10, 2006 (TIFF); November 15, 2006 (Canada)
- Running time: 75 minutes
- Country: Canada
- Language: English

Monkey Warfare is a 2006 Canadian drama film written and directed by Reginald Harkema, starring Don McKellar, Tracy Wright, and Nadia Litz. The film received multiple awards at the Vancouver Film Critics Circle Awards 2006, and received an honorable mention from the Best Canadian Feature Film jury at the 2006 Toronto International Film Festival.

== Cast ==
- Don McKellar as Dan
- Tracy Wright as Linda
- Nadia Litz as Susan
- Earl Pastko as Ted
- Rob Stefaniuk as real estate agent
- Brenda Robbins as figurine lady
- Marya Delver as bike girl
- Sarah Manninen as bike girl
- Rachel Wilson as bike girl
- Erin McMurtry as bike girl
- Marnie Robinson as bike girl
- Jayne Eastwood as garage sales lady
- Caroline Gillis as female cop
- Lee Rumohr and Melissa Veszi as young couple
- Isabel and Jason Knight as husband and wife

== Soundtrack ==
1. "The Black Poodle" - performed by Comets on Fire
2. "Nuclear War" - written and performed by Sun Ra
3. "(Ballad of the) Hip Death Goddess" - written and performed by Ultimate Spinach
4. "The Old Revolution" - written and performed by Leonard Cohen
5. "What If We All Stopped Paying Taxes?" - performed by Sharon Jones & The Dap-Kings
6. "Girls Like That" - performed by Weird War
7. "Saturday Afternoon" - performed by Outrageous Cherry
8. "Kill For Peace" and "Group Grope" - performed by The Fugs
9. "Protest Song '68" - performed by Refused
10. "Pow! to The People" - performed by The Make-Up
11. "I (fuck) Mountains" - performed by Pink Mountaintops

== Reception ==
On review aggregator website Rotten Tomatoes, the film has a rating of 75% based on 8 critics, with an average rating of 6.6/10.
