= Trigger (2010 film) =

2010 film

- Film poster
- Directed by: Bruce McDonald
- Written by: Daniel MacIvor
- Produced by: Leonard Farlinger; Jennifer Jonas
- Starring: Molly Parker; Tracy Wright; Don McKellar; Sarah Polley
- Cinematography: Jonathon Cliff
- Edited by: Matthew Hannam
- Music by: Brendan Canning
- Release date: 12 September 2010 (TIFF)
- Country: Canada
- Language: English

Trigger is a 2010 Canadian comedy-drama film directed by Bruce McDonald and starring Molly Parker and Tracy Wright as Kat and Vic, former rock stars reuniting their band Trigger for the first time since their retirement.

The film was originally planned in the late 1990s as a companion film to McDonald's Hard Core Logo, which would have starred Hugh Dillon and Callum Keith Rennie. However, work on the film remained dormant until McDonald and screenwriter Daniel MacIvor decided to rewrite their original screenplay to be about two women instead. Rennie does, however, appear in the film as his Hard Core Logo character Billy Tallent.

The film's cast also includes Daniel MacIvor, Don McKellar, Sarah Polley, Lenore Zann, Carole Pope and Julian Richings. Brendan Canning of Broken Social Scene wrote the film's score.

== Production ==
Wright was undergoing treatment for pancreatic cancer during the film's production. It was the last film she completed before her death.

== Distribution ==
The film premiered as a Special Presentation at the 2010 Toronto International Film Festival, at a screening that also marked the official opening of the TIFF Bell Lightbox.

== Awards and nominations ==
The film garnered four nominations at the 31st Genie Awards, including Best Actress nods for both Wright and Parker.

Wright and Parker jointly won the prize for Best Actress at the 2011 ACTRA Toronto Awards. Wright's husband McKellar, who appeared in the film, accepted the award in her honour, stating in his speech that the award "means more to me than any I've ever won".
