= Kumar and Mr. Jones =

1991 film

- Directed by: Sugith Varughese
- Written by: Sugith Varughese
- Produced by: Paul Brown; Leonard Farlinger
- Starring: John Gilbert; Ivan Smith; Michelle Duquet; Diego Matamoros
- Cinematography: Adam Swica
- Edited by: John Hektor
- Music by: Boko Suzuki
- Production company: Canadian Film Centre
- Release date: 1991
- Running time: 14 minutes
- Country: Canada
- Language: English

Kumar and Mr. Jones is a Canadian short drama film, directed by Sugith Varughese and released in 1991. The film centres on the relationship between Mr. Jones (John Gilbert), a bedridden older man, and Kumar (Ivan Smith), his Indo-Canadian caretaker whose power in the relationship is threatened when Mr. Jones begins responding favourably to treatment by Melissa (Michelle Duquet), a new physical therapist.

The film was made while Varughese was a student at the Canadian Film Centre.

The film received a Genie Award nomination for Best Live Action Short Drama at the 13th Genie Awards in 1992.
