= Toronto Film Critics Association Awards 1998 =

Annual Canadian film awards ceremony

2nd TFCA Awards

December 16, 1998

Best Film:
Saving Private Ryan

The 2nd Toronto Film Critics Association Awards, honoring the best in film for 1998, were held on 16 December 1998.

== Winners ==
- Best Actor:
  - Ian McKellen - Gods and Monsters

Runners-Up: Robert Duvall – The Apostle and Tom Hanks – Saving Private Ryan

- Best Actress:
  - Cate Blanchett - Elizabeth

Runners-Up: Christina Ricci – The Opposite of Sex and Pascale Bussières – August 32nd on Earth

- Best Canadian Film:
  - Last Night

Runners-Up: Nô and The Red Violin

- Best Director:
  - Steven Spielberg - Saving Private Ryan

Runners-Up: Todd Solondz – Happiness and Steven Soderbergh – Out of Sight

- Best Film:
  - Saving Private Ryan

Runners-Up: Happiness and The Celebration

- Clyde Gilmour Award:
  - Gerald Pratley
