= The Love Crimes of Gillian Guess =

- Directed by: Bruce McDonald
- Written by: Angus Fraser
- Produced by: Debra Beard; Rob Bromley; John Ritchie
- Starring: Joely Collins; Ben Bass; Hugh Dillon
- Cinematography: Danny Nowak
- Edited by: Karen Porter
- Music by: Broken Social Scene
- Production companies: Force Four Entertainment; Citytv
- Release date: September 17, 2004 (TIFF)
- Running time: 91 minutes
- Country: Canada
- Language: English

The Love Crimes of Gillian Guess is a Canadian drama film, directed by Bruce McDonald and released in 2004. The film is loosely based on the real-life story of Gillian Guess, who was convicted of obstruction of justice in 1998 after she became romantically involved with an accused murderer while serving as a juror at his trial, although McDonald himself freely admitted that the film takes "kooky" diversions into animated and musical sequences rather than attempting to literally depict the true story; in the adaptation, Guess is recounting her version of the story as a guest on a fictional television show hosted by tabloid talk show host Bobby Tomahawk.

The film stars Joely Collins as Guess, Ben Bass as Peter Gill and Hugh Dillon as Bobby Tomahawk. The film's score was composed by Broken Social Scene, including their single "Lover's Spit", although music by Lucinda Williams, Josh Rouse and Hugh Dillon Redemption Choir was also used.

The film premiered at the 2004 Toronto International Film Festival, but apart from some follow-up film festival and repertory theatre screenings it was distributed primarily as a television film on Citytv rather than going into general theatrical release.

It was a finalist for Best Motion Picture at the Leo Awards in 2005, and for Best Direction in a Dramatic Program or Miniseries at the 21st Gemini Awards. Collins won the award for Best Actress in a Canadian Film at the Vancouver Film Critics Circle Awards 2004.
