= Elimination Dance =

1998 Canadian short film

- Directed by: Bruce McDonald; Don McKellar; Michael Ondaatje
- Written by: Bruce McDonald; Don McKellar; Michael Ondaatje
- Produced by: Sandy Kaplansky
- Starring: Don McKellar; Tracy Wright; Michael Turner
- Cinematography: Bill St. John; Peter Mettler
- Edited by: Thor Henrikson; Reginald Harkema
- Production company: Shadow Shows
- Release date: September 12, 1998 (TIFF)
- Running time: 9 minutes
- Country: Canada
- Language: English

Elimination Dance is a 1998 Canadian short drama film. Directed by Bruce McDonald, Don McKellar and Michael Ondaatje based on Ondaatje's poem of the same name, the film stars McKellar and Tracy Wright as a couple in a jazz dance competition, in which various couples are eliminated as the announcer (Michael Turner) calls out various elimination criteria drawn from Ondaatje's poem.

Other people appearing in the film as non-speaking dancers include Meryn Cadell, Carole Pope, Laura Bertram, Valerie Buhagiar, Chas Lawther, Anna Stratton, Duke Redbird, Ryan Black, Esta Spalding, Leah Cherniak, James Allodi and Clement Virgo.

The film premiered at the 1998 Toronto International Film Festival.

The film was a Genie Award nominee for Best Live Action Short Drama at the 19th Genie Awards in 1999.
