= Peter Reder =

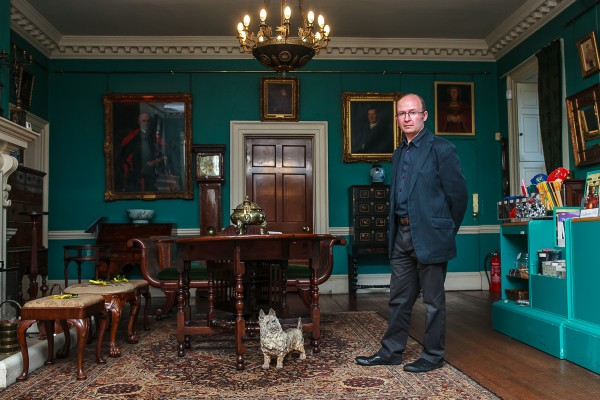
Peter Reder / The Contents of a House / Preston Manor / Brighton Festival 2014

Peter Reder (born London, 1960) is a British artist working in theatre, performance and installation. Much of his work has been concerned with history and memory, most notably the City of Dreams project and a series of site-based, promenade pieces in various museums, galleries and historic buildings in the UK and elsewhere. His work has been seen at the Brighton Festival, Battersea Arts Centre, Traverse Theatre, Somerset House and elsewhere in the UK, and internationally at Tretyakov Gallery, Moscow, Colliseum, Bucharest, Gammage Auditorium, Arizona, National Museum of Singapore, Carnegie Museum, Pittsburgh, La Laboral, Spain, Vancouver Art Gallery and at Magnetic North Theatre Festival, Ottawa. His work was included in the British Council Showcase in Edinburgh in 2005.

Reder studied music in London and Manchester before studying drama in Paris. He has an MA (hons) in Cultural Memory from the Institute of Germanic and Romance Studies, University of London.

== Works ==
City of Dreams

Described as 'breathtaking, monumental and fragile at the same time,' City of Dreams is a series of performance / installations exploring the memory and identity of cities through found objects and sounds. First developed as an educational project at Lewisham College, South London Gallery and the National Theatre Studio, it was subsequently re-staged in a number of cities around the world, with local participants in each location led by Reder and sound artist Tom Wallace. The project has been seen in Geissen, Bremen, Brisbane, Singapore, and most recently at the Push Festival, Vancouver in 2011 where it received an enthusiastic public and critical response. Reviewer Peter Dickinson considered it 'a stunning new way of looking at Vancouver,' others spoke of its 'exquisite beauty.'

Aide-memoire

A site-specific work at Somerset House in London and the first of a number of works featuring Reder in the role of tour guide in a heritage site or museum setting. The work mixed real and faux photographs and display objects, spoken word and video.

Guided Tour

Originally shown at McEwan Hall, Edinburgh as part of the Traverse Theatre festival fringe programme and the British Council Showcase in 2005. The performance concluded with a ten-minute film of the artist's mother in the role of the Angel of History, a reference to Walter Benjamin's use of the image of the Angelus Novus in his essay on the Philosophy of History. The List gave the show four stars, stating that it 'takes us down a fascinating road of cultural discovery.' For The Scotsman it was 'a tourist outing for deconstructionists.' Guided Tour was subsequently presented at La Laboral, Gijon, Spain, Tretyakov State Gallery, Moscow, Colosseum, Bucharest, Carnegie Museum of Art, PIttsburgh, Gammage Auditorium, Arizona, Vancouver Art Gallery, and National Museum of Singapore.

The Content of a House

A commission for the Brighton Festival in 2014. Preston Manor, Brighton.

The show was a 'slant-eyed look at heritage.' In Reder's guided tour the conventional narrative of the house and its wealthy, landowning inhabitants was made secondary in importance to the history of their servants and their dogs, and to a number of memories, associations and digressions. For Lyn Gardner writing in the Guardian, it was 'all about the spaces between, the invisible, what lurks unseen beneath the surface.'

Participatory Projects

Schools projects for LIFT (London International Festival of Theatre) in Hackney and Tower Hamlets. A residency and large scale performance at Claremont High School, Kenton.

Sanctuary City with asylum seekers in Southwark at the Copleston Centre.

Ice Harvest was part of a LIFT programme in Barking, East London. A series of guided tours led by local residents. Co-directed with Corinne Micallef.

A Soho Family Album at the Photographers Gallery, London, supported by the Soho Society.

New Work and Collaborations

Reder has embarked on a series of collaborations in recent years.

Peter and Valerie was created with Canadian-Maltese actor and filmmaker Valerie Buhagiar, with the support of a Fuel / Jerwood residency at Cove Park, Scotland, and the National Theatre Studio in London. Shown at the Magnetic North Theatre Festival, Ottawa in 2013.

My Russian Childhood is a solo storytelling show with music by Sean O'Hagan of The High Llamas, and has been developed at London at Battersea Arts Centre, JW3 and Rich Mix. In this work Reder's 'themes are genealogy and imaginative heritages; he saw his paternal grandfather, a shipboard stow-away from Odessa, as an exotic character from a land of revolution, wooden villages and “skating on the river.”

Reder is currently co-authoring a series of plays set in 19th century America with Oscar-winning actor and director Mark Rylance.
