= Picture Claire =

2001 film by Bruce McDonald

- Directed by: Bruce McDonald
- Written by: Semi Chellas
- Produced by: Wendy Grean; Robert Lantos
- Starring: Juliette Lewis; Gina Gershon; Mickey Rourke
- Cinematography: Miroslaw Baszak
- Edited by: Michael Pacek
- Music by: Paul Haslinger
- Distributed by: Alliance Atlantis
- Release date: 2001
- Running time: 91 minutes
- Countries: Canada; United States
- Languages: English; French
- Box office: $10,002

Picture Claire is a 2001 thriller film directed by Bruce McDonald based on a screenplay by Semi Chellas. The film stars Juliette Lewis, Gina Gershon, Callum Keith Rennie, Kelly Harms, Camilla Rutherford, Peter Stebbings, and Mickey Rourke. The film premiered at the Toronto International Film Festival, and also appeared at Cinéfest in Sudbury, where the film received Best Ontario Feature Award.

Lewis stars as Claire Beaucage, who gets in way over her head when she's in the wrong place at the wrong time.

== Plot ==
Claire (Juliette Lewis) is a woman from Quebec who gets in trouble with the vengeful heroin dealers she helped finger. They retaliate by burning her out of her apartment. Frightened and in need of refuge, she heads to Toronto for to stay with ex-lover photographer Billy Stuart (Kelly Harms). She speaks only French, she understands little English and speaks even less, she finds herself in the wrong place at the wrong time all too often. Claire has difficulties finding Billy but continues her search for him as the cops continue to search for her. She finally finds his gallery along with some photographs that he had taken of her in her sleep, he knew she hated having her picture taken. The exhibition of his work is opening and it seems to consist mostly of pictures of her.

Mickey Rourke played sleazy gangster Eddie and Gina Gershon portrays his tough-as-nails moll Lily Warden.

== Cast ==
- Juliette Lewis as Claire Beaucage
- Gina Gershon as Lily Warden
- Mickey Rourke as Eddie
- Callum Keith Rennie as Laramie
- Kelly Harms as Billy
- Tracy Wright as Det. Sweeney
- Camilla Rutherford as Cynthia Lacey
- Raoul Bhaneja as Det. Lee
- Barbara Eve Harris as Patricia

== Production ==
Mostly filmed in Toronto, Ontario, Canada. During location filming on a Toronto street, a woman was arrested for causing a disturbance after the filmmakers called for silence and she refused to stop blowing a whistle. Segments of the film were shot in Kensington Market, including inside Shampoo Hair Studio on St. Andrew St., which was rented and converted to look like a donut shop. Reflecting this locale, the film was marketed in Germany under the title Lost in Toronto.

The film contains extensive use of multi-dynamic image technique montage sequences, accordingly subdividing, connecting and multiplying film elements in demarcated panes.

== Reception ==
Intended to be released to theaters, the film never found a distributor, so Picture Claire was ultimately released direct-to-video or premiered on television like in Netherlands. Reviews for Picture Claire were mixed, but mostly negative. Jason Gorber from Filmfest.ca stated that "Bruce McDonald directs a mostly American cast in a staunch Toronto film" and gave it "Fresh" rating. The film was Rated R for violence, language and nudity by MPAA. Some critics speculated that based on its failure to find a distributor and its content, that it had potential to be a cult classic.

== Claire's Hat ==
Named after the original title of the film, McDonald created a documentary film about how he thought the film was a failure, where he said "I fucked up my own movie". Using stolen footage and outtakes from the film, he presented a DVD commentary style description of the shooting process, his arguments with his producer and his disappointment with himself to allow others to convince him to influence the film. The documentary has had rare screenings and was passed along to friends and some independent rental houses in Toronto.
