= Highway 61 (film) =

1991 film

- Directed by: Bruce McDonald
- Written by: Bruce McDonald; Don McKellar; Allan Magee
- Produced by: Colin Brunton; Bruce McDonald
- Starring: Valerie Buhagiar; Don McKellar; Earl Pastko; Peter Breck
- Cinematography: Miroslaw Baszak
- Edited by: Michael Pacek
- Music by: Nash the Slash
- Distributed by: Shadow Shows Incorporated (Canada)
- Release date: September 7, 1991 (TIFF)
- Running time: 102 minutes
- Country: Canada
- Language: English

Highway 61 is a 1991 Canadian film directed by Bruce McDonald. The film is an unofficial sequel to his 1989 film Roadkill; although focusing on different characters, it centres on a road trip beginning in Thunder Bay, Ontario, where the road trip depicted in the earlier film ended.

The film premiered at the 1991 Festival of Festivals.

== Plot ==
The film stars Don McKellar as Pokey Jones, an orphaned barber in a small town near Thunder Bay, who dreams of becoming a jazz musician. One morning, Jones discovers a frozen corpse (Steve Fall) in his backyard, and soon meets Jackie Bangs (Valerie Buhagiar), a tough and mysterious roadie who claims the dead man is her brother.

Jackie's real intention is to use the body, a vagrant unknown to anyone in town, to smuggle stolen drugs into the United States. She convinces Pokey to use his parents' car, which has not been driven in decades, to drive her to New Orleans to bury her brother. So Jackie and Pokey set out along Highway 61, coffin strapped to the top of the car, and follow Bob Dylan's famous U.S. Highway 61 south through the heart of the United States. They are pursued by Mr. Skin (Earl Pastko), who believes he is Satan and wants to claim the body because the dead man sold Mr. Skin his soul.

Peter Breck is fourth-billed as Mr. Watson, the "stage-mom" father of three girls: Mississippi (Missy), Minnesota (Minnie), and Louisiana (Louise). The film also includes cameo appearances by Tav Falco, Jello Biafra, and Art Bergmann.

== Music ==
Nash the Slash also composed the film's instrumental score.

A soundtrack album was released, featuring the following tracks:

1. Nash the Slash, "Into the Land of the Fire"
2. Rita Chiarelli and Colin Linden, "Highway 61 Revisited"
3. Bourbon Tabernacle Choir, "Put Your Head On"
4. Acid Test, "Dance"
5. Jane Hawley, "Momma's Waitin'"
6. Sam Larkin, "Sally On"
7. The Razorbacks, "My Way or the Highway"
8. Tom Jones, "It's Not Unusual"
9. Tav Falco, "Torture"
10. Acid Test, "Mr. Skin"
11. Jellyfishbabies, "The Erlking"
12. Anne Marie Stern, Carlton Rance, Vanessa Younger and Rosie Westney, "Can't Nobody Do Me Like Jesus"
13. Boozoo Chavis, "Zydeco Heehaw"

== Critical response ==
Jay Scott of The Globe and Mail wrote that "Highway 61 is an example of unconditional love. It acknowledges every wart, pockmark, pimple and pustule on its subject, and refuses to disguise even a single freckle, but it simultaneously finds the beauty in every blemish. "The trouble with the trumpet," Jackie informs Pokey, "is that no matter how good you are, it always comes out sounding like jazz." The trouble with Highway 61 is that no matter how bad Bruce McDonald wants to be, it always comes out sounding good."

For the Vancouver Sun, Elizabeth Aird wrote that "Highway 61 works best if you don't put pressure on it to be a seamless narrative. It's full of off-beat moments that are delicious in themselves. There's Pokey and Jackie's Dinner with Art - Vancouver hero Bergmann, that is, who plays Otto, the burned-out rocker. Otto and his lover, Margo the nutso singer, give Jackie and Pokey pistols and set about killing live chickens for dinner. This is set to the tune of Tom Jones singing It's Not Unusual, and, well, you kinda have to see it. There are sweet moments between Pokey and Jackie. Don McKellar is particularly great as Pokey, a would-be musician who can't blow a note on his beloved trumpet. He and Valerie Buhagiar were in Roadkill, too. I liked Buhagiar in Roadkill - not as much here. This time around, McKellar's performance is the one that gives the movie emotional resonance."

== Awards ==
McDonald won the Silver Shell for Best Director at the 1991 San Sebastián International Film Festival.

The film received two Genie Award nominations at the 13th Genie Awards in 1992, for Best Actor (McKellar) and Best Editing (Michael Pacek).

In 2001, an industry poll conducted by Playback named Highway 61 the 15th best Canadian film of the preceding 15 years.
