= Valerie Buhagiar =

Maltese actress

- Born: Mosta, Crown Colony of Malta
- Occupations: Actress; filmmaker

Valerie Buhagiar is a Maltese actress and filmmaker.

She studied acting at George Brown College in Toronto, Ontario, graduating in 1986. Her debut as a filmmaker was The Passion of Rita Camilleri, which won the Silver Plaque at the Chicago Film Festival in 1993.

Buhagiar has won two Dora Mavor Moore Awards, for The Lorca Play and White Trash, Blue Eyes.

She has also hosted film programming on the Canadian television networks Showcase and TVOntario.

== Filmography ==
The Passion of Rita Camilleri was Buhagiar's writing, directing and producing debut. The film has won several international prizes. The Karlovy Vary Film Festival held a retrospective of her work as an actor and a filmmaker. Other filmmaking credits include: One Day I Stood Still, L’amour L’amour Shut the Door Por Favor and BoomBoom Baby Wants to Go. She has directed a public service announcement for the Centre of Opportunity, Respect and Empowerment (C.O.R.E), a biography on Colin Linden for the Toronto Arts Awards and two Bravo!FACT shorts entitled Pictures from Home and Omneya – Wish. Buhagiar also directed the Festival of Lights, a parade full of vignettes set on rooftops of Toronto's Kensington Market, as well as video images for Theatre Gargantua's production of Nod. Tell Us the Truth Josephine – a bitter immigrant story and Small, Stupid and Insignificant both won the best experimental film at the Female Eye Film Festival.

Buhagiar continues to work on both stage and screen. She returned from the UK where she is developing a theatre piece with the support of the National Theatre Studio in London, England. In Vancouver, she performed the one-woman show 9 Parts of Desire. She has starred in the award-winning theatre production of Scorched at The Tarragon Theatre, National Arts Centre and the national touring company. She played in One Light /Neptune theatre's The Veil and won a Merritt Award nomination for Best Leading Actress. Valerie has played the leading roles in the Feature Films A Winter Tale (Toronto) Sheltered Life (Vancouver), and Adriatico My Love (Croatia).

Buhagiar can be seen on the small screen as well, with recent roles including a guest star spot on the CBC hit series The Border, in a recurring role on the international hit series Degrassi, and most recently NBC's Beauty and the Beast. Buhagiar developed a theatre piece titled Peter and Valerie, with UK artist Peter Reder through the National Theatre Studios in London, England. The piece was seen at the Magnetic North Theatre Festival in June 2013. She was also in Frankfurt to perform the one-woman show titled We Are Not Afraid of the Dark, by Tine Van Aerschot. This piece was performed at the Theatre Center in Toronto in May 2014.

Buhagiar's first feature film, The Anniversary, won best narrative feature comedy at Cinequest. She is presently developing four feature films and a theatre piece.

=== As actress ===
- Mrs. Soffel (1984)
- Roadkill (1989)
- New Shoes (1990)
- Highway 61 (1991)
- Ultimate Betrayal (1994)
- Romantic Undertaking (1996)
- Johnny Shortwave (1996)
- My Script Doctor (1997)
- The Silver Surfer (1998)
- Elimination Dance (1998)
- Expecting (2002)
- Cypher (2002)
- The Last Hit (2004)
- A Winter Tale (2007)
- Jimmy Two-Shoes (2009-2011) as Jez
- Degrassi: The Next Generation (2010-2011, 6 episodes)
- The Expanse (2017, as Melissa Suputayaporn)
- Bad Blood (2017, 3 episodes as Loredana)
- Mysticons (2017-2018, as Queen Necrafa)
- Abby Hatcher (2020-2022) as Farmer Jo

=== As director ===
- The Passion of Rita Camilleri (1993)
- One Day I Stood Still (1996)
- L'Amour L'Amour Shut the Door Por Favor (1998)
- Tell Us the Truth Josephine (2006)
- Small, Stupid and Insignificant (2010)
- The Anniversary (2014)
- The Fall of Grace (2017)
- Carmen (2021)
- The Dogs (2023)
