= Distant Memories =

Distant Memories is the third piece from Alexina Louie's Music for Piano. It was commissioned by the Alliance for Canadian New Music Projects in 1982. This piece features the changing meters and "senza misura", meaning "without measure". The other pieces in this songbook are "Changes", "The Enchanted Bells", and "Once Upon a Time". The four short solo piano pieces explore contemporary musical concepts and techniques while remaining accessible to younger students. As this was her first set of compositions for solo piano, it is fitting that Louie dedicated the pieces to her former childhood piano teacher and mentor Jean Lyons.

== Intention ==
The intention of Music for Piano was to create 4 contrasting works; Louie wanted "each work to address a new compositional, pianistic, or notational 'technique' or 'device'. At the same time, I did not want to write a dry pedagogical piece, as these pieces often are."

== Terms ==
=== Senza Misura ===
Instead of bar lines, the suggested performance time is given in seconds, which is marked by senza misura, or "without measure". This technique is also used in Louie's other pieces, which creates rhythmic complexity.

=== Arch Form ===
A sectional structure based on repetition in reverse order (for example, ABCBA) that imparts an overall symmetry.

=== Berceuse ===
A French term for lullaby.

=== A Tempo ===
Term seen after a change of speed, a tempo indicates to return to the tempo played before a change of speed.

== Characteristics ==
Characteristics include a fluid sense of time, fermatas, many tenuto signs, and specific rubato instructions such as rallentando and a tempo. Additionally, you can find turns, trills, and grace notes. Shifting meters is also utilized in the B section; 6/8 to 4/8 to 5/8.

== Structure ==
Arch form. (see below )

=== Section A- Senza Misura ===
The beginning is fluid, with a cadenza-like and improvisory feeling. This section is also very florid and shows a fluidity of time. Reminiscence of the gamelan can be found both at the beginning and end: they are the whole tones and fast passages. This section is notated in real time. There are note heads without stems, and grace notes indicated with smaller font and a slash across its beam; both of these are unusual notations.

=== Section B- Quasi Berceuse ===
The tempo is quasi berceuse, or "in the style of a lullaby". This section now has metered notation. The theme has tenuto accents at the beginning of each bar, emphasizing the shifting meter in this section. 3 sharps are added in the introduction, though there is an absence of any key signature and a distinct key is still avoided. Pedal points are used in the left hand, and the E and G sharp notes are emphasized throughout the berceuse section. The time signature appears on the 3rd line and measures then begin. The pianist is directed to play with a gently rocking motion. Louie, the composer, noted that this part should have a "lovely yearning, tender quality to it." She reminds her daughters this piece should "sing in her heart".

=== Section C- Più Mosso ===
Triple meter is maintained throughout this section. The new tempo indication calls for more forward motion and there is a first appearance of homophonic texture: the melodic line presented over an arpeggiated accompaniment. There is more harmonic interest as the bass line changes to support the melodic motion.

=== Section B- A Tempo ===
Section B returns.

=== Section A- Senza Misura ===
Section A returns modified and expanded.
