= John Gilbert (Canadian actor) =

Canadian actor (1934–2021)

John Keith Gilbert (August 17, 1934 – April 22, 2021) was a Canadian actor, most noted as a Dora Mavor Moore Award nominee for Best Leading Actor (General Theatre) in 1994 for his performance as Ebenezer Scrooge in Young People's Theatre's 1993 production of A Christmas Carol.

Most prominently a stage actor, he was frequently associated with the Shaw and Stratford Festivals in Ontario. He also had supporting roles in film and television, including in the films The Adjuster, Montreal Stories (Montréal vu par...), Kumar and Mr. Jones and Eclipse.
