= Wasaga (film) =

- Directed by: Judith Doyle
- Written by: Judith Doyle
- Produced by: Judith Doyle
- Starring: Louise Lilliefeldt; Tracy Wright; Daniel MacIvor; Andrew J. Paterson
- Cinematography: Kim Derko
- Edited by: David McIntosh
- Music by: Kevin Dowler
- Production company: Reading Pictures
- Release date: September 12, 1994 (TIFF)
- Running time: 90 minutes
- Country: Canada
- Language: English

Wasaga is a 1994 Canadian drama film, directed by Judith Doyle. The film stars Louise Lilliefeldt as Rebecca, a video artist from Toronto who is working on a project in Wasaga Beach; she takes driving lessons from driving instructor Judy (Tracy Wright) because of the town's much more car-oriented lifestyle, only to find Judy becoming a love interest.

The cast also includes Daniel MacIvor as David, the gay owner of an antique store, and Andrew J. Paterson of the punk rock band The Government as an unnamed musician performing his own band's 1980 single "Flat Tire".

The film premiered at the 1994 Toronto International Film Festival. The film did not receive widespread commercial distribution, but it received a followup screening at the National Film Board of Canada's John Spotton Theatre in 1995 as part of the Women on Women screening series.

Wright was one of the runners-up for Best Actress in Take One's 1995 Toronto Film Critics Poll.
