= Alex Pauk =

- Born: October 4, 1945 (age 81); Toronto, Ontario, Canada
- Genre: Contemporary classical
- Occupations: Composer, conductor
- Years active: 1971–present
- Member of: Esprit Orchestra

Alexander Peter Pauk CM (born October 4, 1945) is a Canadian conductor and composer, most noted as the founder of the Esprit Orchestra.

== Awards and nominations ==
At the Juno Awards of 1996, both Pauk's wife Alexina Louie and Harry Freedman received Juno nominations for Classical Composition of the Year, for works they had composed for the Esprit Orchestra album Music for Heaven and Earth, and Harry Somers was nominated at the Juno Awards of 2001 for "The Third Piano Concerto", from the Esprit Orchestra album Celebration. Pauk and the Esprit Orchestra were themselves nominees for Classical Album of the Year (Large Ensemble or Soloist(s) with Large Ensemble Accompaniment) at the Juno Awards of 1998, for Tabuh-Tabuhan, Music of Colin McPhee.

In 1999, Pauk and Louie received a Genie Award nomination for Best Original Score at the 19th Genie Awards, for their work on the film Last Night.

In 2007, he was a recipient of the Canada Council's Molson Prize for distinguished achievement in the arts.

In 2014, he was inducted as a Member of the Order of Canada for his contributions to Canadian orchestral music and longstanding support and fostering of new music and early career composers.

== Compositions ==
- Fragmentations, 1971
- Fibro for viola solo, 1973
- Magaru for flute, viola and percussion, 1973
- The Scroll, 1974
- Solari, 1977
- Echo Spirit Isle, 1983
- Mirage, 1984
- Split Seconds, 1988
- Cosmos, 1988
- Concerto for Two Pianos and Orchestra, 2001
- Touch Piece, 2003
- Concerto for Harp and Orchestra, 2005

=== Film scores ===
- The Life and Times of Edwin Alonzo Boyd, 1982
- At the Wheel: Under the Influence (Facultés affaiblies), 1985
- At the Wheel: After the Crash (Sous le coup du choc), 1985
- Martha, Ruth and Edie, 1988 (with Alexina Louie)
- See No Evil, 1988 (with Louie)
- Last Night, 1988 (with Louie)
- The Five Senses, 1999 (with Louie)
- 24fps, 2000 (with Louie)
- Perfect Pie, 2002 (with Louie)
- Inside Hana's Suitcase, 2009 (with Louie)
