= Joely Collins =

Canadian actress (born 1972)

- Born: Joely Meri Bertorelli; August 8, 1972 (age 54); Vancouver, Canada
- Occupation: Actress
- Years active: 1993–present
- Spouse: Stefan Buitelaar (m. 2008)
- Children: 1
- Parent: Phil Collins (father)
- Relatives: Simon Collins (brother); Lily Collins (half-sister); Nic Collins (half-brother); Mathew Collins (half-brother); Clive Collins (uncle)

Joely Collins (née Bertorelli; born August 8, 1972) is a Canadian actress. She is the daughter of Andrea Bertorelli and English musician Phil Collins.

== Early life ==
Joely was born in Vancouver, Canada and raised in London, England. She eventually returned to Vancouver in her early teens. Collins studied at the Vancouver Youth Theatre, and later at London's Royal Academy of Dramatic Arts. She was named Canada's "Best Leading Actress" at the age of 22 for her work on the television series Madison. She appeared in numerous film and television roles, including the long-running drama Cold Squad. Collins won the award for Best Actress in a Canadian Film at the Vancouver Film Critics Circle Awards 2004 for The Love Crimes of Gillian Guess.

In 2009, she co-founded StoryLab Productions and produced the award-winning feature film Becoming Redwood. In 2015, Joely founded Million Faces Productions and produces film and television series with a focus on meaningful, character-driven stories.

After her parents married in 1975, they had son, Simon (born in 1976).

Actress Lily Collins is her half-sister, born to her father Phil Collins and his second wife Jill Tavelman after he and her mother Andrea Bertorelli divorced in 1980.

== Personal life ==
Collins married Dutch citizen Stefan Buitelaar on August 23, 2008, in Leiden, Netherlands. On October 26, 2009, Collins gave birth to their daughter, Zoë.

== Filmography ==
=== Film ===
Year	Title	Role	Notes
1995	Hideaway	Linda	
1995	Deadly Sins	Polly	
1998	Urban Safari	Girl friend	
1999	Summer Love: The Documentary	Host	
2003	Defining Edward	Anna	
2004	The Final Cut	Legz the tattoo artist	
2004	A Clown's Gift	Julie	Short film
2004	Ill Fated	Beth	
2006	Almost Heaven	Taya	
2007	Joannie Learns to Cook	Joannie	Short film
2009	Kick Me Down	Peaches	
2011	What Could Have Been	Catherine	
2012	Becoming Redwood	Social worker - Producer	
2020	Brahms: The Boy II	Mary	

=== Television ===
Year	Title	Role	Notes
1994	Madison	Rachael Langston	Episode: "Kiss of Life"
1994	Neon Rider	Barb	Recurring role (5 episodes)
1994	Moment of Truth: To Walk Again	Kelly	TV film
1995	Beauty's Revenge	Cheryl's girlfriend	TV film
1995	Action Man	Natalie	Episodes: "Explosive Situation", "Ancient History", "Rogue Moons"
1995	The New Adventures of Madeline	Additional voices	TV series
1996	Hurricanes	(voice)	Recurring role (7 episodes)
1996	Annie O	Robin	TV film
1996	Generation X	Jeannie	TV film
1996	Home Song	Erin	TV film
1996	Poltergeist: The Legacy	Emily	Episode: "Sins of the Father"
1997	Madison	Rachael Langston	Episode: "Is Jesus in the House?"
1997	North of 60	Katherine Mulcahy	Episodes: "The Smell of Violets", "A Sparrow Falls"
1998	Viper	Daph	Episode: "Breakout"
1998	Diamond Girl	Claire Barnard	TV film
1998	First Wave	Anita	Episode: "Undesirables"
1998	Da Vinci's Inquest	Sioux	Episode: "Known to the Ministry"
1999	Da Vinci's Inquest	Sioux	Episode: "Final Chapter"
1999	Night Man		Episode: "Sixty Minute Man"
1999	Our Guys: Outrage at Glen Ridge	Laurino's assistant	TV film
2000	The Dinosaur Hunter	Betty Jean	TV film
2000-2005	Cold Squad	Christine Wren	Main role (56 episodes)
2001	MythQuest	Isis	Episodes: "Isis & Osiris: Parts 1 & 2"
2004	The Love Crimes of Gillian Guess	Gillian Guess	TV film
2004	Da Vinci's Inquest	Linda Davis	Episodes: "Wash the Blood Out of the Ring", "You Promised Me a Celebrity", "First the Seducing Then the Screwing"
2005	The Dead Zone	Erica Carter	Episode: "The Collector"
2006	The Collector	Kandyse Crown	Episode: "The Spy"
2006	Northern Town	Barbara	TV series
2006	Four Extraordinary Women	Caryl	TV film
2015	Coded	Rachel	TV series
