= Michael Barry (actor) =

Canadian actor

Michael Barry is a Canadian actor known for his roles in Dawn of the Dead, Last Night and Detroit Rock City.

== Filmography ==
=== Film ===
Year	Title	Role	Note
1998	Last Night	Marty	
1998	All I Wanna Do	Possum	
1999	Detroit Rock City	Nerd	
2004	Dawn of the Dead	Bart	
2004	Sugar	Shayne	
2004	Childstar	Waiter	
2006	Skinheads	Itchy Skinhead	Short film
2006	Night Together	Dean	Short film
2008	Adoration	Skinhead	
2009	Dearest	Rick	Short film

=== Television ===
Year	Title	Role	Note
1994	Are You Afraid of the Dark?	Sam Carter	1 episode
1996	Goosebumps	Will Blake	2 episodes
1999	Foolish Heart	Avo's Friend	
2011	Air Emergency	Gary Labay	
