= Twitch City =

- Genre: Sitcom
- Starring: Don McKellar; Molly Parker; Daniel MacIvor; Callum Keith Rennie; Bruce McCulloch; Mark McKinney
- Country of origin: Canada
- No. of seasons: 2
- No. of episodes: 13

Production
- Executive producers: Susan Cavan; Armand Leo; Bruce McDonald
- Running time: 30 min.

Original release
- Network: CBC Television
- Release: January 19, 1998 – April 5, 2000

Twitch City is a Canadian sitcom produced by CBC Television, which aired as two short runs in 1998 and 2000. The series also aired in the United States on Bravo, and in Australia. The show's surreal humour was popular with critics. The show was never a mainstream ratings success in Canada, although it had a devoted cult following.

The show was directed by Bruce McDonald and produced by Shadow Shows and Accent Entertainment in association with the CBC. Music was composed by Bob Wiseman.

== Plot ==
Set in the Toronto, Ontario neighbourhood of Kensington Market, the series is about Curtis (Don McKellar), a television addict who refuses to leave his apartment, and his friends Nathan (Daniel MacIvor), Hope (Molly Parker) and Newbie (Callum Keith Rennie). McKellar was also one of the show's creators.

In the first episode, Nathan is sent to prison for killing a homeless man with a can of cat food. The homeless man was played by Al Waxman, who had been the star of the 1970s sitcom King of Kensington, although the producers claimed that they did not intend for the homeless man to be seen as the same character. Nathan remained in prison throughout the run of the series; the first episode of the second season opened with an Oz parody in which he criticized the hip hop-inspired slam poetry of his cellmate.

Throughout the series, Curtis and Hope's ongoing attempts to find a new roommate to replace Nathan provide one of the show's major plot threads. In one episode, Curtis rents Nathan's room to a mysterious businessman who uses it to store drugged cookies, while in another, Hope unwittingly rents it to two Neo-Nazis she mistakes for a gay couple. That episode includes a Nazi rally which features all four members of the rock band Sloan among the extras. At the end of the episode, the two Nazi roommates renounce Nazism and promptly kiss each other, vindicating Hope's judgement.

Bruce McCulloch and Mark McKinney (both from The Kids in the Hall) also starred in the series as Rex Reilly, the Jerry Springer-like host of Curtis' favourite TV talk show. McCulloch played Reilly in the first season, and McKinney played him in the second. The change in Reilly's appearance is explained in his autobiography, Tyrannosaurus Rex, which refers to his "on-air cranium transplant."

Guest stars on the series included Jennifer Jason Leigh, Tom McCamus, Valerie Buhagiar, Charmion King, Kenneth Welsh, Hugh Dillon, Kim Mitchell, Stefan Brogren, John L'Ecuyer and Joyce DeWitt. DeWitt plays herself as a guest on The Rex Reilly Show, meeting lookalikes in an episode devoted to the theme "I Look Like Joyce DeWitt".

== DVD release ==
All thirteen episodes were released on DVD in 2006.

== Episodes ==
Most episodes of the series are titled for the theme of the Rex Reilly Show episode depicted in the script.

=== Season 1 (1998) ===
No.	Title	Original release date	Prod. code
1	"I Slept With My Mother"	January 19, 1998	1-01
2	"My Pet, My Hero"	January 26, 1998	1-02
3	"I Look Like Joyce DeWitt"	February 2, 1998	1-03
4	"People Who Fight Too Much"	February 23, 1998	1-04
5	"I'm Fat and I'm Proud"	March 2, 1998	1-05
6	"Killed by Cat Food"	March 9, 1998	1-06

=== Season 2 (2000) ===
No.	Title	Original release date	Prod. code
7	"The Return of the Cat Food Killer"	March 15, 2000	2-01
8	"Shinto Death Cults"	March 22, 2000	2-02
9	"Klan Bake"	March 22, 2000	2-03
10	"People Who Don't Care About Anything"	March 29, 2000	2-04
11	"The Planet of the Cats"	March 29, 2000	2-05
12	"The Life of Reilly"	April 5, 2000	2-06
13	"Angels All Week"	April 5, 2000	2-07
