= When Night Is Falling =

When Night is Falling
- Poster
- Directed by: Patricia Rozema
- Written by: Patricia Rozema
- Produced by: Barbara Tranter
- Starring: Pascale Bussières; Rachael Crawford; Don McKellar; Tracy Wright; David Fox; Henry Czerny
- Cinematography: Douglas Koch
- Edited by: Susan Shipton
- Music by: Lesley Barber
- Production companies: Alliance Communications; Crucial Pictures
- Distributed by: October Films
- Release date: May 5, 1995 (Canada)
- Running time: 94 minutes
- Country: Canada
- Language: English

When Night is Falling is a 1995 Canadian drama film directed by Patricia Rozema and starring Pascale Bussières and Rachael Crawford. It was entered into the 45th Berlin International Film Festival.

== Plot ==
Camille Baker (Pascale Bussières) is a university literature professor at a religious college in a long-term relationship with fellow professor Martin (Henry Czerny). When her dog runs away and she finds him dead on the street, she ends up crying in the middle of the laundromat where she is approached by Petra (Rachael Crawford), who comforts her.

Later on, Camille realizes that her laundry was mixed up with Petra's, and finds a business card inside the laundry bag. Going to return Petra's clothes, she finds that Petra is a circus performer. When she goes to Petra's trailer to retrieve her clothes, Petra tells her that she would like to sleep with her. Confused and uncomfortable, Camille grabs her clothes and leaves.

Petra later tracks Camille down and shoots an arrow through her window with a picture of herself and her phone number attached. Camille invites Petra inside and ends up kissing her before running away.

Camille and Martin are being groomed to take over for the university chaplain, with the chaplain hinting heavily that they must marry in order to be promoted. At the interview, Camille refuses to denounce homosexuality as a sin, and when asked what she would do if a male student came to her for advice on being attracted to another man, Camille cannot answer the question. Martin believes that Camille is acting unusual on purpose because of her discomfort over their future marriage, and embraces her. They are seen by Petra, who was waiting outside Camille's office.

Afterwards Camille goes to see Petra, ostensibly to ask Petra to stop following her, but instead ends up asking her to become her friend after telling her that the kiss was a mistake.

Petra takes Camille hang-gliding, and though Camille is initially reluctant to participate, Petra urges her onward by telling her that night is falling and they will miss their chance if they don't hurry. While hang gliding, Camille ends up injuring her knee.

Petra takes Camille home and then massages her, with the massage quickly turning sexual as Petra unbuttons her blouse and takes off Camille's bra. They are interrupted by the university chaplain (David Fox) visiting Camille. Camille passes Petra off as an acquaintance, and when she refuses to leave, excuses her to the chaplain by saying she is a disturbed street kid. Petra leaves in anger.

Camille goes to Martin's house, where she has sex with him. However, when Martin leaves to go to a conference, Camille cannot stop herself from fantasizing about Petra, and goes to the circus to see her, where the two have sex.

Camille goes to the chaplain seeking guidance, and he is more understanding than she anticipated. She goes to the circus where Petra and the rest of the performers are celebrating an invitation to Circumstance, a festival for Circus performers. She and Petra begin a relationship and they discuss the possibility of Camille joining Petra in the circus.

Meanwhile, Martin, who has returned from his trip, waits for Camille in her home, and finds the picture of Petra with her number written on it. He goes to the circus and sees Camille and Petra naked in the trailer. After Camille leaves without seeing him, he introduces himself to Petra and then leaves, but not before hitting the outside of her trailer in anger, scaring Petra.

Camille meanwhile heads home to break up with Martin, and is surprised to find him already there. He urges her to think before she speaks, telling her that they have a good relationship and suggesting that her passion for Petra will fade. Thinking things over, Camille heads into the woods to finally bury her dead dog, whom she had kept in the fridge until that point. After burying the dog, she begins drinking and passes out in a snowbank.

Camille is found by the hang gliders who had joined her and Petra on their first outing as friends. They call Petra and she rushes to Camille's side, wrapping her body around her and trying to revive her. Once revived, Camille joins Petra and the circus on their way to Circumstance. The director of the circus (Tracy Wright), who had dreamed of running away, stays in the city where she and Martin spot each other outside a café.

== Cast ==
- Pascale Bussières as Camille Baker
- Rachael Crawford as Petra Soft
- Henry Czerny as Martin
- David Fox as Reverend DeBoer
- Don McKellar as Timothy
- Tracy Wright as Tory
- Clare Coulter as Tillie
- Karyne Steben as Trapeze Artist #1
- Sarah Steben as Trapeze Artist #2
- Jonathan Potts as Hang Glider #1
- Tom Melissis as Hang Glider #2
- Stuart Clow as Hang Glider #3
- Richard W. Farrell as Board President
- Fides Krucker as Roaring Woman
- Thom Sokoloski as Man with Goatee

== Release ==
When Night is Falling gained publicity in Canada when The Globe and Mail pulled advertising for the film featuring an image of two women almost kissing. It opened on 4 screens in Canada on May 5, 1995. It was given the NC-17 rating by the MPAA, though it surrendered the rating; it was then released with no rating. The film was later released onto video with two versions: the original unrated version, and an R rated cut. The film makers appealed the NC-17 rating because of the highly negative stigma associated with NC-17 rated films at the time, and because the NC-17 rating restricted the distribution and actual sales of such movies. The appeal, however, was declined, so When Night is Falling was released unrated.

== Reception ==
=== Critical reception ===
When Night is Falling received mixed reviews: Siskel & Ebert both gave it "thumbs down"; while Rotten Tomatoes reports an approval rating of 53% based on 17 reviews, with a weighted average of 5.7/10.

AfterEllen's review was that "this movie is certainly a must see," with "gorgeous cinematography, elegant and symbolic references to mythology and a deliciously satisfying sex scene between two feminine women with amazing chemistry." Re-examined 11 years later, the AfterEllen reviewer declared it, "one of the worst movies I have ever loved with a full-hearted, unconstrained passion. It has virtually no redeeming qualities, and yet I challenge even the most intellectually rigorous critic not to delight in it."

In 2010, Curve placed it number 3 on a list of six lesbian movies to swoon over.

=== Box office ===
The film grossed $32,835 in its opening weekend in Canada.

== See also ==
- List of LGBT films directed by women
