= Joe's So Mean to Josephine =

- Directed by: Peter Wellington
- Written by: Peter Wellington
- Produced by: Susan Cavan
- Starring: Eric Thal; Sarah Polley
- Cinematography: Adam Swica
- Edited by: Roushell Goldstein; Jeff Warren
- Music by: Ron Sures
- Production company: Accent Two
- Distributed by: Alliance Communications
- Release date: November 15, 1996
- Running time: 89 minutes
- Country: Canada
- Language: English

Joe's So Mean to Josephine is a 1996 Canadian romantic drama film written and directed by Peter Wellington in his directorial debut. The film stars Eric Thal and Sarah Polley as Joe and Josephine, a couple that enters a romantic relationship despite the significant differences and incompatibilities.

The film's cast also includes Don McKellar, Waneta Storms, Jason Cadieux, Tracy Wright, Semi Chellas, Dixie Seatle and Rachel Luttrell.

At the 17th Genie Awards, Ron Sures was nominated for Best Original Score, and the film won that year's Claude Jutra Award for the best Canadian feature film by a first-time director.
