= Childstar (film) =

- Directed by: Don McKellar
- Written by: Don McKellar; Michael Goldbach
- Produced by: Niv Fichman; Daniel Iron; Jennifer Jonas
- Starring: Jennifer Jason Leigh; Don McKellar; Mark Rendall; Michael Murphy
- Cinematography: André Turpin
- Edited by: Reginald Harkema
- Music by: Christopher Dedrick
- Production company: Rhombus Media
- Distributed by: TVA Films; America Video Film; Hart Sharp Video
- Release date: September 10, 2004 (Toronto International Film Festival)
- Running time: 98 minutes
- Country: Canada
- Language: English

Childstar is a 2004 Canadian comedy film directed and co-written by Don McKellar, and starring McKellar, Peter Paige, Gil Bellows, Mark Rendall, Michael Murphy, with Jennifer Jason Leigh, and Alan Thicke. It premiered at the Toronto International Film Festival and received four awards from the Vancouver Film Critics Circle, including Best Canadian Film.

== Plot ==
Taylor Brandon Burns, who happens to be America's most famous child star, is in Canada to shoot a big-budget action film. Wanting to get away from his stage mom Suzanne and the pressures of show business, he runs off set with a fellow actress, Natalie. The film's producers, concerned with the money they are losing due to a delayed shooting schedule, enlist Rick Schiller, a down-on-his-luck indie filmmaker and Taylor's reluctant limo-driver, to find the boy.

== Cast ==
- Don McKellar as Rick Schiller
- Peter Paige as Tim
- Gil Bellows as Isaac
- Alan Thicke as J.R.
- Mark Rendall as Taylor Brandon Burns
- Jennifer Jason Leigh as Suzanne Burns
- Michael Murphy as Reed Harrison
- Brendan Fehr as Chip Metzger
- Dave Foley as Philip Templeman
- Wendy Lyon as Miss Kelly
- Kristin Adams as Natalie
- Michael Barry as Waiters

== Production ==
Director and co-writer Don McKellar said he got the idea for the film when he was at an Oscars party and found himself talking to actor Haley Joel Osment, who was then hot off the success of The Sixth Sense. Said McKellar, "He seemed to perfectly encapsulate American stardom…He was preternaturally mature, extremely young but unnatural." McKellar said the encounter was a "a potent symbol...of my experience of Hollywood. He was an unnaturally precocious kid in a culture where kids act too old and adults act too young." McKellar envisioned a lighter take on a child star story and took his idea to Michael Goldbach, then a writer at the Canadian Film Centre.

Filming took place in Toronto from November to December 2003.

== Reception ==
=== Release ===
Childstar had its world premiere at the Toronto International Film Festival in September 2004. It was eventually acquired by The Sundance Channel, where it had its TV premiere in 2006.

=== Critical reception ===
On review aggregator Rotten Tomatoes, Childstar has an approval rating of 78% based on 9 reviews.

Ian Mackenzie of Exclaim! wrote the film "goes to great lengths to humanise and sympathise with its namesake, asking questions about mass media's consumption of child performers rich and famous in a day, then tabloid-fodder for the rest of their lives", adding it "never misses an opportunity for a smart joke or a poignant observation at the expense of someone who thinks they know better."

Writing for CinemaBlend, Rafe Telsch gave the film four out of five stars and praised McKellar for bringing a new perspective to the story of a child star. He also lauded the film's satirical commentary on American films that use Canada for filming locations.

=== Accolades ===
Childstar received four awards from the Vancouver Film Critics Circle, including Best Canadian Film, Best Director, Best Actor for McKellar and Best Supporting Actor for Dave Foley.

It was nominated for five Genie Awards, with Jennifer Jason Leigh winning for Actress in a Supporting Role.

== Home media ==
The region 1 DVD was released September 13, 2005. The DVD includes an audio commentary track and a making-of featurette.

As of 2017, the movie has been released online for free on Canada Media Fund's Encore+ YouTube Channel.
