= Tine Van Aerschot =

Belgian artist

- Born: 1961 (age 64–65); Mechelen, Belgium

Tine Van Aerschot (born 1961, Mechelen) is a Belgian graphic designer, writer and theatre director.

== Early collaborations ==
After studying visual arts and computer graphics, Tine Van Aerschot started working in theatre in 1987 at the STUK arts centre and the dance festival Klapstuk in Leuven, Belgium. She was the production assistant on Disfigure Study (1991), the debut choreography by the American choreographer Meg Stuart. From 1999 to 2004, Van Aerschot was the graphic designer for Stuart's dance company, Damaged Goods.

She was also the production assistant for the American choreographer Dennis O'Connor (Amor Omnia, 1993) and the dramatic adviser for the Belgian choreographer Christine De Smedt (L'union fait la force fait l'union, 1993 and de Hemelschutters). She also worked as a photographer on Too Shy to Stare (2003) by the American performance artist Davis Freeman, and as the scenographer for Private Rooms (2002), a dance performance by the Canadian choreographer Sara Chase. She worked as the artistic advisor and graphic designer for the New Zealand dance and performance artist Simone Aughterlony on her pieces Public Property (2004) and Performers on Trial (2005) and as the co-author and advisor on Bare Back Lying (2006). She also designed leaflets, posters and websites for various dance and theatre productions and companies.

== Artistic career ==
Tine Van Aerschot began developing her own work in 2002. It originally revolved around her alter ego Trevor Wells, and began with a series of emails, followed by a multimedia project - all under the title The Wherebouts of Trevor Wells. With her visual work she participated in the group exhibition A room or one's own (de Markten, Brussels, 2006 and Kunstlerhaus Betanien, Berlin, 2007). From 2006, this was followed by a series of theatre texts and theatre productions, first produced by Palindroom vzw, a production structure that she shared with film artist Els Van Riel, and subsequently by TREVOR vzw, her own production structure.

In November 2008, Tine Van Aerschot presented a workshop on Meaning of Text in Contemporary Performance at the invitation of the Royal Scottish Academy of Music and Drama in Glasgow. In April 2009 she tutored students in a workshop on text and dramaturgy at the invitation of the APT Hogeschool (Utrecht).

In 2017, Tine Van Aerschot moved from Brussels to Ostend, where she became artist-in-residence at the De Grote Post cultural centre during the 2017-2018 season. During the season 2018-2019, she organised De Klas van Tine (The Class of Tine), a series of evenings during which she talks with a guest "about life and death, about new life and maintaining existing life, about the profane and the human."

== Theatre productions ==
- I have no thoughts and this is one of them (2006), a monologue in the form of a summary, a worldview built on only denials.
- Triple Trooper Trevor Trumpet Girl (2009), a theatre piece with two actresses in the form of a failed diary full of questions and concerns about everything and nothing.
- We are not afraid of the dark (2012), a monologue about survival and therefore also about dying.
- When in doubt, duck (2015), a performance featuring two actresses and an actor inspired by the translations, rephrasings and infinite flow of multimedia information that floods society.
- Het betreft liefde (2018), a performance with three actresses based on conversations with children and adults about their love experiences, and on remarkable love stories from history and literature.

== Publications ==
The theatre texts of Tine Van Aerschot are published at De Nieuwe Toneelbibliotheek (Amsterdam). In 2013, De Nieuwe Toneelbibliotheek also published her book A Partial Exposure of A Half Decent Elephant.

Published theatre texts

- I have no thoughts and this is one of them (Tine Van Aerschot, 2006, De Nieuwe Toneelbibliotheek #111)
- Triple Trooper Trevor Trompet girl (Tine Van Aerschot, 2008, De Nieuwe Toneelbibliotheek #110)
- We are not afraid of the dark (Tine Van Aerschot, 2012, De Nieuwe Toneelbibliotheek #222)
- When in doubt, duck (Tine Van Aerschot, 2015, De Nieuwe Toneelbibliotheek #299)
- Het betreft: liefde (Tine Van Aerschot, 2018, De Nieuwe Toneelbibliotheek #456)

Other book publications

- A Partial Exposure of A Half Decent Elephant (Tine Van Aerschot, 2013, De Nieuwe Toneelbibliotheek#199)

In 2015, Van Aerschot, with her production structure TREVOR vzw, re-released the 2004 book Zjefke in de Grote Oorlog (Zjefke in the Great War) (ISBN 9789090183312) by her father André Van Aerschot. She received the support of the Kaaitheater and the KU Leuven; the then rector Rik Torfs of the KU Leuven wrote the new preface. The proceeds of the sale went to Vluchtelingenwerk Vlaanderen.
