= All Hat =

2007 Canadian Western comedy film

- Directed by: Leonard Farlinger
- Written by: Brad Smith
- Based on: All Hat by Brad Smith
- Produced by: Jennifer Jonas
- Starring: Luke Kirby; Stephen McHattie; Keith Carradine; Noam Jenkins; Lisa Ray; Rachael Leigh Cook
- Cinematography: Paul Sarossy
- Edited by: Glenn Berman
- Music by: Bill Frisell
- Production company: New Real Films
- Distributed by: Odeon Films (Canada); Screen Media Ventures
- Release date: September 11, 2007 (TIFF)
- Running time: 89 minutes
- Country: Canada
- Language: English
- Budget: C$5,000,000
- Box office: $15,198

All Hat is a 2007 Canadian Western comedy film directed by Leonard Farlinger and starring Luke Kirby, Keith Carradine, Noam Jenkins, and Lisa Ray. It was written by Brad Smith, based on his novel of the same name.

== Plot ==
Ray Dokes is fresh out of prison. Returning home to rural Ontario, he discovers the countryside of his youth transformed. Urban development crawls across the pastoral fields like a rash. Determined to stay out of trouble, Ray heads to the farm of his old friend Pete, a Texan cowboy, whose debts are growing faster than his corn.

Sonny Stanton, the heir to a thoroughbred dynasty, is buying the entire concession of farmland to build a golf course. One of the farms he's after belongs to Etta Parr, Ray's old flame. Seems she's the only one brave enough to stand in Sonny's way.

Ray hooks up with Chrissie Nugent, a kick-ass jockey and tries to steer clear of Sonny. When a million-dollar thoroughbred goes missing from the Stanton Stables, Sonny gets desperate and forces the sale of the community's remaining farms. Ray reacts by coming up with a scheme to stop Sonny once and for all. One false move will land Ray back in jail.

== Cast ==
- Luke Kirby as Ray Dokes
- Stephen McHattie as Earl Stanton
- Keith Carradine as Pete Culpepper
- Noam Jenkins as Sonny Stanton
- Lisa Ray as Etta Parr
- Rachael Leigh Cook as Chrissie Nugent
- David Alpay as Paulie Stanton
- Ernie Hudson as Jackson Jones
- Joel Keller as Dean Calder
- Graham Greene as Jim Burns
- Gary Farmer as Billy Caan
- Michelle Nolden as Gena Stanton

== Production ==
All Hat was filmed in several Canadian locations:

- Ontario
- Fort Erie, Ontario and its racetrack
- Hamilton, Ontario

== Release and reception ==
On review aggregator website Rotten Tomatoes, the film has a rating of 20% based on 5 critics, with an average rating of 4.3/10.

The film premiered on September 11, 2007 at the Toronto International Film Festival, and was shown at the Okanagan Film Festival on April 19, 2008. It was released direct-to-DVD in North America on May 27, 2008.

All Hat earned only $15,198 on a budget of $CAD5,000,000.
