= Roadkill (1989 film) =

- Directed by: Bruce McDonald
- Screenplay by: Don McKellar
- Story by: Bruce McDonald
- Produced by: Colin Brunton; Bruce McDonald
- Starring: Valerie Buhagiar; Larry Hudson; Bruce McDonald; Don McKellar; Shaun Bowring
- Cinematography: Miroslaw Baszak
- Edited by: Mike Munn
- Music by: Nash the Slash
- Distributed by: Shadow Shows Incorporated (Canada)
- Release date: September 1989 (Toronto)
- Running time: 85 minutes
- Country: Canada
- Language: English

Roadkill is a 1989 Canadian road film directed by Bruce McDonald, in his directorial film debut, from a screenplay written by Don McKellar. It stars Valerie Buhagiar as a woman tracking down a missing band across Northern Ontario, meeting a variety of eccentric characters along the way.

The film premiered at the 1989 Toronto International Film Festival, where it won the award for Best Canadian Film. Roadkill is considered one of the essential works of the Toronto New Wave movement.

== Plot ==
Ramona, an intern at a Toronto record label, is sent to Sudbury by promoter Roy Seth to track down the label's star band, Children of Paradise, after they disappear on tour. Because she doesn't know how to drive, however, she takes a taxi driven by Buddy for the entire 400-km route.

Once in Sudbury, she finds the band almost immediately, but then loses them again and subsequently tracks them all across Northern Ontario. On her way, she encounters a variety of odd characters — including an indie film director named Bruce Shack, who documents roadkill on the highway, and an aspiring serial killer named Russell, who has studied the profession thoroughly but just does not know where to start.

Ramona finally locates the band in Thunder Bay, setting the stage for the film's climax.

== Cast ==
- Valerie Buhagiar as Ramona
- Gerry Quigley as Roy Seth
- Larry Hudson as Buddy
- Bruce McDonald as Bruce Shack
- Shaun Bowring as Matthew
- Don McKellar as Russell
- Mark Tarantino as Luke

Music is a large part of the film, and there are cameos by musicians Nash the Slash performing onstage, Leslie Spit Treeo busking on a stretch of land, and Joey Ramone appearing as himself. Shaun Bowring of Teknakuller Raincoats, who appear on the soundtrack, also appears in the film as Mathew, the lead singer of Children of Paradise.

Ramona's parents are played by Valerie's own parents, Nazareno and Giovanna Buhagiar. The bar patron who picks the pocket of the Apocalypse Club Manager after he gets shot is played by the film's producer, Colin Brunton.

== Production ==
The film was inspired by the Toronto rock band A Neon Rome. McDonald's original idea was to make a concert film following that band on tour; however, the band's lead singer, Neal Arbik, became disillusioned with the demands of touring to promote the band's debut album. His behaviour became increasingly erratic and rebellious over the course of the tour, and he ultimately quit the music industry before the film — or the band's second album — could be made.

Instead, the film became a fictionalized portrayal of A Neon Rome, depicting a band on the verge of collapsing in a similar manner.

== Soundtrack album ==
The film's soundtrack album includes a mix of songs mostly by Canadian rock artists, but also including a track by The Ramones — and snippets of dialogue from the film:

1. "White Lines" I.T.
2. "Hinterland" (0:50)
3. "Instant Death" (2:58)
4. "Mr. Shack Explains" (0:06)
5. Leslie Spit Treeo, "The Sound" (2:37)
6. "Ramona on the Road" (0:23)
7. Graeme Kirkland and the Wolves (feat. Julie Masi), "Street People" (4:51)
8. "Spiritual Quest" (0:09)
9. Suffer Machine, "Nostradamus" (2:44)
10. The Ugly Ducklings, "She Ain't No Use to Me" (3:14)
11. "Russell the Serial Killer" (0:30)
12. Handsome Ned and the Sidewinders, "Put the Blame on Me" (3:05)
13. Steve Munro, "The Weenie Boy Song" (0:40)
14. Ten Seconds Over Tokyo, "Burning Rain" (3:53)
15. "Thangst for the Angst/Buddy and Biff" (1:02)
16. The Paupers, "Magic People" (2:39)
17. "Luke" (0:40)
18. Teknakuller Raincoats, "Dancing Cadavers" (2:56)
19. "The Driving Lessons" (0:29)
20. Rita Chiarelli, "Have You Seen My Shoes?" (3:34)
21. The Razorbacks, "It's Saturday Night" (3:06)
22. "Joey Say Hey" (0:29)
23. Ramones, "Howling at the Moon (Sha-La-La)" (3:28)
24. "Ramona Gets Ready" (0:19)
25. Nash the Slash, "Roadkill" (2:35)
26. "Weenie Boy Reprise" (0:22)

== Reception ==
In a review of the film's soundtrack album, the website AllMusic calls the film "an increasingly weird mix of Heart of Darkness and The Wizard of Oz".

=== Awards and nominations ===
Roadkill won the Toronto-City Award for Best Canadian Feature Film at the 1989 Toronto International Film Festival. Don McKellar was also nominated for two 1990 Genie Awards, for Best Supporting Actor, and Best Original Screenplay.
