= Eclipse (1994 film) =

- Directed by: Jeremy Podeswa
- Written by: Jeremy Podeswa
- Produced by: Jeremy Podeswa; Camelia Frieberg
- Starring: Von Flores; Pascale Montpetit; Matthew Ferguson
- Cinematography: Mirolsaw Baszak
- Edited by: Susan Maggi
- Music by: Ernie Toller
- Production companies: Fire Dog Films; Malofilm
- Distributed by: Strand Releasing
- Release date: September 1994 (TIFF)
- Running time: 95 minutes
- Country: Canada
- Language: English

Eclipse is a Canadian drama film, written and directed by Jeremy Podeswa and released in 1994.

== Plot ==
Set in Toronto during the two-week period leading up to a total eclipse of the sun, the film revolves around ten characters of varying sexual orientations whose urban lifestyles are marked by emotional and social disconnection from others. Against the backdrop of the media circus surrounding the rare celestial event, each of the ten characters struggles to connect with others through a chain of sexual encounters, with each new encounter involving one of the two partners from the previous one. The film also blends both black-and-white and colour cinematography, with the establishing scenes about the eclipse shot in colour and the sexual interactions filmed in black and white.

== Release ==
The film premiered at the 1994 Toronto International Film Festival.

== Cast ==
- Von Flores ... Henry
- John Gilbert ... Brian
- Pascale Montpetit ... Sylvie
- Manuel Aranguiz ... Gabriel
- Maria del Mar ... Sarah
- Greg Ellwand ... Norman
- Matthew Ferguson ... Angelo
- Earl Pastko ... Michael
- Daniel MacIvor ... Jim
- Kirsten Johnson ... Carlotta
- Ian Orr ... Professor

== Critical response ==
Jay Stone of the Southam newspaper chain wrote that "Jeremy Podeswa's Eclipse is the kind of film that gives pretentious, sophomoric symbolism the bad reputation it labors under these days. It's difficult to know how seriously to take this movie. It's either a study of the emptiness of the modern world and the banality of casual sex, or a Second City TV parody of Canadian cinema."

Rick Groen of The Globe and Mail wrote that "the movie's success hinges on whether these essentially bleak interludes possess any dramatic conviction, whether the many psychological blackouts are as resonant as their astronomical equivalent. Some are. Aided by Podeswa's flair for elliptical dialogue, and buoyed by a strong ensemble cast (notably Pascale Montpetit as the maid and Matthew Ferguson as the teen), a few of the encounters strike allusive sparks, lighting up the welter of conflicting emotions that lurk just beneath the sexual act. But, like the copulators themselves, other scenes just lie there, prone and dull - we don't really know these people, we don't really care. And the pointed-to climax, when the narrative completes its prescribed circle and the sun does its disappearing number, is short on punctuating power - not weak, exactly, but less than emphatic."

For the Vancouver Sun, Lloyd Dykk wrote that "The even tempo to the scenes and a sound track of Indian ragas and wailing Moorish chants have a cool, hypnotic effect and the movie has a feeling of effortlessness. There is also considerable wit to the script and some clever visual punning, as when an image of the sun's blazing corona dissolves into the scorched holes that Sylvie burns into a napkin with her bored cigarette. But the strain of forcing together this chain of interactions does betray itself. The script seems to borrow the device of the brilliant Austrian Arthur Schnitzler's 1891 play, Anatol, whose chain of desultory pairings had the effect of atomic fission, adding up to a human meaning that was exponentially greater than its parts. In Eclipse, you're too conscious of how schematically imposed the device is and Podeswa doesn't divert us with enough information about the characters' lives."

== Awards and nominations ==
At the 16th Genie Awards, Ferguson was nominated for Best Actor and Montpetit was nominated for Best Supporting Actress.

== See also ==
- List of films featuring eclipses
