= Mirosław Baszak =

Canadian cinematographer

- Born: Poland
- Occupation: Cinematographer

Mirosław Baszak is a Polish-born Canadian cinematographer.

== Early life, family and education ==
Baszak was born in Poland. He studied history and theory at University of Łódź.

In the early 1980s, he emigrated to Germany and then in 1983 to Canada. Thereafter, he attended Ryerson Polytechnical Institute's film course in 1984.

== Career ==
In Poland, Baszak acted and worked in theatre. He has collaborated on over 30 Canadian and American feature films, as well as many commercials and music videos. Baszak's work includes Pontypool, Trailer Park Boys: The Movie, Land of the Dead and The Boondock Saints II: All Saints Day.

== Award nominations ==
- 2008 Genie Award for Best Achievement in Cinematography for Shake Hands with the Devil
- 1999 Canadian Society of Cinematographers Award for Best Cinematography in a TV series for Rescuers: Stories of Courage: Two Families
