= Don McKellar =

Canadian actor, screenwriter and film director (born 1963)

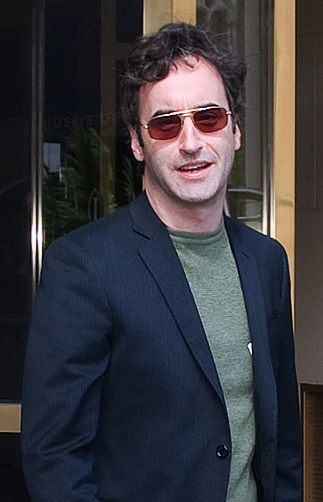
- McKellar at the 2009 Toronto International Film Festival
- Born: August 17, 1963 (age 63); Toronto, Ontario, Canada
- Education: University of Toronto
- Occupations: Actor, writer, filmmaker
- Years active: 1986–present
- Spouse: Tracy Wright (m. 2010; died 2010)

Don McKellar CM (born August 17, 1963) is a Canadian actor, writer, playwright, and filmmaker. He was part of a loosely-affiliated group of filmmakers to emerge from Toronto known as the Toronto New Wave.

He is known for directing and writing the film Last Night, which won the Prix de la Jeunesse at the 1998 Cannes Film Festival, as well as his screenplays for films such as Thirty Two Short Films About Glenn Gould, The Red Violin, Blindness, and No Other Choice. McKellar frequently acts in his own projects, and has also appeared in Atom Egoyan's Exotica and David Cronenberg's eXistenZ and Crimes of the Future.

He is also known for being a fixture on Canadian television, with series including Twitch City, Odd Job Jack, and Slings & Arrows, as well as writing the book for the popular Tony Award-winning musical The Drowsy Chaperone. He is an eight-time nominee and two-time Genie Award winner.

== Early life and education ==
Don McKellar was born in Toronto, Ontario, Canada, the son of Marjorie Kay (Stirrett), a teacher, and John Duncan McKellar, a corporate lawyer. He attended Glenview Senior Public School, Lawrence Park Collegiate Institute and later studied English at the University of Toronto's Victoria College.

== Career ==
McKellar was a founding member of Toronto's Augusta Company, along with his future wife Tracy Wright and Daniel Brooks.

McKellar made his first screen appearance in 1989 in Bruce McDonald's film Roadkill, for which he also wrote the screenplay, earning Genie Award nominations for best supporting actor and best screenwriter, attracting the attention of many in Canada. Roadkill also won the Toronto-Citytv Award for best Canadian feature. McKellar collaborated again with McDonald for his 1991 film Highway 61, writing the screenplay and starring as the barber Pokey Jones. McKellar's work again solicited wide praise, earning him a second Genie nomination for best screenwriter and a nomination for best actor. McKellar and McDonald also spawned the cult classic television series Twitch City, in which McKellar starred as Curtis, a television addict and shut-in.

Since his entry into Canadian cinema, McKellar has been involved in numerous projects. He appeared in Atom Egoyan's films The Adjuster (1991) and Exotica (1994), the latter of which earned him the Genie for best supporting actor. McKellar collaborated with François Girard, authoring the screenplays for his films Thirty Two Short Films About Glenn Gould (1992) and the Academy Award winning (Best Original Score) The Red Violin (1998), in which McKellar starred alongside Samuel L. Jackson. He also appeared alongside Jude Law and Jennifer Jason Leigh in David Cronenberg's 1999 film eXistenZ. In 2008, he wrote and co-starred in the screen adaptation of José Saramago's 1995 novel Blindness.

McKellar is also a filmmaker in his own right; his directorial debut, Last Night (1998), which he also wrote and starred in, garnered impressive critical acclaim, winning the Prix de la Jeunesse at the Cannes Film Festival and the Claude Jutra Award at the Genies. His second film, Childstar, opened in 2004 at the Toronto International Film Festival to enthusiastic reviews.

On television, McKellar played Oliver Tapscrew in the 2001 TV children's drama series I Was a Rat. He also starred for four seasons in The Comedy Network animated sitcom Odd Job Jack (2003–2007) as the titular hero Jack Ryder. In 2006, he appeared in Ken Finkleman's miniseries At the Hotel, received a Gemini Award nomination for his role as socialist politician Clarence Fines in Prairie Giant: The Tommy Douglas Story and hosted the CBC Radio One series High Definition.

McKellar appeared in all three seasons of television's Slings & Arrows as theatre director Darren Nichols. The show is co-written by Bob Martin, his collaborator on the musical The Drowsy Chaperone, for which McKellar won the 2006 Tony Award for Best Book of a Musical and the Drama Desk Award for Outstanding Book of a Musical. Martin and McKellar also cocreated the Canadian television sitcom Michael, Tuesdays and Thursdays, which debuted on CBC Television in fall 2011.

In 2016, McKellar was made a Member of the Order of Canada "for his contributions to Canadian culture as an actor, writer and director".

Alongside fellow showrunner Park Chan-wook, McKellar was expelled from the Writers Guild of America in August 2025 for strikebreaking. Park and McKellar had crossed WGA picket lines by continuing to write for their HBO miniseries The Sympathizer during the 2023 writer's strike. Both now appear on the WGA financial core list due to the expulsion.

== Personal life ==
McKellar married his longtime partner, Canadian actress Tracy Wright, on January 3, 2010. Wright died of cancer on June 22, 2010.

== Filmography ==
=== Film ===
Year	Title	Role	Notes
1989	Roadkill	Russel, the Serial Killer	Also writer
1991	The Adjuster	Tyler - The Young Censor	
1991	Highway 61	Pokey Jones	Also writer
1992	Giant Steps	Real Estate Hucker	
1992	Blue	—N/a	Short film; director and writer
1993	Thirty Two Short Films About Glenn Gould	Concert Promoter	Also writer
1993	Coleslaw Warehouse	—N/a	Short film
1994	Exotica	Thomas	
1994	Camilla	Security Guard	
1994	Arrowhead	Ray Bud	Short film; Mockumentary
1994	Dance Me Outside	—N/a	Writer
1995	When Night Is Falling	Timothy	
1996	Never Met Picasso	Jerry	
1996	Joe's So Mean to Josephine	Mike	
1997	Bach Cello Suite #4: Sarabande	Max	Short film
1998	Last Night	Patrick Wheeler	Also writer and director
1998	The Red Violin	Evan Williams	Also writer
1998	Elimination Dance	Male Dance Partner	Short film; also writer and director
1998	The Herd	Himself	Documentary
1999	Existenz	Yevgeny Nourish	
2000	waydowntown	Brad	
2000	You Tell Me	—N/a	Short film
2000	This Might Be Good	Projectionist	Short film
2000	A Word from the Management	—N/a	Short film; writer and director
2001	The Art of Woo	Nathan	
2003	The Event	Matt Shapiro	
2003	Public Domain	Host	
2004	Clean	Vernon	
2004	Childstar	Rick Shiller - the driver	Also writer and director
2005	Where the Truth Lies	Publishing Executive	
2006	Monkey Warfare	Dan	
2007	Redacted	Criminal Investigator (voice)	
2008	Blindness	Thief	Also writer
2008	Green Door	Ron	Short film
2009	Cooking with Stella	Michael Laffont	
2010	Scott Pilgrim vs. the World	Director	
2010	Trigger	Brian	
2010	This Movie Is Broken	—N/a	Writer
2011	I'm Yours	Phil	
2013	The Grand Seduction	—N/a	Director
2013	Treading Water	Richard	
2013	3 Days in Havana	Pepe	
2015	Zoom	Horowitz (voice)	
2016	Window Horses	Dietmar (voice)	
2017	Blood Honey	Dr. Bert Morrison	
2017	Meditation Park	Gabriel	
2018	Through Black Spruce	Journalist	Also director
2019	American Woman	Newscaster	
2020	Target Number One	Norm	
2020	The Curse of Audrey Earnshaw	Bernard Buckley	
2021	The Middle Man	Doctor	
2022	Crimes of the Future	Wippet	
2025	No Other Choice	—N/a	Writer

=== Television ===
Year	Title	Role	Notes
1994	RoboCop	Dr. Newlove	Episode: "Zone Five"
1995	Side Effects	Elaine's Lover	Episode: "Rust Proof"
1995	Taking the Falls	—N/a	Episode: "Elvis has Left the Building"
1997	In the Presence of Mine Enemies	Paul Heller	Television movie
1997	Once a Thief	Sam Francisco	Episode: "Rave On"
1998–2000	Twitch City	Curtis	13 episodes; also writer
1999	The Passion of Ayn Rand	Alfred	Television movie
2001	The Industry	John Kalileah	Episode: "Alan's Ex"
2001	Degrassi: The Next Generation	Keith Barra	2 episodes
2001	I Was a Rat	Oliver Tapscrew	3 episodes
2002	Trudeau	Greenbaum	Television movie
2003–2006	Slings & Arrows	Darren Nichols	13 episodes
2003–2007	Odd Job Jack	Jack Ryder (voice)	52 episodes
2005	Rick Mercer Report	Food Court Patron	Episode #2.8
2006	Prairie Giant	Clarence Fines	2 episodes
2006	At the Hotel	Woody	Episode: "I F***ed Lou Reed"
2008	The Englishman's Boy	Coster	2 episodes
2011	Republic of Doyle	J.J. Murphy	Episode: "A Stand Up Guy"
2011–2017	Michael: Every Day	—N/a	Creator, director, and executive producer
2014–2016	Sensitive Skin	Al Jackson	12 episodes; also director and executive producer
2017	Saving Hope	Dr. Amos Carver	3 episodes
2020	Hey Lady!	Dr. Wolfe	5 episodes
2024	The Sympathizer	—N/a	Writer and executive producer
