= Bruce McDonald (director) =

Canadian film director, film producer and film editor

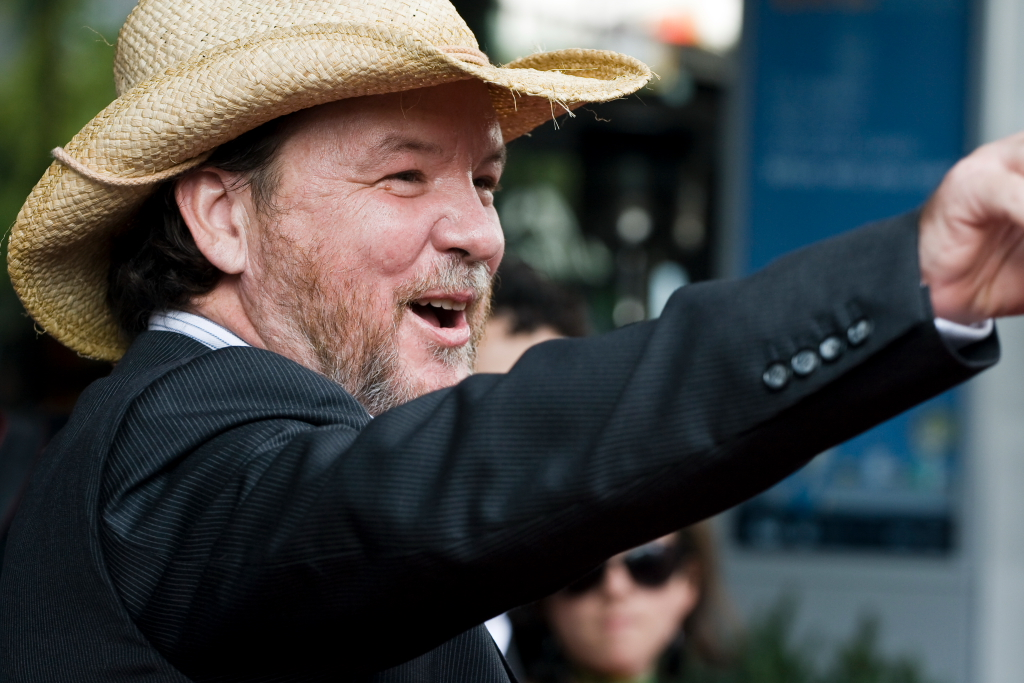
- McDonald at the 2010 Toronto International Film Festival
- Born: May 28, 1959 (age 67); Kingston, Ontario, Canada
- Education: Ryerson University
- Occupations: Film director, writer, producer
- Years active: 1989–present
- Known for: Roadkill (1989); Hard Core Logo (1996); Pontypool (2008)

Bruce McDonald (born May 28, 1959) is a Canadian film and television director, writer, and producer. Born in Kingston, Ontario, he rose to prominence in the 1980s as part of the loosely-affiliated Toronto New Wave.

McDonald has since directed more than a dozen features films over the course of his four-decade-long filmmaking career. The Hollywood Reporter has called him an "iconoclastic filmmaker". Several of his films, ranging from mockumentaries to horror films, have attracted cult followings.

His most notable films include Roadkill (1989), Highway 61 (1991), Hard Core Logo (1996), Pontypool (2008), Trigger (2010), and Hellions (2015). Hard Core Logo has been frequently ranked amongst the greatest movies ever to come out of Canada.

== Early life ==
McDonald was born in Kingston, Ontario, and later moved to Toronto, where he graduated from film school at Ryerson University. At Ryerson, he made the short films Merge (1980) and Let Me See... (1982), the latter of which won the Norman Jewison Award for best student film at the 1982 Canadian National Exhibition and screened at the Toronto International Film Festival. Jewison has mentored McDonald throughout his career.

== Career ==
=== 1980s–1990s ===
McDonald began his filmmaking career in the 1980s. He started out production assistant and driver, and was an assistant cameraman and editor on films by Atom Egoyan, Ron Mann, Peter Mettler, and Amnon Buchbinder. He also directed the 1985 short film Knock! Knock!, and episodes of The Ray Bradbury Theatre.

His feature-length directorial debut, Roadkill, won the award for Best Canadian Film at the Toronto International Film Festival and McDonald earned some notoriety and media attention when he quipped, while accepting his $25,000 prize from TIFF for Roadkill, that he planned to spend the money on "a big chunk of hash".

Roadkill was the first of a trilogy of road movies—including Highway 61 (1991) and Hard Core Logo (1996)—the film launched his reputation as a maverick independent. Roadkill was a success with audiences and critics. Highway 61 (1991) was named Best Canadian Feature at the Vancouver International Film Festival and won awards at festivals in Brussels and San Sebastiàn. In 1996, Hard Core Logo won the award for Best Canadian Feature at Sudbury's Cinefest and at the Vancouver International Film Festival, marking his second win at the latter.

Hard Core Logo has been frequently ranked amongst the greatest movies ever to come out of Canada, and is considered to be McDonald's breakthrough film. The film won the Genie Award for Best Achievement in Music — Original Song for the track "Who the Hell Do You Think You Are?" and was nominated for five other awards including Best Film and Best Direction. It won the Best Canadian Feature at the Sudbury Cinéfest and, at the Vancouver International Film Festival, it received the $10,000 CITY-TV award for Best Canadian Film, with Baker winning the Rogers prize for Best Canadian Screenplay.

=== 2000s–2010s ===
Since the late 1990s, McDonald has directed dozens of film and television productions. His 2006 film, The Tracey Fragments, premiered at the 57th Berlin International Film Festival, where it was awarded the Manfred Salzgeber Prize for innovative filmmaking. The Tracey Fragments was chosen as one of the top 10 best Canadian films of 2007 by Toronto International Film Festival. He then directed the horror film Pontypool, which was also selected as one of the top 10 best Canadian films of the year, this time 2008, by the Toronto International Film Festival.

In 2009, McDonald directed three short films for the cross-platform project City Sonic, McDonald, along with six other directors, shot 20 short films about Toronto musicians and the places where their musical lives were transformed. McDonald directed films starring Die Mannequin, the Cancer Bats, and Geddy Lee of Rush.

His 2010 film Trigger was the first film ever screened at Toronto's new TIFF Bell Lightbox. The film was originally planned in the late 1990s as a companion film to McDonald's Hard Core Logo, which would have starred Hugh Dillon and Callum Keith Rennie. However, work on the film remained dormant until McDonald and screenwriter Daniel MacIvor decided to rewrite their original screenplay to be about two women instead; these roles were ultimately played by Tracy Wright and Molly Parker. Wright, who McDonald had frequently worked with throughout his career, was undergoing treatment for pancreatic cancer during the film's production. It was the last film she completed before her death.

This Movie Is Broken, a concert film on Broken Social Scene was released on June 25, 2010.

Hard Core Logo 2 premiered at the Whistler Film Festival on December 4, 2010, with the members of Die Mannequin and McDonald walking the red carpet. Expectations were set high for Bruce McDonald when he released the second instalment of Hard Core Logo. This caused the film to receive mixed reviews; Postmedia News wrote that it is a film about "artistic inspiration, maintaining a pure creative heart and connecting with others through honest expression" while The Globe and Mail referred to the feature as giving the audience "no sense of urgency, desire, or necessity" to continue watching.

In 2011, he produced the documentary television series Yonge Street: Toronto Rock & Roll Stories, focusing on the history of the Yonge Street music scene in Toronto in the 1960s, for Bravo.

In 2014, he directed the horror thriller Hellions (2015) starring Chloe Rose, which premiered at the 2015 Sundance Film Festival and later screened at the 2015 Toronto International Film Festival. His subsequent film Weirdos, was released in 2016.

=== 2020s ===
McDonald's most recent feature film is Dreamland, which was released on June 5, 2020.

== Reception ==
Early in his career, he was referred to as a "bad boy" of Canadian cinema. Several of his films, ranging from mockumentaries to horror films, have attracted cult followings.

Variety described his films as containing a "mash up humor with adventure, music, or horror". The Hollywood Reporter has called him an "iconoclastic filmmaker".

== Personal life ==
McDonald currently resides in Toronto with his wife, Dany Chiasson, who works as a cinematographer and filmmaker, and their daughter.

== Filmography ==
=== Film ===
- Roadkill (1989)
- Highway 61 (1991)
- Dance Me Outside (1994)
- Hard Core Logo (1996)
- Elimination Dance (1998)
- Picture Claire (2001)
- The Love Crimes of Gillian Guess (2004)
- The Tracey Fragments (2007)
- Killer Wave (2007)
- Pontypool (2008)
- This Movie Is Broken (2010)
- Trigger (2010)
- My Babysitter's a Vampire (2010)
- Hard Core Logo 2 (2010)
- The Husband (2013)
- Hellions (2015)
- Weirdos (2016)
- Dreamland (2019)

=== TV ===
- American Whiskey Bar (1998)
- Darcy's Wild Life (2006; 1 episode: "Trash Talk")
- Heartland (2014–2018; 8 episodes)
- Dark Matter (2015–2017; 5 episodes)
- Creeped Out (2017–2019; 8 episodes)
- Ransom (2019; 2 episodes)
- Malory Towers (2020–2024; 31 episodes); also producer
- From (2024; 2 episodes)
