= All for One (The Sympathizer) =

- The Sympathizer episode
- Episode no.: Episode 5
- Directed by: Marc Munden
- Written by: Park Chan-wook; Don McKellar; Maegan Houang
- Cinematography by: Ji-Yong Kim
- Editing by: Vikash Patel
- Original release date: May 12, 2024
- Running time: 58 minutes

Guest appearances
- Siena Werber as Violet; Marine Delterme as Monique Thibault; Bob Clendenin as Studio Lawyer

Episode chronology
| ← Previous "Give Us Some Good Lines" | Next → "The Oriental Mode of Destruction" |

"All for One" is the fifth episode of the American historical black comedy drama miniseries The Sympathizer, based on the novel of the same name by Viet Thanh Nguyen. The episode was written by series creators Park Chan-wook and Don McKellar and co-producer Maegan Houang, and directed by Marc Munden. It originally aired on HBO on May 12, 2024, and was also available on Max on the same day.

The series is based on the story of the Captain, a North Vietnam plant in the South Vietnam army. He is forced to flee to the United States with his general near the end of the Vietnam War. While living within a community of South Vietnamese refugees, he continues to secretly spy on the community and report back to the Viet Cong, struggling between his original loyalties and his new life. In the episode, the Captain recovers from his injuries and the lines between reality and fiction begin to blur.

According to Nielsen Media Research, the episode was seen by an estimated 0.058 million household viewers and gained a 0.01 ratings share among adults aged 18–49. The episode received very positive reviews from critics, who praised the writing, performances and ending.

== Plot ==
The Captain is seriously injured by Nicos' (Robert Downey Jr.) pyrotechnics, which the director may have intentionally detonated with the Captain on the set. The Captain (Hoa Xuande) is taken to a hospital, where he reminisces over his childhood with Bon (Fred Nguyen Khan) and Mẫn (Duy Nguyễn). Although other children bullied the Captain for being mixed race, Bon and Mẫn befriended him, and the three swore a blood oath to each other and modeled themselves after the Three Musketeers. The Captain is visited by studio representatives to offer a compensation for the injuries, but the Captain demands an apology from Nicos and a much larger compensation.

Claude (Downey Jr.) gets the Captain released and asks him to check in on the General (Toan Le), claiming that the General has been behaving erratically. The Captain gives his compensation money to Oanh's family, feeling guilty for his role in Oanh's murder. However, Oanh's wife surprisingly decides to donate the money to the General, whom she claims is hatching a military plot to take back Vietnam. The General confirms to the Captain that he is planning an invasion, which he is funding through Madame's (Ky Duyen) popular Phở restaurant. The Captain visits Sofia (Sandra Oh), who is now revealed to be in a relationship with journalist Sonny Tran (Alan Trong), the Captain's rival from college. Per a suggestion by Claude, the Captain visits an Asian performance show, where Lana (Vy Le) works as a cabaret singer. Lana and soul singer Jamie Johnson (Max Whittington-Cooper) perform a romantic duet on stage, though Lana also flirts with the Captain in her dressing room.

Concerned about the General's plot, the Captain writes a coded message about the plot to Man and sends him photographs of the General's plans. The Captain also anonymously sends photos of the General's plans to Sonny. Later, while being driven by the Captain, the General questions how Sonny knows so much about his plot and criticizes Sonny's left-wing views, suggesting that Sonny may be a Communist spy. The General leads the Captain to a secret base where he has been training troops to take part in his invasion. To the Captain's dismay, he finds Bon is leading the soldiers.

== Production ==
=== Development ===
The episode was written by series creators Park Chan-wook and Don McKellar and co-producer Maegan Houang, and directed by Marc Munden. It was Park's fifth writing credit, McKellar's fifth writing credit, Houang's first writing credit, and Munden's first directing credit. Munden's involvement was reported in January 2023.

For the FantASIA sequences with Lana, Vy Le did her own singing with coaching by a choreographer and a lyricist from Paris By Night, brought on by co-star Ky Duyen who is also a longtime co-host of the variety program.

== Reception ==
=== Viewers ===
The episode was watched by 0.058 million viewers, earning a 0.01 in the 18-49 rating demographics on the Nielson ratings scale. This means that 0.01 percent of all households with televisions watched the episode. This was a 44% decrease in viewership from the previous episode, which was watched by 0.070 million viewers with a 0.01 in the 18-49 demographic.

=== Critical reviews ===
"All for One" received positive reviews from critics. Tom Philip of The A.V. Club gave the episode an "A–" grade and wrote, "While The Sympathizer demonstrably gets off on repeatedly displacing us in time, the story itself remains deceptively uncluttered. It's being inside the Captain's mind that wrong-foots us occasionally, and “All For One” stakes its claim as the best episode of the season so far in merging both story and perception."

Terry Nguyen of Vulture gave the episode a 3 star rating out of 5 and wrote, "The Captain did not realize the extent of the General's preparation until he arrived at the training grounds and spotted Bon leading the troops. His expression of dumbfounded disbelief is laced with betrayal — the first, as we can surmise, of two betrayals by his blood brothers. But is it true betrayal if the Captain, too, was deceiving Bon the entire time?"

Fletcher Peters of The Daily Beast wrote, "The General has trained an entire army here in California, ready to strike Vietnam at a moment's notice. Isn't the war over? Hasn't he learned? Poor Captain has more spying to do — it seems like this may never end." Josh Rosenberg of Esquire wrote, "From what we've seen of The Sympathizer's timeline so far, the Captain does end up back in Vietnam somehow. Now that I look back, it's possible that the series had to get a bit wacky just so the immediate seriousness hit like a light switch. There are just two episodes left — and the Captain is already at his breaking point."
