= Endings Are Hard, Aren't They? =

- The Sympathizer episode
- Episode no.: Episode 7
- Directed by: Marc Munden
- Written by: Park Chan-wook; Don McKellar
- Cinematography by: Ji-Yong Kim
- Editing by: Jin Lee
- Original release date: May 26, 2024
- Running time: 60 minutes

Guest appearances
- David Duchovny as Ryan Glenn; John Cho as James Yoon

Episode chronology
← Previous "The Oriental Mode of Destruction"	Next → —

"Endings Are Hard, Aren't They?" is the seventh and final episode of the American historical black comedy drama miniseries The Sympathizer, based on the novel of the same name by Viet Thanh Nguyen. The episode was written by series creators Park Chan-wook and Don McKellar, and directed by Marc Munden. It originally aired on HBO on May 26, 2024, and was also available on Max on the same day.

The series is based on the story of the Captain, a North Vietnamese double agent in the South Vietnamese army. He is forced to flee to the United States with his general near the end of the Vietnam War. While living within a community of South Vietnamese emigres, he continues spy on the community and report to the Viet Cong, struggling between his original loyalties and his new life. In the episode, the Captain and Bon are sent to Vietnam, where they are captured and the Captain must write a confession to his officers. The episode received very positive reviews from critics, who deemed it a fitting end to the series.

== Plot ==
The Captain (Hoa Xuande) and Bon (Fred Nguyen Khan) arrive in Bangkok, where Claude (Robert Downey Jr.) gives their troop time to party at a local bar before their mission. Privately, Claude shows the Captain that he possesses a tape where he confesses his real allegiance to Sonny (Alan Trong). Claude pressures him to take a spiked drink, which will make him ill and cause him to be relieved from his duties so they can discuss all his actions. The Captain refuses and he is sent to Vietnam the following day.

As their troop is ambushed and shot down, Bon prepares to fight, but is convinced by the Captain to surrender. They are captured and taken to a North Vietnamese re-education camp, where Bon tries to get himself killed by opposing the camp's Communist alliance. This is where the Captain writes his confession, trying to get the Commandant to accept his "ending" compared to his suggestions. Rather than writing what his communist comrades wish to see, the Captain writes a complex and nuanced reflection of the events that have led him to his imprisonment.

After standing up to the camp commandant, a man who covered his scarred head after suffering in the Fall of Saigon. He is impressed with his confession, but he wants to go deeper into the Captain's memories. He subjects him to days of torture, during which he hallucinates the presence of Sonny and Oahn (Phanxinê). He imagines being released and talking with Man (Duy Nguyễn), before finally opening up to the commissar over his guilt over letting a female spy be tortured rather than revealing his cover. The hallucination also reveals that he met his father (Downey as a priest) when he was a child. The commissar then surprises the Captain by revealing that the female spy is in the camp, and has also written a confession. Despite his actions, she has not exposed his cover.

During another encounter, the commissar removes his mask, revealing himself to be Man. As his final test, Man makes the Captain think of something more important than their country's freedom and independence. The Captain concludes that it is "nothing", and he is finally allowed to go. The Captain uses Man's mask to release Bon from confinement and gives him an officer's uniform. As Man watches, the Captain and Bon leave the camp in a vehicle. Driving off, the Captain wants to open up about more secrets he has kept from Bon but the latter is not interested, content that he is free. Later that night, the Captain and Bon sneak onto a boat with other refugees to escape Vietnam as boat people. The Captain, joined by Sonny and Oahn, looks on to the beach, finally leaving the country.

== Production ==
=== Development ===
The episode was written by series creators Park Chan-wook and Don McKellar, and directed by Marc Munden. It was Park's seventh writing credit, McKellar's seventh writing credit, and Munden's third directing credit. Munden's involvement was reported in January 2023.

=== Writing ===
"But what was this meaning? What had I intuited at last? Namely this: While nothing is more precious than independence and freedom, nothing is also more precious than independence and freedom. These two slogans are almost the same, but not quite. I understood, at last, how our revolution had gone from being the vanguard of political change to the rearguard hoarding power."

— Paragraph from the novel detailing the meaning of the phrase.

The episode adapted the phrase "nothing is also more precious than independence and freedom", which is used in the novel. Hoa Xuande offered his own interpretation of the phrase, "it's the despair. It's the fact that all of this effort to achieve this ideal has caused so much destruction, actually ripped people apart, endangered so many people that, was that cause even worth it? The idea that “nothing” is actually above freedom and independence. We have to try and understand that we are no better than the ideals that we purport all the time.

Don McKellar said that the series wanted to show a different depiction of Man, "We see manifestations of what we believe Man to be now, after the war, until we discover at the end the reality of his situation and its horrifying, it's disturbing and in the series I think it’s captured well from the book.” Regarding Man's new personality, Duy Nguyễn said "I had to create a whole different character to reach that point at the end, when he's broken and burned up. But he still tries to be the person that his friends remember, even though they don't recognize him. That's the most heartbreaking part."

== Reception ==
=== Critical reviews ===
"Endings Are Hard, Aren't They?" received very positive reviews from critics. Tom Philip of The A.V. Club gave the episode a "B+" grade and wrote, "The episodic structure of TV storytelling made a great template for adapting the fractured, unreliable voice of the Captain from the novel. Creators Park Chan-wook and Don McKellar, both known for their singular styles and legends in their own right, made for good collaborators. The Sympathizer didn't come close to making all its shots, but the ambition, style, and weirdness of the endeavor has been fun to explore."

Terry Nguyen of Vulture gave the episode a 3 star rating out of 5 and wrote, "I wished for a scene that reflected this catharsis, for the Captain to finally savor his freedom from those who've exploited his loyalties. Instead, the Captain's story ends on a note of hopeful uncertainty. Surrounded by ghosts, he sails towards the promise of redemption on the horizon, towards a self-determined life." Ben Travers of IndieWire gave the episode an "A–" grade and wrote, "Instinctively, these final moments may feel frustrating, like this epic odyssey is going out with a whimper instead of a bang. There's no glory in these deaths. There's no Hollywood ending, touting their bravery or patriotism. But that very feeling also serves The Sympathizer's antiwar message. Their contradictions are unresolved, their ends beyond unsatisfying. And that's the point. Because that's the truth."

Fletcher Peters of The Daily Beast wrote, "Was Captain's mission successful? Who knows. What matters is that he was able to sympathize with both sides, playing them both to get out alive and save the one person who mattered most to him in the world — even if Bon wasn't on the same side." Josh Rosenberg of Esquire wrote, "'Endings are hard, aren't they?' You've got that right, The Sympathizer. The finale, airing on HBO Sunday night, knows how hard it is to stick the landing — and it’s pretty damn meta about it. “Why do I have this ominous feeling that the reviews are not going to be good?” the Captain asks. Sir, what are you talking about?!? You'll only see a thumbs-up from me — because The Sympathizer stuck the landing."
