= The Oriental Mode of Destruction =

- The Sympathizer episode
- Episode no.: Episode 6
- Directed by: Marc Munden
- Written by: Park Chan-wook; Don McKellar; Anchuli Felicia King
- Cinematography by: Ji-Yong Kim
- Editing by: Jin Lee
- Original release date: May 19, 2024
- Running time: 52 minutes

Episode chronology
← Previous "All for One"	Next → "Endings Are Hard, Aren't They?"

"The Oriental Mode of Destruction" is the sixth episode of the American historical black comedy drama miniseries The Sympathizer, based on the novel of the same name by Viet Thanh Nguyen. The episode was written by series creators Park Chan-wook and Don McKellar and Anchuli Felicia King, and directed by Marc Munden. It originally aired on HBO on May 19, 2024, and was also available on Max on the same day.

The series is based on the story of the Captain, a North Vietnam plant in the South Vietnam army. He is forced to flee to the United States with his general near the end of the Vietnam War. While living within a community of South Vietnamese refugees, he continues to secretly spy on the community and report back to the Viet Cong, struggling between his original loyalties and his new life. In the episode, the Captain faces a possible exposure of his cover and decides to take action, just as Bon decides to leave for a dangerous mission.

According to Nielsen Media Research, the episode was seen by an estimated 0.062 million household viewers and gained a 0.00 ratings share among adults aged 18–49. The episode received very positive reviews from critics, who praised the performances, tension and themes.

== Plot ==
At the base, the Captain (Hoa Xuande) is told by many of the soldiers that the General (Toan Le) plans to send them to Thailand for a special mission, wherein they will move into Vietnam. Bon (Fred Nguyen Khan) plans to volunteer, despite the Captain's warning that the mission is near impossible to win. He later visits an office to talk with jingoistic Congressman Ned Godwin (Robert Downey Jr.), offering his services.

Through his work with Godwin, the Captain realizes that Godwin and other powerful Americans, including the CIA, are secretly funding the General's military plot to retake Vietnam. He also learns that Professor Hammer (Downey Jr.) is now Godwin's speechwriter, and Hammer admits to writing the racist and anti-communist book The Oriental Mode of Destruction. The Captain gets in touch with Sonny (Alan Trong), offering to share proof of the plot's funding so Sonny can expose it to the public.

When the Captain expresses worry about Bon's involvement in what is bound to be a suicide mission, the General takes him to a hot spring in the outskirts to explain his decision, claiming Bon has nothing to lose. The Captain asks Mẫn (Duy Nguyễn) to ensure Bon's safety but receives no assistance from his handler.

The Captain shows Godwin's documents to Sonny and opens up about his real identity, admitting that he is a double agent for the Communists and responsible for Oanh's death. Despite the Captain's honesty, Sonny does not believe him. The Captain subsequently kills Sonny and steals his manuscript about the General's mission.

At his apartment, the Captain begins to burn Sonny's manuscript, despite telling the Communists that the article was sent in for publication. Later, the Captain visits Sofia just as she is questioned by the police over Sonny's death. After the officers leave, Sofia makes it clear that she suspects the Captain was responsible for Sonny's death. She notes the Captain's closeness to the General and that Sonny told her that he was supposed to meet the Captain around the time of his death. She gives the Captain a fake alibi but asks him to never return. The Captain then visits the General, asking to be part of the mission. The episode ends as the Captain and Bon leave the United States on an airplane, with the Captain now hallucinating the presence of Oanh and Sonny.

== Production ==
=== Development ===
The episode was written by series creators Park Chan-wook and Don McKellar and Anchuli Felicia King, and directed by Marc Munden. It was Park's sixth writing credit, McKellar's sixth writing credit, King's first writing credit, and Munden's second directing credit. Munden's involvement was reported in January 2023.

=== Writing ===
On Sofia's decision to send the Captain away, Sandra Oh explained, "In this episode, you really see how the Captain is actually a very reactionary person and that's what Sofia picks up on. She asks him a question, she's basically saying, ‘You're not impulsive?’ and she can read by the way that he answers that he is guilty, that he has done something terrible. But her loyalty, in her blossoming and having a deeper understanding of herself as an Asian American woman, she chooses to align herself with the person that she was in love with, but is so disgusted by what he has probably done that she rejects him. So I actually really, really love Episode 6 looking at it, because it's very, very complex."

== Reception ==
=== Viewers ===
The episode was watched by 0.062 million viewers, earning a 0.00 in the 18-49 rating demographics on the Nielson ratings scale. This means that 0.00 percent of all households with televisions watched the episode. This was a 44% decrease in viewership from the previous episode, which was watched by 0.058 million viewers with a 0.01 in the 18-49 demographic.

=== Critical reviews ===
"The Oriental Mode of Destruction" received very positive reviews from critics. Tom Philip of The A.V. Club gave the episode a "B+" grade and wrote, "Well, that was fast. Even for a show so eager to reconfigure and relocate itself episode by episode, it still feels like next week's finale, and the Captain's return to Vietnam, has suddenly snuck up on us a little, with so many dangling curiosities we for sure won’t get all the answers for. Will we ever see Lana, Sofia, or non-Claude RDJs again? It seems unlikely, some more so than others."

Terry Nguyen of Vulture gave the episode a 4 star rating out of 5 and wrote, "The penultimate episode opens with a series of quick cuts. Hardly any of the shots linger for longer than a few seconds. The Captain is descending the hill behind the General to greet the insurgent refugee army. Directed by Marc Munden, the sixth episode returns to the espionage-style plot at full steam, regaining some of the momentum and style of the first three installments."

Fletcher Peters of The Daily Beast wrote, "The General approves Captain's request to join the militia. He and Bon prepare by promising themselves that they'll get to see Man again someday soon. Then, they board a flight, shaking and fearful of what's to greet them in their home country." Josh Rosenberg of Esquire wrote, "The job is physically taxing, sure — you have to kill someone every now and then. But espionage is mostly a mental game. It's not only about keeping a secret but also about constantly upholding a facade. Exhausting, right? In this penultimate episode of The Sympathizer, the Captain is feeling the strain of his particular line of work. He reaches his breaking point — but it's just one of many to come."
