= Give Us Some Good Lines =

- The Sympathizer episode
- Episode no.: Episode 4
- Directed by: Fernando Meirelles
- Written by: Park Chan-wook; Don McKellar
- Cinematography by: Barry Ackroyd
- Editing by: Fernando Stutz
- Original release date: May 5, 2024
- Running time: 59 minutes

Guest appearances
- David Duchovny as Thespian/Ryan Glenn; John Cho as James Yoon; Maxwell Whittington-Cooper as Idol/Jamie Johnson; Siena Werber as Violet; Marine Delterme as Monique Thibault

Episode chronology
| ← Previous "Love It or Leave It" | Next → "All for One" |

"Give Us Some Good Lines" is the fourth episode of the American historical black comedy drama miniseries The Sympathizer, based on the novel of the same name by Viet Thanh Nguyen. The episode was written by series creators Park Chan-wook and Don McKellar, and directed by Fernando Meirelles. It originally aired on HBO on May 5, 2024, and was also available on Max on the same day.

The series is based on the story of the Captain, a North Vietnam plant in the South Vietnam army. He is forced to flee to the United States with his general near the end of the Vietnam War. While living within a community of South Vietnamese refugees, he continues to secretly spy on the community and report back to the Viet Cong, struggling between his original loyalties and his new life. In the episode, the Captain joins Nicos in consulting authenticity for his new film, which soon spirals into a chaotic production.

According to Nielsen Media Research, the episode was seen by an estimated 0.070 million household viewers and gained a 0.01 ratings share among adults aged 18–49. The episode received positive reviews from critics, who praised the performances and tone, although some criticized its pacing and deviation from the main storyline.

== Plot ==
The Captain (Hoa Xuande) meets with Nicos Damianos (Robert Downey Jr.) to discuss his script for The Hamlet. The Captain wants the Vietnamese characters to have more lines, but Nicos is not convinced by his suggestions. After consulting with Mẫn (Duy Nguyễn), Sofia (Sandra Oh) and the General (Toan Le), the Captain sets to leave for four months to join Nicos on filming in Napa County, California. While driving, he discovers that Lana (Vy Le) has sneaked into his trunk, and he reluctantly allows her to accompany him.

On the set, they are introduced to eccentric method actor Ryan Glenn (David Duchovny), soul singer Jamie Johnson (Maxwell Whittington-Cooper), and actor James Yoon (John Cho). James is one of the few Asian actors in Hollywood and is most notable for his on-screen deaths at the hands of white movie stars. The Captain meets production designer Monique Thibault (Marine Delterme) and is smitten when he sees her work in recreating the set's Vietnamese villages. The Captain asks Monique to add the name of his mother, to a headstone in the fake village's cemetery, revealing that his mother could not afford a headstone and was buried in an unmarked grave. When Monique fulfils his request, the Captain begins bringing incense and offerings to the prop headstone in honor of his mother.

The production hits a tough spot when an old Chinese actress is unable to speak Vietnamese. The Captain calls the General to help him recruit Vietnamese extras, one of whom ends up being Bon (Fred Nguyen Khan). The formerly depressed Bon takes great pleasure in reenacting the brutal deaths of the characters he portrays. Nicos also allows Lana to be in the film as an extra. She aims to gain a more prominent role in the film and begins a flirtatious relationship with Jamie. During a preview of James's death scene, the Captain has flashbacks to the torture he witnessed in Vietnam, and Glenn interrupts to accuse Jamie of not taking his role seriously.

Glenn suddenly disappears from set with a gun, forcing the crew to halt production. He eventually announces his return by leaving a deer's severed head in Nicos's bed. Nicos decides to add two new scenes: one where Glenn's character rapes Lana's character, who is now named after the Captain's mother, and (unbeknownst to the Captain) a finale where the village set is destroyed by several air strikes. When the Captain objects to the rape scene, Nicos fires him. During the filming of the rape scene, the Captain intentionally cues Jamie early, fearing that the volatile Glenn will actually hurt Lana. Jamie breaks in and brutally fights Glenn, destroying the set and ruining the take. Despite Glenn's satisfaction with the scene's new authenticity, Nicos is infuriated, and Lana blames the Captain for ruining her chance at stardom. While the Captain is visiting the fake gravestone of his mother, Nicos detonates the planned explosives, and the Captain is injured in the crossfire.

== Production ==
=== Development ===
The episode was written by series creators Park Chan-wook and Don McKellar, and directed by Fernando Meirelles. It was Park's fourth writing credit, McKellar's fourth writing credit, and Meirelles' first directing credit.

=== Writing ===
The producers decided to mark the halfway point of the series to revolve around the making of The Hamlet, playing as "a kind of standalone episode." Fernando Meirelles described the episode, "It makes fun of how Americans see themselves as the center of the world, and how sometimes arrogant they are. Me being a foreigner, I see that. That's nothing really new. It was only making fun of something that I always see." Comparisons were made between the series to director Francis Ford Coppola during the making of Apocalypse Now, with Meirelles joking "The difference between me shooting this episode and Coppola shooting Apocalypse Now is that I had only 13 days to shoot."

In the novel, The Hamlet was filmed in the Philippines, while the series changed it to California. Park explained that budget restraints forced them to change the location, but also was content with the decision, "in hindsight, it turned out better in terms of our creative aspect... we were able to bring in our secondary characters into our story to have them play the background actors in this Hamlet story. So there were some things that we had to forfeit, but at the same time, I think there was much more to gain from changing this part of the story."

=== Casting ===
On his appearance, John Cho commented, "I was thinking about the generation or two before me, and that seemed to be a better match in terms of the social mood of the time and how that person would have been treated off and on the set. In my mind, it was more of an ode to the people that preceded me, that were my mentors. A lot of the Asian American actors that I was first introduced to were primarily theater actors who didn’t pay all the bills through film and television. Those were the people I was thinking about. Nevertheless, he also said that he understands if people find meta elements to his career, "I can see it, especially if you're young, and maybe Harold & Kumar Go to White Castle is maybe the first time you were kind of aware of an Asian American presence onscreen. So I certainly see that someone could think that." Viet Thanh Nguyen also saw meta elements by casting Cho, "For a good part of our generation, John was that Korean-American star that we saw in every television show that necessitated an Asian male character."

== Reception ==
=== Viewers ===
The episode was watched by 0.070 million viewers, earning a 0.01 in the 18-49 rating demographics on the Nielson ratings scale. This means that 0.01 percent of all households with televisions watched the episode. This was a 44% decrease in viewership from the previous episode, which was watched by 0.081 million viewers with a 0.01 in the 18-49 demographic.

=== Critical reviews ===
"Give Us Some Good Lines" received positive reviews from critics. Tom Philip of The A.V. Club gave the episode a "B+" grade and wrote, "On the flip side, we get a reminder that there's no outrunning your demons as Oanh and his indicting grin appear to the Captain several times accompanied by some terrific, terrifying musical stings. Even with all The Sympathizer's signature flaws, it's a densely-packed episode."

Terry Nguyen of Vulture gave the episode a 2 star rating out of 5 and wrote, "The best meta-commentary on this Hollywood detour was provided by the North Vietnamese commander, whom the Captain is recounting his tale: “Can you not see how you are corrupted by the most crass Hollywood indulgences? The very same indulgences you tried to change?” The same can be said for this very episode, which was regrettably bereft of any good lines."

Fletcher Peters of The Daily Beast wrote, "As Captain leaves the set for good, Niko shoots his final take, blowing up the Vietnamese village created by the production designers. Captain gets caught in the middle of it, bombs exploding around his body as he runs out off set. Now that’s a send-off." Josh Rosenberg of Esquire wrote, "“I was ashamed to admit that I wondered if Ms. Mori would find me sexy,” he tells his North Vietnamese prison guard in the future about his action-star-esque dive out of danger. If we've lost the plot, at least the Captain is as delusional as we are."
