= Love It or Leave It =

- The Sympathizer episode
- Episode no.: Episode 3
- Directed by: Park Chan-wook
- Written by: Park Chan-wook; Don McKellar; Mark Richard
- Cinematography by: Ji-Yong Kim
- Editing by: Jin Lee
- Original release date: April 28, 2024
- Running time: 60 minutes

Episode chronology
← Previous "Good Little Asian"	Next → "Give Us Some Good Lines"

"Love It or Leave It" is the third episode of the American historical black comedy drama miniseries The Sympathizer, based on the novel of the same name by Viet Thanh Nguyen. The episode was written by series creators Park Chan-wook and Don McKellar and co-executive producer Mark Richard, and directed by Park. It originally aired on HBO on April 28, 2024, and was also available on Max on the same day.

The series is based on the story of the Captain, a North Vietnam plant in the South Vietnam army. He is forced to flee to the United States with his general near the end of the Vietnam War. While living within a community of South Vietnamese refugees, he continues to secretly spy on the community and report back to the Viet Cong, struggling between his original loyalties and his new life. In the episode, the Captain and Bon cooperate in order to kill Major Oanh.

According to Nielsen Media Research, the episode was seen by an estimated 0.081 million household viewers and gained a 0.01 ratings share among adults aged 18–49. The episode received generally positive reviews from critics, who praised the performances and technical aspects, although some criticized the writing and pacing.

== Plot ==
The Captain (Hoa Xuande) and Bon (Fred Nguyen Khan) visit the General (Toan Le) to discuss the plot against Major Oanh (Phanxinê), but the General reiterates he must go forward with the assignment. On the drive home, Bon offers to help in robbing Oanh to divert suspicions from the Captain. He then reveals that, unbenknownst to the Captain and Man (Duy Nguyễn), he was part of the Phoenix Program.

The Captain and Bon sneak into Oanh's house, but are caught by his family. Mistaking them as a visit, they converse with his family, and realize that Oanh has grown to love America. At an event hosted by Congressman Ned Godwin (Robert Downey Jr.), the General makes it clear that Oanh needs to be eliminated. During the Fourth of July fireworks, the Captain sneaks into the apartment, under the guise of delivering a durian to Oanh. When he accidentally exposes his gun, he is forced to make Oanh walk towards a corner and prepare to shoot him. Oanh fights back, although the Captain shoots him in the stomach. Bon intervenes and brutally beats Oanh, until the Captain executes him.

The Captain informs Claude (Downey Jr.) of the murder, with Claude revealing that Oanh mentioned him as the mole, but he dismissed it. In a flashback, the Captain is assigned by Claude to interrogate a resistance soldier. Instead, he helps the soldier to die rather than confess. Back to present day, after Oanh's funeral, Claude takes the Captain to a restaurant to talk. They meet with Godwin, Hammer (Downey Jr.) and a filmmaker named Niko Damianos (Downey Jr.). Niko is working on a film named The Hamlet, which covers the Vietnam War, and wants the Captain's involvement for authenticity. The script brings back many memories for the Captain, who also starts hallucinating Oanh's corpse next to him.

== Production ==
=== Development ===
The episode was written by series creators Park Chan-wook and Don McKellar and co-executive producer Mark Richard, and directed by Park. It was Park's third writing credit, McKellar's third writing credit, Richard's first writing credit, and Park's third directing credit.

=== Filming ===
The episode included a scene wherein the four characters portrayed by Robert Downey Jr. shared the screen. The scene required heavy supervision from Park and his crew, with Downey even suggesting having the characters talk over each other's lines. To film his scenes, Downey would play one character, accompanied by two body doubles and the first AD reading the other lines.

For Oanh's death, actor explained, "At that critical moment, I had to speak in Vietnamese, because that's how I can connect with my brother. That's where I fight for my life. It's the only way to make him remember we are not American. We are Vietnamese, which means we are blood brothers. Hoa, who played the Captain, when I started speaking in Vietnamese, he cried. It made me so emotional."

== Reception ==
=== Viewers ===
The episode was watched by 0.081 million viewers, earning a 0.01 in the 18-49 rating demographics on the Nielson ratings scale. This means that 0.01 percent of all households with televisions watched the episode. This was a 44% decrease in viewership from the previous episode, which was watched by 0.147 million viewers with a 0.02 in the 18-49 demographic.

=== Critical reviews ===
"Love It or Leave It" received generally positive reviews from critics. Tom Philip of The A.V. Club gave the episode a "B" grade and wrote, "In lesser hands, The Sympathizer's third episode, “Love It Or Leave It,” would easily be its weakest: The first half hour is almost languid in its pacing, repetitive in what it shows and tells, and Sandra Oh gets fuck all to do. But after a breakneck opening run, a little stop for breath is appreciated and makes the sudden shifts back to its signature propulsive violence and hammy comedy feel a little more unpredictable. A little more dangerous."

Terry Nguyen of Vulture gave the episode a 3 star rating out of 5 and wrote, "The first two episodes of The Sympathizer are what I might call a slow burn: plenty of world-building, character introductions, and expository dialogue. Stylishly shot and compelling but without a clear hook. In the third episode, the last directed by Park Chan Wook, the show finally finds its footing, but not without a few curious stumbles."

Fletcher Peters of The Daily Beast wrote, "This dinner, followed by a vaudeville-esque performance by Claude with a nude woman, really stresses Captain out. The Hamlet script reminds him of his parents. Everything is becoming too much to handle in America. Captain needs to break free of this two-sided life before he collapses under the weight of his identity." Josh Rosenberg of Esquire wrote, "The Downeys go absolutely insane. One of the hostesses rubs Niko's belly as Clause sings at the piano and politician Ned Godwin howls like a dog at a woman covered in whipped cream. I'm having the same thoughts as the Captain as the credits roll. What the hell have we gotten ourselves into now?"
