= Death Wish (The Sympathizer) =

- The Sympathizer episode
- Episode no.: Episode 1
- Directed by: Park Chan-wook
- Written by: Park Chan-wook; Don McKellar
- Cinematography by: Ji-Yong Kim
- Editing by: Vikash Patel
- Original release date: April 14, 2024
- Running time: 57 minutes

Episode chronology
| ← Previous — | Next → "Good Little Asian" |

"Death Wish" is the first episode of the American historical black comedy drama miniseries The Sympathizer, based on the novel of the same name by Viet Thanh Nguyen. The episode was written by series creators Park Chan-wook and Don McKellar, and directed by Park. It originally aired on HBO on April 14, 2024, and was also available on Max on the same day.

The series is based on the story of the Captain, a North Vietnam plant in the South Vietnam army. He is forced to flee to the United States with his general near the end of the Vietnam War. While living within a community of South Vietnamese refugees, he continues to secretly spy on the community and report back to the Viet Cong, struggling between his original loyalties and his new life.

According to Nielsen Media Research, the episode was seen by an estimated 0.206 million household viewers and gained a 0.04 ratings share among adults aged 18–49. The episode received positive reviews from critics, who praised Park's directing, performances, tone, tension and editing.

== Plot ==
At a North Vietnam re-education camp, a man known as the Captain (Hoa Xuande) is pressured by soldiers to "confess" his story.

In 1975, four months before the Fall of Saigon, the Captain meets with a CIA agent named Claude (Robert Downey Jr.), joining him for a "screening" of Death Wish, which is actually an interrogation of a woman being tortured due to possessing a vital list. As they are joined by the General (Toan Le), the woman stares at the Captain in hatred. Two days prior, the Captain is seen working as part of the special police for the South Vietnam army. However, he and his colleague Man (Duy Nguyễn) secretly work with the North Vietnam army. They are friends with Bon (Fred Nguyen Khan), who is not part of their operation, and is content being in the country with his wife and baby.

Two months later, tensions in the country continue arising. Claude visits the Captain and the General, informing them that he is disbanding their partnership and assigns them in destroying all documents linking them. The General is furious and demands two planes to leave the country, which Claude promises, as part of Operation Frequent Wind. However, both the Captain and General are aware that only one plane will be ready. As the Captain and Man discuss their future, Man persuades him to leave on the plane and start a new life in the United States. The Captain agrees, also promising to get Bon and his family out of Vietnam.

With one day to go before the fall of Saigon, the General and the Captain retrieve some selected Vietnamese to join them in the plane. Driving across the dilapidated city, they reach the military base. Claude parts ways with the General and praises the Captain for his actions. As the bus heads towards the plane, bombs start hitting the airfield, eventually causing the bus to crash. The civilians leave the bus and start running towards the plane, with some dying as the bombs continue falling. The Captain leads Bon and his family, but they briefly stay behind and are hit by a helicopter. Bon survives, but his wife and child die. The Captain is unable to persuade Bon in leaving. Back in present day, the Captain laments his situation and his failure in protecting Bon's family.

== Production ==
=== Development ===
The episode was written by series creators Park Chan-wook and Don McKellar, and directed by Park.

=== Writing ===
Part of the narration involves the Captain constantly changing through perspectives, often rewinding scenes. Don McKellar explained that they decided to deviate from the book's tone by saying, "we thought that as a narrative device, as a storytelling device, we like the idea of an old Steenbeck. He's shaping it like a movie. He's editing, he's rewinding. And it just reminds us that it's one version of this story, one subjective version."

=== Filming ===
For the climatic sequence depicting the bombing of Saigon, Don McKellar had reservations over whether they could accomplish it. The sequence required four nights to film. He commented, "we really wanted the audience to feel it. We really wanted to feel it on an emotional level. And director Park [Chan-Wook] is very smart. He's not indulgent of emotions but he's not afraid of them either and he really wanted the emotional impact to be major without being sentimental. So that was a big one. We storyboarded it and worked really hard. We had to make it work."

== Reception ==
=== Viewers ===
The episode was watched by 0.206 million viewers, earning a 0.04 in the 18-49 rating demographics on the Nielson ratings scale. This means that 0.04 percent of all households with televisions watched the episode.

=== Critical reviews ===
"Death Wish" received generally positive reviews from critics. Tom Philip of The A.V. Club gave the episode a "B" grade and wrote, "Park's ability as a director is beyond reproach, and it's great to see '70s-era stylistic choices making its way into how the story itself is told and not just the setting."

Terry Nguyen of Vulture gave the episode a 4 star rating out of 5 and wrote, "There's a quote often attributed to the French director François Truffaut about how “there's no such thing as an anti-war film.” Perhaps what Truffaut meant, other interpretations notwithstanding, is that most narratives about war inevitably take a side; that cinema imbues combat and conflict with a moral imperative and transforms violence into spectacle. But if an anti-war film is impossible, is there hope for cinema that grapples with war's abject dualities without striking a false balance? The Sympathizer may be well-positioned to do so under the creative direction of its non-American showrunners: Park Chan-wook, [...] and Don McKellar."

Fletcher Peters of The Daily Beast wrote, "Before the torture at the cinema, the South Vietnamese police drag this woman to another CIA safehouse where they continue to beat her and force her to sit in her own poop. This all happens just 10 minutes in — and I'm assuming this show is only going to get even more graphic." Josh Rosenberg of Esquire wrote, "Bon's wife and child are killed in the assault, greatly increasing the likelihood that his friend would attempt to kill him if he ever found out he was a spy. For the Captain's sake, I hope that event never comes to pass. But as a member of an audience watching a television show for the tension and drama, I really hope it does."
