= Good Little Asian =

- The Sympathizer episode
- Episode no.: Episode 2
- Directed by: Park Chan-wook
- Written by: Park Chan-wook; Don McKellar; Naomi Iizuka
- Cinematography by: Ji-Yong Kim
- Editing by: Vikash Patel
- Original release date: April 21, 2024
- Running time: 60 minutes

Episode chronology
| ← Previous "Death Wish" | Next → "Love It or Leave It" |

"Good Little Asian" is the second episode of the American historical black comedy drama miniseries The Sympathizer, based on the novel of the same name by Viet Thanh Nguyen. The episode was written by series creators Park Chan-wook and Don McKellar and Naomi Iizuka, and directed by Park. It originally aired on HBO on April 21, 2024, and was also available on Max on the same day.

The series is based on the story of the Captain, a North Vietnam plant in the South Vietnam army. He is forced to flee to the United States with his general near the end of the Vietnam War. While living within a community of South Vietnamese refugees, he continues to secretly spy on the community and report back to the Viet Cong, struggling between his original loyalties and his new life. In the episode, the Captain and Bon start their life in America, while the Captain continues spying and sending messages to Man.

According to Nielsen Media Research, the episode was seen by an estimated 0.147 million household viewers and gained a 0.02 ratings share among adults aged 18–49. The episode received positive reviews from critics, who praised Park's directing, performances and writing.

== Plot ==
At the North Vietnam re-education camp, the Captain (Hoa Xuande) is brought before a superior officer to continue his confession.

At the airfield, the Captain and Bon (Fred Nguyen Khan) run towards the plane, carrying the bodies of Bon's wife and baby. Despite the weight, they manage to get on the plane and leave Saigon. After fleeing Vietnam, the Captain, Bon and the refugees stay at Fort Chaffee, Arkansas, with the Captain sending letters to Man (Duy Nguyễn), who now lives in Hanoi. Amidst poor conditions, the General (Toan Le) fails to calm the refugees and is humiliated by a group of refugee women, who blame his leadership for the deaths of their family members. The Captain and Bon are allowed to leave the camp for Los Angeles when they receive sponsorship from Professor Hammer (Robert Downey Jr.), an Orientalist professor who mentored the Captain during his college days in the US. The Captain is taken aback by Hammer's behavior but becomes infatuated with his secretary, Sofia Mori (Sandra Oh), soon developing a sexual relationship with her.

Sometime later, the General finally moves to Los Angeles with his wife and daughter, settling at a poorly dilapidated house. To build trust with the South Vietnamese community, he decides to open a liquor store. The General shares his concerns with the Captain that there might be a mole in his squad, alarming the Captain. The Captain meets up with the General and Claude (Downey Jr.), and both laugh over a rumor that the Captain might be the mole. When questioned over why he did not get the General out earlier, Claude tells the Captain that he wanted him to take a liking to America and be grateful for his new life opportunity. The Captain also struggles in living with Bon, who has become depressed and a heavy drinker. The Captain decides to frame Major Oanh as the mole, and Bon offers to help him kill Oanh.

== Production ==
=== Development ===
The episode was written by series creators Park Chan-wook and Don McKellar and Naomi Iizuka, and directed by Park. It was Park's second writing credit, McKellar's second writing credit, Iizuka's first writing credit, and Park's second directing credit.

=== Writing ===
Hoa Xuande said that the episode wanted to explore the ignorance of America during the Vietnam War, particularly over "sides within that conflict." He said that the interview scene "is very telling of how the narrative of the Vietnam War has been very one-sided, very Western-centric for such a long time."

=== Filming ===
Despite not having enough time to prepare, Sandra Oh and Hoa Xuande didn't struggle in building chemistry for their characters' sexual relationship. Oh explained, "For me as an actor, chemistry is about being able to listen. You're able to listen, you're able to follow and you know how to play tennis. You know how to dance. Hoa is in, I think, every single scene of the show so he didn't have any time to kind of hang out. So it was just about being an open and willing fellow actor to really listen and be willing to dance."

== Reception ==
=== Viewers ===
The episode was watched by 0.147 million viewers, earning a 0.02 in the 18-49 rating demographics on the Nielson ratings scale. This means that 0.02 percent of all households with televisions watched the episode. This was a 28% decrease in viewership from the previous episode, which was watched by 0.206 million viewers with a 0.04 in the 18-49 demographic.

=== Critical reviews ===
"Good Little Asian" received positive reviews from critics. Tom Philip of The A.V. Club gave the episode a "B" grade and wrote, "The first episode of The Sympathizer felt, in many ways like a prologue. That's doubled down in episode two, where the plot starts growing tendrils that won't bloom for another few weeks and our major players are brought more firmly into focus. I said the series premiere had an air of “previously on” about it, and while the pacing of the scenes in episode two remains rapid, “Good Little Asian” lays down the groundwork for the next few hours of storytelling."

Terry Nguyen of Vulture gave the episode a 4 star rating out of 5 and wrote, "The second episode swiftly departs from the mood of heightened melodrama that colored the last climactic scene. It is better paced and more tonally consistent than the premiere, with just the right amount of explanatory voiceover."

Fletcher Peters of The Daily Beast wrote, "The Sympathizer has touched down in America. Following the end of last week's premiere episode, Captain is now Stateside, having barely made it onto the airplane out of Vietnam as Saigon fell." Josh Rosenberg of Esquire wrote, "It's a decent save until the General orders him to kill the presumably innocent Major. Kill a guy for handing out candy? Maybe it’s time for the Captain to figure out how to transition out of the spy game."
