= The Sympathizer (miniseries) =

2024 television miniseries

- Genre: Black comedy; Historical drama; Spy thriller; War drama
- Created by: Park Chan-wook; Don McKellar
- Based on: The Sympathizer by Viet Thanh Nguyen
- Showrunners: Park Chan-wook; Don McKellar
- Directed by: Park Chan-wook; Fernando Meirelles; Marc Munden
- Starring: Hoa Xuande; Robert Downey Jr.; Toan Le; Fred Nguyen Khan; Duy Nguyễn; Vy Le; Ky Duyen; Phanxinê; Kieu Chinh; Alan Trong; Sandra Oh
- Composer: Jo Yeong-wook
- Countries of origin: Canada; United States
- Original languages: English; Vietnamese
- No. of episodes: 7

Production
- Executive producers: Park Chan-wook; Don McKellar; Robert Downey Jr.; Susan Downey; Amanda Burrell; Niv Fichman; Kim Ly; Ron Schmidt; Viet Thanh Nguyen; Jisun Beck; John Sloss; Ravi Nandan; Hallie Sekoff
- Producers: Inman Young; Jes Anderson; Ted Pacult; Kris Baucom
- Production locations: Thailand; United States
- Cinematography: Kim Ji-yong; Barry Ackroyd
- Editors: Jin Lee; Vikash Patel; Fernando Stutz
- Running time: 52-60 minutes
- Production companies: Team Downey; Rhombus Media; Cinetic Media; Moho Film; A24

Original release
- Network: HBO
- Release: April 14 – May 26, 2024

The Sympathizer (Vietnamese: Cảm tình viên) is a historical black comedy-drama television miniseries based on the 2015 Pulitzer Prize-winning novel of the same name by Viet Thanh Nguyen.

The series was created by co-showrunners Park Chan-wook and Don McKellar, with Park directing the first three episodes. The series premiered on HBO on April 14, 2024, and is produced by A24 and Rhombus Media. The series received positive reviews from critics and audiences, with praise for its performances and direction, although there was some criticism for its pacing and inaccuracies with Vietnamese accents. For his performance in the series, Robert Downey Jr. was nominated for Outstanding Supporting Actor in a Limited or Anthology Series or Movie at the 76th Primetime Emmy Awards.

The Sympathizer follows the Captain, a North Vietnamese spy serving undercover in the South Vietnamese army, who flees to the United States as the Vietnam War ends. While living within a community of South Vietnamese refugees in Southern California, he continues to secretly spy on the community and report back to the Communist government. He struggles between his original loyalties and his new life.

== Cast ==
=== Main ===
- Hoa Xuande as the Captain, a captain in the South Vietnamese military who is secretly a communist spy for the North
- Robert Downey Jr. in several roles, including (in order of appearance):
  - Claude, a CIA agent who mentors the Captain
  - Professor Robert Hammer, the Captain's Orientalist professor at Occidental College
  - Ned Godwin, a Congressman in Southern California
  - Niko Damianos, an auteur filmmaker making a film on the Vietnam War, inspired by Francis Ford Coppola and John Landis
  - The Priest, the Captain's French father
- Toan Le as the General (Trọng), a high-ranking Southern Vietnamese general who is the Captain's superior
- Fred Nguyen Khan as Bốn, the Captain's childhood best friend
- Duy Nguyễn as Mẫn, the Captain's other childhood friend and his Communist handler
- Vy Le as Lana, the General's daughter
- Ky Duyen as Madame, the General's wife
- Phanxinê as the Major (Oanh)
- Kieu Chinh as the Major's Mother
- Alan Trong as Sonny Tran, a Vietnamese American reporter and the Captain's former college rival
- Sandra Oh as Sofia Mori, a Japanese American secretary who develops a sexual relationship with the Captain

=== Supporting ===
- VyVy Nguyen as the Major's wife
- Kayli Tran as the Communist Spy
- Scott Ly as Gunner Dao
- David Duchovny as Ryan Glenn, an acclaimed but volatile method actor playing Captain Shamus in The Hamlet, loosely based on Marlon Brando
- John Cho as James Yoon, a Korean-American actor playing Kim in The Hamlet
- Max Whittington-Cooper as Jamie Johnson, a popular soul singer and first-time actor playing Lieutenant Bellamy in The Hamlet
- Marine Delterme as Monique Thibault, the production designer of The Hamlet and Niko's girlfriend
- Phong Le as The Watchman

== Episodes ==
No.	Title	Directed by	Written by	Original release date	U.S. viewers (millions)
1	"Death Wish"	Park Chan-wook	Park Chan-wook and Don McKellar	April 14, 2024	0.206
In a North Vietnamese re-education camp, a man known as the Captain is coerced by soldiers into revealing his story. In 1975, before the Fall of Saigon, the Captain is working as a South Vietnamese secret policeman, though he secretly passes information to the Communists through his friend and handler Man. The Captain meets CIA agent Claude and witnesses the torture of a woman with critical information alongside the General. As tensions rise two months later, Claude informs the Captain and General of the end of their partnership and the need to destroy incriminating documents, promising two planes for their evacuation under Operation Frequent Wind, though they know Claude will only have one plane. The Captain, urged by Man, decides to leave for the U.S., intending to rescue his friend Bon and his family as well. However, as bombs fall and chaos erupts at the airfield, the Captain's attempts to save Bon and his family end in tragedy, with Bon's wife and child killed while the Captain reflects on his failure to protect them.
2	"Good Little Asian"	Park Chan-wook	Park Chan-wook & Don McKellar and Naomi Iizuka	April 21, 2024	0.147
In a North Vietnamese re-education camp, the Captain's confession continues. He and Bon escape Saigon with the bodies of Bon’s wife and baby, eventually reaching Fort Chaffee, Arkansas. The Captain writes to Man in Hanoi while enduring poor conditions. The General struggles to maintain peace among the refugees and is often humiliated. The Captain and Bon move to Los Angeles with sponsorship from Professor Hammer, where the Captain becomes infatuated with Hammer's secretary, Sofia, and starts a relationship with her. Later, the General relocates to Los Angeles with his family, opening a liquor store to gain trust within the South Vietnamese community. He confides in the Captain about a potential mole in his squad, causing concern. The Captain and Claude laugh off rumors that the Captain might be the mole. Claude explains he delayed the General's rescue to make the Captain appreciate his new life in America. The Captain faces tension with Bon, who has become withdrawn and drinks heavily. The Captain decides to frame Major Oanh as the mole, and Bon offers to assist him in killing Oanh.
3	"Love It or Leave It"	Park Chan-wook	Park Chan-wook & Don McKellar and Mark Richard	April 28, 2024	0.081
The Captain and Bon visit the General to discuss the plot against Major Oanh, but the General insists on proceeding with the assignment. On the way home, Bon offers to help rob Oanh to divert suspicion from the Captain and reveals his involvement in the Phoenix Program. They sneak into Oanh’s house but are caught by his family, who mistake them for visitors. They realize Oanh has grown fond of America. At an event, the General reiterates that Oanh must be eliminated. During the Fourth of July fireworks, the Captain sneaks into Oanh’s apartment under the guise of delivering a durian. When his gun is exposed, he forces Oanh to a corner and shoots him in the stomach. Bon intervenes and beats Oanh until the Captain executes him. The Captain informs Claude of the murder, who reveals Oanh had suspected him as the mole but dismissed it. In a flashback, the Captain helps a resistance soldier die rather than confess. After Oanh’s funeral, Claude takes the Captain to meet with Godwin, Hammer, and filmmaker Niko Damianos, who wants the Captain’s involvement in a Vietnam War film. The script triggers memories and hallucinations of Oanh’s corpse for the Captain.
4	"Give Us Some Good Lines"	Fernando Meirelles	Park Chan-wook & Don McKellar	May 5, 2024	0.070
The Captain agrees to help filmmaker Nicos Damianos make his film culturally accurate and travels to the film's set, discovering midway through the drive that Lana, the General's rebellious daughter, has snuck into his trunk. Damianos pushes back on The Captain's suggestions to give the Vietnamese characters more lines, but he agrees to hire Vietnamese extras, including Bon. Lana develops a flirtatious relationship with Jamie Johnson, a pop singer playing one of the lead roles, and tries to expand her role as an extra. Ryan Glenn, another lead actor, becomes increasingly volatile on set as part of his "method acting." Damianos writes a scene where Lana's character, named after the Captain's mother, is raped by Glenn's character. When the Captain objects, Damianos fires him. The Captain intentionally disrupts the rape scene, angering Damianos and Lana. Damianos also ends the film by blowing up the entire village set, unbeknownst to the Captain, who is on set when the pyrotechnics are detonated.
5	"All for One"	Marc Munden	Park Chan-wook & Don McKellar and Maegan Houang	May 12, 2024	0.058
After being seriously injured by Damianos' pyrotechnics, the Captain experiences flashbacks to his childhood friendship with Bon and Mẫn. While recovering in the hospital, he manages to convince studio representatives to increase compensation for his injury. When he is released, he attempts to give the compensation money to Major Oanh's struggling family, but his widow announces she will give the money to the General, who is planning an invasion to take back Vietnam from the Communists. The General tells the Captain about his plan, which he is funding through his wife Madame's popular pho restaurant. The Captain visits Sofia, discovering that she has begun a relationship with Sonny, an investigative journalist for a Vietnamese-language newspaper and the Captain's rival from college. The Captain writes a coded message about the General's plot to Mẫn and anonymously sends photographs of the General's plans to Sonny. When Sonny publishes a story critical of the General's plot, the General expresses suspicion that Sonny may be a Communist agent. The General announces that he must accelerate his plan, showing the Captain the clandestine training grounds for his invasion force and revealing, to the Captain's horror, that Bon is leading the soldiers.
6	"The Oriental Mode of Destruction"	Marc Munden	Park Chan-wook & Don McKellar and Anchuli Felicia King	May 19, 2024	0.062
The Captain learns that the General is preparing a covert mission from Thailand to re-enter Vietnam, with Bon volunteering despite its suicidal nature. Through Congressman Ned Godwin, the Captain uncovers that American officials and the CIA are secretly funding the General’s effort. He also reconnects with Professor Hammer and seeks to expose the plot by sharing evidence with Sonny. As the Captain concern grows over Bon’s involvement and his divided loyalties, he confesses to Sonny that he is a Communist double agent and responsible for Oanh’s death. When Sonny refuses to believe him, the Captain kills him and steals his manuscript detailing the General’s plans. Though he initially intends to destroy the evidence, he falsely reports to his Communist handlers that the article has been submitted for publication. Sofia later confronts the Captain with her suspicions about Sonny’s death, gives him an alibi and ends their relationship. Haunted by guilt and visions of Oanh and Sonny, the Captain ultimately chooses to join the General’s mission. The episode ends with the Captain and Bon departing the United States for Southeast Asia.
7	"Endings Are Hard, Aren't They?"	Marc Munden	Park Chan-wook & Don McKellar	May 26, 2024	0.088

== Production ==
=== Development ===
Author Viet Thanh Nguyen had stated prior to development that any show adapted from his novel The Sympathizer be centered around Vietnamese people speaking Vietnamese. In early meetings, producers were uneasy about this requirement, but this tone shifted following the 2021 Atlanta spa shootings. Around half of the dialogue in the series is in Vietnamese.

In April 2021, Viet Thanh Nguyen announced that the novel had been optioned by A24 to be adapted into a television series with Park Chan-wook directing. Rhombus Media was also listed as involved in the production. In July 2021, HBO ordered the series from A24, and Robert Downey Jr. joined the project in a producer and co-star role. The state of California awarded the production over $17.4 million in tax credits ensuring significant production would take place in state. Marc Munden and Fernando Meirelles were also hired to direct some episodes of the series.

In August 2025, Park and McKellar were expelled from the Writers Guild of America for strikebreaking by writing for the miniseries during the 2023 strike.

=== Casting ===
Casting director Jennifer Venditti opened a worldwide casting call in order to find a main cast of Vietnamese descent, ultimately hiring Hoa Xuande, Fred Nguyen Khan, Toan Le, Vy Le, and Alan Trong. Recurring roles for Sandra Oh, Kieu Chinh, and Nguyen Cao Ky Duyen were also announced in November 2022, and Downey was portraying several supporting antagonistic roles representing the American establishment. In May 2023, Scott Ly and Marine Delterme joined the cast, in recurring roles.

The majority of the cast and crew are of Vietnamese origin, and more than half of the dialogue is in Vietnamese in order to reflect the Vietnamese experience, including refugees in the United States. Hoa Xuande had to take a crash course to improve his Vietnamese to prepare for the main role.

The actor Phanxinê, who is a well-known filmmaker in Vietnam, wanted to keep his involvement in the project private for as long as possible to minimize the political backlash he might receive. He has said that many friends discouraged him from participating. It took him a while to decide to take the role of The Major because the project is politically sensitive. He finally took it because he saw the role as safe as "he shows a good side of Vietnamese men." Fred Nguyen Khan and Duy Nguyễn, who play the Captain's best friends, are also best friends in real life.

=== Filming ===
Filming took place in Los Angeles and Thailand. The crew's numerous attempts to obtain permission to film in Vietnam were rebuffed by its government. The production used Thailand as a stand-in for Vietnamese scenes.

Downey shaved his head for the series in order to save the time required to use a bald cap for each of the various characters he portrayed. A significant portion of Downey's performance was improvised.

== Release ==
The series premiered on HBO and became available to stream on Max on April 14, 2024.

== Reception ==
On the review aggregator website Rotten Tomatoes, 89% of 73 critics' reviews are positive, with an average rating of 8.3/10. The website's consensus reads: "The Sympathizer does a solidly satisfying job of adapting its ambitious source material, conveying its core themes even as it occasionally struggles with its structure." On Metacritic, the series holds a weighted average score of 80 out of 100, based on 38 critics, indicating "generally favorable reviews".

The series received much attention in the large Vietnamese American community in California. Younger viewers believe it presents an opportunity to showcase Vietnamese stories to a global audience. For the older generation, the series had stirred some discontent – they view the focus on the lead character, who was a Communist spy, as glorifying the Communists and disparaging the South. However, the community agrees that this is a significant moment for Vietnamese representation in Hollywood.

=== In Vietnam ===
In Vietnam, the government did not allow the series to be filmed locally, and the completed series was banned from being shown. At the time of the series' premiere, no official Vietnamese translation of The Sympathizer novel (which was released in English in the US) had been published in the country. A major publisher had bought the translation rights years earlier, shortly after the novel won the Pulitzer Prize in the US.

After the series premiered, many articles about its production that were previously published in major newspapers were no longer accessible online, as if there was a censorship directive from the highest level or due to self-censorship, although unevenly applied. An article in the state-run newspaper Tuổi trẻ Thủ đô described the series as "poisonous" and warned that "social media pages belonging to hostile forces [...] acclaimed the content of the series and cleverly integrated details that distorted Vietnamese history to sabotage the Party and the State". It called on young viewers to "heighten vigilance for false information regarding territorial sovereignty as well as Vietnamese history that hostile forces cleverly integrated or propagated via cinematic works." Công an nhân dân, the official mouthpiece of the Ministry of Public Security, stated that the series has "distorted content", was created by "opposing elements", and that the release of the series so close to Reunification Day was made "with negative intention, to distort the triumph of the people of Vietnam."

=== Accolades ===
Award	Year	Category	Nominee(s)	Result	Ref.
Astra TV Awards	2024	Best Supporting Actor in a Limited Series or TV Movie	Robert Downey Jr.	Nominated	
Critics' Choice Television Awards	2025	Best Supporting Actor in a Limited Series or Movie Made for Television	Robert Downey Jr.	Nominated	
Gotham TV Awards	2024	Breakthrough Limited Series	Park Chan-wook, Don McKellar, Jisun Back, Amanda Burrell, Robert Downey Jr., Susan Downey, Niv Fichman, Kim Ly, Ravi Nandan, Viet Thanh Nguyen, Mark Richard, Hallie Sekoff, Ron Schmidt, and John Sloss	Nominated	
Gotham TV Awards	2024	Outstanding Performance in a Limited Series	Hoa Xuande	Nominated	
Independent Spirit Awards	2025	Best Breakthrough Performance in a New Scripted Series	Hoa Xuande	Nominated	
Primetime Emmy Awards	2024	Outstanding Supporting Actor in a Limited or Anthology Series or Movie	Robert Downey Jr.	Nominated	
Satellite Awards	2025	Best Miniseries & Limited Series or Motion Picture Made for Television	The Sympathizer	Nominated	
Satellite Awards	2025	Best Actor in a Miniseries, Limited Series, or Motion Picture Made for Television	Hoa Xuande	Nominated	
Satellite Awards	2025	Best Actor in a Supporting Role in a Series, Miniseries & Limited Series, or Motion Picture Made for Television	Robert Downey Jr.	Won	
Seoul International Drama Awards	2024	Golden Bird Prize	Park Chan-wook	Won	
Television Critics Association Awards	2024	Outstanding Achievement in Movies, Miniseries and Specials	The Sympathizer	Nominated	
