= Xuande (disambiguation) =

The Xuande Emperor (1399–1435, r. 1425-1435) was the fourth emperor of the Chinese Ming dynasty.

Xuande may also refer to:

- Liu Bei (161–223, r. 221–223), courtesy name Xuande, the founding emperor of the Shu Han dynasty.
- Hoa Xuande, an Australian actor.
