= The Refugees (short story collection) =

2017 short story collection by Viet Thanh Nguyen

- First edition cover
- Author: Viet Thanh Nguyen
- Audio read by: Viet Thanh Nguyen
- Cover artist: Christopher Moisan
- Language: English
- Genre: Short stories
- Set in: California and Vietnam
- Publisher: Grove Press
- Publication date: 7 February 2017
- Publication place: United States
- Media type: Print (hardcover and paperback), e-book, audiobook
- Pages: 224
- ISBN: 978-0-8021-2639-9 (hardcover)
- Dewey Decimal: 813/.6
- LC Class: PS3614.G97 A6 2017

The Refugees is a 2017 short story collection by Viet Thanh Nguyen. It is Nguyen's first published short story collection and his first book after winning the Pulitzer Prize for The Sympathizer. The eight-story collection, set in different locations in California and Vietnam, earned favorable reviews from critics, particularly for offering insight into the lives of migrants like those the book depicts.

== Publication history ==
Story	Originally published in
"Black-Eyed Woman"	Epoch
"The Other Man"	Best New American Voices 2007
"War Years"	TriQuarterly
"The Transplant"	Narrative
"I'd Love You to Want Me"	Gulf Coast
"The Americans"	Chicago Tribune
"Someone Else Besides You"	Narrative
"Fatherland"	Narrative

== Synopsis ==
=== "Black-Eyed Women" ===
An unnamed ghostwriter takes up a job to write a memoir about Victor, a man who is stricken with survivor guilt. Living with her mother, the ghostwriter often listens to her mother's ghost stories about people she knew in her past; one of the recurring stories regards her deceased older brother. One night while writing, the ghostwriter is visited by her brother's ghost. After a brief exchange, he disappears when she turns away. The next day the ghostwriter tells her mother about her experience; her mother buys new clothes and asks the ghostwriter to give them to him.

When he returns the following night, the ghostwriter offers him the clothes, but he refuses, saying that ghosts' clothes exist for the living. They talk, which eventually leads to her reminiscing about the day her brother died; they were boat people boarded by pirates. In an attempt to prevent her from being abducted, he cut her hair, bounded her breast, and smeared oil on her face. It worked, but when one pirate grew suspicious, her brother knifed the pirate. In retaliation, the pirate struck him in the head with his rifle, killing him. Before he disappears, he tells her "You died too, you just don't know it."

Before sending in Victor's memoir, she remembers a conversation with him about ghosts; he says he believes in ghosts, that their aura has helped him through his loss. After the book is published, the ghostwriter decides to write her own work about ghosts. She talks to her mother for inspiration, and her mother tells her the story of how a man imprisoned for thirty years "meets" his lost wife through ghosts after his release. She also notes that the ghostwriter's brother will not appear again, as he has made his peace with this world.

The title comes from how the ghostwriter admires the elderly, "black-eyed women" in Vietnam who told ghost stories to passersby.

=== "The Other Man" ===
Liem, an eighteen-year-old refugee, arrives at the San Francisco International Airport and meets his sponsor Parrish Coyne and Marcus Chan, Parrish's lover from Hong Kong. After trading greetings, they drive him to their house in the Mission District. At first, Liem is uncomfortable with Parrish and Marcus's relationship and considers calling his refugee service contact, but instead, he slowly adapts. He also starts working at a liquor store to earn money and uses his downtime to study and write to his parents.

When Parrish goes on a business trip, Liem and Marcus begin to bond. They eat dim sum together and Marcus reveals he was disowned by his father due to his sexuality. When Liem receives a letter from his father, he is at first reluctant to read it, even at Marcus's insistence. A little later, they have sex. When Marcus is asleep, Liem answers a phone call from Parrish before reading the reply from his father, who asks him to "live a correct life." From behind one of the house windows, he catches sight of two men. They turn to face him and the three of them share a fleeting moment together.

=== "War Years" ===
When not attending enrichment summer school, an unnamed boy, works at his parents' convenience store in a Vietnamese enclave in San Jose. The boy is potentially an analog to the author, who speaks of a similar store. He gets a small allowance for his work which he uses to buy comic books and games. One day, Mrs. Hoa enters their store demanding that they contribute money to fighting communism in Vietnam; she says that a group of riled refugees are currently in Thailand gearing up for an assault on the homeland. His mother refuses to pay, citing that it is futile at this point. Before leaving Mrs. Hoa states and she will return. After she is gone, his father reminds his mother that not paying may hurt their business as rumors about their "unpatriotic" behavior could spread throughout the community and turn people against them.

One night, the family experiences a home invasion but precautions are taken by his mother, and the aggressor's inexperience results in minimal injuries and little theft. During church that same week, they run into Mrs. Hoa who says that she will visit their shop next week and will expect a donation. His mother takes this chance to surreptitiously follow Mrs. Hoa home to learn of her address.

Mrs. Hoa visits them the following week demanding "they do their part," but his mother again refuses, calling her an extortionist. Mrs. Hoa reluctantly leaves, and his father reminds his mother again their this act could doom their business. Realizing this to be true, he and his mother travel to Mrs. Hoa house after closing hours, seeking a compromise as well as an apology. When they arrive, they are greeted by a surprised Mrs. Hoa who welcomes them into her house upon insistence. Inside they see a family of nine people from three generations. When his mother catches sight of a soldier's uniform, Mrs. Hoa tells them that it belonged to her husband, who died in the war; she all continues to tell about how she also lost two of her sons. Upon hearing this, his mother offers her condolences and a $200 donation. After they leave, she takes her son to a nearby 7-Eleven, gives him $5, and tells him to buy whatever he wants. Upon browsing the store, the boy is unsure of what he wants to buy.

=== "The Transplant" ===
Arthur Arellano, a middle-aged Mexican-American living in Orange County, stores a boatload of counterfeit goods in his garage as a favor for Louis Vu. About eighteen months prior when Arthur was suffering from liver failure, he was told he only has a short time to live. However, in that terminal period, a donor, Louis's father Men Vu, is matched with Arthur and after a successful transplant, he is healthy again. Although the donor was supposed to remain anonymous, a bug in the hospital computer system results in Arthur receiving mail stating that he has Men's liver. Feeling the need to repay someone, he calls all "Vus" in the directory. After countless calls resulting in dead ends, Louis listens to Arthur's story and says that Men is his father.

Because of his gambling addiction, Arthur's wife Norma often acts coldly towards him. Because of the limited space in their home, he sometimes stays at Louis's place. During one of the stay-overs, Arthur tells Louis about how his brother Martín runs the family landscaping business his father started and Louis tells him about his philosophy regarding the counterfeit business. When he returns home for clean underwear, Norma informs him that a man named Minh Vu called him while he was away. After calling Minh back and listening to him, Arthur learns that Minh is the son of Men Vu and that Louis is not related to the family at all.

Enraged, Arthur returns to Louis's house and confronts him. After Louis admits that he took advantage of the situation, Arthur tells him to retrieve his counterfeits or he will get rid of them in the desert. Louis tells him that if he does, he will report to the authorities regarding Martín's undocumented landscaping workers. Realizing that he has no choice but to comply and leave the goods alone, he dishearteningly returns home. When he sees Norma, he offers her an embrace, but she instead folds her arms.

=== "I'd Love You to Want Me" ===
Mrs. Khanh and her recently retired husband who has Alzheimer's disease live in Westminster, California. During one of their outings at a wedding, she notices that he calls her "Yen," which drives her to think why "Yen" is so important to her husband. The morning after, she cooks breakfast for her visit son Vinh, who gives her advice on how to help stimulate her husband's mind and encourages her to retire from her job as a librarian. As time goes by, her husband's conditions worsen and he continues to call her "Yen" and forgets some of his daily routines. Trying to prevent her husband from calling her "Yen" again, she surreptitiously pens in his diary, "Today I called my wife by the name of Yen. This mistake must not be repeated."

However, this does not work and he even begins to react violently to Mrs. Khanh's presence, which surprises her; he never before lashed out at her, even at his lowest points. She nonetheless helps him, reading to him when he is unable to do so himself. She even confronts him regarding him calling her "Yen," but this is to no avail; he thinks she is crazy. Soon after, she retires to spend more time with him. While they are shelving books together, Mrs. Khanh beings to "love" with her husband again, and even embraces the name "Yen." She then proceeds to read him a short story from a book he gave her as a gift many years ago.

The title comes from the song "I'd Love You to Want Me" which plays at the wedding and causes him to call her "Yen."

=== "The Americans" ===
James Carver, a retired African-American USAF pilot during the Vietnam War, and his wife Michiko, visit their daughter Claire and her boyfriend Legaspi, a roboticist, in Quảng Trị. Carver is apathetic as he did not care much for the country during his war years which leads him to clash with Claire, a language teacher who claims she has a "Vietnamese soul." They argue often over ideology regarding Vietnam and their respective roles in shaping it.

One day, Legaspi takes them to his demining facility and shows Carver and Michiko his workforce and innovations. When Carver comments about how the idea could be used for warfare, Claire impugns him, which causes him to walk out. When a monsoon strikes fifteen brief minutes later, he is drenched and later hospitalized for pneumonia. While resting up, he notices Claire has spent the whole day by his side. That night, when he needs to use the bathroom, Claire helps him and he is reminded of the times many years ago when he did the same for her.

=== "Someone Else Besides You" ===
After the death of his mother, Thomas lives with his father in Echo Park. One day, because his father's car was stolen, Thomas drives his father to see Mimi, his father's longtime mistress turned girlfriend. His father also frequently mentions how Thomas lacks courage because he lost his ex-wife Sam's love because he was not sure about having children with her.

They decide to pay a surprise visit to Sam, who lives across town. They find her pregnant, and she invites them inside her home. After discussing their respective lives, she reveals that she went to Vietnam last summer after the divorce. She encourages them to also take such vacations, but Thomas's father swears that such a visit would do him no good. Before leaving, Thomas asks who the father of the unborn child is, but Sam does not answer and tells him not to come back. Thomas's father slashes Sam's car's tires and hurls a boulder at the windshield before they slyly leave the neighborhood. When they return home, Thomas then helps his father to bed before falling asleep himself.

A few days later, Sam confronts him regarding damages to her car; Thomas offers her an envelope filled with money without revealing that his father did it. After a heated exchange, he bends down and puts his ear by her belly, saying "I can be the father." His father emerges from his room, sees them, and observe what they will do next.

The title comes from how Mimi asks Thomas during one of their rare meetings, "Aren't there times when you'd rather be someone else besides you?"

=== "Fatherland" ===
Phuong, her father Mr. Ly, mother, and two brothers live in the 21st century Saigon. They receive news that Mr. Ly's daughter from his first marriage, who is also named Phuong but adopted the name Vivien, is coming to visit them from Chicago. During their outings, Vivien spends lavishly and the family concedes because Vivien insists and they believe that she is a physician.

During the vacation, the family learns many things about each other. Phuong learns that Vivien's mother escaped Vietnam via boat, to the reluctance of Mr. Ly. When Vivien asks why he named both of his daughters Phuong, he replies that he did so because he knew Vivien would not return to Vietnam decades later without a compelling reason; he believes that to see her sister of the same name was his best chance of making that happen. Near the end of Vivien's trip, he escorts his daughters on one of his guided tours of the Củ Chi tunnels. He speaks of the tunnel as if he is sympathetic to a communist victory of Vietnam, which alarms Vivien, but Phuong assures her it is an act for tourists.

On Vivien's penultimate night in Vietnam, she gives gifts to the family. When she is alone with Phuong she confesses that she does not feel close with her father. During their visit to an amusement park the next day, the two share a pod on a Ferris wheel where Phuong tells Vivien she wants to be like her: self-sufficient and independent. Upon hearing this, Vivien then makes her ultimate confession: she is not a doctor at all; she is actually a former receptionist who has used her severance pay for this vacation. She also tries to absolve herself by saying that it was her mother, a serial liar, who told their father of her facade of success. Phuong asks Vivien if she could sponsor her to the United States, at which point Vivien reveals that she is also drowning in credit card debt. When the family receives a letter and photographs from Vivien a month later, Phuong reacts bitterly; she secretly burns her portion of the pictures, knowing the truth about Vivien.

== Reception ==
The Refugees received widely favorable reviews. Kirkus Reviews stated that "Nguyen is the foremost literary interpreter of the Vietnamese experience in America, to be sure. But his stories, excellent from start to finish, transcend ethnic boundaries to speak to human universals."

Writing in The Washington Post, Megan Mayhew Bergman described The Refugees as "an important and incisive book written by a major writer with firsthand knowledge of the human rights drama exploding on the international stage — and the talent to give us inroads toward understanding it."

Reviewing the collection for The New Yorker, writer Joyce Carol Oates said though these stories are less "stylized and experimental" than Nguyen's novel The Sympathizer (published in 2016, but written after many of the stories in this collection), all of his "fiction is pervaded by a shared intensity of vision, by stinging perceptions that drift like windblown ashes."

Aram Mrjoian, for The Chicago Review of Books, said that "The stories themselves are expansive and well paced; each one builds steadily and confidently. For some, eight stories may seem like a spare collection, but The Refugees doesn’t dabble in flash fiction—there are no palate cleansers between courses. Instead, The Refugees serves up elegant, hearty stories full of vibrant language and memorable characters."

In the Yale Review of International Studies, Chase Finney said that "Nguyen asks readers not to pity his characters, but instead take a step back from the back-and-forth of media coverage and see his characters–and hopefully by extension, all refugees–as human beings simply seeking to be understood."

Michael Schaub, writing for NPR, wrote that The Refugees is "an urgent, wonderful collection that proves that fiction can be more than mere storytelling — it can bear witness to the lives of people who we can't afford to forget."

Yiyun Li, in The Guardian, wrote that "With anger but not despair, with reconciliation but not unrealistic hope, and with genuine humour that is not used to diminish anyone, Nguyen has breathed life into many unforgettable characters."

== Awards ==
- Honor, 2017 Asian/Pacific American Award for Literature
