= The Man with Two Faces =

The Man with Two Faces is the title of two movies:

- The Man with Two Faces (1934 film), starring Edward G. Robinson and Mary Astor
- The Man with Two Faces (1975 film), a South Korean horror film

== See also ==
- Man with Two Faces, a chapter of the Japanese manga Saint Seiya
- A Man of Two Faces, a 2024 memoir by Viet Thanh Nguyen
