= A Stitch in Time (2022 film) =

- Directed by: Sasha Hadden
- Written by: Sasha Hadden
- Produced by: Sasha Hadden
- Starring: Maggie Blinco; Glenn Shorrock; Belinda Giblin; Hoa Xuande; John Gregg
- Cinematography: Donald McAlpine
- Edited by: Sasha Hadden
- Music by: Angela Little
- Release date: 2022
- Running time: 98 minutes
- Country: Australia
- Language: English

A Stitch in Time is a 2022 Australian drama film directed by Sasha Hadden.

== Cast ==
- Maggie Blinco as Liebe
- Glenn Shorrock as Duncan
- John Gregg as Justin
- Belinda Giblin as Christine
- Hoa Xuande as Hamish
- Celeste Reardon as Summerly

== Synopsis ==
In Sydney's inner-west, Liebe (Maggie Blinco) a former Jewish refugee in her 80s, is in an abusive relationship with Duncan (Glenn Shorrock), a bitter and unsuccessful musician, who had forced Liebe to give up her aspirations for dressmaking when they first got together.

After a woeful gig at the local RSL, Duncan is fired by the manager and they part ways acrimoniously. Duncan meets with Justin (John Gregg), his old best friend and ex-member of his former band, in hopes that together they can record an album and have another shot at success. However, there is too much animosity between the pair and a reunion does not transpire.

Liebe throws herself into helping Duncan realise his dream to record an album, turning to dressmaking once more to find his dreams. This reignites her passion for her craft. When Duncan’s behaviour worsens, Liebe finally walks away from her relationship and moves in with Justin and his wife – her best friend, Christine (Belinda Giblin).

When Liebe begins selling her dresses at the markets, she meets Hamish (Hoa Xuande), a young Chinese fashion designer, after his girlfriend, Summerly tries on one of Liebe’s dresses. From there, she establishes a successful online shop and moves into houseshare accommodation with some Chinese students.

== Production ==
The film was Sasha Hadden's directorial debut. He was inspired by the film Driving Miss Daisy. Hadden wrote the script with Jack Thompson in mind for the role of Duncan, but he was unavailable. Instead, former Little River Band frontman Shorrock landed the role upon Maggie Blinco's suggestion.

The film was shot on location in Sydney (including scenes at the Balmain Markets and Galston Country Club), with a crew of only twenty, over an eight week period.

== Release ==
A Stitch in Time was released in Australian cinemas on 17 February 2022.

== Reception ==
Cath Clarke from The Guardian wrote: "It’s a movie with all its edges filed down and a soundtrack that doesn’t so much tug at the heartstrings as yank them. But 89-year-old actor Maggie Blinco gives a performance of such gentleness and dignity she pulls the quality up from its Hallmark level."

Film critic David Stratton from At the Movies, gave the film four stars, and called it a "genuine charmer", also saying: "the film is filled with pleasant surprises, not least the accomplished performances. Blinco's Liebe is a warm-hearted character who allowed herself to be dominated for far too long, and to see her discover a new world of freedom makes for a most satisfying, although modest, local production."

Graeme Tuckett from Stuff said "A Stitch In Time is a wee gem. Debutant director and writer Sasha Hadden might ladle on the sentiment a little thickly on the home straight, but every move he makes that gets us there is well executed. The situation and dialogue are credible and surprisingly gritty at times, the cast are as generous and skilled as any director could hope for."

== Awards ==
The film received the 2022 AACTA Award for Best Indie Film. It also received a nomination for Best Original Score in Film, with music composed by Angela Little.
