= A Man of Two Faces =

2023 memoir by Viet Thanh Nguyen

A Man of Two Faces: A Memoir, A History, A Memorial
- Author: Viet Thanh Nguyen
- Cover artist: Kelly Winton
- Genre: Memoir, biography
- Publisher: Grove Press
- Publication date: October 8, 2023
- Pages: 400
- ISBN: 978-0802160508

A Man of Two Faces: A Memoir, A History, A Memorial is a 2023 memoir by the Vietnamese-American writer Viet Thanh Nguyen. Experimental in form, the book oscillates between Nguyen's personal experiences of fleeing Vietnam during the Vietnam War as well as broader reflections on topics like nationhood and colonialism. In addition to several other awards, accolades, and list mentions, the book was longlisted for the 2023 National Book Award for Nonfiction.

== Contents ==
The individual pictured on the book's cover is an illustrated version of Nguyen's father by cover designer Kelly Winton.

Nguyen stated that the book is the book "which I never wanted to write" due to its personal nature. The book comprises many of Nguyen's essays, lectures, and interviews since the release of his Pulitzer Prize–winning novel The Sympathizer in 2015, which cover a wide variety of topics including but not limited to the Vietnam War, the Trump presidency, Sinophobia during the COVID-19 pandemic, hate crimes, George Floyd, and Francis Ford Coppola's Apocalypse Now. With regard to personal matters, Nguyen writes about his family's escape from Buôn Ma Thuột in 1975 at the age of four, as well as his childhood stints in Harrisburg, Pennsylvania and San Jose, California. Nguyen also writes about his memories of his mother. Mentioned, as well, is Maxine Hong Kingston's mentorship of Nguyen while he attended the University of California, Berkeley.

An excerpt of the book, "A Departure From Reality", was featured in The New Yorker in September 2023, a month before the book's release.

== Critical reception ==
Kirkus Reviews noted that the experimental, multimedia form of the book could turn away "Readers seeking the anchor of narrative" but nonetheless lauded his "fragmentary reflection of the refugee experience". In a starred review, Publishers Weekly found the "dazzling hybrid of prose of poetry" "bold and ambitious".

The New York Times found the more polemical parts of the book "so unspecific the risk banality" insofar as "These revelations offer little we don’t already know" but praised the more personal aspects, citing Nguyen's "prodigious gift for distilling memory, and its absence, into words that cannot be lost." NPR praised the wide-ranging capacity of the book: "Taken together, Nguyen's novels, critical essays, and short fiction paint a dynamic, multifaceted portrait of the author." Lisa Ko, writing in The Washington Post, found the book both "audacious" in its swath of subject matter but also "playful" in form and voice. Similarly, Alta Journal found that "This intuitive, intrinsic sense of play energizes and animates the narrative". Meanwhile, The Sunday Times found Nguyen's style overwhelming of substance.

Electric Literature included the book on their list of Best Nonfiction of 2023. Amazon included it in their "hand-selected" list of the 100 best books of the year. It was shortlisted for the Baillie Gifford Prize and the Big Other Book Award for Nonfiction, as well as longlisted for the Andrew Carnegie Medal for Excellence in Nonfiction.
