= To Save and to Destroy =

2025 essay collection by Viet Thanh Nguyen

To Save and to Destroy: Writing as an Other
- Author: Viet Thanh Nguyen
- Publisher: Belknap Press
- Publication date: April 8, 2025
- Pages: 144
- ISBN: 978-0674298170

To Save and to Destroy: Writing as an Other is a 2025 essay collection by Pulitzer Prize–winning Vietnamese American writer and professor Viet Thanh Nguyen. It was published by Belknap Press, an imprint of Harvard University Press.

== Background ==
The book is an "edited compilation" of the six Norton Lectures which Viet had delivered to Harvard University from 2023–2024. Viet had drafted the lectures, while in Paris, during the preceding summer. Its release, on April 8, 2025, coincides with the fiftieth anniversary of the end of the Vietnam War and specifically Black April.

Between the second and third Norton Lecture, the October 7 attacks happened, prompting Viet "to address that and all of its consequences" by writing an argument establishing solidarity between Palestinians and Asian Americans: "I felt like there was an organic relationship for me to Palestinian thought and anti-colonial thinking that was deeply tied into the Vietnam War and to me becoming an American."

Excerpts of the lectures were published in LitHub days after its release.

== Lectures ==
1. "On the Double, or Inauthenticity"
2. "On Speaking for an Other"
3. "On Palestine and Asia"
4. "On Crossing Borders"
5. "On Being Minor"
6. "On the Joy of Otherness"

== Critical reception ==
Publishers Weekly stated that "The entries are consistently thought-provoking and cogently argued. This will leave readers with plenty to chew on." Kirkus Reviews called it "A provocative exploration of the writer as storyteller, anthropologist, and knowing outsider."

May-lee Chai, writing for Star Tribune, lauded Viet's humor, as well as the strength of his family stories and his adroitness as a storyteller. R. O. Kwon called the book "Brilliant, rigorous, and generous... part autobiography, part criticism, and wholly illuminating. A dazzling feat from one of today's great writers and thinkers." Rebecca Brody, for Library Journal, found it "essential" in its discussions of craft, diversity, and diasporic experiences.
