= Barry Ackroyd =

British cinematographer

- Born: 12 May 1954 (age 72); Oldham, Lancashire, England
- Years active: 1980–present
- Website: barryackroyd.com

Barry Ackroyd (born 12 May 1954) is an English cinematographer and former president of the British Society of Cinematographers.

He received a nomination for the Academy Award for Best Cinematography for his work on Kathryn Bigelow's war film The Hurt Locker.

== Life and career ==
Ackroyd was born in Oldham, England. He received a BAFTA nomination for Best Cinematography for The Lost Prince. His latest credits are on Ken Loach's award-winning feature, The Wind That Shakes The Barley, Paul Greengrass's take on the 9-11 disaster, United 93, and the Kathryn Bigelow-directed Iraq War film, The Hurt Locker.

Film reviewer Jack Matthews of the New York Daily News remarked about the filmmaking behind The Wind That Shakes The Barley: "Beautifully shot, both in darkened homes and on the misty green Irish landscape by Loach's frequent cinematographer Barry Ackroyd, "Wind" has a you-are-there intensity and intimacy about it that make it nearly overwhelming."

== Filmography ==
=== Television ===
TV movies

Year	Title	Director
1987	Big George Is Dead	Henry Martin
1996	Hillsborough	Charles McDougall
1997	Bumping the Odds	Rob Rohrer
2002	Sunday	Dominic Savage
2003	The Lost Prince	Stephen Poliakoff
2003	Eroica	Simon Cellan Jones
2005	Friends and Crocodiles	Stephen Poliakoff
2005	Gideon's Daughter	Stephen Poliakoff
2010	The Special Relationship	Richard Loncraine
2011	The Miraculous Year	Kathryn Bigelow
2013	The Missionary	Baltasar Kormákur

TV series

Year	Title	Director	Notes
1993	Spender	Ian Knox	Episode "Retreat"
1993	ScreenPlay	Les Blair	Episode "The Merrihill Millionaires"
1995–1996	Screen Two	Tim Fywell; Michael Whyte	Episodes "Life After Life" and "Flowers of the Forest"
2012	The Newsroom	Greg Mottola	Episode "We Just Decided To"
2024	The Sympathizer	Fernando Meirelles	Episode "Give Us Some Good Lines"

=== Feature film ===
Year	Title	Director	Notes
1991	Riff-Raff	Ken Loach	
1993	Raining Stones	Ken Loach	
1994	Ladybird, Ladybird	Ken Loach	
1995	Land and Freedom	Ken Loach	
1996	Carla's Song	Ken Loach	
1996	Stella Does Tricks	Coky Giedroyc	
1997	Under the Skin	Carine Adler	
1998	My Name Is Joe	Ken Loach	
1999	The Lost Son	Chris Menges	
1999	Beautiful People	Jasmin Dizdar	
1999	Mauvaise Passe	Michel Blanc	
2000	Bread and Roses	Ken Loach	
2001	Very Annie Mary	Sara Sugarman	
2001	Dust	Milcho Manchevski	
2001	The Navigators	Ken Loach	With Mike Eley
2002	Sweet Sixteen	Ken Loach	
2003	Os Imortais	António-Pedro Vasconcelos	
2004	Ae Fond Kiss...	Ken Loach	
2005	Love + Hate	Dominic Savage	
2006	The Wind That Shakes the Barley	Ken Loach	
2006	United 93	Paul Greengrass	
2007	Battle in Seattle	Stuart Townsend	
2009	The Hurt Locker	Kathryn Bigelow	
2009	Looking for Eric	Ken Loach	
2010	Green Zone	Paul Greengrass	
2011	Coriolanus	Ralph Fiennes	
2012	Contraband	Baltasar Kormákur	
2013	Captain Phillips	Paul Greengrass	
2013	Parkland	Peter Landesman	
2015	Dark Places	Gilles Paquet-Brenner	
2015	The Big Short	Adam McKay	
2016	Jason Bourne	Paul Greengrass	
2016	The Last Face	Sean Penn	
2017	Detroit	Kathryn Bigelow	
2018	Outlaw King	David Mackenzie	
2019	Bombshell	Jay Roach	
2020	The Old Guard	Gina Prince-Bythewood	With Tami Reiker
2021	Sweet Girl	Brian Andrew Mendoza	
2022	Whitney Houston: I Wanna Dance with Somebody	Kasi Lemmons	
2025	The Old Guard 2	Victoria Mahoney	
2025	A House of Dynamite	Kathryn Bigelow	

=== Documentary works ===
Film

Year	Title	Director
1990	Hunters and Bombers	Hugh Brody; Nigel Markham
1991	The Leader, His Driver, and the Driver's Wife	Nick Broomfield
1992	Aileen Wuornos: The Selling of a Serial Killer	Nick Broomfield
1995	Anne Frank Remembered	Jon Blair

TV series

Year	Title	Director	Notes
1988	40 Minutes	Sam Organ	Episode "Diary of a Frontliner"
1989	Dispatches	Shari Robertson	Episode "Return to Year Zero?"
1989	Split Screen	Ken Loach	Episode "Time to Go"
1988–1989	Byline	Marjorie Wallace; David Collison	Episodes "Whose Mind Is It Anyway?" and "Johnny and Alf Go Home"
1993	Nova	Dave Duncan	Episode "The Real Jurassic Park"
1996	Modern Times	Ken Loach	Episode "The Flickering Flame"
2003	The Blues	Mike Figgis	Episode "Red, White and Blues"

== Awards and nominations ==
Year	Award	Category	Title	Result
2009	Academy Awards	Best Cinematography	The Hurt Locker	Nominated
2006	BAFTA Awards	Best Cinematography	United 93	Nominated
2009	BAFTA Awards	Best Cinematography	The Hurt Locker	Won
2013	BAFTA Awards	Best Cinematography	Captain Phillips	Nominated
2009	American Society of Cinematographers	Outstanding Cinematography	The Hurt Locker	Nominated
2013	American Society of Cinematographers	Outstanding Cinematography	Captain Phillips	Nominated

Other awards

Year	Title	Award/Nomination
2009	The Hurt Locker	Boston Society of Film Critics Award for Best Cinematography; Chicago Film Critics Association Award for Best Cinematography; Houston Film Critics Society Award for Best Cinematography; Nominated – Critics' Choice Movie Award for Best Cinematography; Nominated – Dallas–Fort Worth Film Critics Award for Best Cinematography; Nominated – Los Angeles Film Critics Association Award for Best Cinematography; Nominated – National Society of Film Critics Award for Best Cinematography; Nominated – Online Film Critics Society Award for Best Cinematography; Nominated – St. Louis Gateway Film Critics Award for Best Cinematography
