= The Committed =

2021 novel by Viet Thanh Nguyen

- First edition cover
- Author: Viet Thanh Nguyen
- Audio read by: Francois Chau
- Cover artist: Christopher Moisan
- Language: English
- Genre: Historical; crime thriller; political
- Set in: Paris in the 1980s
- Publisher: Grove Press
- Publication date: March 2, 2021
- Publication place: United States
- Media type: Print (hardback), e-book, audiobook
- Pages: 368
- ISBN: 978-0-8021-5706-5 (hardcover)
- OCLC: 1224586967
- Dewey Decimal: 813/.6
- LC Class: PS3614.G97 C66 2021
- Preceded by: The Sympathizer

The Committed is a 2021 historical crime thriller novel by Viet Thanh Nguyen, published by Grove Press on March 2, 2021. It is his second novel and the sequel to his debut novel The Sympathizer (2015). The story is set in the early 1980s and depicts the anonymous narrator, a former North Vietnamese mole who leaves Vietnam by boat and arrives in Paris. Traumatized by his reeducation, the narrator engages in drug dealing to survive and becomes entangled with the local organized crime syndicates.

== Plot ==
In the early 1980s, the narrator and his blood brother Bon are allowed to leave the re-education camp in Vietnam and arrive in Paris, where they stay with the narrator's "aunt", a French-Vietnamese communist sympathizer. They meet "the Boss", the leader of a local crime syndicate that is run out of an Asian restaurant, and begin to work for him by selling hashish and cocaine, the latter which the narrator nicknames "the Remedy".

Bon persuades the narrator to join the local Vietnamese Union to investigate it for communists. While delivering drugs, the narrator is attacked by two rival French-Algerian gangsters. He recovers in a brothel named Heaven that is guarded by a black man who introduces him to Fanon and Césaire. He meets Madeleine, a Cambodian prostitute, and the Ronin, a partner of the Boss. One evening, the narrator discusses the Cambodian genocide and communism with his aunt and her guests, a French politician nicknamed BFD and an intellectual nicknamed the Maoist PhD. The discussion turns heated and the narrator uses the Remedy to cope.

When he returns to drug dealing, he is kidnapped and tortured by the French-Algerians, led by a man he nicknames the Mona Lisa. Le Cao Boi and the Ronin rescue the narrator while the Mona Lisa escapes, and the narrator is told that he was found with the help of an old Indochina acquaintance. He is taken to a private sanitarium in the countryside which he nicknames Paradise.

After he recovers, Bon tells him that the faceless man, the commissar of their re-education camp, is visiting Paris and that Bon intends to kill him. Additionally, the narrator's former lover Lana will be performing at Fantasia, a Vietnamese concert that the faceless man will attend. After a cultural performance by the Vietnamese Union, the aunt introduces the narrator to the Pol Pot's lawyer, and they discuss whether the unforgivable can be forgiven. Later, he overhears the aunt and the lawyer having sex. In the morning, he is introduced to feminist theorists including Cixous and Kristeva. He meets Madeleine again and performs oral sex on her. The Ronin tells the narrator that they have found the Mona Lisa, and they kidnap and torture him in a warehouse. The narrator refuses to participate, instead discussing French colonialism with the Mona Lisa before telling him that he forgives him.

The Boss organizes a colonial-themed orgy that the narrator attends as serving staff. The participants are white, wealthy and powerful men, some who are in blackface. The staff and the prostitutes from Heaven are dressed as various racial and sexual caricatures, with the latter presented to the guests in the form of an auction. The event is revealed to be an elaborate plan by the Boss to blackmail the men involved with tapes of the recorded orgy.

Afterwards, the Boss, the Ronin, Le Cao Boi, and the narrator return and interrogate the Mona Lisa to no avail. Two masked gunmen rescue him, killing the Boss, the Ronin, and Le Cao Boi in the process. One of them is Saïd, the Mona Lisa's older brother. The narrator is allowed to escape, and he goes to the Boss's apartment where he is confronted by the Boss's secretary. They unlock the Boss's safe and divide the money. The narrator leaves half of his share with the sleeping Madeleine.

The narrator meets Bon, Bon's lover Loan, and Lana at Fantasia's club venue, and Lana reveals that he has a three-year old daughter. During the performance, he and Bon pursue the faceless man to the bathroom, then he drives Bon and the faceless man to the Asian restaurant.

In the empty restaurant, the faceless man reveals his true identity as Man, the blood brother that Bon had thought died in Saigon. However, Bon refuses to believe him, so the narrator reveals his identity as a former North Vietnamese spy. In his despair, Bon commits suicide. Man returns to Vietnam and the narrator is checked into Paradise, where he writes his second confession which is read by his aunt, the Maoist PhD, and the lawyer. A shadow enters his room and is revealed to be Claude, the Indochina hand that was the narrator's previous CIA mentor. Claude aims a gun at the narrator and commands him to remove the mask from his face.

== Characters ==
- Vo Danh: the narrator and protagonist, a half-Vietnamese half-French man who is plagued by bouts of uncontrollable weeping
- Bon: the blood brother of Vo Danh, a militant anticommunist
- The narrator's aunt: a French-Vietnamese editor living in Paris with communist sympathies
- The Boss: a Vietnamese-Chinese crime boss that Bon saved in the Indonesian refugee camp
- Le Cao Boi: the ethnic Chinese right-hand man of the Boss
- The Ronin: a Corsican partner of the Boss
- BFD: a French politician known only by his initials
- The faceless man: Man, the Commissar of the reeducation camp who is also Bon and the narrator's blood brother

== Reception ==
In its starred review, Kirkus Reviews wrote, "Nguyen is deft at balancing his hero's existential despair with the lurid glow of a crime saga." Publishers Weekly, in its starred review, praised "the narrator's hair-raising escapes, descriptions of the Boss's hokey bar, and thoughtful references to Fanon and Césaire." The New York Times praised the first hundred pages of The Committed as "better than anything in the first novel," while regarding the second half as, "shaggy, shaggy, shaggy."

== Sequel ==
In a 2022 interview, Nguyen stated that The Committed is intended to be the second novel in a trilogy, and the final novel will follow the narrator's return to the Americas "to confront again, this so called American narrative about the inevitable triumph of the individual, which obviously, he continues to reject."
