= Marc Munden =

English film and television director

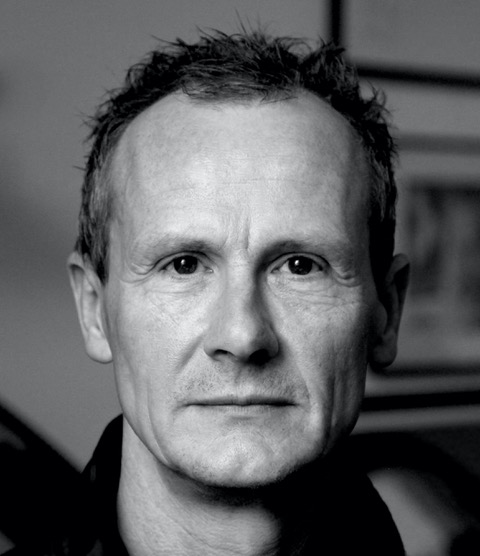
- Munden in 2017
- Born: London, England
- Occupation: Director
- Years active: 1991–present
- Honours: British Academy of Film and Television Arts; Royal Television Society Award; International Emmy Award; Peabody Award

Marc Munden is an English film director best known for his work on Utopia, National Treasure and The Mark of Cain among others.

== Early life ==
Munden was born in London, England. His father, Maxwell Munden, was a filmmaker who made films for the Ministry of Information (United Kingdom) during World War II. One such film was Song of the People which was a musical about factory workers. Munden studied Maths and Philosophy at University College London.

== Career ==
The ending and credit sequence to episode 1 of National Treasure

Munden began his career as an assistant to Mike Leigh, Derek Jarman, and Terence Davies before directing documentaries for television at the BBC.

His first film, Bermondsey Boy (1991), was a documentary examining some of the myths of masculinity, which won a Silver Plaque at the Chicago International Film Festival and was nominated for the BFI Award for Innovation.

In 2007 Munden directed The Mark of Cain, picking up the BAFTA Award for Best Single Drama and earning Munden his first nomination for Best Director. He also received BAFTA nominations for The Devil's Whore (2009) and The Crimson Petal and the White (2011).

=== Utopia ===
Munden went on to direct the cult hit Utopia (2013–2014). The series received high praise for its striking visuals, but also some expressions of concern about its violence. Mark Monahan of The Daily Telegraph described it as “a dark, tantalisingly mysterious overture,” while Sam Wollaston of The Guardian called it “a work of brilliant imagination,” “a 21st-century nightmare” that “looks beautiful,” but also wondered about the gratuitousness of its violence. The series won an International Emmy Award for Best Drama Series in 2014 and Munden received a BAFTA nomination for Best Director.

=== 2016 - present: Awards success ===
In 2016 Munden directed National Treasure starring Robbie Coltrane, Julie Walters and Andrea Riseborough. The series focuses on a beloved British TV comic who gets accused of rape. Over the course of the series, the show examines the psychology of this man as well as how his family perceive him. National Treasure received critical acclaim upon release with many reviewers noting the sensitivity of Jack Thorne's screenwriting, the nuanced character portrayals and Munden's distinctive artistic style. Munden would go on to win the BAFTA for Best Director and the series overall won Best Miniseries.

In 2017 Munden teamed up with writer Tony Grisoni to make Crazy Diamond as part of the Channel 4/Amazon Video anthology series Philip K. Dick's Electric Dreams.

In 2018 it was announced that Munden was to helm the film The Secret Garden for David Heyman & Studiocanal. Based on Frances Hodgson Burnett’s 1911 book, the story centers on Mary Lennox, a troubled, sickly, 10-year-old orphan who is sent to live with an uncle in England when her parents die in a cholera outbreak.

In 2020, Munden reunited with Utopia creator Dennis Kelly, directing the first three episodes of Kelly's HBO/Sky miniseries The Third Day. In 2021, he teamed with Jack Thorne for the Channel 4 drama Help, about a young care home worker struggling during the early days of the COVID-19 pandemic in the UK.

Help was nominated for six British Academy Television Awards winning two for Jodie Comer and Cathy Tyson.

In October 2022, it was announced that Munden's next project would be a series adaptation of Never Let Me Go. The series would have aired on FX and would have been produced by DNA TV, Searchlight Television and FXP. Andrew Macdonald, Allon Reich and Melissa Iqbal would have executive produced alongside Munden. It would have also premiered on Hulu in the United States, Star in other territories and Star+ in Latin America, with Viola Prettejohn, Tracey Ullman and Kelly Macdonald taking on starring roles. FX ultimately chose not to move forward with the adaptation.

In January 2023, Munden was announced as one of the directors for HBO's The Sympathizer, joining directors Park Chan-wook and Fernando Meirelles. Munden directed the final three episodes of the series, which starred Hoa Xuande alongside Robert Downey Jr. and was based on the Pulitzer Prize-winning novel of the same name.

In September 2024, it was announced that Munden's next project would be an adaptation of Lord of the Flies for the BBC. The series will see Munden reteam with writer Jack Thorne as well as be joined by composer Hans Zimmer.

== Filmography ==
=== Films ===
Director

- Beverly Hills Is Bournemouth with Sunshine (1989)
- Miranda (2002)
- The Secret Garden (2020)

=== Television ===
TV movies

- Arthouse: Rebel with a Cause (1997)
- Christmas (1996)
- Shiny Shiny Bright New Hole in My Heart (2006)
- The Mark of Cain (2007)
- Some Dogs Bite (2010)
- The Third Day: Autumn (2020)
- Help (2021)

TV series

Year	Title	Episodes
1991	From Wimps to Warriors	"Bermondsey Boy"
1993	Forty Minutes	"Girl Friends"
1995	Modern Times	
1997	Touching Evil	"Killing With Kindness: Part 1"; "Killing With Kindness: Part 2"
1998	Vanity Fair	Episode 1.1; Episode 1.2; Episode 1.3; Episode 1.4; Episode 1.5; Episode 1.6
2000	The Secret World of Michael Fry (2000 TV series)	Episode 1.1; Episode 1.2
2003	Canterbury Tales	"The Knight's Tale"
2004	Conviction	Episode 1; Episode 2; Episode 3
2008	The Devil's Mistress	Episode 1.1; Episode 1.2; Episode 1.3; Episode 1.4
2011	The Crimson Petal and the White	Episode 1.1; Episode 1.2; Episode 1.3; Episode 1.4
2014	Black Sails	V.; VII.
2013-2014	Utopia	"Episode #1.1"; "Episode #1.2"; "Episode #1.3"; "Episode #2.1"; "Episode #2.2"; "Episode #2.3"
2015	Quantico	"Run"
2016	National Treasure	"Episode #1.1"; "Episode #1.2"; "Episode #1.3"; "Episode #1.4"
2017	Electric Dreams	"Crazy Diamond"
2020	The Third Day	"Friday - The Father"; "Saturday - The Son"; "Sunday - The Ghost"
2024	The Sympathizer	"All for One"; "The Oriental Mode of Destruction"; "Endings Are Hard, Aren't They?"
2026	Lord of the Flies	"Episode #1.1"; "Episode #1.2"; "Episode #1.3"; "Episode #1.4"
