= Marine Delterme =

French actress (born 1970)

- Delterme in 2026
- Born: 18 March 1970 (age 56); Toulouse, France
- Occupations: Actress, painter & sculptor, ex-model
- Years active: 1990–present
- Spouse: Florian Zeller (m. 2010)
- Children: 2

Marine Delterme (French pronunciation: [maʁin dɛltɛʁm]; born 18 March 1970) is a French actress, painter, sculptor and former model.

== Early and personal life ==
Marine Delterme was born in Toulouse, France, and grew up in Paris. Her father was an engineer and her mother a superintendent at Lycée Chaptal, a Paris high school, where they lived. From an early age she was interested in and displayed an aptitude for art.

Delterme has been married to Florian Zeller, a French novelist and playwright, since 2010. They live in Paris. She has two sons: Roman (born 2008) with Zeller, and Gabriel (born 1998) from a previous relationship with the actor Jean-Philippe Écoffey.

She is best friends with Carla Bruni and was one of the witnesses for Bruni at her wedding to French President Nicolas Sarkozy on 2 February 2008, which took place at the Élysée Palace, Paris.

== Career ==
She began modeling when she was 17. She lived for a time in New York City with Carla Bruni, but returned to France to start an acting career. Most of her roles have been in French-language films. She has also appeared in roles for television and is the star of the popular French TV show, "Le Juge est Une Femme".

In addition, she is an artist and has exhibited her sculptures in Paris and New York.

== Filmography ==
The following is an incomplete list of her movie roles:

- 1988: Puissance de la parole, directed by Jean-Luc Godard.
- 1992: Listopad, directed by Lukasz Karwowski (Sara).
- 1992: Savage Nights (Les Nuits fauves), directed by Cyril Collard (Sylvie).
- 1993: La Soif de l'or, directed by Gérard Oury (Laurence)
- 1995: When the Cat's Away (Chacun cherche son chat), directed by Cédric Klapisch.
- 1998: Michael Kael vs. the World News Company, directed by Christophe Smith (Paola Maertens)
- 2000: Vatel, directed by Roland Joffé (Athenaïs de Montespan).
- 2002: The Council of Egypt (Le Conseil d'Égypte), directed by Emidio Greco (Countess of Regalpetra).
- 2002: Once Upon an Angel (Peau d'Ange), directed by Vincent Pérez (Mme Faivre).
