= The Sympathizer =

2015 novel by Viet Thanh Nguyen

- First edition cover
- Author: Viet Thanh Nguyen
- Audio read by: François Chau
- Cover artist: Christopher Moisan
- Language: English
- Genre: Spy fiction, Historical
- Set in: Los Angeles, Vietnam
- Publisher: Grove Press
- Publication date: April 7, 2015
- Publication place: United States
- Media type: Print (hardback & paperback), e-book, audiobook
- Pages: 416 pp.
- Awards: Pulitzer Prize for Fiction (2016); Edgar Award for Best First Novel (2016); Dayton Literary Peace Prize for Fiction (2016); Center for Fiction First Novel Prize (2015); Carnegie Medal for Excellence in Fiction (2016); Asian/Pacific American Award for Literature for Adult Fiction (2015)
- ISBN: 978-0-8021-2345-9 (hardback)
- Dewey Decimal: 813.6
- LC Class: PS3614.G97 S96 2015
- Followed by: The Committed

The Sympathizer is the 2015 debut novel by Vietnamese-American professor and writer Viet Thanh Nguyen. It depicts the anonymous narrator, a North Vietnamese mole in the South Vietnamese army, who stays embedded in a South Vietnamese community in exile in the United States after the end of the Vietnam War. While in the United States, the narrator describes being an expatriate and a cultural advisor on the production of an American film, closely resembling Platoon and Apocalypse Now, before returning to Vietnam as part of a guerrilla raid against the communists.

The novel incorporates elements from a number of different novel genres: mystery, political, metafiction, dark comedic, historical, spy, and war. Thematically, it centres on the dual identity of the narrator, as a mole and immigrant, and the Americanization of the Vietnam War in international literature.

The Sympathizer was published 40 years to the month after the fall of Saigon, which is the initial setting of the book. It was well received by critics and became a bestseller, receiving numerous literary awards including the 2016 Pulitzer Prize for Fiction.

The novel was adapted as a television miniseries of the same name starring Hoa Xuande, which premiered on HBO in April 2024.

A sequel, titled The Committed, was published on March 2, 2021. Nguyen has stated that The Sympathizer and The Committed are intended to be part of a trilogy.

== Plot ==
Set as the flashback in a coerced confession of a political prisoner, the narrator describes the South Vietnamese Government in 1975 and subsequent events in American exile in Los Angeles through the eyes of a half-Vietnamese, half-French undercover communist agent. The spy remains unnamed throughout the novel from the fall of Saigon, to refugee camps and relocation in Los Angeles, to his time as a film consultant in the Philippines, and finally to his return and subsequent imprisonment in Vietnam.

The narrator lives in a series of dualities, at times contradictions: he is of mixed blood descent (Vietnamese mother, and French Catholic priest father), raised in Vietnam but attended college in the U.S., and a North Vietnamese mole yet a friend to South Vietnamese military officials and soldiers and a United States CIA agent. When the narrator is fourteen, he swears a blood oath with his friends Bon and Man, cutting their palms and becoming blood brothers. During the imminent fall of Saigon, he, as an aide-de-camp, arranges for a last minute flight as part of Operation Frequent Wind, to secure the safety of himself, his best friend Bon, and the General he advises. While they are being evacuated, the group is fired upon while boarding; during the escape, Bon's wife and child are killed along with many others.

In Los Angeles, the General and his former officers become disillusioned by a foreign culture and their rapid decline in status. The General attempts to reclaim some semblance of honor by opening his own business, a liquor store. The continuous emasculation and dehumanization within American society prompts the General to draft plans for assembling an army of South Vietnamese expatriates to return as rebels to Vietnam. While participating in the expatriate unit, the narrator takes a clerical position at Occidental College, begins having an affair with Ms. Mori, his Japanese-American colleague, and then the General's eldest daughter, Lana. While living in the United States, the narrator sends letters to Man, a North Vietnamese revolutionary and handler, providing intelligence about the General's attempts at raising a commando army. In order to mislead the General's suspicions of a mole among the South Vietnamese immigrants, the narrator frames another military officer nicknamed by the narrator as "the crapulent major". The General orders his murder which Bon and the narrator carry out.

When he receives an offer to consult for a Hollywood film on the Vietnam War called The Hamlet, he sees it as an opportunity to give the Vietnamese a voice in their historical portrayal. However, working on set in the Philippines, he not only fails to complicate the misleading, romantically American representation of the war, but almost dies when explosives detonate before they should. He is skeptical as to whether this is a mistake, as the director greatly dislikes him.

After he recovers, against Man's insistence that he stay in the U.S., the narrator decides to accompany the exiled troops back into Vietnam. Before he returns, he shoots and kills a left-leaning Vietnamese newspaper editor, Sonny, who he learns had an affair with Ms. Mori while the narrator was in the Philippines. During his mission in Vietnam, he saves Bon's life before they are captured by the revolutionaries and imprisoned in an re-education camp.

During his captivity, the narrator writes his confession, addressed to the camp commandant who is directed by the commissar. The confession is a complex and nuanced reflection of the events that have led him to his imprisonment, sympathizing with the many perspectives of the war. While he still considers himself a communist and revolutionary, he acknowledges his friendships with those who are supposedly his enemy and he understands all soldiers as honorably fighting for their home. After his confession drafts are repeatedly rejected, he is finally brought before the commissar.

The commissar, known as "the faceless man" due to his severe napalm burns, turns out to be his direct superior Man. However, this does not stop Man from subjecting him to torture as part of his re-education. First, the narrator must admit his crime of being complicit in the torturing and raping of a female communist agent. Then he must realize that he took part, albeit unconsciously, in the murder of his father. Lastly, he must learn Man's final lesson that a revolution fought for independence and freedom could make those things worth less than nothing, that nothingness itself was more precious than independence and freedom. The novel ends with the narrator on crowded boat of refugees at sea as part of the massive maritime exodus from Vietnam that began in 1975.

== Characters ==
- The narrator: a half-Vietnamese half-French man who is an undercover communist agent in the South Vietnamese army
- Bon: a militant anticommunist soldier for the South Vietnamese army
- Man: a North Vietnamese revolutionary who later becomes the Commissar of the re-education camp
- Claude: a CIA agent who trained the narrator and other South Vietnamese intelligence officers
- The General: the former South Vietnamese general who flees Vietnam with his family to live in the United States
- The Department Chair: an old Orientalist professor who the narrator works for at Occidental College
- Sofia Mori: the Japanese-American secretary of the Department Chair
- Lana: the General's daughter, a fun-loving, independent young university student
- The Auteur: a famed Western film director who directs The Hamlet

== Style ==
Almost every review comments on the most distinctive stylistic feature: the anonymous narrator who provides continuous commentary. The narrator has an "acrobatic ability" that guides the reader through the contradictions of the war and American identity. The first person narration derives from the frame context for the book: a confession by the narrator to communist captors trying to make him account for his exile. The communist captors force him to write and rewrite the narrative, in an attempt to correct his ideological lens on America and the South Vietnamese enemies.

Many critiques compare the narrator's style to other authors, typically American authors. Randy Boyagoda, writing for The Guardian, describes the initial passage of the novel as a "showy riff on Ralph Ellison's Invisible Man". For Boyagoda, the anonymity and doubled life reflection of the narrator closely parallel the African American narrator of Invisible Man's commentary from the perspective of concealment. Ron Charles describes the narrative voice as close to both "Roth-inspired comic scene[s] of self-abuse" and "gorgeous Whitmanian catalogue of suffering".

== Themes ==
Most reviews of the novel describe it as a literary response to the typically American-centric worldview of the Vietnam War in works like Apocalypse Now and Platoon. In particular, the section of the novel where the narrator advises on The Hamlet helps critically examine this worldview. Ron Charles describes this section as "As funny as it is tragic", able to "carry the whole novel". The New York Times' book review describes the war as a "literary war", and says that Nguyen's The Sympathizer is "giving voice to the previously voiceless [Vietnamese perspective] while it compels the rest of us to look at the events of 40 years ago in a new light". In part, the novel is a response to Nguyen's own admiration of, but difficult relationship with, works like Platoon, Apocalypse Now, and Rambo and the slaughter of Vietnamese in the films.

The narrator's duality of race, caste, education, and loyalties drive much of the novels' activities. At first this duality is the strength of the novel's narrator, providing deft critique and investigation into the contradictions of social situations, but eventually, in the last, this duality "becomes an absurdist tour de force that might have been written by a Kafka or Genet".

== Reception ==
=== Critical response ===
The New York Times Book Review praised the novel for its place in the broader Vietnam War literature, and for its treatment of dualities in a way that "compares favorably with masters like Conrad, Greene and le Carré". Writing for The Washington Post, Ron Charles called the novel "surely a new classic of war fiction" which is "startlingly insightful and perilously candid". For Charles, it is less the particulars of the thematic explosion of the response to the Vietnam war that makes the novel relevant, but rather how "Nguyen plumbs the loneliness of human life, the costs of fraternity and the tragic limits of our sympathy". Randy Boyagoda, writing for The Guardian, describes it as a "bold, artful and globally minded reimagining of the Vietnam war and its interwoven private and public legacies".

One of the critiques from reviewers is, at times, the overwritten description in the novel. Though generally supportive of the novel, Boyagoda criticizes it for being explicit and heavy-handed, and argues that the Captain's speeches against east/west stereotypes, the US, and Catholicism become repetitive and rely on familiar clichés rather than fresh insight. He also suggests that the author's academic background makes part of the narration feel more like a lecture.

Several commentators said the book offered a new perspective on the Vietnam War, one that differs from the one provided by Hollywood filmmakers. In contrast, historian Peter Zinoman indicates that the novel closely and repeatedly aligns with the views of the 'orthodox' historiographical school, that is, a portrayal of the Republic of Vietnam as allegiance to foreign influence, corruption, military violence against civilians, the demeaning of Vietnamese women, and its depiction of sexual violence, as in many Hollywood Vietnam films; all of these notions have been challenged by recent scholarship.

=== Accolades ===
Organizations (Note: Awards, festivals, honors and other miscellaneous organizations are listed in alphabetical order.)	Year (Note: Indicates the year of ceremony.)	Category	Result	Ref.
American Booksellers Association	2016	Indies Choice Book Awards	Honored	
American Library Association	2016	Andrew Carnegie Medals	Won	
Asian Pacific American Librarians Association	2016	Adult Fiction	Won	
Association for Asian American Studies	2017	Book Awards for Creative Writing: Prose	Won	
California Book Awards	2016	Gold Medal in First Fiction	Won	
Dayton Literary Peace Prize	2016	Fiction	Won	
Deutscher Krimi Preis	2017	International	Runner-up	
Dublin City Libraries	2017	International Dublin Literary Award	Finalist (Note: This is also the final list before announcing the winners.)	
Edgar Awards	2016	Best First Novel	Won	
Los Angeles Times Book Prize	2016	Mystery/Thriller	Finalist	
PEN America	2016	PEN/Robert W. Bingham Prize	Finalist	
PEN/Faulkner Foundation	2016	PEN/Faulkner Award for Fiction	Finalist	
Prix du Meilleur Livre Étranger	2017	Novel	Won	
Pulitzer Prize	2016	Fiction	Won	
The Center for Fiction	2015	First Novel Prize	Won	

== Book lists ==
The Sympathizer was selected for more than 30 best-of-the-year lists, including The New York Times, The Wall Street Journal, The Washington Post, The Guardian, and The Globe and Mail. It was on Time magazine's list of "The 100 Best Mystery and Thriller Books of All Time", Vulture's list of "A Premature Attempt at the 21st Century Canon" and was named one of the best books of the 2010s decade by Esquire, Insider, Literary Hub, and Paste. Pasadena Public Library featured the book in its "One City, One Story" program in 2017. Additionally, Los Angeles Times also selected The Sympathizer as one of the most essential L.A. literary novels.

=== Year-End Lists ===
Publisher	Year	Category	Ref.
Amazon	2015	Best Books of the Year – Top 20	
Amazon	2015	2015 Best Books of the Year: Literature & Fiction	
American Library Association	2016	2016 Notable Books List	
Berkeleyside	2016	Best Books of 2016	
Bloomberg	2016	The Best Books of 2016	
Booklist	2015	Editors' Choice: Adult Books, 2015	
BuzzFeed	2015	The 24 Best Fiction Books Of 2015	
BuzzFeed	2015	The 24 Best Literary Debuts Of 2015	
Chicago Public Library	2015	Best Books of 2015: Fiction	
City Club of Cleveland	2015	Best Books of 2015	
East Bay Express	2015	Best Fiction of 2015	
Entropy	2015	Best Fiction Books of 2015	
Flavorwire	2015	The 50 Best Independent Press Books of 2015	
Gates Notes	2017	5 Amazing Books I Read This Year	
Kirkus Reviews	2015	Best Debut Fiction of 2015	
Kirkus Reviews	2015	Best Fiction Books of 2015	
Kirkus Reviews	2015	Best Historical Fiction of 2015	
Le Point	2017	25 Books of the Year	
Library Journal	2015	Best Books 2015: Top Ten	
Literary Hub	2015	The 25 Best Books of the Year	
Los Angeles Public Library	2015	Best of 2015: Fiction	
Minnesota Public Radio	2015	Top Fiction Picks of 2015	
National Post	2015	The NP99: The Best Books of 2015	
Orlando Weekly	2015	Top 10 Books of 2015	
Politics and Prose	2015	2015 Holiday Newsletter – Fiction Favorites	
PopMatters	2015	A Short List of Great 2015 Books	
Powell's Books	2016	Staff Top Fives 2016	
Publishers Weekly	2015	Best Books of 2015 – Fiction	
Quartz	2015	Best Books of 2015	
Slate	2015	Laura Miller's 10 Favorite Books of 2015	
Smithsonian Asian Pacific American Center	2015	Top 25 APA Book Picks for 2015	
The Daily Beast	2015	The Best Fiction of 2015	
The Georgia Straight	2015	This Year's Outstanding Books	
The Globe and Mail	2015	Globe 100: Best Books of 2015	
The Guardian	2015	Best Books of 2015	
The Guardian	2016	The Best Fiction of 2016	
The Irish Times	2016	The Best Crime Fiction of 2016	
The Kansas City Star	2015	Best Fiction of 2015	
The New York Times	2015	100 Notable Books of 2015	
The Seattle Times	2015	Best Books of 2015	
The Wall Street Journal	2015	Best Books of 2015	
The Washington Post	2015	Notable Fiction Books of 2015	

=== Decade/Century Book Lists ===
Publisher	Year	Category	Ref.
Esquire	2019	The Best Books of the 2010s	
Insider	2019	101 Books From the 2010s That You Need to Read	
Literary Hub	2019	Best of the Decade	
Literary Hub	2019	The 20 Best Novels of the Decade	
Literary Hub	2019	The 10 Best Debut Novels of the Decade	
Literary Hub	2019	100 Books That Defined the Decade	
Parade	2022	222 Best Books of All Time	
Paste	2019	The 40 Best Novels of the 2010s	
Penguin Books	2020	The Greatest Spy Thrillers in Literature	
Powell's Books	2018	25 Books to Read Before You Die: 21st Century	
Rising Kashmir	2022	Ten Best Spy Novels of All Time	
Southern Living	2023	50 Books From The Past 50 Years	
The New York Times	2024	100 Best Books of the 21st Century	
Time	2023	The 100 Best Mystery and Thriller Books of All Time	
Vulture	2018	A Premature Attempt at the 21st Century Canon	

=== Miscellaneous ===
Publisher	Year	Category	Ref.
Los Angeles Times	2023	The Ultimate L.A. Bookshelf: Fiction	
Pasadena Public Library	2017	One City, One Story	

== Adaptation ==
In April 2021, A24 and Rhombus Media acquired the rights to the novel to adapt it as a television series. In July 2021, it was announced that HBO had given the production a series order. The series would be produced by A24 with Robert Downey Jr. as co-star and executive producer, Park Chan-wook as director and Don McKellar as co-showrunner. In November 2022, Hoa Xuande, Fred Nguyen Khan, Toan Le, Vy Le, Alan Trong, Sandra Oh, Kiều Chinh, Nguyễn Cao Kỳ Duyên joined the cast. In January 2023, it was announced that Marc Munden and Fernando Meirelles would direct several episodes of the series and also that Duy Nguyen, Kayli Tran and VyVy Nguyen were added to the cast.

The series premiered on HBO's streaming service Max on April 14, 2024.

== See also ==
- Phạm Xuân Ẩn
