= Hoa Xuande =

Australian actor

- Born: Hoa Xuan Nguyen; Sydney, Australia
- Education: Trinity Grammar
- Alma mater: Western Australian Academy of Performing Arts
- Occupation: Actor
- Years active: 2010–present

Hoa Xuan Nguyen, known professionally as Hoa Xuande (/hoʊˈɑː ʃɔːnˈdeɪ/), is an Australian actor of Vietnamese descent. He is best known for his role as Lin in the 2021 live action remake of Cowboy Bebop and as the Captain in the 2024 HBO television series The Sympathizer.

== Early life and education ==
Xuande is of Vietnamese descent. He studied acting at Western Australian Academy of Performing Arts. Xuande attended school at Trinity Grammar in Melbourne.

== Career ==
In his early career, Xuande appeared in productions in Australia. From 2016 to 2017, Xuande portrayed Elvin in the Australian ABC comedy series Ronny Chieng: International Student, alongside Ronny Chieng, Molly Daniels, Shuang Hu, Patch May and Anthony Morgan.

In 2020 he portrayed Khoa in the SBS series Hungry Ghosts. He portrayed Lin in the 2021 live action remake of Cowboy Bebop.

In 2022, Xuande was announced as the lead, the Captain, in the 2024 HBO historical black comedy drama television series The Sympathizer. The miniseries is an adaptation of the 2015 novel of the same name written by American Viet Thanh Nguyen. The series premiered on HBO in April 2024. For his performance as the Captain, Xuande was nominated for the Independent Spirit Award for Best Breakthrough Performance in a New Scripted Series, the Gotham Award for Outstanding Performance in a Limited Series and the Satellite Award for Best Actor – Miniseries or Television Film.

== Filmography ==
=== Film ===
Year	Title	Role
2017	OtherLife	Coder #1
2022	A Stitch in Time	Hamish
TBA	Untitled Mike Thornton biopic film †	TBA

=== Television ===
Year	Title	Role	Notes
2016–2017	Ronny Chieng: International Student	Elvin	Main cast (4 episodes)
2017	Top of the Lake: China Girl	Walker	1 episode
2017	Cleverman	Advisor #1	1 episode
2020	Hungry Ghosts	Khoa	4 episodes
2021	Cowboy Bebop	Lin	7 episodes
2023	Last King of the Cross	Romeo	7 episodes
2024	The Sympathizer	The Captain	Lead role
2026	Avatar: The Last Airbender	Professor Zei	3 episodes
