= Viet Thanh Nguyen =

South Vietnamese-born American writer (born 1971)

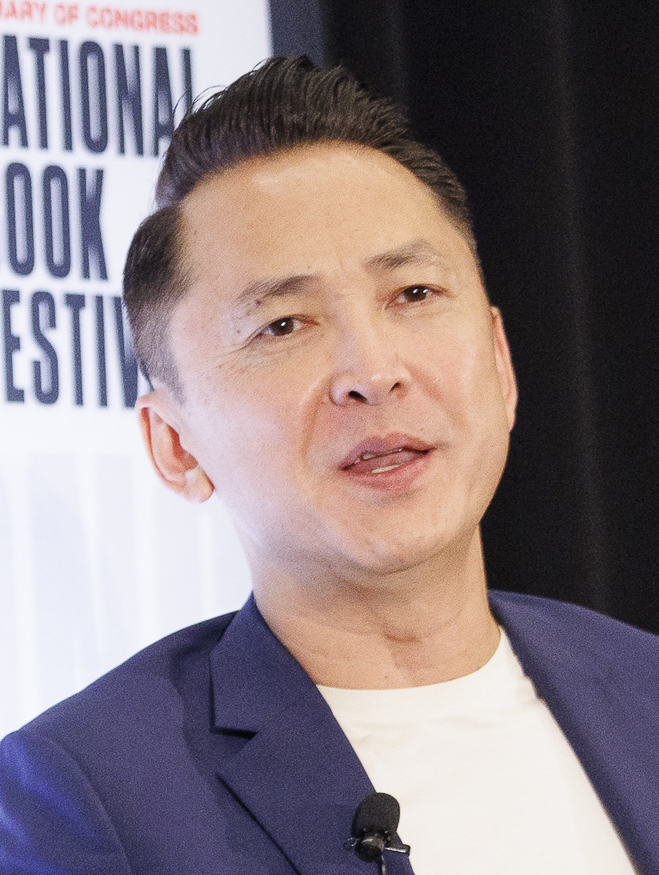
- Viet in 2024
- Born: Nguyễn Thanh Việt; March 13, 1971 (age 55); Ban Mê Thuột, South Vietnam
- Education: Bellarmine College Preparatory (HS Diploma); UC Berkeley (BA, PhD); UCLA; UC Riverside
- Occupations: Professor; Fiction writer
- Spouse: Lan Duong
- Children: 2
- Writing career
- Genres: Novel, literary fiction, historical fiction, crime fiction, non-fiction
- Notable works: The Sympathizer (2015); The Refugees (2017)
- Notable awards: Pulitzer Prize for Fiction (2016); MacArthur Genius Grant (2017); Guggenheim Fellowship (2017)
- Website: vietnguyen.info

Viet Thanh Nguyen (Vietnamese: Nguyễn Thanh Việt; born March 13, 1971 (Note: Nguyen said his actual date of birth was February 13, 1971, due to a mistake during the information declaration process while at the refugee camp. This article refers to Nguyen's legal date of birth in the United States.)) is a South Vietnamese-born American professor and novelist. He is the Aerol Arnold Chair of English and Professor of English and American Studies and Ethnicity at the University of Southern California.

Nguyen's debut novel, The Sympathizer, won the 2016 Pulitzer Prize for Fiction, the Dayton Literary Peace Prize, the Center for Fiction First Novel Prize, and many other accolades. In 2017, he was awarded a MacArthur Foundation Fellowship and a Guggenheim Fellowship.

Nguyen is a regular contributor to and op-ed columnist for The New York Times, covering immigration, refugees, politics, culture, and Southeast Asia. He is a fellow of the American Academy of Arts and Sciences, and in 2020 was elected the first Asian American member of the Pulitzer Prize Board in its 103-year-history. In the teaching field, in 2023, Nguyen is also the first Asian American to headline the Charles Eliot Norton Lecture Series at Harvard University.

== Early life and education ==
Nguyễn was born in Ban Mê Thuột, South Vietnam, in 1971. He is the son of Linda Thanh Nguyen and Joseph Thanh Nguyen, people of Nghĩa Yên village, Đức Thọ district, Hà Tĩnh province. They are refugees from North Vietnam who had moved south in 1954. Nguyen's mother's real name is Nguyễn Thị Bảy and she is a highly influential person in his life. In an excerpt from his book A Man of Two Faces: A Memoir, A History, A Memorial, he writes: "People like Má (Note: Ba and má are Vietnamese words for 'father' and 'mother', respectively, in English. Nguyen calls his parents by these words.) who will not be remembered by History are also a part of History, drafted as reluctant players in horrific wars... Unlike soldiers, these civilians, many of them women and children, never get the recognition they deserve. Some endure more terror, see more horror, than some soldiers."

After the fall of Saigon in 1975, his family fled to the United States. They left behind his 16-year-old adopted sister, whom he did not see again for nearly 30 years. His family first settled in Fort Indiantown Gap, one of four American camps that accommodated refugees from Vietnam, then moved to Harrisburg, Pennsylvania, until 1978. San Jose, California, was the Nguyen family's next destination, where his parents opened a Vietnamese grocery store called SàiGòn Mới, one of the first of its kind in the area. On Christmas Eve, when Nguyen was nine years old, his parents survived being shot during a robbery at their store. When he was 16, a gunman broke into the family's house and threatened them. His mother ran into the street screaming for help and saved everyone's lives.

Seven years after arriving in America, Viet's older brother, Tung Thanh Nguyen (Vietnamese: Nguyễn Thanh Tùng), whom he calls "the original refugee success story", entered Harvard University. Tung graduated four years later with a B.A. degree in philosophy, and earned an M.D. in 1991 from Stanford University. Tung is the Stephen J. McPhee, MD Endowed Chair in General Internal Medicine and Professor of Medicine at the University of California, San Francisco. He also served as a Commissioner on President Barack Obama’s Advisory Commission on Asian Americans and Pacific Islanders (2011–14) and as the Chair of the commission (2014–17).

As a child, Nguyễn often enjoyed reading literature about the Vietnam War, preferably those from the Vietnamese perspectives, which were rather rare at the time in comparison with the overwhelming amount of American narratives. While growing up in San Jose, he attended St. Patrick School, a Catholic elementary school, and Bellarmine College Preparatory.

Nguyen attended the University of California, Riverside for a year and UCLA for a quarter before finishing his studies at the University of California, Berkeley. He graduated Phi Beta Kappa in 1992 with a B.A. in English and Ethnic Studies. At the age of 26, he earned a PhD in English from Berkeley in 1997.

== Teaching career ==
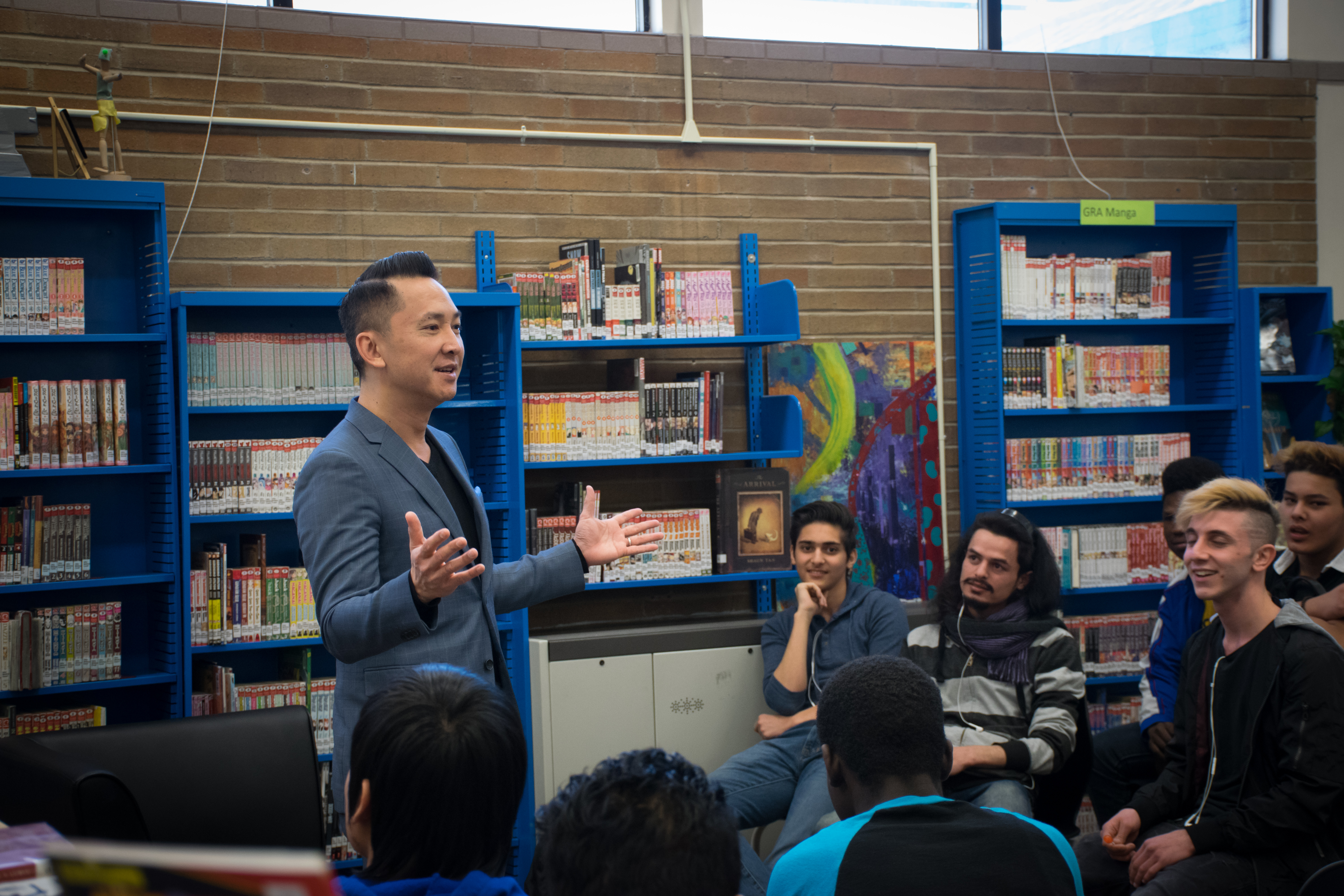
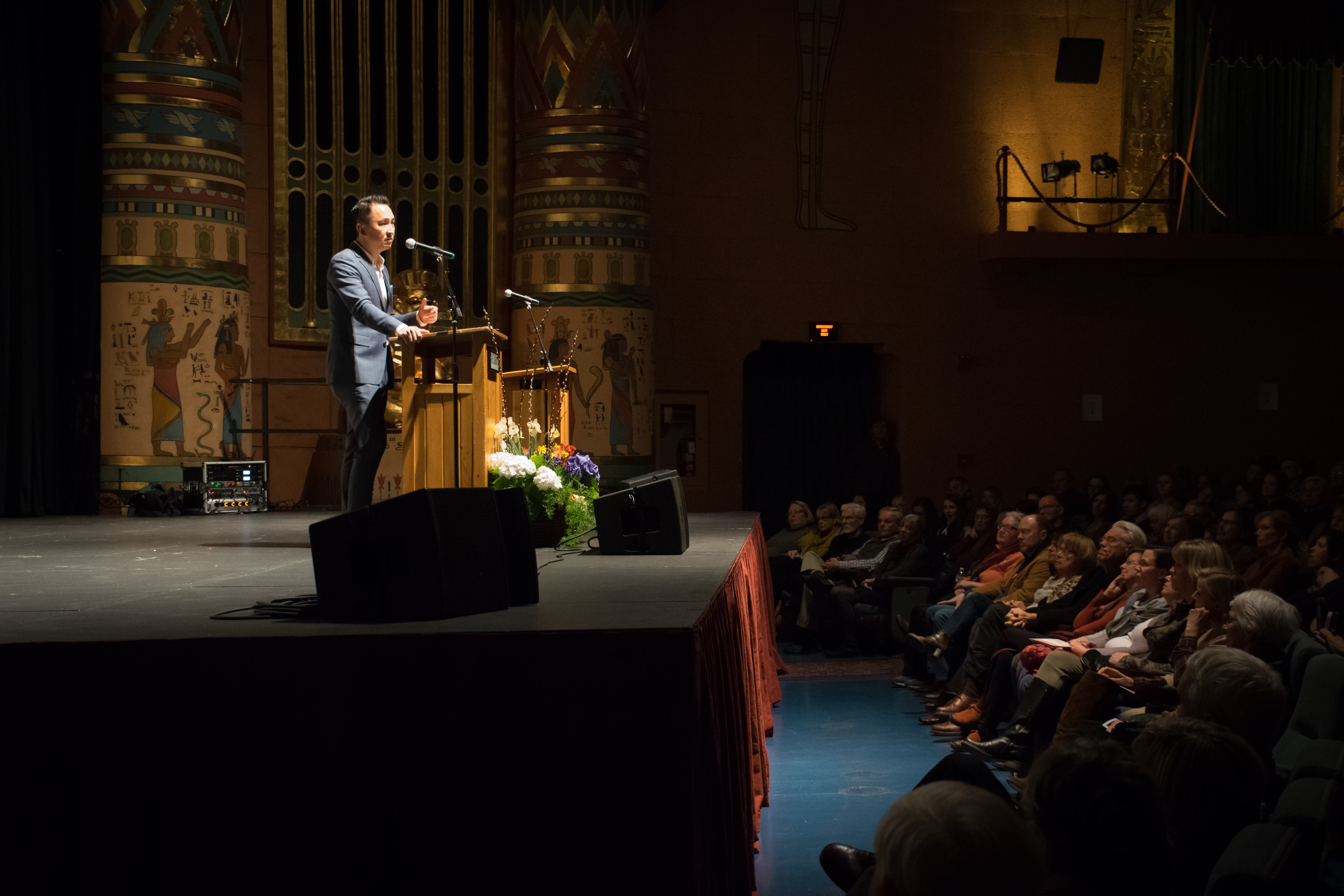
Nguyen spoke at Borah High School (above) and The Egyptian Theatre (below) in 2018.

In 1997, Nguyen moved to Los Angeles for a teaching position as an assistant professor at the University of Southern California in both the English Department, and in the American Studies and Ethnicity Department. In 2003, he became an associate professor in the two departments. He is currently a University Professor and the Aerol Arnold Chair of English and Professor of English, American Studies and Ethnicity and Comparative Literature.

Nguyen was appointed the 2023 Charles Eliot Norton Professor of Poetry at Harvard University and presented a series of six lectures titled To Save and to Destroy. His series is the first to be given in person on Harvard's campus since 2018. Nguyen is also the first Asian American to lead the Charles Eliot Norton Lecture Series, alongside other writers such as Jorge Luis Borges, T. S. Eliot, and Toni Morrison.

In addition to teaching and writing, Nguyen serves as cultural critic-at-large for the Los Angeles Times, he is also the founder and editor of diaCRITICS, a blog for the Diasporic Vietnamese Artists Network.

== Writing ==
=== Novels ===
Nguyen's debut novel, The Sympathizer was published in 2015 by Grove Press/Atlantic. The Sympathizer won the 2016 Pulitzer Prize for Fiction. The Sympathizer additionally won the Center for Fiction First Novel Prize, the Carnegie Medal for Excellence in Fiction from the American Library Association, and the Asian/Pacific American Award for Literature in Fiction from the Asian/Pacific American Librarians Association. The book additionally won the Edgar Award for Best First Novel from an American Author from the Mystery Writers of America, and was a finalist in the PEN/Faulkner Award for Fiction, and the PEN/Robert W. Bingham Prize for Debut Fiction. The novel has also won the Dayton Literary Peace Prize. The New York Times included The Sympathizer among the Book Review's "Editors' Choice" selection of new books when the book debuted, and in its list of "Notable Books of 2015". The novel also made it onto numerous other "Books of the Year" lists, including those of The Guardian, The Wall Street Journal, and The Washington Post. It was also a New York Times Best Seller.

Nguyen's second novel, The Committed, which continues the story of The Sympathizer, was published in 2021.

=== Short stories ===
Nguyen's short fiction has been published in Best New American Voices 2007 ("A Correct Life"), Manoa ("Better Homes and Gardens"), Narrative Magazine ("Someone Else Besides You", "Arthur Arellano", and "Fatherland", which was a prize winner in the 2011 Winter Fiction Contest), TriQuarterly ("The War Years" - Issue 135/136), The Good Men Project ("Look At Me"), the Chicago Tribune ("The Americans", also a 2010 Nelson Algren Short Story Awards finalist), and Gulf Coast, where his story won the 2007 Fiction Prize.

In May 2008, Nguyen was one of the contributing authors of A Stranger Among Us: Stories of Cross-Cultural Collision and Connection published by OV Books, Other Voices, Inc. In February 2017, Nguyen continued to collaborate with Grove Press to publish a book of short stories entitled The Refugees.

=== Non-fiction ===
Nguyen is the editor of The Displaced: Refugee Writers on Refugee Lives, which includes essays by 17 fellow refugee writers from Mexico, Bosnia, Iran, Afghanistan, Hungary, Chile, and Ethiopia, among other countries.

Nguyen has also released a non-fiction book published by the Harvard University Press in March 2016 entitled Nothing Ever Dies: Vietnam and the Memory of War, which served as a critical bookend to a creative project whose fictional bookend was The Sympathizer. According to his website, the book Nothing Ever Dies "examines how the so-called Vietnam War has been remembered by many countries and people, from the US to Vietnam, Laos, Cambodia, and South Korea." Kirkus Reviews has also called the book "a powerful reflection on how we choose to remember and forget." The book is a National Book Award finalist.

In 2002, Nguyen published a treatise entitled Race and Resistance: Literature and Politics in Asian America. Nguyen has also co-edited a treatise entitled Transpacific Studies: Framing an Emerging Field along with Janet Hoskins in 2014.

Nguyen's non-fiction articles and essays have appeared in journals and books, including PMLA, American Literary History, Western American Literature, positions: east asia cultures critique, The New Centennial Review, Postmodern Culture, The Japanese Journal of American Studies, and Asian American Studies After Critical Mass. In an opinion column in the New York Times, Nguyen discussed having been a refugee and characterized refugees as heroic.

=== Children's books ===
Nguyen and illustrator Thi Bui, along with their respective children, collaborated on a children's book titled Chicken of the Sea.

== Personal life ==
In 2016, Nguyen spoke out for Palestinian rights by supporting the Boycott, Divestment and Sanctions movement. In 2023, after Nguyen signed an open letter in the London Review of Books urging "an end to violence and destruction in Palestine," a Jewish organization at the 92nd Street Y canceled a scheduled reading by Nguyen without explanation. After the cancellation, other authors pulled out of the centre's upcoming programming schedule, and at least two 92NY employees resigned. On Instagram, Nguyen wrote: "I have no regrets about anything I have said or done in regards to Palestine, Israel, or the occupation and war". During the Gaza war, he supported a boycott of Israeli cultural institutions, including publishers and literary festivals.

Nguyen is married to Lan Duong, a faculty member in cinema and media studies at USC and a poet, who also grew up in San Jose after coming to the United States as a young refugee. They have two children and live in Pasadena, California.

== Bibliography ==
Type	Title	Year	Publisher	Identifier	Ref.
Children's book	Chicken of the Sea (with illustrator Thi Bui)	2019	McSweeney's Publishing	Hardcover: ISBN 978-1-944211-73-8	
Children's book	Simone (with illustrator Minnie Phan)	2024	Astra Publishing House	Hardcover: ISBN 978-1-66265-119-9	
Essays	To Save and to Destroy	2025	Belknap Press	Hardcover: ISBN 978-0-674-29817-0	
Novels	The Sympathizer	2015	Grove Press	Paperback: ISBN 978-0-8021-2494-4; Hardcover: ISBN 978-0-8021-2345-9	
Novels	The Committed	2021	Grove Press	Paperback: ISBN 978-0-8021-5707-2; Hardcover: ISBN 978-0-8021-5706-5	
Non-fiction	Race and Resistance: Literature and Politics in Asian America	2002	Oxford University Press	Paperback: ISBN 978-0-19-514700-1; Hardcover: ISBN 978-0-19-514699-8	
Non-fiction	Transpacific Studies: Framing an Emerging Field	2014	University of Hawaiʻi Press	Paperback: ISBN 978-0-8248-3998-7; Hardcover: ISBN 978-0-8248-3994-9	
Non-fiction	Nothing Ever Dies: Vietnam and The Memory of War	2016	Harvard University Press	Paperback: ISBN 978-0-674-97984-0; Hardcover: ISBN 978-0-674-66034-2	
Non-fiction	The Displaced: Refugee Writers on Refugee Lives	2018	Abrams Books	Paperback: ISBN 978-1-4197-3511-0; Hardcover: ISBN 978-1-4197-2948-5	
Non-fiction	Maxine Hong Kingston: The Woman Warrior, China Men, Tripmaster Monkey, Other Writings	2022	Library of America	Hardcover: ISBN 978-1-59853-724-6	
Non-fiction	A Man of Two Faces: A Memoir, A History, A Memorial	2023	Grove Press	Paperback: ISBN 978-0-8021-6376-9; Hardcover: ISBN 978-0-8021-6050-8	
Short stories	Better Homes and Gardens	2002	University of Hawaiʻi Press	Paperback: ISBN 978-0-8248-2581-2	
Short stories	A Correct Life	2007	Harcourt	Paperback: ISBN 978-0-15-603155-4	
Short stories	The Other Woman	2007	University of Houston		
Short stories	Someone Else Besides You	2008	Narrative Magazine		
Short stories	Arthur Arellano	2010	Narrative Magazine		
Short stories	The War Years	2010	Northwestern University		
Short stories	The Americans	2010	Chicago Tribune		
Short stories	Look At Me	2011	The Good Men Project		
Short stories	Fatherland	2011	Narrative Magazine		
Short stories	Black-Eyed Women	2015	Cornell University	ASIN B01MTEKLVE (Reprinted)	
Short stories	The Refugees	2017	Grove Press	Paperback: ISBN 978-0-8021-2736-5; Hardcover: ISBN 978-0-8021-2639-9	

== Accolades ==
Nguyen has also been a fellow of the American Council of Learned Societies (2011–2012), the Radcliffe Institute for Advanced Study at Harvard (2008–2009), and the Fine Arts Work Center (2004–2005). He has also received residencies, fellowships, and grants from the Luce Foundation, the Mellon Foundation, the Asian Cultural Council, the Djerassi Artists Residency, the Bread Loaf Writers' Conference, the Huntington Library, the James Irvine Foundation, the Warhol Foundation and Creative Capital.

His teaching and service awards include the Albert S. Raubenheimer Distinguished Junior Faculty Award for outstanding research, teaching and service, the Mellon Mentoring Award for Faculty Mentoring Graduate Students, the Resident Faculty of the Year Award, and the General Education Teaching Award. Multimedia has also been a key part of his teaching: In a recent course on the American War in Vietnam, he and his students created An Other War Memorial, which won a grant from the Fund for Innovative Undergraduate Teaching and the USC Provost's Prize for Teaching With Technology.
