= Sex and Food: The Best of The Pursuit of Happiness =

Greatest hits album by The Pursuit of Happiness
- Released: 2000
- Genre: college rock
- Label: Razor & Tie

The Pursuit of Happiness chronology
The Wonderful World of The Pursuit of Happiness (1996)	Sex and Food: The Best of The Pursuit of Happiness (2000)	When We Ruled: The Best of The Pursuit of Happiness (2005)

Sex and Food: The Best of The Pursuit of Happiness is a greatest hits album by Canadian rock band The Pursuit of Happiness, released in 2000.

Professional ratings
Review scores
Source	Rating
Allmusic	link

== Track listing ==
All tracks are written by Moe Berg, except "Edmonton Block Heater" (lyrics by Michael Turner and music by Hugh Dillon and Swamp Baby).

No.	Title	Origin/Description	Length
1.	"I'm an Adult Now"	their breakthrough January 1990 single version, from 1988's Love Junk	4:29
2.	"Cigarette Dangles"	first single from The Downward Road, February 1993	2:33
3.	"Two Girls In One"	first single from One Sided Story, May 1990	2:32
4.	"Ten Fingers"	from Love Junk, 1988	2:52
5.	"She's So Young"	first single from Love Junk, January 1989	3:35
6.	"Pressing Lips"	second single from The Downward Road, May 1993	3:32
7.	"Kalendar"	third single from Where's the Bone, January 1996	1:55
8.	"Let My People Go"	B-side of the single for "She's So Young," January 1989	3:21
9.	"Hard to Laugh"	third single from Love Junk, July 1989	2:38
10.	"Nobody But Me"	from The Downward Road, 1993	3:19
11.	"She's The Devil"	first single from The Wonderful World of The Pursuit of Happiness, September 1996	2:05
12.	"Food - (live acoustic, featuring Moe Berg, Kris Abbott, Rachel Oldfield)"	from "Realtime" CBC radio show (January 1996) recording of the first track on 1990's One Sided Story	2:05
13.	"Wake Up and Smell Cathy"	1988 demo	2:51
14.	"Take You With Me"	from Love Junk sessions, 1988 (previously unreleased)	2:51
15.	"Walking in the Woods"	from Love Junk, 1988	3:52
16.	"Consciousness Raising as a Social Tool"	from Love Junk, 1988	2:30
17.	"Edmonton Block Heater (live)"	recorded at Horseshoe Tavern, Toronto, 1997	2:12
18.	"All I Want"	from One Sided Story, 1990	4:46
