= The Greatest Fits =

Compilation album by Headstones
- Released: October 23, 2001
- Recorded: at Cherry Beach Sound; Toronto, Ontario
- Genre: Alternative rock, hard rock
- Label: Universal
- Producer: Colin Cripps

Headstones chronology
Nickels for Your Nightmares (2000)	The Greatest Fits (2001)	The Oracle of Hi-Fi (2002)

The Greatest Fits is the 2001 greatest hits album by Canadian rock band, Headstones. The compilation features two new tracks, "Blowtorch" and "Come On". "Come On" was used as the theme for the Canadian sketch show Comedy Inc..

== Track listing ==
No.	Title	Length
1.	"Blowtorch" (Previously unreleased)	3:09
2.	"Come On" (Previously unreleased)	2:51
3.	"Smile & Wave" (From the album Smile and Wave, 1997)	4:06
4.	"Cubically Contained" (From the album Smile and Wave, 1997)	4:35
5.	"Unsound" (From the album Teeth and Tissue, 1995)	3:32
6.	"Three Angels" (From the album Picture of Health, 1993)	4:04
7.	"Settle" (From the album Nickels for Your Nightmares, 2000)	4:03
8.	"Tweeter And The Monkey Man" (From the album Picture of Health, 1993)	3:39
9.	"When Something Stands for Nothing" (From the album Picture of Health, 1993)	3:37
10.	"And" (From the album Smile and Wave, 1997)	4:04
11.	"It’s All Over" (From the album Picture of Health, 1993)	3:06
12.	"Hearts, Love and Honour" (From the album Teeth and Tissue, 1995)	4:49
13.	"Blonde & Blue" (From the album Nickels for Your Nightmares, 2000)	3:47
14.	"Cemetery" (From the album Picture of Health, 1993)	3:02
