= When We Ruled: The Best of The Pursuit of Happiness =

Greatest hits album by The Pursuit of Happiness
- Released: 22 November 2005
- Recorded: 1985–2005
- Genre: college rock
- Label: EMI Canada – 09463 38210 2
- Producer: Various

The Pursuit of Happiness chronology
Sex and Food: The Best of The Pursuit of Happiness (2000)	When We Ruled: The Best of The Pursuit of Happiness (2005)	Love Junk (Deluxe) (2018)

When We Ruled: The Best of The Pursuit of Happiness is a greatest hits album by Canadian college rock band The Pursuit of Happiness, released by Capitol Records/EMI Music Canada in 2005. It is the band's second hits compilation, following 2000's Sex and Food: The Best of The Pursuit of Happiness.

It included two newly recorded songs – "Hey Mary Anne" and a cover of Prince's "When Doves Cry" – and both the original single and Love Junk versions of the band's biggest hit, "I'm an Adult Now."

The album's first single, a cover of Prince's "When Doves Cry" was serviced to Canadian radio stations on 10 October 2005.

== Track listing ==
1. "I'm An Adult Now" (1988 Love Junk version)
2. "When Doves Cry"
3. "Hey Mary Anne"
4. "She's So Young"
5. "Killed By Love"
6. "Hard to Laugh"
7. "Two Girls In One"
8. "New Language"
9. "Ten Fingers"
10. "Consciousness Raising As a Social Tool"
11. "Down on Him"
12. "Beautiful White"
13. "Let My People Go" (B-side from Love Junk-era)
14. "Take You with Me" (outtake from Love Junk-era)
15. "Cigarette Dangles"
16. "Pressing Lips"
17. "Kalendar"
18. "Young and In Love"
19. "Gretzky Rocks"
20. "She's the Devil"
21. "I'm An Adult Now" (Original 1986 Version)

Tracks 1, 4–6, 9–12 from 1988's Love Junk album
Tracks 2 & 3 recorded in 2005 for this compilation
Tracks 7 & 8 from 1990's One Sided Story album
Tracks 15 & 16 from 1993's The Downward Road album
Tracks 17, 18 & 19 from 1995's Where's the Bone album
Track 20 from 1996's The Wonderful World of The Pursuit of Happiness album
