= A Tribute to Hard Core Logo =

Compilation album by Various artists
- Released: 1996-10-23

Bruce McDonald film soundtracks chronology
Dance Me Outside (1994)	A Tribute to Hard Core Logo (1996)	Hard Core Logo (1998)

A Tribute to Hard Core Logo is a 1996 album, which was released as an unofficial soundtrack to Bruce McDonald's film Hard Core Logo.

The film is a mockumentary about the reunion tour of a Canadian punk rock band, Hard Core Logo. Instead of releasing a conventional soundtrack, McDonald compiled a tribute album, asking a number of notable Canadian and international bands to record cover versions of the film's songs. The album was packaged with the participating musicians contributing quotes about Hard Core Logo's "influence" on their own music.

As part of the promotion for the album and film, McDonald placed classified ads in many Canadian publications, purporting to be from fans looking to buy Hard Core Logo memorabilia. Some real fans actually looking to purchase real promotional materials, such as movie posters or rare vinyl copies of the album, were forced to append comments in their advertisements to clarify that their ads were real.

The music video for "Blue Tattoo" by The Super Friendz appears on the Canadian VHS of the film.

A true soundtrack album, Hard Core Logo, was subsequently released in 1998 featuring the original songs as performed by Hugh Dillon with the band Swamp Baby.

== Critical response ==
Tom Harrison of The Province gave the album a 4/5 rating, saying in his review that the album "imaginatively mates the concept of the tribute album with that of the exploitative rock soundtrack", and said that it provides "enough grist to make you wish you could have seen Hard Core Logo at its peak -- if there'd been one." Chris Dafoe of The Globe and Mail rated the album three stars, writing that "the results are loose and funny and catchy and the liner notes ("They were ugly. I was ugly. They gave me hope," writes Moe Berg of The Pursuit of Happiness) offer proof that you can't survive long in the Canadian music industry without a sense of humour." James Muretich of the Calgary Herald rated it four out of five, and called it "a dose of rock solid reality that captures the sounds of underground bands during the '80s in Western Canada".

Shawn Ohler of the Edmonton Journal, conversely, rated the album just one and a half stars out of five, calling the album "as ill-conceived as it gets" and suggesting that The Pursuit of Happiness's version of "Edmonton Block Heater" was the album's only worthy song.

== Track listing ==
All lyrics by Michael Turner, music by the credited bands.

1. The Headstones, "Son of a Bitch to the Core"
2. The Pursuit of Happiness, "Edmonton Block Heater"
3. Rusty, "Let's Break Robert Out of Jail"
4. Dream Warriors, "Edmonton Block Heater"
5. Fishbone, "Words and Music"
6. The Super Friendz, "Blue Tattoo"
7. The Lugen Brothers, "Son of a Bitch to the Core"
8. 54-40, "Rock and Roll is Fat and Ugly"
9. Sol, "Blue Tattoo"
10. Doughboys, "Something's Gonna Die Tonight"
11. Chris Spedding, "China White"
12. Kinnie Starr, "Canadian Bush Party"
13. Odds, "Pipefitter's Clubhouse"
14. cub, "Who the Hell Do You Think You Are?"
15. Son, "Blue Tattoo"
