= Kathleen Munroe =

Canadian actress

- Born: Kathleen Marie Sammon Munroe; April 9, 1982 (age 44); Hamilton, Ontario, Canada
- Occupation: Actress
- Years active: 2001–present

Kathleen Munroe (born April 9, 1982) is a Canadian actress.

Munroe was born in Hamilton, Ontario, and currently resides in Los Angeles. She attended high school at Westdale Secondary School in Hamilton, and studied cinema at the University of Toronto. She won the 2010 ACTRA Award for Outstanding Female Performance. Munroe writes and plays music. She speaks fluent English and French.

Munroe identifies as queer.

== Filmography ==
=== Film ===
Year	Title	Role	Notes
2002	Drummer Boy	Lexus	
2004	Eternal	Connie	
2005	The White Dog Sacrifice	Kim	
2005	Ice Age Columbus	Zia	Docufilm
2005	Decoding Aleil	Aleil Camden	Short film
2006	Perennial	Carly	Short film Nominated for Best Actress 'Golden Sheaf Award' at the Yorkton Film Festival
2008	Cutting for Stone	Lexua	
2008	Sticks & Stones Will Break My Heart	Girl	Short film
2009	Let Him Be	Kathleen Joyce	
2009	Survival of the Dead	Janet / Jane O'Flynn	
2016	The Void	Allison Fraser	
2016	Stake	Sarah	Short film
2016	Snapdragons	Alexa	
2017	A Family Man	Toni	
2017	The Inherent Traits of Connor James	Lea	Short film
2018	Birdland	Sheila Hood	
2018	Knuckleball	Mary	
2019	The Car: Road to Revenge	Daria	
2019	Taos	Rebecca	Short film
2019	Elsewhere	Lydia	
2020	A Perfect Plan	Kate	
2025	The Dogs		

=== Television ===
Year	Title	Role	Notes
2001	Dying to Dance		TV movie Uncredited
2002	Last Call	Scottie Fitzgerald	TV movie aka Fitzgerald
2003	Family Curse	Gina	TV movie
2003	111 Gramercy Park	Elizabeth	TV movie
2003	1-800-Missing	Secretary	Episode: "Thin Air"
2003	Tarzan	Rachel	Episode: "Secrets and Lies"
2004	Show Me Yours	Young Irene	Episode: "War & Peace"
2004	Murdoch Mysteries	Mrs. Eakins	TV movie Episode: "Poor Tom Is Cold"
2004	Kevin Hill	Monica Salzburg	Episode: "Making the Grade"
2005	Ice Age Columbus: Who Were the First Americans?	Zia	TV documentary
2005–2006	Beautiful People	Annabelle Banks	Main role, 15 episodes
2007	Suspect	Det. Mary Grosz	TV movie
2007	The Dresden Files	Heather Bram	Episode: "Hair of the Dog"
2007	Durham County	Nathalie Lacroix	6 episodes
2007	Moonlight	Tina Haggans	Episode: "Fleur de Lis"
2007, 2012	Supernatural	Katie's Mom / Elizabeth	2 episodes
2008	Cold Case	Brenda MacDowell	Episode: "The Road"
2008	Accidental Friendship	Tami Baumann	TV movie
2008–2012	CSI: NY	Samantha Flack	4 episodes
2009	Without a Trace	Natalia Baldwin	Episode: "Hard Landing"
2009	Flashpoint	Laura Scheinmann	Episode: "Last Dance" (Won 2010 ACTRA Award for Best Female Performance)
2009	NCIS: Los Angeles	Aimee Su	Episode: "Killshot"
2010	The Wild Girl	Margaret Hawkins	TV movie
2010, 2012	Republic of Doyle	Jane Doe / Annabelle	2 episodes
2010–2011	Stargate Universe	Amanda Perry	4 episodes
2010–2011	Haven	Audrey Parker	Recurring role, 4 episodes
2010–2013	Call Me Fitz	Ali Devon	Main role, 33 episodes
2011	Nikita	Leela Kantaria	Episode: "Coup de Grace"
2011	Against the Wall	Eileen	Episode: "We Protect Our Own"
2011–2012	Alphas	Danielle Rosen	Recurring role, 8 episodes
2014	Clementine	Lydia	
2014–2015	Resurrection	Rachael Braidwood	Recurring role, 16 Episodes
2015	Motive	Ashley Kirkwell	Episode 3.10
2015	Love Is a Four-Letter Word	Sarah	TV movie
2015–2018	Patriot	Alice Tavner	Main role, 18 episodes
2016	Second Chance	Liz Kenyon	Episode: "Admissions"
2016	NCIS: New Orleans	Anita Karr	Episode: "Means to an End"
2016	Scorpion	Oksana Nastrova	Episode: "Chernobyl Intentions"
2017	Law & Order: Special Victims Unit	Evelyn Bundy	Episode: "Contrapasso"
2018	Strangers	Mari	Main role: 8 episodes
2019	Chicago Med	Andrea Danover	Episode 5.04 "Infection: Part 2"
2019	Chicago P.D.	Andrea Danover	Episode 7.04 "Infection: Part 3"
2020	S.W.A.T.	Alicia Baldwin	Episode: "Stigma"
2020–2022	FBI	FBI Assistant Director in Charge Rina Trenholm	Recurring role, 8 episodes
2023	Law & Order: Organized Crime	D.A. Rika Harold	2 episodes
2023	City on Fire	Detective PJ McFadden	Main role, 8 episodes
2024	High Potential	Bethany Reed	Episode: "Croaked"
2024–Present	Law & Order Toronto: Criminal Intent	Det. Sgt. Frankie Bateman	Main role
