= Inch by Inch =

Inch by Inch may refer to:

- Inch by Inch (film), 1985 gay pornographic video
- Inch by Inch, book by Leo Lionni
- Inch by Inch: 45 Haiku by Issa, anthology book of Buddhism-related poems, translated by Nanao Sakaki

== Music ==
- Inch by Inch, album by Sandra Beech

=== Songs ===
- "Inch by Inch", song by The Strikers (funk band)
- "Inch by Inch", song by The Plimsouls from Everywhere at Once
- "Inch by Inch", song by Elvis Costello from Goodbye Cruel World (album)
- "Inch by Inch", song by Hugh Dillon Redemption Choir from album The High Co$t of Low Living
- "Inch by Inch", song by Calexico from Aerocalexico
- "Inch by Inch", song by mathcore band Botch originally from The John Birch Conspiracy Theory, featured in compilation album The Unifying Themes of Sex, Death and Religion

== See also ==
- Lines per inch (LPI), measurement of printing resolution in systems that use a halftone screen
