= Headstones (band) =

Canadian rock band

- Origin: Kingston, Ontario, Canada
- Genres: Hard rock, alternative rock
- Years active: 1989–2003; 2011–present
- Labels: Known Accomplice (Cadence Music Group), Frostbyte Media, MapleMusic, MCA
- Members: Hugh Dillon; Trent Carr; Tim White; Steve Carr; Jesse Labovitz
- Past members: Mark Gibson; Dale Harrison; Rickferd Van Dyk
- Website: headstonesband.com

Headstones are a Canadian punk-influenced rock band that was formed in Kingston, Ontario, in 1989, broke up in 2003, and then reunited in 2011. Consisting of vocalist Hugh Dillon, guitarist Trent Carr, bassist Tim White, keyboardist Steve Carr, and Jesse Labovitz on drums, and a reputation for high energy, "more rock less super shock" stage presence, and interaction with the audience, they frequently draw capacity crowds at mid-sized venues. Their songwriting tackles many serious and controversial topics. Between 1996 and 2016, Headstones were among the top 150 best-selling Canadian artists and among the top 35 best-selling Canadian bands in Canada.

== History ==
The band signed to MCA Records in 1992. They released their debut album in June 1993, which was entitled Picture of Health, with original drummer Mark Gibson, who left the band after touring in support of the release. Dale Harrison was recruited for the follow-up Teeth & Tissue in 1995. To promote the album, the band went on a two-month, 44-city tour. In 1996, the Headstones received Juno Award nominations for Best Group and Best Rock Album. In 1997, the band released their next album, Smile & Wave. Three years later, Nickels for Your Nightmares was released, and both Carr and Harrison became fathers, while Dillon recovered from drug addiction.

The band released a compilation album, Greatest Fits, in 2001. In 2002, the band signed with MapleMusic, and released their next album, The Oracle of Hi-Fi. In September 2003, the band announced on their website that they had broken up, citing personal and professional causes.

Dillon started a new band, the Hugh Dillon Redemption Choir, whose debut album The High Co$t of Low Living was released in June 2005. Dillon has found success in acting, appearing in several films, including Hard Core Logo, Dance Me Outside, Trailer Park Boys: The Movie, Assault on Precinct 13 and the television series, Mayor of Kingstown, Durham County, Degrassi: The Next Generation, Flashpoint and Continuum. In addition, their song "Come On" was featured in the videogame Triple Play 2002, and was also the theme for the Canadian version of the sketch comedy show, Comedy Inc.

White went on to become a music producer and composer for television and film, and also had a successful career as a voice actor, becoming the voice of such brands Nissan, Purolator, Advil, Toyota, Mr Clean and more.

=== Reunion ===
Headstones reunited for four shows in February 2011, and eight more in December: two in Vancouver and one each in Edmonton, Calgary, Toronto, London, Guelph, Peterborough and Niagara Falls, New York.

After reforming the band and getting back onstage, the Headstones went back into the studio to record a new album. Released in 2013, Love + Fury was crowdfunded through PledgeMusic, before being released by Universal Music. The album garnered the band their first top 10 album, and #1 hit single "Long Way to Neverland". This was in followed in 2014 with another crowd-funded album, the acoustic covers collection One in the Chamber Music. The band's next album, Little Army, was released on June 2, 2017, on Known Accomplice, an imprint of Cadence Music Group. It includes the hit single "Devil's on Fire". With this release the band gave their fans an exclusive behind the scenes look into the making of the album, in real time.

A remastered edition of Picture of Health with bonus tracks was released in October 2018. On March 15, 2019, the band released a cover of Gordon Lightfoot's "The Wreck of the Edmund Fitzgerald". Their next album, PeopleSkills, was released by Known Accomplice on October 25, 2019, and is the band's first full album to be released on vinyl. The album's lead single, "Leave It All Behind", reached number 8 on the Billboard Canada Rock chart. The band's newest album, Flight Risk, was released on October 14, 2022.

In April 2025, the band signed on to Dine Alone Records and soon after released a single, "NAVIGATE". In June 2025, Headstones announced their new album, BURN ALL THE SHIPS, which was released on September 19, 2025.

== Discography ==
=== Studio albums ===
Year	Title	Peak chart positions	Certifications
Year	Title	CAN	CAN
1993	Picture of Health	—	Platinum
1995	Teeth & Tissue	62	Gold
1997	Smile & Wave	36	Gold
2000	Nickels for Your Nightmares	34	
2002	The Oracle of Hi-Fi	47	
2013	Love + Fury	7	
2014	One in the Chamber Music	—	
2017	Little Army	26	
2019	PeopleSkills	45	
2022	Flight Risk	—	
2025	Burn All the Ships	—	

=== Compilation albums ===
Year	Title	Chart positions	Certifications
Year	Title	CAN	CAN
2001	The Greatest Fits	43	

=== Singles ===
Year	Title	Peak Chart Position			Certifications CAN	Album
Year	Title	CAN	CAN Rock/Alt	CAN Content (Cancon)	Certifications CAN	Album
1993	"When Something Stands for Nothing"	71	—	—	Platinum	Picture of Health
1993	"It's All Over"	—	—	1		Picture of Health
1994	"Tweeter and the Monkey Man"	—	—	—		Picture of Health
1994	"Cemetery"	—	—	—		Picture of Health
1994	"Three Angels"	—	—	3		Picture of Health
1995	"Unsound"	58	8	—		Teeth & Tissue
1995	"Hearts, Love & Honour"	—	—	—		Teeth & Tissue
1997	"Cubically Contained"	20	8	—		Smile & Wave
1997	"Smile & Wave"	57	14	—		Smile & Wave
1997	"And"	—	—	—		Smile & Wave
1997	"Without a Sound"	—	—	—		Smile & Wave
2000	"Settle"	—	4	—		Nickels for Your Nightmares
2000	"Blonde & Blue"	—	8	—		Nickels for Your Nightmares
2000	"Fuck You"	—	—	—		Nickels for Your Nightmares
2001	"Blowtorch"	—	—	—		The Greatest Fits
2001	"Come On"	—	—	—		The Greatest Fits
2002	"Reframed (Every Single Failure)"	—	—	—		The Oracle of Hi-Fi
2003	"Tiny Teddy"	—	—	—		The Oracle of Hi-Fi
2013	"Long Way To Neverland"	87	2	—		Love + Fury
2013	"Far Away from Here"	—	6	—		Love + Fury
2014	"Colourless"	—	37	—		One in the Chamber Music
2017	"Devil's On Fire"	—	6	—		Little Army
2017	"Broken"	—	30	—		Little Army
2019	"The Wreck of the Edmund Fitzgerald"	—	—	—		Non album-single
2019	"Leave It All Behind"	—	8	—		PeopleSkills
2020	"Horses"	—	22	—		PeopleSkills
2022	"Tangled"	—	—	—		Flight Risk
2022	"Flight Risk"	—	—	—		Flight Risk
2022	"Psychotropic"	—	—	—		Flight Risk
2025	"Navigate"	—	2	—		Burn All the Ships
2025	"Daylight Lightning"	—	—	—		Burn All the Ships
2025	"Decades"	—	—	—		Burn All the Ships

== See also ==
- Music of Canada
- Rock music of Canada
