= The Wonderful World of The Pursuit of Happiness =

The Wonderful World of the Pursuit of Happiness

Studio album by the Pursuit of Happiness
- Released: October 23, 1996
- Recorded: 1996
- Genre: Rock
- Length: 35:51
- Label: Iron Music Group
- Producer: Moe Berg; Aubrey Winfield

The Pursuit of Happiness chronology
Where's the Bone (1995)	The Wonderful World of the Pursuit of Happiness (1996)	Sex and Food: The Best of The Pursuit of Happiness (2000)

The Wonderful World of the Pursuit of Happiness is the fifth studio album by Canadian power pop band the Pursuit of Happiness. It was their second album released under the now-defunct Canadian label Iron Music Group. The album, released in late 1996, was produced by the band's singer/guitarist/songwriter Moe Berg, and co-produced by the label's founder, Aubrey Winfield.

All of the tracks on the album are under four minutes in length, with the majority of them under three minutes, and there is no separation between tracks. As Berg explained, "The idea with this record was to format it so that a person could listen to the entire thing in one sitting, and since it's just over a half an hour it's definitely something people can get through without much effort."

Although the band has never officially broken up, after this release their new recordings have been restricted to individual songs for compilation albums, including "Edmonton Block Heater" on A Tribute to Hard Core Logo.

Professional ratings
Review scores
Source	Rating
Allmusic	link

== Track listing ==
All songs written by Moe Berg

1. "The Wonderful World" (0:30)
2. "Tara" (2:19)
3. "I Like You" (1:32)
4. "Carmalina" (2:52)
5. "Metaphor" (2:11)
6. "She's The Devil" (2:01)
7. "She Kiss Away" (3:28)
8. "I'm Just Happy To Be Here" (3:02)
9. "Tara's Theme" (3:52)
10. "What You Did To My Girl" (2:20)
11. "Let's Not Play" (3:30)
12. "Hate Engine" (2:22)
13. "Back Of My Mind" (3:23)
14. "The Truth" (2:29)
15. "I Like You" (single version, bonus/hidden track)

== Personnel ==
- Moe Berg – vocals, guitar
- Kris Abbott – guitar, vocals
- Brad Barker – bass
- Dave Gilby – drums, percussion

Guest Musicians

- Jennifer Foster – vocals on "Tara," "Carmelina," and "Let's Not Play"
- Matt Horner – keyboards, synthesizers, accordion
- Sarah McElcheran - flugelhorn, recorder
- Melanie Doane - violin
