= 1899 in rail transport =

This article lists events related to rail transport that occurred in 1899.

== Events ==
=== January events ===
- January 2 – The first part of the Jakarta Kota–Anyer Kidul railway on the island of Java is opened between Batavia Zuid (Jakarta Kota) and Tangerang.

=== February events ===
- February 9 – Minneapolis and St. Louis Railway purchases the Minneapolis, New Ulm and Southern.
- February 21 – Gdadebo II, the Alake of Egba in modern-day southeast Nigeria, signs an agreement with the British Governor of Lagos Colony to lease lands for construction of a new railway from Aro to Abeokuta.

=== March events ===
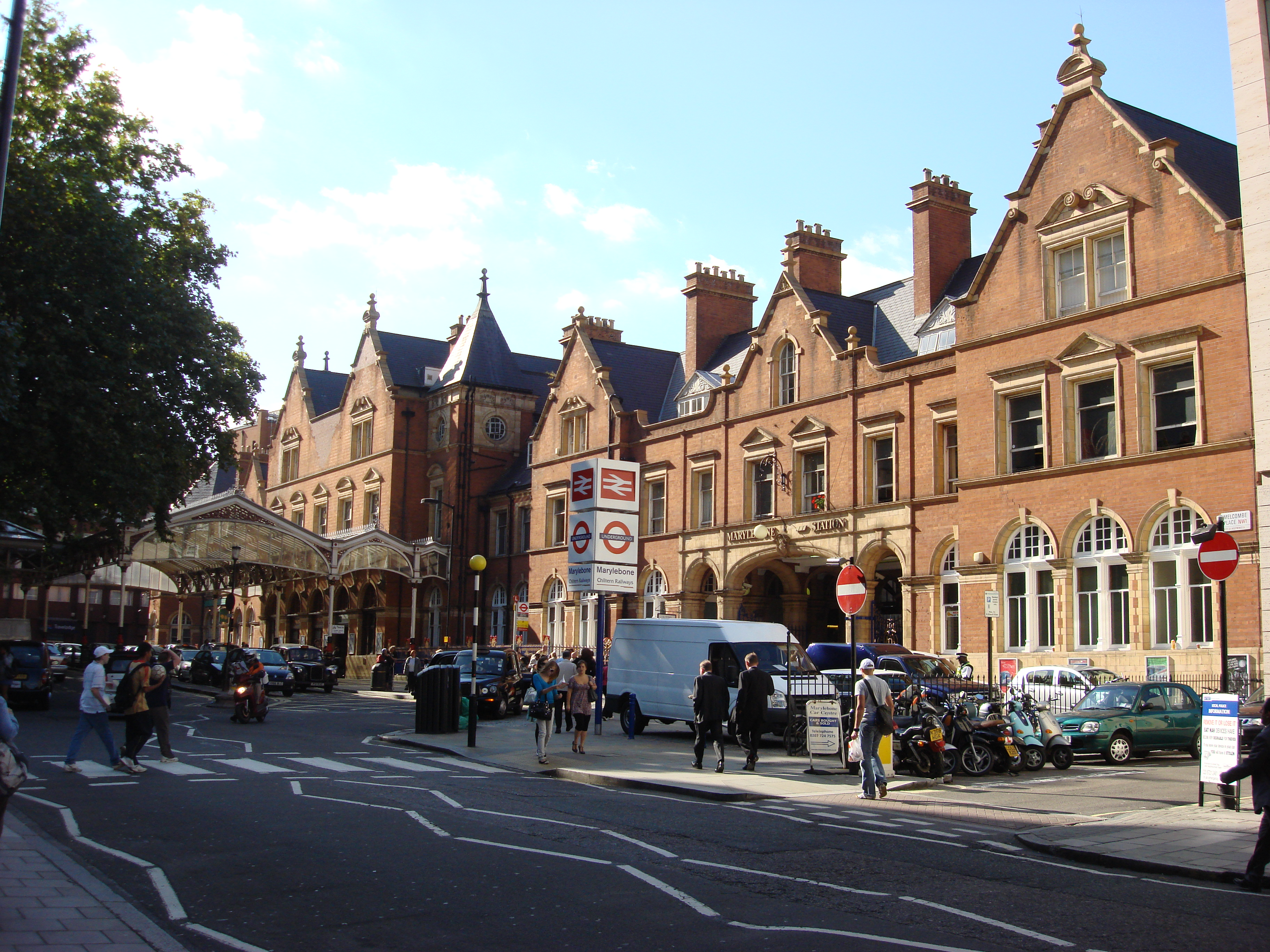
Modest exterior of H.W. Braddock's Marylebone station building in London

- March 12 – Southern Railway in the United States inaugurates the Piedmont Limited passenger train service.
- March 15 – Marylebone Station, the new London terminus of the Great Central Railway, is opened.
- March – The first of Victoria's 2 ft 6 in (0.76 m) narrow-gauge railways opens between Wangaratta and Whitfield.

=== April events ===
- April 15 – Chicago's Lake Street 'L' is extended at grade level beyond the City Limits at 52nd Avenue and reaches Austin. On May 15, it is extended into suburban Oak Park.

=== May events ===
- May 12 – The Swedish Railway Employees' Union (Svenska Järnvägsmannaförbundet, SJMF, "Sweden Railworkers' League"), the country's first such trade union, is founded. It survives until 1970, when it merges into a labor union of Swedish government employees.
- May 13 – A train wreck near Reading, Pennsylvania kills 28 people and injures 50.

=== June events ===
- June 2 – American outlaws Robert L. Parker (Butch Cassidy) and Harry A. Longabaugh ("The Sundance Kid") commit their first armed robbery as "The Wild Bunch", stopping a Union Pacific train near Wilcox, Wyoming, with accomplices Harvey Logan and Elzy Lay, and steal more than $30,000 worth of cargo.
- June 18 – Canadian Pacific Railway inaugurates the Imperial Limited passenger train between Montreal, Quebec, and Vancouver.

=== July events ===
- July 17 – Hankaku Railroad Line, Osaka to Fukuchiyama route, is officially completed in Japan (as predecessor of the JR Takarazuka Line and Fukuchiyama Line).
- July 21 – The Burgdorf–Thun railway in Switzerland becomes the first to operate with an alternating current electrification system, using a three-phase overhead at 750 V 40 Hz.
- July 23 – After successfully lobbying for a change in Canadian Federal regulations and a new city by-law to allow the service, the Ottawa Electric Railway begins Sunday operations.
- July 30 – The Terminal Railroad Association of St. Louis is formed to handle switching and transfer chores in St. Louis. The sponsoring railroads are the Missouri Pacific Railroad, Iron Mountain and Southern, Wabash Railroad, Ohio and Mississippi Railroad, Louisville and Nashville Railroad and the Cleveland, Cincinnati, Chicago and St. Louis Railroad.

=== August events ===
- August 8 – Atlantic Coast Line Railroad predecessor Atlantic Coast Line Railroad Company of South Carolina acquires from the Central of Georgia its half-interest in the lease of the Georgia Railroad; the ACL now has direct access to Atlanta.
- August 27 – Rail transport in Sudan: The Atbara railroad bridge over the Nile near Khartoum, fabricated by American engineers, is completed.

=== September events ===
- September 18
  - The Gyeongin Line, predecessor Noryangjin to Jemulpo, and the first railway line built on the Korean Peninsula, opens.
  - New Haven Railroad signs a deal with Sanderson & Porter, construction contractors, acquiring control of the People's Tramway in Connecticut.

=== October events ===
- October 14 – North British Railway submits its proposal to absorb the Aberlady, Gullane and North Berwick Railway in Scotland by a stock exchange transaction.

=== November events ===
- November 8 – Jōbu Railway is founded in Japan.
- November 15 – The New York Central Railroad leases the Boston and Albany Railroad.
- November 16 – A British Army troop train is wrecked in South Africa near Estcourt by the Boers and 56 men are taken prisoner, including war correspondent Winston Churchill.
- November 27 – The Ottoman Empire grants Germany's Deutsche Bank the concession to finance the construction of the Berlin–Baghdad railway, following a visit by Kaiser Wilhelm II to Constantinople in 1898 as a guest of Sultan Abdul Hamid II.

=== December events ===
- December 31 – Rail transport in Sudan: The desert railway from Wadi Halfa is completed throughout to Khartoum by British military engineers on 1,067 mm (3 ft 6 in) gauge.

=== Unknown date events ===
- Maine Central Railroad Calais Branch is completed connecting Washington County, Maine to the United States rail network.
- William Cornelius Van Horne retires as president of Canadian Pacific Railway; he is succeeded by Thomas George Shaughnessy.
- Alexander J. Cassatt becomes president of the Pennsylvania Railroad.
- American Car and Foundry is formed from the merger of 13 smaller rolling stock manufacturers across the United States. Southern Car and Foundry, later to become part of American Car and Foundry, is founded in Memphis, Tennessee.
- Niagara, St. Catharines and Toronto Railway is formed in Ontario, Canada, by reorganization of the St. Catharines and Niagara Central Railway.
- Establishment in London, England, of The Railway Club, which will be the oldest society in the world for railway enthusiasts at the time of its closure in 2009.
- William Truesdale becomes president of the Lackawanna Railroad, and initiates a bold plan to upgrade the road's facilities.

== Births ==
=== January births ===
- January 15 – Robert Stetson Macfarlane, president of Northern Pacific Railway 1951–1966, is born.

=== Unknown date births ===
- John W. Barriger III, president of the Monon Railroad 1946–1953, Pittsburgh and Lake Erie Railroad 1954–1964, Missouri–Kansas–Texas Railroad 1965–1970 and the Boston and Maine Railroad 1973–1974 (died 1976).

== Deaths ==
=== September deaths ===
- September 12 – Cornelius Vanderbilt II, president of the New York Central system (born 1843).
