= Sex and food =

Sex and food may refer to:

- Sex & Food, a 2018 album by New Zealand band Unknown Mortal Orchestra
- Sex and Food: The Best of The Pursuit of Happiness, a 2000 album by Canadian rock band The Pursuit of Happiness
- Food and sexuality, the relationship between food and sex
