= I'm an Adult Now =

Single by The Pursuit of Happiness

from the album Love Junk
- Released: 1986 (original version); 1988 (rerecorded version)
- Genre: Alternative rock
- Length: 4:21 (original version); 4:30 (rerecorded version)
- Label: Chrysalis
- Songwriter: Moe Berg
- Producer: Todd Rundgren

"I'm an Adult Now" is a song by Moe Berg recorded by Canadian band The Pursuit of Happiness (TPOH). It was written in 1985, produced independently, and first released in 1986 as a 12-inch single. Later that year, the band released a self-produced music video. As a result of the video viewership, all copies of the 12-inch single the band had pressed sold out. The song was nominated for "Single of the Year" at the 1987 CASBY Awards. The band became an "independent success story" because of the song and video, and owing to this popularity was signed by Chrysalis Records in 1988. In 1988, a rerecorded version of the song was released.

The record label managers asked lead singer and songwriter Moe Berg for a list of "dream producers" for the band's forthcoming album, and he asked for Todd Rundgren. Berg was "shell-shocked" when Rundgren called him while the band was performing a soundcheck before a show in Winnipeg, telling Berg that he would be producing the band's album. Rundgren flew to Toronto to see the band perform in concert at the Diamond Club. After a Canada Day concert, the band drove from Toronto to the Utopia Sound Studios in Lake Hill, New York, where they set up for recording the next day. A preview concert was held at Lee's Palace on September 23 1988, and the album Love Junk was released on October 26 1988. By March 1990 it had been certified a platinum album by Music Canada, exceeding 100,000 units shipped throughout the country. (Rundgren also produced the band's second album, One Sided Story.)

In January 1989, the Rundgren-produced remake of the song peaked at number 6 on the Billboard Alternative songs chart. It also peaked at number 22 on the Mainstream Rock chart, on which it was featured for 11 weeks.

== Music video ==
Berg was a friend of director Nelu Ghiran, whom he hired in 1986 to produce a low budget music video for the song. Berg said that "the video cost [the band] almost nothing, just the cost of film processing". It received immediate airplay on the Canadian music television station Much Music and the music video television show Toronto Rocks. The band released a 12-inch single on its own TPOH label, selling out 1,500 copies because of the greater exposure from airing of the video. The song received airplay on Toronto alternative radio station CFNY and rock station Q107.

This drew the attention of executives at record label WEA Music Canada, which obtained rights to re-press the single for national distribution in 1987. The remastered single sold "about 10,000 copies". A new video was also recorded. The label did not exercise its rights to sign the band to a recording contract.

The US cable television station MTV at first refused to broadcast the music video because of its references to drug and alcohol use and sex, but that decision was later reconsidered and the video was aired. The band later performed live at MTV studios.

The Ghiran video was nominated for the Best Video award for the Juno Awards of 1987. It was included as one of "The Most Important 16 Videos in Canadian Pop" by John Martin in Shakin' All Over: The Rock'N'Roll Years in Canada published in 1989.

== Charts ==
Chart (1986)	Peak position
Canada	35
Chart (1990)	Peak position
Australia (ARIA)	39
