= Hugh Dillon =

Canadian musician, actor, and television producer (born 1963)

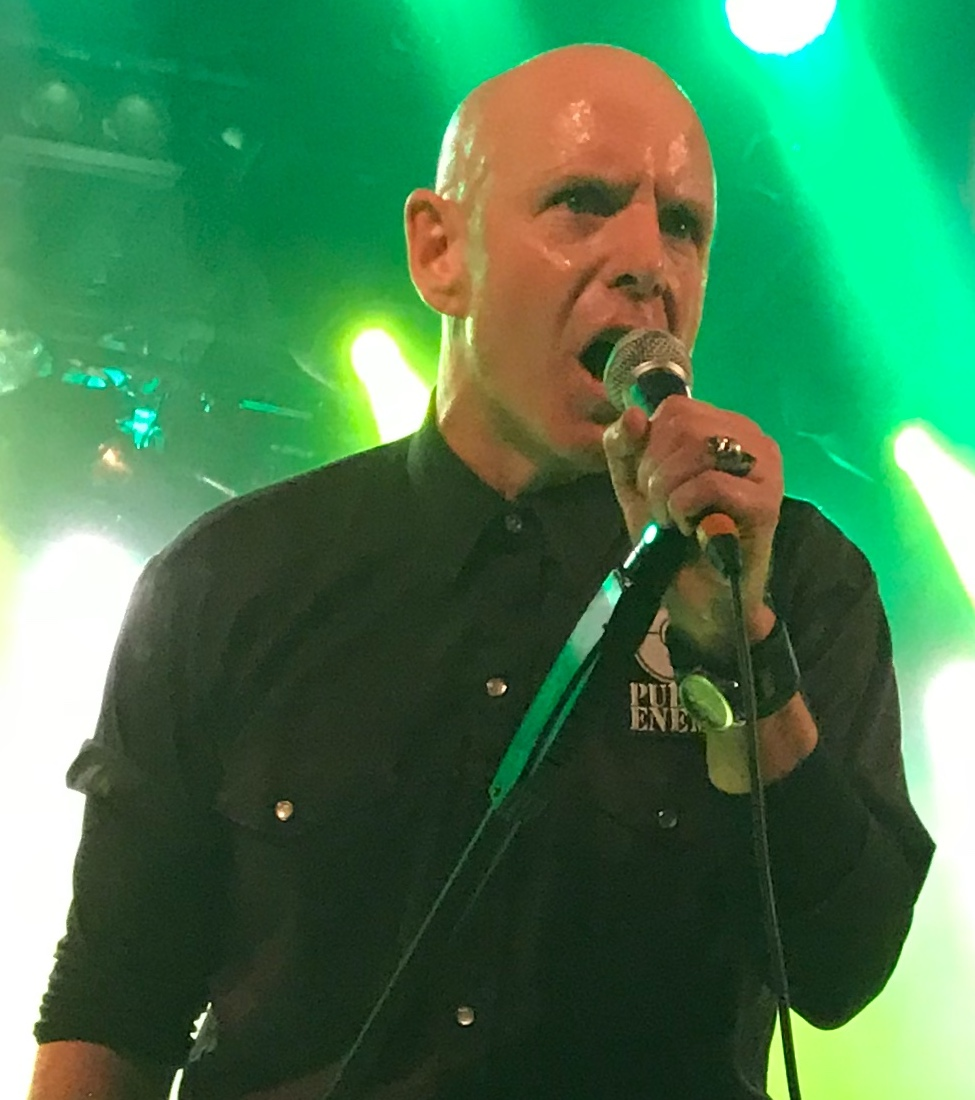
- Dillon performing in 2017

Background information
- Born: May 31, 1963 (age 63); Kingston, Ontario, Canada
- Genres: Hard rock, rock 'n' roll
- Occupations: Singer, actor, writer, producer
- Years active: 1987–present
- Member of: Headstones; Hugh Dillon Redemption Choir
- Website: hughdillon.com

Hugh Dillon (born May 31, 1963) is a Canadian singer, actor, writer and producer. The lead vocalist of the rock bands Headstones and Hugh Dillon Redemption Choir, his acting roles include Albert Manning in Degrassi: The Next Generation, Mike Sweeney in Durham County, Ed Lane in Flashpoint, Nick in Left 4 Dead 2, Duncan Sinclair in X Company, Donnie Haskell in Yellowstone, and Ian Ferguson in Mayor of Kingstown. He is also a co-creator, executive producer, and series regular of the Paramount+ series Mayor of Kingstown.

== Early life ==
Dillon was born and grew up in Kingston, Ontario. Dillon grew up living on the same street as future NHL star Doug Gilmour and played hockey with him in their neighbourhood. Dillon also played hockey with Paul Langlois, future guitarist of The Tragically Hip. Dillon attended the Kingston Collegiate and Vocational Institute at the same time that David Usher, and members of The Tragically Hip such as Gord Downie attended the school. After high school, Dillon briefly attended Queen's University and lived in London, England, before moving to Toronto. As of 2017, he divides his time between there and Los Angeles.

== Music career ==
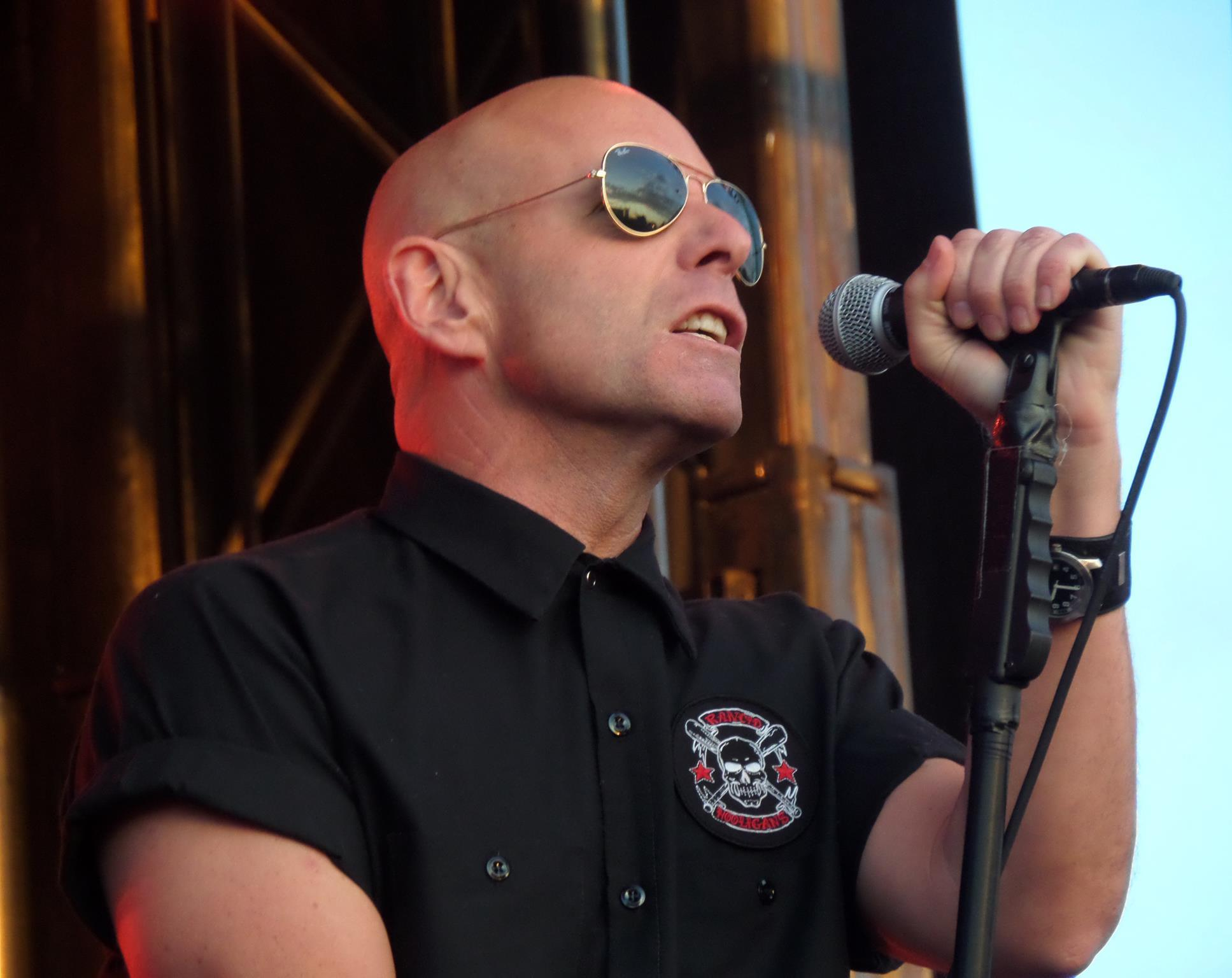
Dillon performing at K-Days 2015

Dillon is the lead singer for rock band Headstones. Formed in 1987, the band's debut album Picture of Health was released in 1993 and featured the singles "When Something Stands For Nothing", "Cemetery", "Tweeter and the Monkey Man", and "Three Angels".

After the Headstones broke up in 2003, Dillon formed the band Hugh Dillon Redemption Choir, an indie rock band whose style draws from country, pop, punk, and new wave influences. Band members were guitarist J.P. Polsoni, Chris Osti on bass, keyboardist Ben Kobayashi, and percussionist Derek Downham. The band released an album, The High Co$t of Low Living, in 2005 through The Tragically Hip guitarist Paul Langlois's Ching Music label. Dillon also released a solo album entitled Works Well with Others in 2009 through Ching Music, which debuted at #51 on the Canadian Albums Chart.

After their hiatus, original Headstones members (Dillon, Carr, and White) reformed the band in 2011. In 2013, they crowdfunded their album, Love + Fury, through PledgeMusic. Love + Fury is the band's first top 10 album, and it garnered the band a No. 1 hit single. The Headstones followed up with another crowdfunded album in 2014, One in the Chamber Music. In 2015, Fuck It became the band's first-ever vinyl release.

Little Army was released on Cadence Music in 2017. The album included the No. 1 hit "Devil's On Fire". In 2019, the Headstones released Peopleskills, which yielded "Leave It All Behind" and "Horses", two No. 3 singles on the US Billboard charts.

== Acting career ==
Dillon's first large-screen acting role was in director Bruce McDonald's 1995 film Dance Me Outside. He then played a leading role as Joe Dick in McDonald's 1996 feature film, Hard Core Logo.

Dillon has appeared in a number of feature films, including Lone Hero, Assault on Precinct 13, and Ginger Snaps Back: The Beginning. In 2007, he was nominated for a 2007 Genie Award for Best Supporting Actor for his role in Trailer Park Boys: The Movie. He starred opposite Vera Farmiga in the Sundance Film Festival award-winning movie, Down to the Bone. Dillon has guest-starred on various television programs, including The Eleventh Hour, ReGenesis, and Degrassi: The Next Generation. He has also created voice-overs a number of television and radio advertisements.

Dillon starred as Mike Sweeney in the Canadian dramatic series Durham County. His performance earned him a Gemini nomination for Best Actor in 2008; the show itself won five Gemini awards and its second season was aired on TMN and Movie Central.

Dillon starred as Sergeant Ed Lane in the CTV/CBS police drama series Flashpoint, set in Toronto, which ran for five seasons between 2008 and 2012. Dillon won the "Shaw Media Award for Best Performance by an Actor in a Continuing Leading Dramatic Role" at the Canadian Screen Awards in 2014 for his performance in the episode "Fit for Duty" on Flashpoint.

Dillon is the co-creator, writer, and executive producer of the streaming service series Mayor of Kingstown on Paramount+. On August 5 via Deadline, it was announced that Dillon would also become a series regular playing the role of Ian Ferguson, alongside Jeremy Renner, and he will return as Sheriff Donnie Haskell on season 4 of the cable series Yellowstone on Paramount, alongside Kevin Costner. He also played the role of Francis Becker on the third season of the American crime drama series, The Killing opposite Joel Kinnaman, simultaneously appearing on Continuum. Dillon played a lead role for three seasons of CBC's X Company. Dillon has also appeared in Twin Peaks, the film Wind River alongside Elizabeth Olsen and Jeremy Renner, Syfy's The Expanse, and the films The Humanity Bureau and I Still See You.

== Filmography ==
=== Film ===
| Year | Title | Role | Notes |
|---|---|---|---|
| 1994 | Dance Me Outside | Clarence Gaskill | |
| 1995 | Curtis's Charm | Spitting White Trash Thug | |
| 1996 | Hard Core Logo | Joe Dick / Joseph Mulgrew | |
| 1999 | Johnny | Dell and Alice's Dad | |
| 2002 | Lone Hero | King | |
| 2004 | Down to the Bone | Bob | |
| 2004 | Ginger Snaps Back: The Beginning | Reverend Gilbert | |
| 2005 | Assault on Precinct 13 | Tony | |
| 2006 | Hope and a Little Sugar | Bar Construction Worker | |
| 2006 | Trailer Park Boys: The Movie | Sonny | |
| 2008 | Surveillance | Steven | |
| 2008 | About Face | The Agent | |
| 2008 | Down to the Dirt | Renny | |
| 2011 | Issues | Bobby | Short film |
| 2015 | The Offer | Richard | Short film |
| 2016 | Dark Harvest | Vincent | |
| 2017 | Wind River | Curtis | |
| 2017 | The Humanity Bureau | Adam Westinghouse | |
| 2018 | I Still See You | Mathison | |

=== Television ===
| Year | Title | Role | Notes |
|---|---|---|---|
| 2000 | Twitch City | Howard the Cannibal / Guy in the Convenience Store | 2 episodes |
| 2002–2003 | Degrassi: The Next Generation | Albert Manning | 3 episodes |
| 2003 | Blue Murder | Kevin Marshall | Episode: "Necklace" |
| 2003 | Starhunter | Gus | Episode: "Biocrime" |
| 2004 | The Eleventh Hour | Eddie | Episode: "Hard Seven" |
| 2004 | The Love Crimes of Gillian Guess | Bobby Tomahawk | TV movie |
| 2004 | The Wool Cap | Leather Jacket | TV movie |
| 2004–2005 | ReGenesis | Danny Dexter | 3 episodes |
| 2005 | Our Fathers | Johnny DeFranco | TV movie |
| 2007 | The Gathering | Detective Gamble | 2 episodes |
| 2007–2010 | Durham County | Mike Sweeney | Series lead |
| 2008 | The Quality of Life | Jean Tellier | TV movie |
| 2008 | Of Murder and Memory | Vincent Nichol | TV movie |
| 2008 | Ink: Alter Egos Exposed | Narrator | TV movie |
| 2008–2012 | Flashpoint | Ed Lane | Series lead |
| 2013 | The Killing | Francis Becker | 12 episodes |
| 2013 | Continuum | Mr. Escher | 7 episodes |
| 2014 | Things You Shouldn't Say Past Midnight | Gene | 8 episodes |
| 2015–2017 | X Company | Colonel Duncan Sinclair | Series regular |
| 2017 | The Expanse | Lieutenant Sutton | 3 episodes |
| 2017 | Twin Peaks | Tom Paige | Episode: "Part 7" |
| 2018 | The Detectives | Detective Rod Piukkala | Episode: "Stranger Calling" |
| 2018–2021 | Yellowstone | Sheriff Donnie Haskell | Series regular |
| 2021–present | Mayor of Kingstown | Ian Ferguson | Series regular; also co-creator, writer & executive producer |

=== Video games ===
| Year | Title | Role | Notes |
|---|---|---|---|
| 2009 | Left 4 Dead 2 | Nick | Valve |
| 2012 | Dishonored | City Watch | Bethesda |
| 2013 | Resident Evil 6 | Nick | Capcom X Valve Crossover DLC |

== Discography ==
=== Headstones ===
- Picture of Health (1993)
- Teeth and Tissue (1995)
- Smile and Wave (1997)
- Nickels for Your Nightmares (2000)
- The Greatest Fits (2001)
- The Oracle of Hi-Fi (2002)
- Love + Fury (2013)
- One in the Chamber Music (2014)
- Little Army (2017)
- PeopleSkills (2019)
- Flight Risk (2022)
- Burn All The Ships (2025)

=== Hugh Dillon Redemption Choir ===
- The High Co$t of Low Living (2005)

=== Solo ===
- Works Well with Others (the first solo album, released October 13, 2009. Many of its songs are featured on the television show Flashpoint. Track listing below:)
1. "Friends of Mine"
2. "Sentimental Me"
3. "Well on Your Way"
4. "Ten Feet Tall"
5. "Surface of the Sun"
6. "Reel to Reel"
7. "Lucky"
8. "Lost at Sea"
9. "Radio Plays"
10. "Bottom of a Dream"
11. "My Mistakes"
12. "Ignore That Call"
13. "Puzzle I Am"
14. "Don't Be Fooled"
