= Cambridge University Railway Club =

University club for railway fans

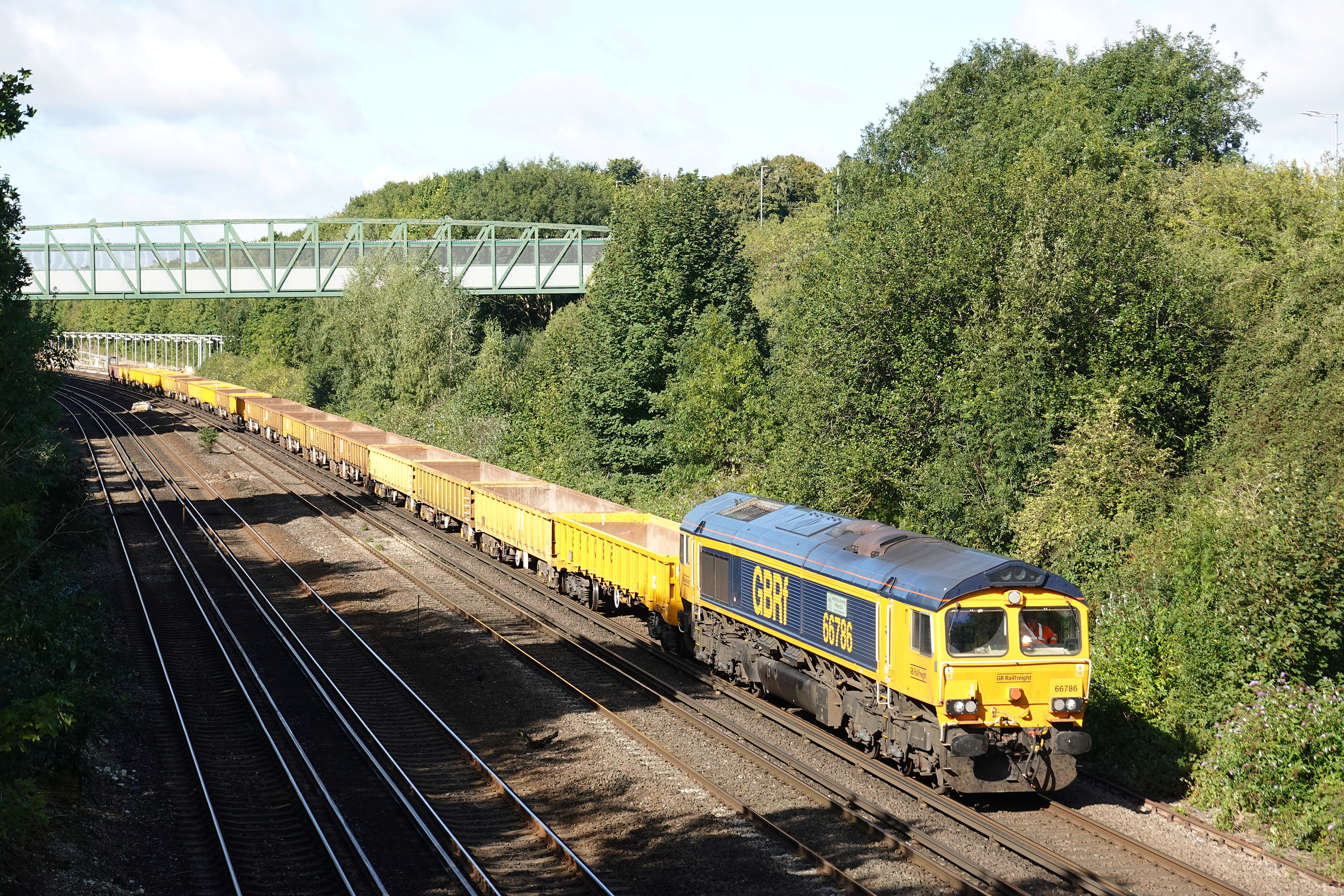
- GBRf locomotive 66786 Cambridge University Railway Club, named after the Club
- Abbreviation: CURC
- Formation: 1911; 115 years ago as The Railway Club; Cambridge University branch
- Founded at: Cambridge, England
- Type: Enthusiasts Society
- Location: Cambridge, England
- Region served: UK, and international
- Fields: Rail Transport
- Publication: The Eagle
- Website: curc.org.uk

The Cambridge University Railway Club (abbreviated as CURC) is one of the clubs and societies in the University of Cambridge. It was formed in 1911. It is the first student railway enthusiast club and the third oldest railway club in the world, after "The Railway Club" (formed 1899 - now defunct) and the Stephenson Locomotive Society (formed 1909). The club is engaged closely with the railway industry.

The CURC activities include:

- Career fairs, promoting career opportunities in the railway industry.
- Meetings, where a line of notable speakers have spoken, including Sir Nigel Gresley, Keith Williams and Sir Peter Hendy.
- Visits, including national railway and underground depot visits, drive simulator and cab rides.
- Annual Photo Competition
- Annual dinner at a Cambridge University college or on train

The CURC had a good friendship with the Oxford University Railway Society (OURS), with an annual Varsity Quiz. However OURS folded in the late 1990s.

== Locomotive and Logo ==
The CURC has a logo of "Eagle", which is the only locomotive designed and built in Cambridge.

CURC adopted a Class 08 locomotive 08631 at Coldham Lane Depot in Cambridge until the depot was mothballed for a time in 1996. In 2022, a Class 66 locomotive 66786 was named after the club at Cambridge Railway Station to commemorate its 110th anniversary.
