= Swamp Baby =

Swamp Baby was a Canadian rock band from Toronto, Ontario, active in the 1990s. They are most noted for collaborating with Michael Turner and Peter J. Moore on the music for the film Hard Core Logo; their song "Who the Hell Do You Think You Are?" won the Genie Award for Best Original Song at the 17th Genie Awards in 1996.

The original band members who played on the first album Swamp Baby (1990), were vocalist Steve Cowal, guitarists Randall Bergs and Ërno Vlasics, bassist Rick Sentence and drummer Jim Mattachione. Ërno Vlasics left the band shortly after the first album was recorded and was replaced by guitar player Mark Bosa. The new line up recorded their second album Rock Heavy Ripple (1995). Both albums were recorded under the independent label First Stone Productions; Moore was the producer of both albums.

Although the band's own music followed a classic rock style that typically saw them compared to Dr. Hook & the Medicine Show, The Black Crowes and The Doors, several of the band's members had prior experience in punk rock bands, leading Moore to ask them to help compose and produce the music for the film. The new line up of Cowal, Bergs, Bosa, Sentence and Mattachione played all of the film's songs, although lead actor Hugh Dillon performed lead vocals in lieu of Cowal.

The band did not record or release any further material after the Hard Core Logo soundtrack.
