= Bernie Coulson =

Canadian actor

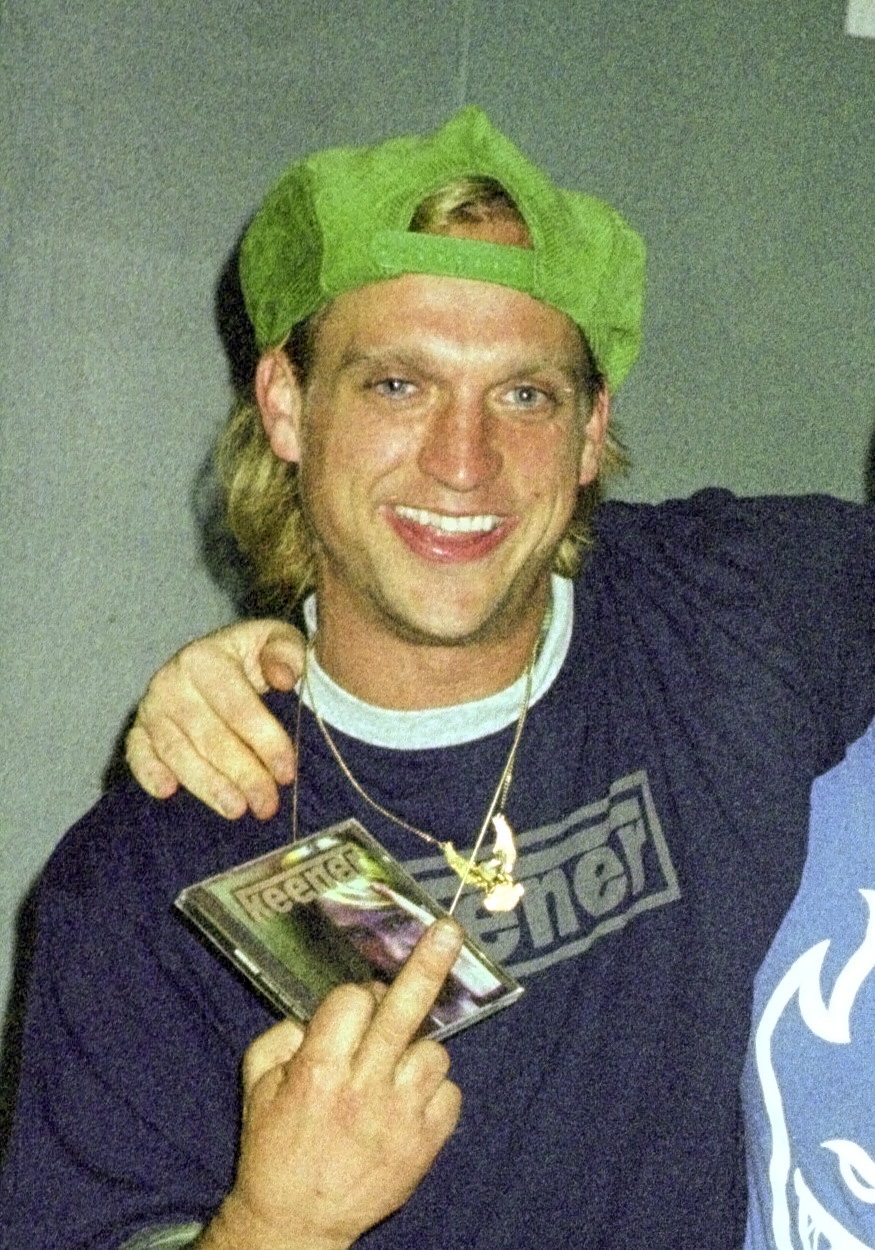
- Coulson in 1998
- Born: Bernard Coulson; 1965 (age 60–61); Vancouver, British Columbia, Canada
- Occupation: Actor
- Years active: 1980–present

Bernard Coulson (born 1965) is a Canadian actor known for his roles as "The Thinker" on The X-Files, as "Michael Reardon" on Intelligence, and as "Pipefitter", the drummer of a reuniting punk band, in the Canadian mockumentary Hard Core Logo.

== Personal life ==
Coulson was born and raised in Vancouver, British Columbia, where he graduated from Magee Secondary School in 1983. Coulson was a musician and drummer and attended the Courtney Youth Music Camp during his summer breaks. As of 2022, Coulson resided in the Vancouver Downtown Eastside where he was in rehab for a drug addiction.

== Career ==
Coulson shared an apartment with Brad Pitt in Los Angeles when they were both starting their careers. Coulson played Sid in the 1979 TV series Huckleberry Finn and His Friends and as Sal in Loverboy. He played Kenneth Joyce, the star witness in the courtroom drama The Accused. He played "Rick Diesel" in Eddie and The Cruisers II, Eddie Lives. On television he has made guest appearances on MacGyver and Murder She Wrote, among others. He has most recently starred in the 2016 Canadian thriller film Dark Harvest as the character Frank Becker.
