= Sol (band) =

Canadian indie rock band

- Origin: Moncton, New Brunswick, Canada
- Genres: Indie rock
- Years active: 1996–1999
- Past members: Stacy Ricker; Robin Anne Ettles; Chris Mersereau

Sol was a Canadian indie rock band in the 1990s. From Moncton, New Brunswick, the band consisted of singer and bassist Stacy Ricker, guitarist Robin Anne Ettles, and drummer Chris Mersereau.

They released their first indie EP, Small Vacations, in 1996. That same year, they also performed a rendition of "Blue Tattoo" on A Tribute to Hard Core Logo. In 1997, they released their full-length debut, Lucinda.

The band played locally in New Brunswick and toured Canada several times, and had singles on campus and community radio. They won an East Coast Music Award for Best Alternative Artist in 1999, but disbanded due to creative differences the same year. A live album was released in 2000.

All three members continue to make music on their own.
