= Picture of Health =

Studio album by Headstones
- Released: 1993
- Recorded: 1992–1993
- Studio: Metalworks, Mississauga, ON
- Genre: Rock
- Length: 43:49
- Label: MCA
- Producer: Mark S. Berry

Headstones chronology
Picture of Health (1993)	Teeth and Tissue (1995)

Picture of Health is the debut album by Canadian rock band Headstones. The music video for the track "Cemetery" is featured on the Canadian DVD release of the movie Hard Core Logo, as well as on the Canadian VHS release of Dance Me Outside, both of which star lead vocalist Hugh Dillon in acting roles. On October 26, 2018, Headstones released a remastered reissue of the album to celebrate its 25th anniversary. The band promoted the reissue of the album with a tour in which they performed Picture of Health in its entirety.

== Critical reception ==
Professional ratings
Review scores
Source	Rating
AllMusic	4/5 stars
Calgary Herald	B+

The Ottawa Citizen wrote: "Despite their bleakness, the songs are surprisingly catchy, a cool blend of guitar-driven blues, rock and pop played with a heavy-handed punk attitude."

== Track listing ==
No.	Title	Length
1.	"It's All Over"	3:05
2.	"Heart of Darkness"	2:56
3.	"When Something Stands for Nothing"	3:37
4.	"Tweeter and the Monkey Man"	3:38
5.	"Absolutely"	3:14
6.	"Three Angels"	4:03
7.	"Oh My God!"	3:21
8.	"Losing Control"	2:36
9.	"Cut"	2:59
10.	"Judy"	4:07
11.	"Won't Wait Again"	2:57
12.	"Where Does It Go?"	4:15
13.	"Cemetery"	3:01
Total length:		43:49

== Certifications ==
On May 7, 1999, Picture of Health was certified platinum by Music Canada.
