= When Something Stands for Nothing =

Single by Headstones

from the album Picture of Health
- Released: 1993
- Genre: Rock
- Length: 3:37
- Label: MCA
- Songwriter(s): Hugh Dillon, Trent Carr, Mark Gibson

Headstones singles chronology
"When Something Stands for Nothing" (1993)	"It's All Over" (1993)

"When Something Stands for Nothing" is the debut single by Canadian rock band Headstones from their debut studio album, Picture of Health. The song peaked at No. 71 on Canada's RPM singles chart, and the single was certified platinum by the CRIA. It is considered to be one of the band's signature songs.

== Track listing ==
1. "When Something Stands for Nothing" (Album Version) - 3:37
2. "Three Angels" - 4:03
3. "Hindsight" - 3:58
4. "Won't Wait Again" - 2:57
