= Chris Lance =

American actor and model (1966–1994)

- Born: Robert Lance Slacke; November 26, 1966; Fort Dix, New Jersey, U.S.
- Died: April 24, 1994 (aged 27); Dallas, Texas, U.S.
- Cause of death: Homicide
- Resting place: Chesapeake Bay
- Other names: Christopher Lance; Bobby; Bobby Slacke
- Occupations: Actor; dancer; model
- Years active: 1985–1994
- Agent: Falcon Studios

Chris Lance (born Robert Lance Slacke; November 26, 1966 – April 24, 1994) was an American actor, model, and dancer. He was known for his extensive work in the gay adult entertainment industry.

== Early life and education ==
Robert Lance Slacke was born on November 26, 1966, in Fort Dix, New Jersey, where he grew up on the military base because his father was in the U.S. Air Force. He graduated from high school in New Jersey and subsequently moved to Dallas, Texas, in 1985. He adopted the stage name Chris Lance (sometimes known as Christopher Lance or his nickname "Bobby" to friends) when he began his entertainment career and was noted for his "boy next door" appearance. He was also known to friends as "Bobby" or "Bobby Slacke".

== Career ==
In Dallas, he worked as an exotic dancer at clubs, including Big Daddy's and the Blue Parrot, throughout the late 1980s and early 1990s. He also worked as a waiter at a French restaurant called The Enclave. He pursued a career in modeling, appearing in numerous gay adult magazines throughout the 1980s and 1990s, and reportedly enjoyed the attention that his adult entertainment career brought him.

He also appeared in gay adult films throughout the 1980s, including The Young & the Hung (1985), in which he played the role of "Country Boy" and was featured on the box cover. He made a number of films for directors such as William Higgins and Matt Sterling. Some of his other known films include Falcon Icons: The 1980s, Road Thrill, The Other Side Of Aspen II, All About Balls, All Male Jizz Jamboree, Ass Worship, Eat A Dick Up Til You Hiccup, Manhole Crews, and Dynastud. The film Catalina Blond, in which he appeared, was released posthumously.

== Personal life ==
Lance dated a man named Ryan Bordener. Their relationship was described as rocky, with domestic quarrels.

== Death ==
He died at Parkland Hospital on April 24, 1994, in an upper-class suburb of Dallas (specifically the Oak Lawn area), Texas, at the age of 27. He and Ryan Bordener stabbed each other with a knife during a quarrel. Lance's partner survived the stabbing and faced no charges, as investigators ruled it self-defense. At the time of his death, he was also listed as a resident of Virginia Beach, Virginia, with his mother.

Following a memorial service held by friends in Dallas, his ashes were cremated and scattered in the Chesapeake Bay to join his brother.

== Filmography ==
=== Film ===
| Year | Title | Role | Notes |
|---|---|---|---|
| 1985 | The Young & the Hung | Country Boy | Debut |
| 1985 | The Other Side Of Aspen II | Chris | |
| 1985 | Flip-Flop Fuckers | Chris | |
| 1985 | Inch By Inch | Christopher | |
| 1986 | Dynastud | Steven Harrington | |
| 1987 | Road Thrill | Bobby | |
| 1989 | Solo Studs 2 | Chris | |
| 1990 | Auto Erotica: The Best of Sex in Cars | Christopher | |
| 1990 | Glory Hole of Fame 1 | Bobby | |
| 1990 | Falcon Icons: The 1980s | Chris | |
| 1992 | All About Balls | Christopher | |
| 1993 | Ass Worship | Bobby | |
| 1994 | Eat A Dick Up Til You Hiccup | Chris | |
| 1995 | Catalina Blond | Chris | Posthumous release |
| 1997 | Rivers of Cum | Chris | Posthumous release |
| 2003 | Young Cum Pumpers | Chris | Posthumous release |
| 2005 | Road Thrill | Lance | Posthumous release |
| 2007 | Eat a Dick up til You Hiccup | Chris | Posthumous release |
| 2008 | Manhole Crews | Chris | Posthumous release |
| 2016 | All Male Jizz Jamboree | Christopher | Posthumous release |
| 2016 | Taking It Deep!: Falcon Bareback 30 | Christopher | Posthumous release |
| 2021 | Falcon Icons: The 1980s | Christopher Lance | Posthumous release |
