= Hugh Dillon Redemption Choir =

Canadian indie rock band

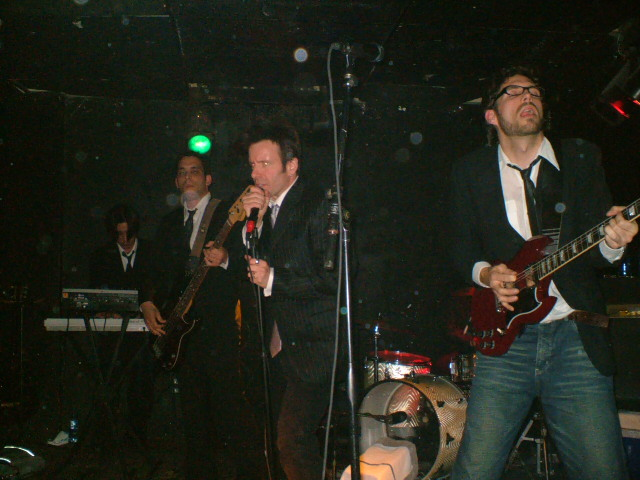
- The Hugh Dillon Redemption Choir, 2005

Background information
- Origin: Kingston, Ontario, Canada
- Genres: Indie rock
- Years active: 2004–present
- Labels: Ching Music
- Members: Hugh Dillon; J.P. Polsoni; Ben Kobayashi; Chris Osti; Derek Downham
- Website: thehdrc.com

The Hugh Dillon Redemption Choir is a Canadian indie rock band led by Hugh Dillon and based in Kingston, Ontario. The band's style draws from country, pop, punk, and new wave influences.

== History ==
Dillon formed the band in Kingston in 2004. Lead singer Dillon projected a less aggressive style in this band than in his previous group Headstones. That year the band released an album, The High Co$t of Low Living, through Paul Langois' Ching Music label. Two tracks from this album were included as extras in the DVD version of the dramatic series Durham County: Season 1.

The Redemption Choir performed in the Tragically Hip's Across the Causeway show. The band's members also performed behind Dillon on his solo album Works Well with Others in 2009, released through Paul Langois' Bathouse Studio.

== Band members ==
- Hugh Dillon – vocals (2004–present)
- J.P. Polsoni – guitar (2004–present)
- Ben Kobayashi – keyboards (2004–present)
- Chris Osti – bass (2004–present)
- Derek Downham – drums (2004–present)

== Discography ==
- The High Co$t of Low Living (2005)

== See also ==
- Music of Canada
- Canadian rock
- List of Canadian musicians
- Category:Canadian musical groups
