= Love Junk =

Studio album by the Pursuit of Happiness
- Released: October 26, 1988
- Recorded: July 1988
- Studios: Utopia Sound, Lake Hill, New York
- Genre: Pop rock
- Length: 43:07
- Label: Chrysalis
- Producer: Todd Rundgren

The Pursuit of Happiness chronology
Love Junk (1988)	One Sided Story (1990)

Singles from Love Junk
- 1. "She's So Young" Released: January 1989; 2. "Beautiful White" Released: April 1989; 3. "Hard to Laugh" Released: November 1989; 4. "I'm an Adult Now (re-recording)" Released: January 1990

Love Junk is the debut album by Canadian power pop band the Pursuit of Happiness, released in 1988. The album's biggest hit was "I'm an Adult Now", although "Hard to Laugh" and "She's So Young" were also notable singles in Canada. It is the most successful album by the band, being certified Platinum in Canada and selling 125,000 copies in the United States. Love Junk reached number 28 on the RPM Canadian Albums Chart in 1989. The album was the 12th best-selling Cancon album in Canada of 1989.

== Production ==
The album was produced by Todd Rundgren and was recorded at Rundgren's Utopia Sound Studios in Lake Hill, New York. According to Rundgren, "The record was completed in about 10 days, start to finish—so quickly that some band members thought there might be something wrong with it."

The 7-inch single for "She's So Young" contains a (non-album) B-side track called "Let My People Go" which was later released on the Sex and Food: The Best of TPOH compilation.

== 30th anniversary release ==
To celebrate the 30th anniversary of Love Junk, the band released a remastered deluxe edition of the album through Universal Music Group Canada in September 2018. The Love Junk Deluxe Edition included remastered versions of the original 13 tracks, plus 13 rare and previously unreleased tracks, and was made available in both 2CD and 2LP versions, with the 2CD digipak including a 24-page booklet and the 2LP edition housed in a triple gatefold and including a special LP-sized booklet. Both editions included new liner notes, with interviews from both current and former members. The booklet also included many photographs, some of which had never been seen before. In support of the release, the band played several dates in Canada in late 2018 and in 2019, performing Love Junk in its entirety followed by other favorites.

== Track listing ==
All songs written by Moe Berg.

1. "Hard to Laugh" (2:38)
2. "Ten Fingers" (2:53)
3. "I'm an Adult Now" (4:25)
4. "She's So Young" (3:34)
5. "Consciousness Raising as a Social Tool" (2:27)
6. "Walking in the Woods" (3:51)
7. "Beautiful White" (3:27)
8. "When the Sky Comes Falling Down" (3:25)
9. "Looking for Girls" (2:50)
10. "Man's Best Friend" (2:35)
11. "Tree of Knowledge" (3:50)
12. "Killed by Love" (4:01)
13. "Down on Him" (2:30), CD bonus track and appears on LP Chrysalis CJS-41675C

30th Anniversary Deluxe Edition

All songs written by Moe Berg except where indicated. In addition to remastered versions of the original 13 tracks (above), the Deluxe Edition includes the following songs on CD2 (on the LP version, songs 1-6 are on Side A; songs 7-13 are on Side B):

1. "I'm An Adult Now" (original 1986 version)
2. "Let My People Go" (B-side of the single for "She's So Young")
3. "Walking In The Woods" (demo of the song that would appear on the Love Junk album)
4. "Handsomest Man and Prettiest Girl" (previously unreleased; live)
5. "All That You Got Me For Christmas" (previously unreleased demo)
6. "Wake Up and Smell Cathy" (demo)
7. "Take You With Me" (from Love Junk sessions; previously unreleased)
8. "Shave Your Legs" (demo of the song that would appear on 1990's One Sided Story album)
9. "Master" (previously unreleased; live)
10. "She's So Young" (original 1986 version)
11. "Killed By Love" (original 1986 version)
12. "If You Feel That Way" (demo)
13. "Santa Clause Is Back In Town" (live; written by Jerry Leiber and Mike Stoller)

== Personnel ==
- Moe Berg – guitars, vocals
- Kris Abbott – guitars, vocals
- Dave Gilby – drums
- Johnny Sinclair – bass
- Leslie Stanwyck – vocals

== Charts ==
Chart performance for Love Junk
Chart (1989–1990)	Peak position
Australian Albums (ARIA)	88
Canada Top Albums/CDs (RPM)	28
