= Railway Club =

Coordinates: 49.2828817°N 123.1172426°W

Railway Stage & Beer Café was Vancouver’s longest continually operating nightclub, occupying the same premises uninterrupted from 1931 to 2016, with a brief re-opening from the winter of 2022 until the spring of 2023. Three rooms made up the second floor space at the corner of Seymour and Dunsmuir Street. The first was a small room that hosted music seven nights a week. The second was a pub-style space, and the third retained its 1930s look, with brass fittings and a large wooden bar.

== History ==
The club opened in 1932 as "The 7 Railwayman's Club". In the 1930s, the Railway Club limited its membership to the railway workers who worked at the CPR Station (now the Seabus Terminal) down Seymour Street at the waterfront; it later opened up to the general public.

Over the years the 'Rail' hosted many upcoming and local bands as well as some big touring acts. This is where k.d. lang came to public attention, and Spirit of the West got their start here as well. Other bands who have played the Railway include Los Lobos, The Rheostatics, The Tragically Hip, local icons Mud River, Blue Rodeo, Hard Rock Miners, Barenaked Ladies, Yummy Devils, Grapes of Wrath, Great Big Sea and thousands more.

The Railway Club was closed in 2016, but in April 2017 reopened under new ownership as the Railway Stage & Beer Cafe.

After a brief re-opening in 2022, the venue closed again in 2023 and has remained closed since.
