= Love + Fury =

Studio album by Headstones
- Released: May 14, 2013
- Recorded: Noble Street Studios – Toronto, Ontario
- Genre: Rock
- Length: 33:00
- Label: Frostbyte Media Inc.
- Producers: Hugh Dillon, Chris Osti

Headstones chronology
The Oracle of Hi-Fi (2002)	Love + Fury (2013)	Little Army (2017)

Singles from Love + Fury
- 1. "Bin This Way for Years" Released: 2011; 2. "Long Way to Neverland" Released: 2013; 3. "Far Away from Here" Released: 2013

Love + Fury is the sixth studio album by Canadian rock band, Headstones. It was the band's first album released after their hiatus. At a length of 33 minutes, it is the band's shortest album to date. The album was nominated for "Rock Album of the Year" at the 2014 Juno Awards.

== Background ==
After a 7 year long hiatus, the Headstones reformed in 2011. The band's first new song to be released was "Bin This Way for Years", which was released on the band's website on August 15, 2011. The band released a music video for the song on October 28, 2011. The band announced the recording of their new album on October 18, 2012, and that the album would be funded by pledges from fans through PledgeMusic. On March 22, 2013, the entire album was made available to stream on PledgeMusic exclusively for pledgers of the album. The album's next single, "Long Way to Neverland", debuted on radio on March 28. The single was released as a digital download on April 16.

== Commercial performance ==
The album debuted at No. 7 on the Canadian Albums Chart. This is the highest position ever for a Headstones album on that chart. In its first week, the album sold 4,000 copies.

== Track listing ==
All songs written by Headstones except where noted. Song titles are stylized on the album without spaces, capitalization or punctuation.

No.	Title	Length
1.	"Change My Ways"	3:37
2.	"Long Way to Neverland"	2:59
3.	"Final Analysis" (Hugh Dillon, Chris Osti)	3:08
4.	"Far Away from Here"	3:26
5.	"Don't Follow the Leader"	3:01
6.	"Astronaught" (Osa Campbell, Dillon)	2:34
7.	"Go Back the Other Way"	2:32
8.	"SOS" (Stig Anderson, Benny Andersson, Björn Ulvaeus)	2:11
9.	"Bin This Way for Years"	2:41
10.	"Outta My League"	2:12
11.	"Midnight of This Life" (Dillon, Osti)	4:40
Total length:		33:00

== Personnel ==
- Hugh Dillon – vocals, harmonica
- Trent Carr – guitar, backup vocals
- Tim White – bass
- Dale Harrison – drums

=== Additional musicians ===
- Steve Carr – piano (on "Long Way to Neverland" and "Midnight of This Life")
- Osa Campbell – guitar (on "Astronaught")
- Devin Robertson – additional background vocals (on "Change My Ways")
- Vince Male – additional background vocals (on "Change My Ways")
