= American Whiskey Bar =

1998 Canadian television film

- Genre: Drama
- Written by: Michael Turner; Noel S. Baker
- Directed by: Bruce McDonald
- Starring: James Allodi; Kelly Harms; Leila Johnson; Daniel Kash; Chris Leavins; Stephen McHattie; Joe Pingue
- Theme music composer: Bob Wiseman
- Country of origin: Canada
- Original language: English

Production
- Producer: Carolynne Bell
- Running time: 90 minutes
- Production companies: Shadow Shows; Bellwood Stories

Original release
- Network: Citytv
- Release: September 19, 1998

American Whiskey Bar is a Canadian television film, which was broadcast by Citytv in 1998. The film was directed by Bruce McDonald as an adaptation of the novel by Michael Turner.

The novel is an experimental metafiction which mixes the screenplay for an imaginary film with the commentary of a film director, a film critic and a fictionalized version of Turner himself around the difficulties of getting it produced as a film; the screenplay portions depict the random interactions and conversations of various patrons in a bar, including a group of garbagemen who want to produce a film, a group of secretaries discussing their sex lives, and a gay couple. For the film, McDonald presented it as a "pirate" production of the screenplay in support of the fictional Turner's campaign to publicize it.

The cast included James Allodi, Kelly Harms, Leila Johnson, Daniel Kash, Chris Leavins, Stephen McHattie and Joe Pingue.

The film was broadcast live from the street-level "storefont" studio in the CHUM-City Building, so that passers-by on the street could watch the production unfold through the windows, and was intentionally scheduled to take place during the 1998 Toronto International Film Festival. It aired in a late-night time slot due to the sensitive and adult nature of some of its dialogue, which was not censored despite being a television broadcast.

It was also later rebroadcast on Bravo.

== Critical response ==
Kate Taylor of The Globe and Mail placed the broadcast in the context of both the long-abandoned practice of staging television drama live in the early days of television, and CHUM-City's established history of "casual, relatively unmediated television". She also contrasted it with David Wellington's 1996 film adaptation of Long Day's Journey into Night, which was essentially a filmed version of a stage production.

== Awards ==
McHattie received a Gemini Award nomination for Best Lead Actor in a Television Film or Miniseries at the 14th Gemini Awards in 1999.
