= Railway Club (disambiguation) =

Railway Club may refer to:

- Railway Club, the oldest continuously operating nightclub in Vancouver, Canada
- Cambridge University Railway Club
- Norwegian Railway Club, an association involved in the preservation of Norwegian museum railways

== See also ==
- National Association of Railway Clubs, an association of sports and social clubs in England, Scotland and Wales
- List of model railroad clubs
