= List of Show Me Yours episodes =

This is a list of episodes of the Canadian sitcom Show Me Yours. The series debuted on Showcase on May 26, 2004 and ended May 31, 2005.

No.	Title	Directed by	Written by	Original release date
1	"Pilot"	John Fawcett	Noel S. Baker; Shelley Eriksen	May 26, 2004
Feeling overwhelmed by her clients' demands, sex therapist Kate Langford takes a sabbatical to write a book. But when, at a party, her publisher Toni Bane notices the chemistry she has with rugged biologist Ben Chase, just returned from field work on monkey mating rituals in Africa, she coerces them into co-writing a "he said/she said" book about sex."
2	"If You Can't Take the Heat"	John Fawcett	Jennifer Cowan	June 2, 2004
Coming off as too meek in comparison with Ben with their first interviewee, Kate determines to assert herself in the partnership, but only succeeds in starting a competition between Ben and her boyfriend David.
3	"In Sex We Trust"	Unknown	Unknown	June 9, 2004
When David leaves on a three-month documentary shoot, Kate succumbs to the temptation to explore new erotic areas by accepting an invitation to a sex party.
4	"War & Peace"	John Fawcett	Karen Hill	June 16, 2004
Although Toni encourages Kate and Ben to become more involved with each other to liven up the book, both are aware of the dangers of a romance between co-workers, particularly when Kate's former flame Marshall and Ben's ex-wife Simone both happen to show up.
5	"The Following Game"	Unknown	Noel S. Baker	June 23, 2004
Fantasizing alternately about a handsome stranger and ex-flame Marshall, Kate is ready to fly down to Mexico to join her boyfriend David, but is forestalled by an important interview Toni has arranged for Kate and Ben with Vanity Fair magazine.
6	"Sexual Healing"	Unknown	Barry Stevens	June 30, 2004
When Ben finds himself thinking about Kate while he is in bed with Toni, he wants to know if he'd have a chance with Kate if David weren't in the picture. Kate, in turn, is wondering if infidelity is such a bad thing, after her best friend Jodi confesses to it.
7	"It's My Party"	Unknown	Unknown	July 7, 2004
Pressured by David for a decision on buying a condo together, Kate ends up breaking up with him and throws a party to celebrate. But with Marshall and the Handsome Stranger still in the picture, she is not ready to commit to Ben either.
8	"I Confess"	Unknown	Unknown	July 14, 2004
Forced to hole up for a weekend to do a last-minute rewrite on their book, Kate and Ben are also forced to straighten out their mixed-up love lives.
9	"Big in France"	Paul Fox	Shelley Eriksen	April 12, 2005
Kate decides to marry David, and Ben heads back to Africa.
10	"On the Other Hand"	Unknown	Unknown	April 19, 2005
Kate faces dilemmas in both her personal and professional life. She and David try to plan their wedding, but don't seem to be on the same page. Kate then makes a deal with David to co-write a book with him, then receives an offer to write the sequel to 'The Erotic Instinct' with Ben.
11	"Let Go, My Ego"	Unknown	Unknown	April 26, 2005
Kate decides to be spontaneous, opting to skip the big wedding and just marry David right away.
12	"The Intentional Phalluss-Y"	Unknown	Unknown	May 3, 2005
Ben's bachelor days may be coming to a close.
13	"Best Foot Forward"	Unknown	Unknown	May 10, 2005
Ben and Kate switch roles.
14	"The F-word"	Unknown	Unknown	May 17, 2005
Ben decides to move in with Olivia.
15	"Pandora's Box"	Unknown	Unknown	May 24, 2005
Ben and Olivia celebrate their new life as a couple, while Kate decides to take her relationship with Dr. Goldman to the next level.
16	"Plus Ca Change"	Unknown	Unknown	May 31, 2005
Ben takes Kate as his date to his ex-girlfriends wedding.
