= The Pursuit of Happiness (band) =

Canadian rock band

- Origin: Ontario, Canada
- Genres: Alternative rock; power pop; college rock
- Years active: 1985–present
- Labels: Chrysalis; Mercury; Iron
- Spinoffs: Universal Honey; Trans-Canada Highwaymen
- Members: Moe Berg; Dave Gilby; Kris Abbott; Brad Barker; Renee Suchy
- Past members: Tamara Amabile; Natasha Amabile; Johnny Sinclair; Leslie Stanwyck; Susan Murumets; Jennifer Foster; Rachel Oldfield
- Website: tpoh.net

The Pursuit of Happiness (TPOH) are a Canadian rock and power pop band best known for their song "I'm an Adult Now".

== Beginnings ==
Led by Edmonton, Alberta, frontman Moe Berg, The Pursuit of Happiness were launched in 1985 when he and drummer Dave Gilby moved to Ontario. They soon met bassist Johnny Sinclair and formed the band, adding sisters Tamara and Natasha Amabile as backing vocalists. Their debut single, "I'm an Adult Now", quickly became a smash hit across Canada in 1986, sparked by a low-budget video (made by Berg's director friend Nelu Ghiran) which made it onto the Canadian music video channel MuchMusic.

The band signed with manager Jeff Rogers (Swell) in 1986. The band did not immediately sign to a record label, but instead released another independent single, "Killed by Love", in 1988. The Amabile sisters left to concentrate on their own band, and were replaced by Kris Abbott (guitar and backing vocals) and Leslie Stanwyck (backing vocals) in early 1988.

== Chrysalis Records ==
In 1988, they signed to Chrysalis Records. Their debut album, Love Junk, was produced by Todd Rundgren and released that year. "I'm an Adult Now" was re-recorded and re-released as a single, making it to the charts a second time. In January 1989 the song peaked at No. 6 on Billboard's alternative songs chart. It was followed by "She's So Young", which became their biggest hit single in Canada and also received radio play in the UK and became a minor hit there, and "Hard To Laugh". The album sold over 100,000 copies in Canada and was certified platinum.

The band's follow-up album with Rundgren, 1990's One Sided Story, featured the hit singles "New Language" and "Two Girls in One." Although the album did not sell as well as Love Junk it was still a significant hit for the band.

Stanwyck and Sinclair left the band in early 1990, going on to form power pop band Universal Honey. Starting with the Spring 1990 tour for One Sided Story, Brad Barker (bass) and Susan Murumets (backing vocals) joined the lineup. Murumets left the band in 1992 in order to pursue the business side of music, and was replaced by Rachel Oldfield.

== Mercury Records, then Iron Music ==
The band then went through difficulties with Chrysalis, and eventually followed Chrysalis president Mike Bone to Mercury Records in 1992, and released The Downward Road in 1993. Despite some success with the single "Cigarette Dangles" (the video appeared on Beavis and Butt-head), more label troubles ensued, and the band recorded their next two albums for the now-defunct Canadian label Iron Music. Oldfield left the band in 1995, and was replaced by Jennifer Foster, who in turn left the following year and was replaced by Renee Suchy.

== Canadian Indies Hall of Fame, reunion shows, recent Canadian tour dates ==
Although the group never officially disbanded, after 1996 they did not record as a unit until 2005, when they recorded two new tracks for a greatest hits compilation. The most recent lineup has played a few concerts over the last decade, including in a series of shows over the last week of 2005 which ended with a New Year's Eve concert in London, Ontario. In March 2006, they were inducted into the Canadian Indies Hall of Fame.

The band reunited for the Q107 Jingle Ball on 13 December 2014, at the Phoenix Concert Theatre in Toronto, and at the Horseshoe Tavern in Toronto on 27 October 2017 as part of the Horseshoe's 70th anniversary series of shows.

To celebrate the 30th anniversary of Love Junk's release, in September 2018 the band released a deluxe edition, featuring remastered versions of Love Junk's 13 tunes, and a 13 additional unreleased, live, and other rare recordings. To support the deluxe album's release the band played several dates in Canada in late 2018 and in 2019, where they would play Love Junk in its entirety, along with several other favourites. As of 2025, the band continues to play selected festivals, events, and other dates.

== Current members ==
- Moe Berg – lead vocals, lead guitar, songwriting (1985–present)
- Dave Gilby – drums (1985–present)
- Kris Abbott – guitar, backing vocals (1988–present)
- Brad Barker – bass, occasional live backing vocals (1990–present)
- Renee Suchy – backing vocals, live percussion (1996–present)

== Former members ==
- Johnny Sinclair - bass, backing vocals (1985–1990)
- Tam Amabile - backing vocals (1985–1988)
- Tasha Amabile - backing vocals (1985–1988)
- Leslie Stanwyck - backing vocals (1988–1990)
- Susan Murumets - backing vocals (touring only, 1990–1991)
- Rachel Oldfield - backing vocals (1992–1995)
- Jennifer Foster - backing vocals (1995–1996)

== Discography ==
=== Albums ===
Year	Title	Peak chart positions		Certifications
Year	Title	CAN	AUS	Certifications
1988	Love Junk	28	88	MC: Platinum
1990	One Sided Story	18	112	MC: Gold
1993	The Downward Road	36	148	
1995	Where's the Bone	—	165	
1996	The Wonderful World of The Pursuit of Happiness	—	—	
2000	Sex and Food: The Best of TPOH	—	—	
2005	When We Ruled: The Best of The Pursuit of Happiness	—	—	

=== Singles ===
Release date	Title	Chart positions					
Release date	Title	CAN	CAN Content (Cancon)	AUS	US Main	US Mod	Album
September 1986	"I'm an Adult Now" (original recording)	35	7	—	—	—	Non-LP singles both later re-recorded for Love Junk
February 1988	"Killed By Love"	—	—	—	—	—	Non-LP singles both later re-recorded for Love Junk
January 1989	"She's So Young"	20	4	—	—	—	Love Junk
April 1989	"Beautiful White"	47	9	—	—	—	Love Junk
November 1989	"Hard To Laugh"	55	—	—	—	—	Love Junk
January 1990	"I'm an Adult Now" (re-recording)	—	—	39	22	6	Love Junk
May 1990	"Two Girls in One"	30	—	—	—	—	One Sided Story
August 1990	"New Language"	42	—	—	—	—	One Sided Story
November 1990	"Food"	—	8	—	—	—	One Sided Story
February 1993	"Cigarette Dangles"	51	—	—	—	—	The Downward Road
May 1993	"I'm Ashamed of Myself"	—	4	—	—	—	The Downward Road
May 1993	"Pressing Lips"	—	—	—	—	—	The Downward Road
July 1995	"Young And in Love"	77	—	—	—	—	Where's the Bone
August 1995	"Gretzky Rocks"	—	—	—	—	—	Where's the Bone
January 1996	"Kalendar"	—	—	—	—	—	Where's the Bone
April 1996	"I Should Know"	35	—	—	—	—	Where's the Bone
September 1996	"She's The Devil"	56	—	—	—	—	The Wonderful World of The Pursuit of Happiness
January 1997	"Carmalina"	52	—	—	—	—	The Wonderful World of The Pursuit of Happiness
October 2005	"When Doves Cry"	—	—	—	—	—	When We Ruled: The Best of The Pursuit of Happiness

== Featured on ==
- Beavis and Butt-Head season 2, episode 7 "Customers Suck" - "Cigarette Dangles" (music video)
