= One Sided Story =

Studio album by The Pursuit of Happiness
- Released: May 1990
- Recorded: November 1989, Utopia Sound Studios, Lake Hill, New York
- Genre: Rock
- Length: 38:55
- Label: Chrysalis VK-41757
- Producer: Todd Rundgren

The Pursuit of Happiness chronology
Love Junk (1988)	One Sided Story (1990)	The Downward Road (1993)

One Sided Story is the second album by Canadian power pop band The Pursuit of Happiness, released in 1990. It was recorded over a two-and-a-half week span in November 1989.

After having been on the road nearly non-stop following Love Junk's success, band leader Moe Berg wrote all of the material for One Sided Story in just four months, completing the last songs just hours before the band started recording for the album.

Just after finishing recording the album, original bass player Johnny Sinclair and backup singer Leslie Stanwyck left the band in order to pursue their own project (which would eventually become Universal Honey). After approximately three weeks of auditions, Sinclair and Stanwyck were replaced by Brad Barker on bass and Susan Murumets on backing vocals. Muruments stuck around only for the tour to support the album, leaving to concentrate on her own musical career, whereas Barker has remained with the band ever since.

== Commercial performance ==
One Sided Story peaked at #18 on the RPM Canadian Albums Chart. The album was the 12th best selling Cancon album in Canada of 1990. The album was certified Gold in Canada.

Professional ratings
Review scores
Source	Rating
Allmusic	link
Trouser Press	(unfavourable) link
Select	4/5

== Track listing ==
All songs written by Moe Berg

1. "Food" (2:31)
2. "Two Girls in One" (2:35)
3. "New Language" (2:42)
4. "Something Physical" (3:06)
5. "One Thing" (2:58)
6. "No Safe Place" (3:10)
7. "Shave Your Legs" (2:49)
8. "Runs in the Family" (3:04)
9. "All I Want" (4:48)
10. "Forbidden Fruit" (3:16)
11. "Little Platoons (My Neighbourhood)" (2:51)
12. "Survival" (5:05)

== Personnel ==
- Moe Berg – guitar, vocals
- Kris Abbott – vocals, guitar
- Dave Gilby – drums
- Johnny Sinclair – bass
- Leslie Stanwyck – vocals, acoustic guitar
- Gary Windo – saxophone (12)

== Charts ==
Chart (1990)	Peak position
Australian Albums (ARIA)	112
Canadian Albums (Billboard)	18
