= The Oracle of Hi-Fi =

Studio album by Headstones
- Released: October 22nd 2002
- Genre: Alternative rock, hard rock
- Length: 43:03
- Label: Maple Music
- Producer: Colin Cripps

Headstones chronology
Nickels for Your Nightmares (2000)	The Oracle of Hi-Fi (2002)	Love + Fury (2013)

The Oracle of Hi-Fi is the fifth studio album by Canadian rock band Headstones. It was released in 2002 under Maple Music.

== Background ==
In an interview with Q, Headstones lead singer Hugh Dillon said that The Oracle of Hi-Fi was his first attempt on making an album after getting sober. At the time of recording, the band wanted to create an album that was focused instead of going in multiple directions compared to their previous studio album, Nickels for Your Nightmares.

== Production ==
In the production of The Oracle of Hi-Fi, Headstones used Pro Tools for recording and RADAR for mixing. Most of the band's performances on the album was digitally layered, with the exception of the live track "Coffee Cup".

== Track listing ==
No.	Title	Length
1.	"Whatchagonnado"	2:53
2.	"Reframed (Every Single Failure)"	3:57
3.	"Take It"	2:28
4.	"Nothing Changes"	3:40
5.	"And It Goes"	2:25
6.	"Tiny Teddy"	3:12
7.	"Vanished"	3:47
8.	"Coffee Cup"	4:57
9.	"She Just Wants to Cry"	3:55
10.	"Million $ Moment"	2:35
11.	"Devil's Road"	9:14
Total length:		43:03

== Reception ==
Professional ratings
Review scores
Source	Rating
Melodic	3/5 stars
Hour Community	4/5 stars

Critics had differing opinions of the music and lyrics on The Oracle of Hi-Fi. Melodic Net said the album would satisfy listeners with the band's "pure party music" while Chartattack said the album was "safe and pedestrian".

While reviewing the lyrics of The Oracle of Hi-Fi, Hour Community believed that multiple songs on the album were very graphic. Nevertheless, Ground Control Magazine felt that the album was put together from previous songs the band had already written.
