= The Downward Road =

Studio album by The Pursuit of Happiness
- Released: March 1993
- Recorded: March 30 – June 19, 1992 at Sound City, Los Angeles, California
- Genre: Rock
- Length: 51:43
- Label: Mercury
- Producer: Ed Stasium

The Pursuit of Happiness chronology
One Sided Story (1990)	The Downward Road (1993)	Where's the Bone (1995)

Professional ratings
Review scores
Source	Rating
Allmusic	3/5 stars

The Downward Road is the third album by Canadian power pop band The Pursuit of Happiness, released in 1993. The album peaked at #36 on the RPM Canadian Albums Chart. The album cover has several versions with different coloured backgrounds (red, blue, yellow and others).

For the recording of The Downward Road, the band spent nearly three months in Los Angeles under the direction of producer Ed Stasium. The recording process marked a departure from the band's first two albums, Love Junk and One Sided Story, which were recorded in ten days and two and a half weeks, respectively, at Todd Rundgren's Utopia Sound Studios in Lake Hill, New York. Berg explained the difference in recording processes: "We did the first record with Todd (Rundgren) in three weeks. Whereas the record we did with Ed almost took three months. That was the first difference. The second was that Todd really went for the live thing. We all played together, and everything went down at the same time live, except for the vocals and guitar solos. Ed, on the other hand, is more conventional. That sounds odd ... but the way records are made now is the way Ed makes them, with more sweating on the details."

The two-and-a-half-year interval between the release of The Downward Road and the band's previous effort, One Sided Story, was due to several factors, including the band's changing labels from Chrysalis to Mercury, waiting for producer Stasium to become available, and - finally - Mercury's shelving of the album for six months so it could be released in the new year.

== Track listing ==
All songs written by Moe Berg, except as noted.

1. "Downward Road (Intro)" (0:26) (Roebuck Staples)
2. "Cigarette Dangles" (2:32)
3. "Nobody But Me" (3:20)
4. "I'm Ashamed of Myself" (3:48)
5. "Pressing Lips" (3:33)
6. "In Her Dreams" (3:18)
7. "Downward Road" (Revisited)" (3:12)
8. "Heavy Metal Tears" (2:31)
9. "Bored of You" (3:18)
10. "Love Theme from TPOH" (3:29)
11. "Forbidden World" (4:03)
12. "But I Do" (4:23)
13. "Crashing Down" (3:47)
14. "Honeytime" (3:08)
15. "Villa in Portugal" (3:28) (Berg, Jules Shear)
16. "Terrified" (3:16)

== Personnel ==
- Moe Berg - guitar, vocals
- Kris Abbott - vocals, guitar
- Brad Barker - bass
- Dave Gilby - drums

Additional musicians

- Paul McCandless - oboe solo (12)
- Rachel Oldfield - vocals
- Todd Rundgren - guitar solo (10)
- Ed Stasium - percussion

== Charts ==
Chart (1993)	Peak position
Australian Albums (ARIA)	148
Canadian Albums (RPM)	36
