= Show Me Yours =

Canadian comedy television series

- Genre: Comedy
- Created by: Paul Jay; Noel S. Baker; Shelley Eriksen (showrunner)
- Written by: Noel S. Baker; Shelley Eriksen; Karen Hill; Karen McClellan; Jennifer Cowan; Barry Stevens
- Directed by: T. W. Peacocke; Paul Fox; John Fawcett
- Starring: Rachael Crawford; Jeff Seymour; Adam Harrington
- Theme music composer: James Jandrisch
- Country of origin: Canada
- Original language: English
- No. of seasons: 2
- No. of episodes: 16 (list of episodes)

Production
- Executive producers: Laszlo Barna; Paul Jay; Shelley Eriksen
- Producer: Norman Denver
- Cinematography: Steve Cosens; Kim Derko
- Editor: David B. Thompson
- Running time: 30 minutes

Original release
- Network: Showcase
- Release: May 26, 2004 – May 31, 2005

Show Me Yours is a Canadian comedy television series that originally aired on Showcase between May 26, 2004 and May 31, 2005.

== Plot ==
Dr. Kate Langford (Rachael Crawford) is a psychologist whose life is going well: she has a boyfriend David Exley (Jeff Seymour), and a new book deal until she meets Dr. Benjamin Chase (Adam Harrington).

== Broadcast information ==
The show aired in Canada on Showcase and in the United States on the Oxygen Network.

== Home media ==
Entertainment One released the entire series on DVD in Region 1 on November 10, 2009.
