= Smile and Wave =

Smile & Wave

Studio album by Headstones
- Released: May 6, 1997
- Recorded: Metalworks Studios, Mississauga, ON
- Genres: Alternative rock, hard rock
- Length: 60:57
- Label: MCA
- Producers: Brad "Merlin" Nelson, Headstones

Headstones chronology
Teeth and Tissue (1995)	Smile & Wave (1997)	Nickels for Your Nightmares (2000)

Smile & Wave is the third album by Canadian rock band Headstones. The album featured the singles "Cubically Contained", "Smile & Wave", "And" and "Without a Sound". It was certified Gold in Canada, and sold 100,000 copies by April 2000.

== Track listing ==
No.	Title	Length
1.	"Reno"	3:24
2.	"Smile & Wave"	4:08
3.	"And"	4:06
4.	"Picture Frame of Rage"	2:38
5.	"Cubically Contained"	4:36
6.	"Cut Me Up"	2:44
7.	"Digits"	3:28
8.	"Do That Thing"	2:57
9.	"Pretty Little Death Song"	3:30
10.	"Supersmart"	3:15
11.	"Without a Sound"	3:51
12.	"Nerve"	3:23
13.	"Physics"	18:57
Total length:		60:57

There are several hidden tracks following "Physics", including "Anything" as well as some recorded antics.

== Awards and certifications ==
In 1997, Smile & Wave was certified gold by Music Canada. The following year, the album was nominated for Blockbuster Rock Album of the Year at the Juno Awards of 1998.

== Chart performance ==
Chart (1998)	Peak position
Canada Top Albums/CDs (RPM)	36

== Reception ==
Professional ratings
Review scores
Source	Rating
Calgary Herald	4.5/5
Edmonton Journal	3/5 stars

Critics gave differing opinions on the music and lyrics of Smile & Wave. When reviewing the album's music, the Calgary Herald said the album went for the "rock jugular from start to finish", though the Toronto Star called the Headstones' work "a murky, steaming cauldron of pungent rock 'n' roll".

Alternatively, reviewers gave mixed reviews for Hugh Dillon's performance. The Edmonton Journal said Dillon's personality was better than his singing, while the Ottawa Journal felt that Dillon's sarcastic lyrics were almost too much for the album.
