= Inch by Inch (film) =

1985 film by Matt Sterling

- Box art for 1985 VHS release, also used for DVD release
- Directed by: Matt Sterling
- Written by: Matt Sterling
- Produced by: Matt Sterling
- Starring: Jeff Quinn; Doug Jensen; Tom Brock
- Cinematography: Nick Eliot; Doug Williams
- Edited by: Paul James
- Production company: Huge Video
- Distributed by: Falcon Studios (DVD)
- Release date: 1985 (United States)
- Running time: 64 minutes
- Country: United States
- Language: English

Inch by Inch is a 1985 gay pornographic film, directed, written, and produced by Matt Sterling, cinematographed by Nick Eliot and Doug Williams, edited by Paul James, and starring Jeff Quinn, Doug Jensen and Tom Brock with Mark Miller, Jim Pulver, Mike Raymond, Steve Wright, Tony Stefano, Steve Henson, Toby Matson, Chris Lance, Kevin Luken and Bill Joseph. The runtime is 64 minutes, and DVD copies have been distributed by the Falcon Studios. The film contains sequences in the order of appearance: a man seducing each of two trespassers in his apartment, a foursome on the rooftop, a threesome fantasy, a window voyeurism, and the subway scene.

== Plot ==
Tony Stefano finds Steve Henson and Mike Raymond trespassing his apartment and seduces each of them respectively. Afterwards, Tony then goes to his bed and then fantasizes a threesome scene. Meanwhile, Mark Miller, Chris Lance, Bill Joseph, and Kevin Luken are engaging an orgy on the rooftop of the apartment building. In the next scenario, Mike Raymond voyeurs at Tom Brock by the window, and they then engage each other. In the last scenario, Jim Pulver and Jeff Quinn hook each other up in an empty subway car. The film ends with Tom Brock entering the subway and the following text: "The non-stop excitement continues.... [with Tom Brock ...going all the way] (Note: This bracketed phrase actually appears in the film.) in the next Matt Sterling film, coming February 1986".

Scenes

- Apartment trespassing: Tony Stefano, Steve Henson, and Mike Raymond
- Rooftop: Mark Miller, Chris Lance, Bill Joseph, and Kevin Luken
- Tony Stefano masturbating and fantasizing: Steve Wright, Doug Jensen, and Toby Matson
- Window voyeurism: Mike Raymond and Tom Brock
- Subway: Jim Pulver and Jeff Quinn

== Reception ==
Keeneye Reeves rated this film three out of four stars, called it a "hot 'n sleazy pre-condom fun that's worth seeing twice", and praised the sex scenes, yet Reeves criticized the runtime as "short" and ending as "hokey".

The reviewer from Rad Video rated this movie four out of five stars and praised its sex scenes and male bodies but found its runtime too short. Mark Adnum from Outrate called this film "a masterpiece of gay porn packed with great sex and hot guys". Both reviewers found its ending a tease to an upcoming sequel that never happened.

In the book The Culture of Queers (2002), Richard Dyon called the subway scene a blend of "realism and 'classical cinema'". Dyon observed: the production setting of "the interior of subway carriage" appeared "clean" and less gritty than the actual interior of the subway, as the graffiti were "too legible and too appropriate to be true." Nevertheless, he found sex performances of the two men sexy, titillating, well shot and edited, and well-done signals of "abandonment and sexual hunger" as part of realism of anonymous sex.

Director Matt Sterling picked two scenes of this film as his favorites for the compilation of Matt Sterling's accomplishments, Best of All: the window voyeurism scene of Tom Brock and Mike Raymond, and the subway scene of Jim Pulver and Jeff Quinn.

In 1986, Inch by Inch won two Gay Producers Association Awards for the Best Video and Best Newcomer (Nick Eliot) and one Adam Film World award for the Gay Movie of the Year.

== Notes ==
Footnotes

Inline references

=== References ===
- Dyer, Richard. The Culture of Queers. London: Routledge—Taylor & Francis, 2002. Hardcover: ISBN 0-415-22375-X. Paperback: ISBN 0-415-22376-8.
