= Where's the Bone =

Studio album by The Pursuit of Happiness
- Released: 1995
- Recorded: 1995
- Genre: Rock
- Length: 41:18
- Label: Iron Music Group
- Producers: Moe Berg, Aubrey Winfield

The Pursuit of Happiness chronology
The Downward Road (1993)	Where's the Bone (1995)	The Wonderful World of The Pursuit of Happiness (1996)

Where's the Bone is the fourth album by the Canadian power pop band the Pursuit of Happiness, released in 1995. The first single was "Young and in Love", which is about Generation X; "Kalendar" was also released as a single. The band supported the album with a Canadian tour.

== Production ==
The album was produced by the band's singer/guitarist/songwriter Moe Berg and Iron Music Group's founder, Aubrey Winfield. Berg made an effort to write songs with lyrics that weren't solely about him.

== Critical reception ==
Professional ratings
Review scores
Source	Rating
AllMusic	3/5 stars
Calgary Herald	D

The Globe and Mail concluded that "it's probably the band's most entertaining and satisfying album and certainly the first to fully reflect Berg's twisted sense of humour." The Calgary Herald noted that "while songwriters like Paul Westerberg and Cracker's David Lowry deliver their social commentary with subtlety, Berg beats you over the head and begs to be taken seriously."

The Vancouver Sun panned "the dreadful blues-plod" of "I Should Know". The Record wrote that the "lyrics aim for high satire ... but repeatedly miss, too often forsaking irony in favor of far less effective poses like outrage and self-pity."

AllMusic deemed the album a "blend of crunching arena rock and tuneful power-pop."

== Track listing ==
All songs written by Moe Berg

1. "Kalendar" (1:57)
2. "Save the Whales" (3:40)
3. "Glamorous Death" (3:58)
4. "White Man" (2:35)
5. "I Should Know" (2:50)
6. "Completely Conspicuous" (3:08)
7. "Ritual" (3:38)
8. "Young and in Love" (3:20)
9. "Gretzky Rocks" (1:55)
10. "No Reason" (3:03)
11. "Bamboo" (2:50)
12. "Falling In" (2:19)
13. "Blowing Bubbles" (5:20)

== Personnel ==
- Moe Berg – guitar, vocals
- Kris Abbott – vocals, guitar
- Dave Gilby – drums, percussion
- Rachel Oldfield – vocals
- Brad Barker – bass

Additional musicians

- Sarah McElcheran – trumpet
- Brian Leonard – percussion
- Vilas Kulkarni – sitar
- Raya Briday – harmonium
- Ravi Naimpally – tablas
- Ben Grossman – oud

== Charts ==
Chart (1995)	Peak position
Australian Albums (ARIA)	165
