= Hard Rock Miners =

Canadian musical group

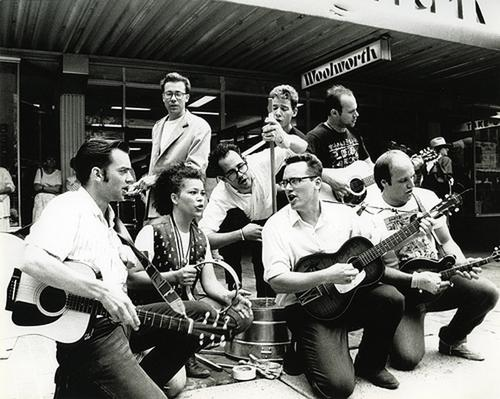
- HRM busking in Calgary, Alberta (circa 1989)

Background information
- Origin: Vancouver, British Columbia, Canada
- Genres: Rockabilly/hillbilly/country/folk
- Years active: 1987–
- Labels: Epic/Sony Music Canada
- Past members: Michael Phillips, Scooter Johnson, Oliver Metson, Ingrid Mary Percy, Michael Turner, Peter Carr, Bill Ryan

The Hard Rock Miners are a Canadian rockabilly/hillbilly/country/folk band based in Vancouver, British Columbia. Despite their name, they did not perform hard rock music.

== History ==
In 1987, members of The Hard Rock Miners started out busking on the streets of Vancouver, particularly on trendy Robson Street in the city's Downtown West End. Their music could be best described as eclectic. As they moved to gigs at Vancouver venues, their instrumentation included acoustic and electric guitars, banjo, fiddle, washtub bass, washboard, tambourine, harmonica, and drums amongst others. This essentially electrified bluegrass lineup played standards, including "Pistol Packin' Mama", the Brothers Johnson's "Get The Funk Out of My Face", Nancy Sinatra's "These Boots Were Made For Walkin'", "Rock Island Line", "Wabash Cannonball", and speedy punked up and humorous versions of other country and western, funk, punk, and pop classics.

The band was officially formed in 1987. The original members were singer and guitarist Michael Phillips, bassist and vocalist Scooter Johnson, vocalist Oliver Metson who also played the washboard, singer Ingrid Mary Percy, singer Michael Turner on guitar and banjo, percussionists and singers Peter Carr, and Bill Ryan.

== Later developments ==
Michael Phillips moved to Toronto and co-founded the "motorgrass" band Jughead. He later left Jughead, moving to Muskoka and later Huntsville, Ontario. He now performs and records under the name The Mighty Lopez.

Turner later became an author, penning several books, including Hard Core Logo, which was about his experiences while fronting the band.

Carr went on to producing film and television including Gough Lewis's 1997 controversial Sundance Festival winner SEX: The Annabel Chong Story.

After retiring from the band in 1993, Ingrid Mary Percy completed a Diploma in Fine Art and Bachelor of Fine Arts (Studio) at Emily Carr University of Art and Design, Vancouver, British Columbia, and a Master of Fine Arts (Painting) at the University of Victoria, Victoria, British Columbia. Percy went on to become a contemporary Canadian visual artist and to teach visual art at the post-secondary level in Canada for 25 years.

For 15 years, Ingrid lived and worked in Corner Brook, Newfoundland and Labrador, where she was Associate Professor in Visual Arts at the School of Fine Arts, Grenfell Campus, Memorial University as well as a practicing artist.

In September 2022, Banff Centre for Arts and Creativity announced Ingrid Mary Percy as its new Director of Visual Arts Residencies. In this role, Percy is responsible for overseeing all programming and residencies within the Visual Arts realm at the Centre.

Percy is also involved in arts advocacy and served as president of Canadian Artists' Representation/Le Front des artistes canadiens (CARFAC), the national voice of Canada's professional visual artists, based in Ottawa, Ontario, Canada.

In 1991, Carr and Johnson opened a comic, cult video and cappuccino bar called Pop Media Culture. The store featured independent press comics, fanzines and cult videos. The store also served as a hub for up and coming bands who would perform at their "make rent" parties. Turner and Percy left the band in 1993.

The band performed several cross-Canada tours, both headlining and opening for international acts such as The Proclaimers, Country Dick Montana, The Pixies, D. O. A., The Pogues and continued to perform with fluctuating membership. All of the band's original members eventually left; replacing them over the years have been long time stalwarts Rob Thomson (guitar / vocals), Ike Eidsness (drums) and Paul Gould (mandolin / banjo), as well as Keith Rose (Roots Roundup), Ford Pier (SNFU, D.O.A.) and Linda McRae (Spirit of the West). The band also features guitarist and fiddler Sexy Pierre Lumoncel (Nyetz, The Beauticians), who joined the band in 1990 and toured and recorded with the band throughout.

In 2017, the Georgia Straight named The Final Frontier (1992 Sony/Epic) one of "The 50 albums that shaped Vancouver" in the past 50 years.

The Hard Rock Miners performed frequently at Vancouver's Railway Club; in later years, the band hosted a monthly singalong there. Currently, the band performs very energetic and successful sing-along events and upon request for music industry functions and charity events.

== Discography ==
- Making The Bedrock (cassette) 1989
- Play City Billy (cassette) 1990
- The Final Frontier 1992 (Einstein Bros./Epic/Sony Music Canada)
- Rock 'n Roll Welfare 1995 (Hypnotic/A&M Records)
