= Noel S. Baker =

Canadian screenwriter

Noel S. Baker is a Canadian film and television screenwriter. He is most noted for the 1996 film Hard Core Logo, for which he was a Genie Award nominee for Best Adapted Screenplay at the 17th Genie Awards in 1996, and won the prize for Best Canadian Screenplay at the 1996 Vancouver International Film Festival.

The following year he published the book Hard Core Roadshow: A Screenwriter's Diary, his own diaries of his experiences working on the film.

His other credits have included the films Platinum, American Whiskey Bar and We Forgot to Break Up, and episodes of the television series Drop the Beat, Show Me Yours and At the Hotel.
