= Universal Honey =

Canadian power pop band

- Origin: Canada
- Genres: Power pop, Pop rock, Rock
- Years active: 1992–present
- Spinoff of: The Pursuit of Happiness
- Members: Johnny Sinclair; Leslie Stanwyck

Universal Honey is a Canadian power pop band. The band released seven albums.

== History ==
The group was formed in 1992 by bassist Johnny Sinclair and singer/guitarist Leslie Stanwyck, both formerly of The Pursuit of Happiness. They were joined by guitarist Simon Craig and Tim Timleck on drums. Their first album, Magic Basement, was released in 1993.

Universal Honey toured extensively as an opening act for Duran Duran and the Goo Goo Dolls. The band also opened for The Heads at the NXNE festival.

The band had moderate radio success in Canada in 1996 with the single "Any Road Back" from their album Earth Moon Transit, which was played on MTV2.

In 2004, Universal Honey released their seventh album, Vicious Circles.

After a hiatus, Universal Honey released their eighth album, Dandelion, in 2023.

== Discography ==
- Magic Basement (1993)
- Earth Moon Transit (1996)
- Universal Honey (1999)
- Fearless (2001)
- Invincible (2002)
- Can't Stop Thinking About Christmas (2003)
- Vicious Circles (2004)
- Dandelion (2023)
