= Michael Turner (musician) =

Canadian writer

- Born: 1962 (age 63–64); North Vancouver, British Columbia
- Occupations: Musician, and writer of poetry, prose and opera librettos

Michael Turner (born 1962 in North Vancouver, British Columbia) is a Canadian musician, and writer of poetry, prose and opera librettos. His writing is noted for including detailed and purposeful examination of ordinary things.

== Career ==
Turner was an original member of the Vancouver band Hard Rock Miners, formed in 1987, singing and playing guitar and banjo. The band toured across Canada and released four albums of rockabilly music. His 1993 book Hard Core Logo is about his experiences while fronting the band.

Turner wrote Company Town in 1991, and followed it with Hard Core Logo in 1993 and Kingsway in 1995. Turner employed multi-format and intertextual approaches in his works American Whiskey Bar (1997), and The Pornographer's Poem (1999).

In 1996, Bruce McDonald directed a film based on Hard Core Logo; he also directed a live telecast dramatizing Turner's novel American Whiskey Bar in 1998, which Citytv produced and aired. That year he founded the literary/visual art imprint Advance Editions, with Arsenal Pulp Press. In 1998, he appeared as the dance MC and announcer in the short film Elimination Dance, directed by McDonald with Don McKellar and Michael Ondaatje.

Turner's work was adapted to radio, stage, television and feature film, and he has been translated into French, German, Russian, and Korean. He won the Genie Award in 1996 for Music/Original Song, the 2000 Ethel Wilson Fiction Prize and was also a finalist for the 1992 Dorothy Livesay Poetry Prize.

Turner collaborated with artist Stan Douglas on two experimental-video screenplays, titled Journey into Fear (Istanbul Biennial, 2001) and Suspiria (Documenta XI, 2002) and on a screenplay with filmmaker Bruce LaBruce, titled Untitled Von Gloeden Project, based on the life and work of photographer Wilhelm Von Gloeden. He was commissioned to write a libretto for the Modern Baroque Opera Company, based on Wilhelm Busch's Max & Moritz.

Turner lives in Vancouver, writes art essays and edits Advance Editions.

== Bibliography ==
=== Poetry and fiction ===
- Company Town (Vancouver: Arsenal Pulp, 1991)
- Hard Core Logo (Vancouver: Arsenal Pulp, 1993)
- Kingsway (Vancouver: Arsenal Pulp, 1995)
- American Whiskey Bar (Vancouver: Arsenal Pulp, 1997)
- The Pornographer's Poem (Toronto: Doubleday Canada, 1999)
- 8x10 (Toronto: Doubleday Canada, 2009)
- 9x11 and other poems like Bird, Nine, x and Eleven (Vancouver: New Star Books, 2018)
- Playlist: a Profligacy of Your Least-Expected Poems (Vancouver: Anvil Press, 2024)

=== Anthologies (featured in) ===
- Lost Classics (Toronto: Knopf Canada, 2000)
- Story of a Nation (Toronto: Doubleday Canada, 2001)
- The Notebooks (Toronto: Anchor Canada, 2002)
- A Verse Map of Vancouver (Vancouver: Anvil Press, 2009)
