= Teeth and Tissue =

Studio album by Headstones
- Released: 1995
- Studios: Metalworks Studios, Mississauga, Ontario
- Genres: Alternative rock, hard rock
- Length: 48:14
- Label: MCA
- Producer: Glen Robinson

Headstones chronology
Picture of Health (1993)	Teeth and Tissue (1995)	Smile and Wave (1997)

Professional ratings
Review scores
Source	Rating
Allmusic	favorable

Teeth and Tissue is the second studio album by Canadian rock band Headstones.

== Track listing ==
No.	Title	Length
1.	"Hindsight"	3:58
2.	"Unsound"	3:32
3.	"Marigold"	5:13
4.	"Hearts, Love & Honour"	4:49
5.	"Million Days in May"	3:59
6.	"Dripping Dime Sized Drops"	5:12
7.	"Swinging"	2:32
8.	"Let It Go"	2:46
9.	"Say Goodbye"	2:20
10.	"Burning"	3:16
11.	"Look Away"	2:37
12.	"Teeth & Tissue"	4:11
13.	"One More Move"	3:49
Total length:		48:14

== Nominations ==
At the Juno Awards of 1996, Teeth and Tissue was nominated for Best Rock Album.

== Certifications ==
On June 13, 1997, Teeth and Tissue was certified gold by Music Canada.

== Chart performance ==
Chart (1996)	Peak position
Canada Top Albums/CDs (RPM)	62
