= The High Co$t of Low Living =

Studio album by Hugh Dillon Redemption Choir
- Released: June 13, 2005
- Genre: Rock and roll
- Label: Ching Music (indie)
- Producer: Paul Langlois

The High Co$t of Low Living is the debut album by the Hugh Dillon Redemption Choir. It was released in 2005 on MapleMusic. A number of songs appear on Dillon's 2009 solo album, Works Well with Others.

== Track listing ==
1. "Surface of the Sun"
2. "Number on the Wall"
3. "Radio Plays"
4. "Microscope"
5. "What It Takes"
6. "Well on Your Way"
7. "My Mistakes"
8. "Gods Have Spoken"
9. "Sentimental Me"
10. "Ten Feet Tall"
11. "Puzzle I Am"
12. "Inch by Inch"
13. "Mannequins" (bonus track)
