= Tweeter and the Monkey Man =

Song by Traveling Wilburys

from the album Traveling Wilburys Vol. 1
- Released: October 18, 1988
- Recorded: May 1988
- Genre: Heartland rock, folk rock
- Length: 5:27
- Label: Wilbury
- Songwriter: Traveling Wilburys
- Producers: Otis Wilbury, Nelson Wilbury

"Tweeter and the Monkey Man" is a song by the British-American supergroup Traveling Wilburys that first appeared on the 1988 album Traveling Wilburys Vol. 1.

== Background ==
Although the official songwriting credit is given to all members of the band, it is thought that Bob Dylan is the main songwriter because he sings lead vocals and published the song under his Special Rider Music label. However, this is partially contradicted by George Harrison's account of the song in the 2007 documentary The True History of the Traveling Wilburys:

"Tweeter and the Monkey Man" was really [written by] Tom Petty and Bob [Dylan]. Well, Jeff [Lynne] and I were there too, but they were just sitting there around in the kitchen, and he was for some reason talking about all this stuff that didn't make much sense to me, you know, Americana kind of stuff, and we got a tape cassette and put it on and then transcribed everything they were saying.

Harrison also recalled that he and Lynne then contributed the chorus, beginning with the line "And the walls came down", based on an idea of Dylan's from the same tape.

"Tweeter and the Monkey Man" is sometimes regarded as a playful homage to the songs of Bruce Springsteen, who was often hailed as "the next Dylan" early in his career. The lyrics include the titles of Springsteen songs, and the song borrows many of Springsteen's themes. The setting of the song itself is New Jersey, Springsteen's home state and the setting for many of Springsteen's own songs. New Jersey locations such as Rahway Prison and Jersey City are mentioned by name. Springsteen song title references include: "Stolen Car", "Mansion on the Hill", "Thunder Road", "State Trooper", "Factory", "The River", and a song made popular by Springsteen but written by Tom Waits, "Jersey Girl". Additionally, "Lion's Den" and "Paradise" are each mentioned and prominently enunciated in the song, each being the title of a Springsteen song released after the Traveling Wilburys album.

Only Dylan, Harrison, Petty and Lynne took part in recording "Tweeter and the Monkey Man," making it the only song on Vol. 1 not to feature Roy Orbison in any capacity.

== Composition and lyrical content ==
"Tweeter and the Monkey Man" contains five verses in 5 minutes 27 seconds, making it the longest Traveling Wilburys song put to record. Dylan sings lead on the song's verses, with the rest of the group (except Orbison) singing backup on the chorus.

The song tells the story of two drug dealers – Tweeter and the Monkey Man – their nemesis, the "Undercover Cop", and the cop's sister, Jan, a longtime love interest of the Monkey Man. Some lyrics raise a question regarding Tweeter's gender identity, for example: "Tweeter was a boy scout / before she went to Vietnam ..." Later in the song, Jan is quoted as saying of Tweeter, "I knew him long before he ever became a Jersey girl."

Throughout the ballad, the demise of Tweeter, the Monkeyman and the Undercover Cop, as well as Jan's fate, are examined.

== Personnel ==
The Traveling Wilburys

- Bob Dylan – lead vocals, acoustic guitar, backing vocals
- George Harrison – acoustic guitar, Dobro, slide guitar, backing vocals
- Jeff Lynne – acoustic guitar, bass guitar, keyboards, backing vocals
- Tom Petty – acoustic guitar, backing vocals

Additional musicians

- Jim Keltner – drums
- Jim Horn – saxophones
- Ray Cooper – percussion

== Cover versions ==
Canadian rock band Headstones recorded a cover of the song for their 1993 debut album Picture of Health. It was released as the album's third single in 1994 and became a radio hit in Canada. The lyrics were changed somewhat, including eliminating the implication of Tweeter changing genders and replacing some American references with Canadian ones, such as the inclusion of the band's hometown of Kingston.

Tom Petty and the Heartbreakers performed a cover of the song several times in 2013, including the Beacon Theatre on May 20, the Bonnaroo Music & Arts Festival on June 14, and the Firefly Music Festival (Dover, DE) on June 22. The performance from the Beacon appears on the group's digital album Live 2013.

P. Paul Fenech (the Meteors) covered this song on his solo album International Super Bastard in 2010.

Freek de Jonge recorded a version in Dutch on his 2002 album Parlando, under the title "Libelle en mug".
