= Nickels for Your Nightmares =

Studio album by Headstones
- Released: May 9, 2000
- Genres: Alternative rock, hard rock
- Length: 50:32
- Label: MCA
- Producer: Paul Northfield

Headstones chronology
Smile and Wave (1997)	Nickels for Your Nightmares (2000)	The Oracle of Hi-Fi (2002)

Nickels for Your Nightmares is the fourth album by the Canadian rock band Headstones. The album featured the hit singles "Settle" and "Blonde & Blue", which reached #4 and #8 on Canada's Rock chart, respectively. By June 2000, the album had sold 30,000 copies, performing less well than the three previous albums.

== Track listing ==
No.	Title	Length
1.	"Downtown"	3:17
2.	"Pinned You Down"	1:55
3.	"Settle"	4:04
4.	"Exhausted"	4:06
5.	"Blonde & Blue"	3:47
6.	"Pathetic Pair"	2:07
7.	"Firing Pin"	2:53
8.	"Mystery to Me"	3:07
9.	"Above Ground Swimming Pools"	4:17
10.	"Fuck You"	2:40
11.	"My Perspective Fades"	3:08
12.	"Ultra-Honesty"	3:43
13.	"Little Lies"	4:16
14.	"Nickels For Your Nightmares"	7:12
Total length:		50:32

== Chart performance ==
Chart (2000)	Peak position
Canada Top Albums/CDs (RPM)	34
