= Hard Core Logo =

- Directed by: Bruce McDonald
- Screenplay by: Noel S. Baker
- Based on: Hard Core Logo by Michael Turner
- Produced by: Brian Dennis; Christine Haebler
- Starring: Hugh Dillon; Callum Keith Rennie; John Pyper-Ferguson; Bernie Coulson
- Cinematography: Danny Nowak
- Edited by: Reginald Harkema
- Music by: Schaun Tozer; Patric Caird; Michael Turner; Hugh Dillon; Swamp Baby
- Production companies: Terminal City Pictures; Shadow Shows; Ed Festus Productions; Téléfilm Canada; British Columbia Film; TiMe Medienvertriebs GmbH; CITY-TV; Everest Pictures Inc.
- Distributed by: Cineplex Odeon Films
- Release dates: May 1996 (Cannes); October 25, 1996 (Canada)
- Running time: 92 minutes
- Country: Canada
- Language: English

Hard Core Logo is a 1996 Canadian music mockumentary film directed by Bruce McDonald, adapted by Noel S. Baker from the novel of the same name by Michael Turner. The film illustrates the self-destruction of punk rock, documenting a once-popular band, the titular Hard Core Logo, comprising lead singer Joe Dick (Hugh Dillon), fame-tempted guitarist Billy Tallent (Callum Keith Rennie), schizophrenic bass player John Oxenberger (John Pyper-Ferguson), and drummer Pipefitter (Bernie Coulson). Julian Richings plays Bucky Haight, Dick's idol. Several notable punk musicians, including Art Bergmann, Joey Shithead and Joey Ramone, play themselves in cameos. Canadian television personality Terry David Mulligan also has a cameo, playing a fictionalized version of himself.

The film premiered at the 1996 Cannes Film Festival. It received widespread critical acclaim, and was nominated for six Genie Awards, including Best Motion Picture and Best Director. In a 2001 poll of 200 industry voters, performed by Playback, Hard Core Logo was named the fourth best Canadian film of the last 15 years. In 2002, readers of Playback voted it the 4th greatest Canadian film ever made.

A sequel, Hard Core Logo 2, was released in 2010.

== Plot ==
The film is about a documentary team that follows the reunion of Hard Core Logo, a once-popular punk rock band. Frontman Joe Dick gets the band back together, ostensibly for an anti-gun benefit after hearing Canadian punk legend and personal mentor Bucky Haight, has been shot. They begin the tour in Vancouver and travel thousands of kilometers east along the Trans-Canada Highway to Winnipeg, then northwest along the Yellowhead Highway to Edmonton.

On the way, the band's dark secrets are revealed; however, while they travel, they keep ignoring each other's darkness. Bassist John Oxenberger loses his schizophrenia medication and slowly loses his sanity. Guitarist Billy Tallent finds out that by going on tour he loses his position in mainstream American rock band Jenifur and with that his one shot at stardom.

The band stops by Bucky Haight's reclusive estate only to find he was never shot and that Joe fabricated the lie in order to get the band together. The band and documentary crew drop acid and experience hallucinations. Bucky severs ties with Joe for using him to get the band together.

At Edmonton, Tallent finds out he has another opportunity to permanently join Jenifur. Joe finds out from the film crew and later attacks Billy on stage. Dick destroys Tallent's Fender Stratocaster, which was a gift from Haight, and the band parts ways.

In the final scene Joe Dick drinks with the documentary crew members, then suddenly shoots himself in the head.

== Cast ==
- Hugh Dillon as Joe Dick
- Callum Keith Rennie as Billy Tallent
- John Pyper-Ferguson as John Oxenberger
- Bernie Coulson as Pipefitter
- Julian Richings as Bucky Haight
- Benita Ha as Pipefitter's Girlfriend
- Claudia Ferri as John Oxenberger's Girlfriend
- Joey Ramone as Himself
- Corrine Koslo as Laura Cromartie
- Bruce McDonald as Himself (director)
- Danny Nowak as Himself (camera operator)
- Jochen A. Schliessler as Himself (sound recordist)
- Art Bergmann as Himself
- Terry David Mulligan as Mulligan, booking agent
- Joey Shithead as Himself
- Nicole N. Parker as A Music Writer
- Megan Leitch as Mary, the Fan
- Michael Kopsa as Mary's Husband
- Alexa Mardon as Little Billie Tallent
- Molly Parker as Jenifur Member (uncredited)

== Production ==
McDonald grew up in the Vancouver punk rock scene in the late 1970s and early 1980s and was drawn to Michael Turner's book about aging musicians. McDonald commented in an interview, "what I thought was really interesting is where it is 15 years later, and what are these guys doing now". He had just come off the critically acclaimed Dance Me Outside and friends warned him not to repeat himself by making another road movie. However, McDonald did not see Logo as a repeat of previous films: "On the other films, they (the anti-heroes of Roadkill and Highway 61) go down the road and meet a nutty person and things happened. Here you're with the same people throughout – and they are the nutty people!"

McDonald had to persuade Dillon to do the film: "He was going 'Wow, what if the movie is shit, then I'd lose all my fans from the band, I'd lose all my credibility!'" The director auditioned 200 actors for the role but kept coming back to the musician. Dillon remembers, "as soon as he gave me freedom to make the screenplay more believable, I became interested. Bruce allowed me creative input and that's what made it a special piece for me". Dillon drew a lot on his own real life experiences of being in a band.

The music of the fictional band was all written by Michael Turner, arranged and produced by Peter J. Moore, and performed by Hugh Dillon and the band Swamp Baby.

== Soundtrack ==
Although music figures heavily in the film, a conventional soundtrack album was not initially released; instead, McDonald had several notable Canadian bands record covers of the songs in the film, and packaged them as if they were a tribute album to a real band. That album, A Tribute to Hard Core Logo, was also released in 1996.

A more traditional soundtrack album, comprising the actual music contained in the film itself, was released later in 1998 on Velvel Records.

=== Track listing ===
Lyrics by Michael Turner and music by Hugh Dillon and Swamp Baby, except where noted:

1. "Who the Hell Do You Think You Are?" (2:54)
2. "Rock & Roll Is Fat and Ugly" (1:57)
3. "Something's Gonna Die Tonight" (3:17)
4. "Blue Tattoo" (3:14)
5. "Sonic Reducer" (2:54) (Dead Boys cover)
6. "Edmonton Block Heater" (3:00)
7. "China White (Ten Buck Fuck)" (4:45)
8. "One Foot in the Gutter" - (1:52) (The Ugly cover)
9. "Hawaii" (1:37) - (Young Canadians cover)
10. "Bonerack" (3:35) - Teenage Head
11. "Touring" (2:52) - Ramones
12. "Wild Wild Women" (3:19) - Chris Spedding

== Reception ==
Hard Core Logo screened at the Cannes Film Festival. McDonald remembers, "Cannes was very humbling. You're in the same arena as Bernardo Bertolucci and Czechoslovakian pornographers. It's such a bizarre spectrum". The film went on to be nominated for six Genie Awards, including Best Picture and Director. Quentin Tarantino saw Logo at a film festival and liked it so much that he bought the U.S. distribution rights under his Rolling Thunder label and even toyed with casting Dillon in Jackie Brown.

=== Critical reception ===
Hard Core Logo was well received by Canadian film critics. In his review for the Toronto Sun, Bruce Kirkland praised the cast: "They're all so convincing it is impossible to believe they're not all the real thing". John Griffin, in his review for the Montreal Gazette, called it "a masterful exercise in edgy virtuoso film craft, subversive propaganda and exhilarating entertainment". In his review for the Toronto Star, Peter Goddard praised Noel Baker's screenplay for providing "some of the funniest and deftest writing Canadian moviemaking has heard in years but it can't hide the bitter-sweetness just below the surface". Liam Lacey in his review for The Globe and Mail wrote: "Though the jumpy, parodic, disruptive style suits rock music, the same techniques prevent viewers from investing deeply in the characters and the story. The ride is fun, but it doesn't quite reach a destination".

The film received general favorable review from American film critics. Entertainment Weekly gave it a "B−" rating and Owen Gleiberman wrote: "Most of the characters are too goofy to register. Still, there are times when Dillon's performance lays bare why, for sheer style, burning out will always have the edge over fading away". In his review for the San Francisco Chronicle, Peter Stack wrote: "Director Bruce McDonald (Dance Me Outside) has turned out a tight, fascinating on-the-road rock movie, a delicious study in mean-spiritedness as well as the gut imperatives that make punk music the unsettling, hostile experience it is". Stephen Holden, in his review for The New York Times felt that "unlike Spinal Tap, which cast a comically jaundiced eye on every nuance of the heavy-metal life style, this clever mock documentary ... blends satire and sentiment in a way that keeps you emotionally off balance".

=== Awards and nominations ===
The film won the Genie Award for Best Original Song for the track "Who the Hell Do You Think You Are?", and was nominated for five other awards including Best Picture and Best Director.

It took the Best Canadian Feature at the Sudbury Cinéfest. At the Vancouver International Film Festival, it received the $10,000 CITY-TV award for Best Canadian Film and Noel Baker won the Rogers Prize for Best Canadian Screenplay.

== Legacy ==
In a 2001 poll of 200 industry voters, performed by Playback, Hard Core Logo was named the second best Canadian film of the last 15 years. In 2002, readers of Playback voted it the 4th greatest Canadian film ever made.

The character Billy Tallent, portrayed by Callum Keith Rennie, was the inspiration for the name of the Canadian band Billy Talent.

McDonald asked Daniel MacIvor to write a My Dinner with Andre-style screenplay that would be a sequel to Hard Core Logo, with Hugh Dillon and Callum Keith Rennie playing the roles, but scheduling (among other reasons) kept it from moving forward. After some discussion, McDonald and MacIvor decided to rewrite the screenplay for two women, with Molly Parker and Tracy Wright in mind. The film was released in 2010 as Trigger. Rennie has a cameo in the film, reprising his role as Billy Tallent.

== Sequel ==
A sequel film, Hard Core Logo 2, was released in 2010. Bruce McDonald returned to direct and write the screenplay. The film centers on the real-life band Die Mannequin. McDonald and Julian Richings are the only returning cast members from the first film.

The sequel premiered at the Whistler Film Festival on December 4, 2010 with the members of Die Mannequin and McDonald walking the red carpet. It had its second screening at the Victoria Film Festival on February 6, 2011. It received mixed reviews.
