= Moe Berg (musician) =

Canadian musician (born 1959)

- Born: Murray Kevin Berg; March 22, 1959 (age 67); Edmonton, Alberta, Canada
- Genres: Rock
- Occupations: Musician; songwriter; record producer
- Instruments: Vocals; guitar
- Years active: 1980–present
- Member of: The Pursuit of Happiness

Murray Kevin "Moe" Berg (born March 22, 1959) is a Canadian singer, guitarist, songwriter, and record producer best known as the frontman of the Pursuit of Happiness.

== Biography ==
Before forming the Pursuit of Happiness, Berg was in the Edmonton bands Troc '59, the News, Modern Minds and Facecrime.

After working with The Pursuit of Happiness for ten years, Berg released his first solo album, Summer's Over, in 1997. He has also produced a number of records for other artists. He currently plays rhythm in the 1980s cover band "Monteforte".

Berg has been published as a writer, releasing his first book, a short story collection called The Green Room, in 2000 (Gutter Press, ISBN 1-896356-32-X). He has also written book reviews for Amazon.ca, the Edmonton Journal, The Globe and Mail, among articles for other publications.

He currently works mainly as a record producer for young bands such as The Cliks.

In 2009, Berg began co-hosting a television show, Master Tracks, on Aux. The show is a documentary look at the recording process of emerging bands attempting to record a song in one day in a professional recording studio.

Berg also works as a professor teaching music production for the Music Industry Arts Program at Fanshawe College in London, Ontario.

Berg is the cousin of Edmonton radio host Rob Berg from Edmonton classic rock station K97.

Berg lives in Toronto, Ontario with his wife Laura and his two children, daughter Fireese and son Hartford.

Since 2016 Berg has toured Canada as part of the supergroup Trans-Canada Highwaymen with Chris Murphy (Sloan), Steven Page (Barenaked Ladies) and Craig Northey (Odds). Their debut album "Explosive Hits Vol. 1" was released in 2023.

== Articles ==
- Berg, Moe (November 7, 2004). "Words of wisdom from a grizzled rocker". Edmonton Journal. p. D12. Book review of For Those About To Rock by Dave Bidini
- Berg, Moe (March 17, 2001). "Poetically hip". The Globe and Mail. p. D2. Book review of Coke Machine Glow by Gordon Downie
