= Direct to Disc (FM album) =

Studio album by FM
- Released: May 1978
- Recorded: 1977
- Studios: Phase One Recording Studios, Toronto
- Genre: Progressive rock
- Length: 31:00
- Label: Labyrinth
- Producer: Paul A. Gross

FM chronology
Black Noise (1977)	Direct to Disc (1978)	Surveillance (1979)

Direct to Disc is the second album by FM, a progressive rock group from Toronto, Ontario, Canada, recorded late 1977 and released May 1978. It was also issued under the title Head Room. It was the first FM album to feature Ben Mink, who replaced founding member Nash the Slash on electric violin and electric mandolin, instruments which Nash also played.

It has been re-released for the first time in CD format on Esoteric Records in February 2013.

== Recording ==
The album was made using the direct to disc recording method, in which recording tape is not used. This method requires that the group perform two 15-minute sides live in the studio with no overdubs. The recording is mixed live and transcribed to the master disc as it is being performed. This was a briefly popular format in the 1970s, and like all albums made this way, it was a limited edition, because only so many copies can be pressed from the master disc.

The album was mostly instrumental, consisted of one piece on each side, and was issued on a small label called Labyrinth Records, catalogue number LBR-1001, which suggests it was likely the label's first (and possibly only) release. It was well received by critics who compared the first side to a blend of Yes, King Crimson, and Lighthouse, while the second side took on a jazz feel, concluding with the sound of an unusual instrument: an alpha wave brain monitor plugged into a synthesizer, translating drummer Martin Deller's live brainwaves into a throbbing hum.

== Artwork ==
The fantasy cover art by Paul Till shows a warrior (possibly from the distant past, or the distant future, and possibly female) gazing into a portal and seeing a green glowing vacuum tube in the foreground, superimposed over the warrior's face. The concept references the album's use of older, but not obsolete, and (arguably) superior recording technologies: tube amplifiers, and the direct to disc recording process.

== Editions and Head Room reissue ==
During the recording session, six takes were recorded for each side. The original edition uses take four on each side. The take number is determined by checking the side number suffix in the matrix numbers inscribed next to the run-out groove. Suffixes A4 and B4 indicate take four. This version was a limited edition of 20,000 copies.

Some time after the original edition's release (possibly in 1980), several reissues appeared. One still has the original Direct to Disc title, but it has a different company name on the label: Kiras Music Works. Another edition changes the album title to Head Room, or perhaps Headroom. The title, which is also the title of the piece covering side one, is spelled as one word on the main track list printed on the inner gatefold cover, but as two words in the engineering credits and on the first edition's cream coloured label. (The Kiras edition's label is also cream coloured.) Conversely, it is spelled as two words on the front cover of the later edition, but as one word on its black label, which has no label name. All editions continue to use the Labyrinth Records name and original catalogue number on the cover.

These later editions use different takes of the track for side two. Takes one and two (marked B1 and B2 in the matrix area) are known to exist. In an interview, Martin Deller suggested the later editions were not known to the band at the time:

"As far as the Direct to Disc goes there was a limited pressing of 20,000 copies and it sold out. However a local fan has collected a couple of copies of the album and I understand that they have different versions of each take (side 1, side 2) on them! I have yet to check this out but if so there may be more (than the 20K) available."

– Martin Deller, January 2004

The "local fan" Deller referred to is Brett Maraldo a.k.a. Plexus, who later formed the live show Psychedelitron with Nash the Slash. Plexus discovered the Direct to Disc variations in around 1984 and brought it to the band's attention. At the time, the band didn't know other takes had been released.

The claim that alternate takes of side one exist has not been confirmed, but the quote suggests Deller was uncertain of the details.

A remastered edition of Direct to Disc was released by Esoteric Records (ECLECM2377) on February 25, 2013.

== Track listing ==
Descriptions are taken from the track list on the album cover. Timings are taken from the first edition's label, which uses take four of each side. Later editions have alternate takes of side two, and timings are not shown on the labels.

=== Side one ===
1. "Headroom" (Cameron Hawkins) – 15:36
  - "Tyra" – An introduction of the three musicians with bass guitar, bass pedals, drums and electric violin.
  - "Reflections One" – A violin piece with light percussion, congas, bass guitar chording and bass pedals.
  - "Reflections Two" – The same themes as "One", presented over a background of sequences, string synthesizer, and drums with violin, vocal, and synthesizer melodies.
  - "Real Time" – A space out.
  - "Scarberia" – The drum solo emerges into an improvised synthesized drum, violin, bass guitar bridge. The piece concludes with a rock and roll song in 14/8.

=== Side two ===
1. "Border Crossing" (Martin Deller) – 15:24 – A composition drawing from rock, jazz, and classical influences.
  - "The First Movement" – was inspired by Japanese haiku; a three line verse having a rhythmic cadence of 5/7/5.
  - "The Second Movement" – is free of metre and tonal centre, and contrasts the first movement with a lack of structure.
  - "The Third Movement" – is introduced by an ostinato sequencer bass line. An improvisation by all players over this pattern follows.
  - "The Fourth Movement" – is in traditional song form with drums, violin, bass guitar and bass pedals. The piece concludes with added synthesizer environments of modulated noise and alpha brain wave control of an ARP 2500.

== Personnel ==
- Cameron Hawkins – Minimoog synthesizer with Polyfusion sequencer 2040, Micromoog synthesizer with Polyfusion sequencer AS-1, Micromoog synthesizer with percussion controller, Elka string synthesizer with bass pedals, Eko bass pedals, Rickenbacker bass guitar, Maestro Brassmaster fuzz, Mu-tron 111 filter, vocals
- Ben Mink – 5 string electric violin, 5 string solid body electric mandolin
- Martin Deller – Fibes drum kit, congas, bells and miscellaneous percussion, Moog percussion controller, ARP 2600 and ARP 2500 synthesizers
