= Con-Test =

Studio album by FM
- Released: 1985
- Genres: Pop rock, synthpop, progressive rock
- Length: 38:12
- Labels: Quality, MCA, Duke Street
- Producer: Michael Waite

FM chronology
City of Fear (1980)	Con-Test (1985)	Tonight (1987)

Con-Test is the fifth album by FM, a progressive rock band from Toronto, Canada, released in 1985.

== Background ==
In 1983, former group member Nash the Slash proposed a future double bill tour with FM, as the two artists seemed to share a common audience. FM's best known previous album was Black Noise which he made with them in 1977. But they had not yet found a replacement for Ben Mink who had replaced Nash in 1977, and then left the group in 1983. Nash resolved the problem by rejoining the band, although work on a new album, even in its demo phase, did not begin until May 1984. Con-Test has the same band line-up as Black Noise.

FM's former record company, Passport Records, ceased operations in 1984. Nash had been signed to Quality Records as a solo artist in 1983, and was about to release his solo album American Band-ages, which the proposed double bill tour was to promote. He was able to use his association with Quality to get FM signed to the label as well.

The double bill concept was retained, with Nash playing a solo set as the opening act for most FM concerts from 1983 to 1989.

Former group member Ben Mink also appears on the album, albeit as a guitarist.

== Title and artwork ==
The album was titled Con-Test after the group ran a contest to come up with something that "FM" might stand for, and its cover art featured fine print listing several hundred submissions including Fluent Monkeys, Flunk Math, Floyd Meddle, Fashion Magazine, Free Money, Forgiven Mistake, Facing Mecca, False Mammaries, and so on. (One intriguing entry is "Framed Mulroney" which would appear to reference the scandals surrounding then-Prime Minister Brian Mulroney; however, these incidents did not occur until years later.)

Despite the absence of pictorial graphics, the cover art was credited to surrealist painter Robert Vanderhorst, who has frequently collaborated with Nash the Slash on multi-media presentations from 1978 to the 2000s.

== Releases ==
The album was initially available on Quality Records in 1985 (catalogue number SV-2138), but the label ceased operations in 1986, after more than 35 years of business. They had been Canada's biggest domestic label in the 1950s and 1960s. The album reached number 56 on the Canadian charts.

MCA Records picked up the reissue rights for Con-Test, as well as Nash's American Band-ages in 1986, but the abrupt change in record labels led to a near-absence of promotion for both records.

Duke Street Records would release FM's next album, Tonight on vinyl and CD. This was FM's first CD release. The CD edition included five bonus tracks taken from Con-Test (tracks 1 to 4, and 6). This acquisition of the rights to Con-Test led to a CD edition of the full album on Duke Street in 1987, but Duke Street did not reissue it on vinyl.

== Track listing ==
All tracks composed by Cameron Hawkins, Martin Deller, and Nash the Slash—except where noted. All tracks arranged by FM and Michael Waite.

Side one

1. "Just Like You" (Hawkins, Deller, Slash, Waite) – 4:05 (#38 CAN)
2. "We Hold On" – 4:35
3. "All of the Dreams" – 4:05 (#86 CAN)
4. "Until the Night Is Over" – 3:50
5. "The Only Way to Win" – 3:46

Side two

1. "Why Don't You Take It" – 4:10 (#90 CAN)
2. "Distant Early Warning" – 4:08
3. "Friends and Neighbours" – 4:33
4. "Stop!" (Hawkins, Deller, Slash, Waite) – 5:00

== Personnel ==
- Nash the Slash – lead and background vocals, electric mandolin, electric violin, harmonica
- Cameron Hawkins – lead and background vocals, synthesizers, bass guitar
- Martin Deller – drums, electronic percussion

=== Guests ===
- Ben Mink – electric guitars
- Rob Yale – Fairlight C.M.I.
- Glen Johansen and David Moses – background vocals on "Distant Early Warning"

=== Technical credits ===
- Produced by Michael Waite for Eye to Ear Productions
- Bed tracks recorded at Manta Sound, engineered by John Naslin assisted by Ron Searls and Mark Baldi
- Overdubs recorded at Metal Works, engineered by Glen Johansen assisted by Noel Golden
- Mixed at Manta Sound, engineered by John Naslin assisted by Mark Baldi and Mike Duncan
- Mastered by Bob Ludwig at Masterdisk, New York City
- Robert Vanderhorst – cover art

== Singles ==
- "Just Like You" – 1985 (Canadian chart #38)
- "All of the Dreams" – 1986 (Canadian chart #86)
- "Why Don't You Take It" / "Just Like You" – MCA 52840, 1986 (issued with cover, Canadian chart #90)

The latter record was also issued as a 12-inch single on MCA 23634 with alternate versions:

- "Why Don't You Take It (Flight Mix)" (Hawkins, Deller, Slash) – total 6:27
  - "Intro (Taxi)" – 0:50
  - "The Tune (Take Off)" – 5:37
- "Just Like You (Fun Mix)" (Hawkins, Deller, Slash, Waite) – 7:06

== Demo recordings ==
Demo versions of four songs for Con-Test appeared on FM's Lost in Space CD on Cut-throat Records in 2001, recorded at Cut-throat Studios in May 1984. Cut-throat is Nash's own record company and studio. These include a cover version of "It's My Life", a song by The Animals from 1965, that did not make it to the album.

In the liner notes, Nash the Slash heavily criticizes the production of the Con-Test versions, preferring the demos. He states that he reluctantly took over the lead vocals from Hawkins on "Friends and Neighbours" between the demo and Con-Test versions, at the insistence of the producer (Waite), and characterizes the LP version of this song as "bastardized".

- "The Only Way to Win" (Hawkins, Deller, Slash) – 3:05
- "Friends and Neighbours" (Hawkins, Deller, Slash) – 4:03
- "It's My Life" (Roger Atkins, Carl D'Errico) – 3:20
- "Why Don't You Take It" (Hawkins, Deller, Slash) – 4:42
