= Tonight (FM album) =

Studio album by FM
- Released: 1987
- Studio: Mantra Sound Company
- Genre: Rock
- Length: 42:34 (LP), 63:10 (CD)
- Label: Duke Street
- Producer: Michael Waite

FM chronology
Con-Test (1985)	Tonight (1987)	RetroActive (1995)

Tonight is the sixth album by FM, a progressive rock group from Toronto, Ontario, Canada, released on Duke Street Records in 1987. It was their last studio album for 28 years. Further albums of live and demo material were issued between this period. It reached #87 on the Canadian charts, November 28, 1987

Two members of this version of the group did not appear on any other FM albums: Simon Brierley (ex Lee Aaron's band and Strange Advance) on guitars, and Greg Critchley (ex Portland Bros. and The Spoons) on drums, the latter replacing Martin Deller. Other lineups of FM were notable for not using electric guitars, therefore this change made a significant alteration to their sound.

== Singles ==
In 1986, prior to the album's release, "She Does What She Wants" was issued as a single on MCA, their previous label, which suggests Tonight was intended as an MCA release initially. "Good Vibrations" was issued privately as a single to members of the group's fan club. Other singles (on Duke Street) include "Dream Girl" backed with "The Real Thing" (1987), "Magic (In Your Eyes)" backed with "I'm Not Mad (Ready for the World)" (1988), and another release of "She Does What She Wants" backed with "She Does What She Wants (Front and Main Mix, A cappella version)". "Dream Girl" reached #41 and "Magic (In Your Eyes)" reached #52. Tonight was written because the girlfriend of one of the singers died in an airplane crash.

== Release ==
The album was first issued on green vinyl as a limited edition, followed by a black vinyl edition. A CD edition was also released. The CD is augmented by five tracks from FM's previous album, Con-Test. The acquisition of release rights for those tracks from MCA Records (who had reissued Con-Test in 1986, the original edition being on Quality Records in 1985) led to Duke Street reissuing the full album as a CD. Duke Street did not reissue another vinyl edition of that album.

Tonight includes a cover version of "Good Vibrations" by The Beach Boys. Five other songs from the album also appeared in the horror film Friday the 13th Part VII: The New Blood (1988): tracks 1, 2, 4, 6, 9.

The green vinyl edition came with a 6-inch by 4-inch sticker, and an order form for band paraphernalia (shirts, buttons, etc.) including fan club membership application. According to the form, members would receive a copy of a "Good Vibrations" single with a non-album instrumental version of the song on the B-side, not available elsewhere, as well as a poster and a quarterly newsletter subscription.

The cover art was a detail of a painting called "The Dreamer" by Robert Vanderhorst.

== Track listing ==
All tracks composed by Cameron Hawkins, Nash the Slash, Michael Waite, except where noted.

=== Side one ===
1. "Magic (In Your Eyes)" – 5:12
2. "Dream Girl" – 4:16
3. "She Does What She Wants" – 3:50
4. "I'm Not Mad (Ready for the World)" – 3:39
5. "Alone Together" – 4:55

=== Side two ===
1. "Take the Time to Dream" – 4:37
2. "Lost in Thought (When I Get Caught)" – 3:34
3. "Good Vibrations" (Brian Wilson, Mike Love) – 4:21
4. "The Real Thing" – 4:00
5. "(On the) Night Flight" – 4:40

=== Bonus tracks from CD edition ===
These tracks originally appeared on FM's previous album, Con-Test.

1. "Just Like You" (Hawkins, Martin Deller, Slash, Waite) – 4:06
2. "We Hold On" (Hawkins, Deller, Slash) – 4:37
3. "All of the Dreams" (Hawkins, Deller, Slash) – 4:09
4. "Until the Night is Over" (Hawkins, Deller, Slash) – 3:50
5. "Why Don't You Take It" (Hawkins, Deller, Slash) – 3:54

== Personnel ==
- Cameron Hawkins – lead and background vocals, keyboards, bass
- Nash the Slash – lead and background vocals, electric mandolin, harmonica, violin, bouzouki, mandola
- Simon Brierley – acoustic and electric guitars, background vocals
- Greg Critchley – drums, background vocals; lead vocal on "The Real Thing"
- Michael Waite – bass voices, background vocals

Personnel on bonus tracks

Technical

- Produced by Michael Waite for Eye-to-Ear Productions
- Recorded at Mantra Sound Company on the Mitsubishi 32 track X-850 recording system and mixed to the Mitsubishi X-80 digital two track
- Bed tracks engineered by John Naslen
- Overdubs engineered by Ron Searles
- Mix engineered by John Naslen
- Assistant engineer – Mark Baldi
- Mastered by Bob Ludwig at Masterdisk, New York City, USA
- Front cover and graphics – Robert Vanderhorst
- Photography – André Pierre Leduc
