= Cranford Hollow =

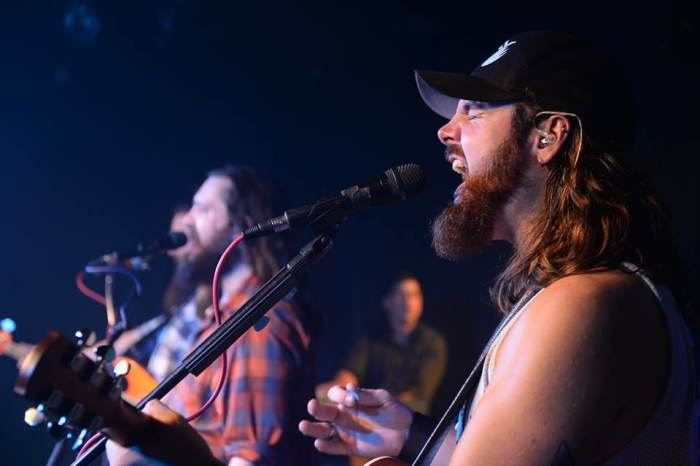
- Cranford Hollow live at Pour House, Charleston, South Carolina

Background information
- Origin: Hilton Head Island, South Carolina, United States
- Genres: Rock, Alternative Country
- Years active: 2011–present
- Label: Swampfire Records
- Members: John Cranford, Eric Reid, Yannie Reynecke, Phillip Sirmans, Randy Rockalotta
- Past members: Dallas Ackerman, Julius DeAngelis
- Website: www.cranfordhollowmusic.com

Cranford Hollow is an American Rock band from Hilton Head, South Carolina.

== History ==
Formed in 2011 as Cranford and Sons, the band consists of vocalist/guitarist John Cranford, bassist Phillip Sirmans, drummer Randy Rockalotta, and fiddler/vocalist Eric Reid. Cranford Hollow has released four albums to date, and is currently in the process of recording their fifth album.

Cranford Hollow recorded their first album as Cranford and Sons in the spring of 2012 at Retrophonics Studios in St. Augustine, Florida. The album, now known as The Crescent Beach Sessions, was engineered by Jim Devito and was released June 22, 2012.

In the spring of 2013, drummer Randy Rockalotta retired from the band and was replaced by newcomer Julius DeAngelis. At that time, the band decided to change its name due to similarity to the name of British folk group Mumford and Sons. The newly renamed Cranford Hollow recorded their eponymous sophomore album over the course of 2013 with producer Greg Critchley, formerly of FM (Canadian band). The album was mixed by Howard Willing, who engineered for the Smashing Pumpkins and The Wallflowers, and was mastered by Robert Vosgien at Capitol Records. Cranford Hollow was released on October 25, 2013.

In December 2013 the band embarked on its first national tour, playing markets such as Memphis, Tennessee, Denver, Colorado and Telluride, Colorado. The band began working on their third album, Spanish Moss and Smoke in the spring of 2014, returning to Retrophonics Studios with engineer Jim DeVito. The album was released on October 16, 2014. During the summer of 2014 the band again toured extensively throughout the Southeast and the West, reaching new markets such as Wichita, Kansas, Tupelo, Mississippi, and Taos, New Mexico. In September of that year, drummer Julius DeAngelis left the band and was replaced by Dallas Ackerman.

After the release of Spanish Moss and Smoke, Cranford Hollow toured the Midwest, playing at the State Theater in Eau Claire, Wisconsin, singer/guitarist John Cranford's hometown. The band returned south to open for Phillip Phillips at Savannah's Rock and Roll Marathon in November, before heading west again in December.

In 2015 Cranford Hollow began working on their fourth record, St. Telluride. The album was recorded at Studio in the Clouds on the Hastings Mesa, ten miles west of Telluride, and was engineered by Preston Havill. In April 2015 original drummer Randy Rockalotta returned to the band. Cranford Hollow spent the summer touring extensively, including in Wyoming and Montana. In August the band returned to The South Carolina Lowcountry and released their fourth full-length album, St. Telluride.

After touring throughout the autumn and winter, Cranford Hollow returned to Studio in the Clouds and began recording their fifth album, COLOR/SOUND/RENEW/REVIVE.

=== Members ===
- John Cranford - vocals, guitar
- Eric Reid - vocals, fiddle
- Yannie Reynecke - guitar
- Phillips Sirmans - bass
- Randy Rockalotta - drums

=== Discography ===
- The Crescent Beach Sessions (2011)
- Cranford Hollow (2013)
- Spanish Moss and Smoke (2014)
- St. Telluride (2015)
- COLOR/SOUND/RENEW/REVIVE (2016)
