= Cut-throat Records =

Canadian record label

Label design as used on first release (CUT-1)

"Listen in Safety" logo from 1980, and CD mounted in jewel case

Cut-throat Records (also known as Cut-throat Productions) is a record label created and run by Canadian musician Nash the Slash. It has been active from 1978 to the present. Cut-throat is also the name of Nash's recording studio, originally located above the Roxy Theatre on Danforth Avenue in Toronto.

Although the label has been used primarily for Nash's own music, it has also issued a single by Toronto new wave group Drastic Measures, and a CD by Nash's group FM.

The label's slogan is "Music in a particular vein", possibly a reference to the early Mad Magazine slogan, "Humor in a jugular vein". Nash claims the label name was inspired by his observation that the record industry is a cut-throat business, in addition to being an appropriate match to his horror movie persona and name.

The company logo is a human skull, often positioned on the label with an eye socket over the centre hole. Record labels are usually black and white, often using reversed colours on side two. Another logo of a stylized gas mask with headphones, is used on some CD releases, usually positioned with the mouth over the centre hole. Nash has been using this logo since 1980 (which pre-dates CDs), and by coincidence the original logo's mouth resembles the prongs holding a CD in a standard jewel case.

In 1978 Nash dedicated the Cut-throat label to rock critic Jeffrey Morgan when he autographed Morgan's copy of Bedside Companion, writing: "To Jeffrey Morgan I dedicate the label!"

== First vinyl series, 1978 to 1980 ==
- CUT-1 – Bedside Companion 12-inch 45 rpm EP, 1978
- CUT-2 – Dreams and Nightmares album, 1979
- CUT-3 – "Dead Man's Curve" / "Swing Shift (Souixante-Neuf)" single, 1980

Nash the Slash had intended to release a full album in 1978, but when he received a test pressing copy (manufactured by a company catering to independent labels), he found the sound quality to be unacceptable. As a temporary solution, he selected four songs for a 12-inch EP, in the hope that a wider groove pitch would produce better sound. A full album was issued the following year, and exists in two pressings, the latter from a remixed master made in 1981 for improved sound. (The second edition can be distinguished by four lines of fine print below the artist name on the label; the first edition only has three.) The first two releases were instrumental, and the single has vocals, the B-side being Nash's first compositional collaboration with Toby Dammit who served as Nash's lyricist from 1980 to 1982. Both songs from this single are different versions from those later issued on Dindisc and Virgin. "Dead Man's Curve" is a cover version of the song by Jan and Dean from 1964.

Nash also released a live 12-inch EP titled Hammersmith Holocaust recorded in London, England in 1980, limited to 300 numbered copies. Although it has the appearance of a bootleg release, it was recorded and issued by Nash on a no-name label for promotional use.

== Co-releases with Dindisc and Virgin, 1980 to 1981 ==
In 1980, Nash the Slash signed to Dindisc in the UK, via Virgin Records in Canada (which released Canadian editions of Dindisc records as Dindisc / Virgin, distributed by Polygram Records). Dindisc was a separate label from Virgin in the UK during this time, but one UK single was a Virgin / Dindisc co-release using Virgin's catalogue numbering system. Most releases also have the Cut-throat logo on the label; some have all three company names. Records from this series were produced by Steve Hillage, with the exception of one single produced by Bill Nelson.

The title of the instrumental non-album track "Reactor No. 2" was a reference to the failed nuclear reactor which caused the Three Mile Island accident, and inspired Nash to appear with his face covered in bandages from 1979 to the present. "19th Nervous Breakdown" is a cover version of the song by The Rolling Stones from 1966.

=== Canadian album ===
- Cut-throat / Dindisc / Virgin VL-2212 – Children of the Night, 1981
- Cut-throat / Dindisc / Virgin VL4-2212 – Children of the Night cassette edition, 1981 – includes extra track: "Reactor No. 2"

=== UK album ===
- Cut-throat / Dindisc DID-9 – Children of the Night, 1981
- Cut-throat / Dindisc DIDC-9 – Children of the Night cassette edition, 1981 – does not include the extra track

=== UK singles ===
- Cut-throat / Dindisc / Virgin VS-1126 – "Dead Man's Curve" / "Metropolis", 1981 – B-side is an extended version
- Cut-throat / Dindisc DIN-28 – "Dead Man's Curve" / "Reactor No. 2", 1981 – B-side is a non-album track
- Cut-throat / Dindisc DIN-29 – "19th Nervous Breakdown" / "Danger Zone", 1981
- Dindisc DIN-33 – "Novel Romance" / "In a Glass Eye", 1981 – A-side produced by Bill Nelson and is a non-album track

=== Other editions ===
Some of these records were issued in other countries. In West Germany, the album was issued as Virgin 203-406, and the DIN-29 single as Virgin 103-066, both distributed by Ariola Records. DIN-28 was issued in Australia as Dindisc DIN-28, in the Netherlands as Dindisc 102-949, and in Portugal as Dindisc VVD-45.041-ES. These do not have the Cut-throat logo on the labels.

=== Also released ===
- Cash Cows various artists album, Canadian edition, Virgin MILK-1, 1980 – Preceding the Dindisc album and singles, this Virgin sampler (advertised as "an album for the price of a single" on the cover) includes a version of "Swing Shift (Souixante-Neuf)" that is different from other releases. It is similar to the album version, but has the drum machine fade-in introduction from the original Canadian single version. Other editions of this album exist from other countries, with different track selections (in the UK it was issued in more than one version), but only the Canadian edition has Nash's track.
- "Swing Shift (Flexi-Version)" – This stripped-down mix was issued on a one-sided 33 rpm blue vinyl flexidisc included with Smash Hits magazine, UK, March 1981. The song is the second of two tracks, preceded by "Pretending to See the Future" (live version) by Orchestral Manoeuvres in the Dark.

== Second vinyl series, 1981 to 1982 ==
Nash the Slash's work with Virgin and Dindisc was brief (as a result of Dindisc ceasing operations by the end of 1981), and after a year-long stay in the UK (1980 to 1981), he returned to Toronto and resumed his independent releases.

- CUT-4 – "It Won't Be Long" / "Modern Heart" single by Drastic Measures, 1981
- CUT-5 – Decomposing 12-inch mini album, 1981
- CUT-6 – And You Thought You Were Normal album, 1982

Nash had no involvement with recording the single by Drastic Measures, although he did appear on their album, Drastic Measures (1980). The single's tracks are not taken from the album.

Decomposing has four songs, and claims to be "playable at any speed"; the label shows timings for play at 33, 45, and even 78 rpm. However, this is likely a gimmick inspired by the fact that Nash's instrumental music, being almost entirely electric, generally sounds no less correct when played at incorrect speeds. Two songs also appeared on a 12-inch single (see below) with playing speed of 45 rpm specified on the label, and these sound the same as Decomposing played at 45 rpm. The other two also appeared on The Million Year Picnic album (see below), which plays at 33 rpm, but sounds the same as Decomposing played at 45 rpm. Therefore, Decomposing at 45 rpm is likely the speed at which these songs were recorded. Nash would play again with the sound of his music played at different speeds on his Blind Windows CD.

Nash told Jeffrey Morgan several years ago that he wanted to reissue the album as part of a software program that would allow the listener to play the album at any speed on their home computer. However, despite a near-complete reissue of Nash's back catalogue on CD, Decomposing has yet to be reissued.

CUT-6 was issued in the USA as Cut-throat Records PVC-8913, distributed by PVC Records, and in the UK as Shaghai Records HAI-104. PVC also released a 12-inch single (this time on their own PVC label), "Dance After Curfew (Dance Mix)" // "Womble" / "The Calling" – PVC Records 4905 (USA), which became a surprise underground hit in Poland, where curfews and restrictions on Western music were imposed at the time. The song's only lyric is a chant of the title, which likely transcended language barriers.

== Releases in 1984 ==
Nash the Slash suspended his independent releases when he signed with Quality Records to release American Band-ages – Quality Records SV-2132, 1984, reissued on MCA Records in 1986. The album consists entirely of cover versions of American rock classics, including "We're an American Band" by Grand Funk Railroad from 1973 (wherein Nash sings "I'm an American band", a further irony being that Nash is really Canadian), and the theme music for American Bandstand (officially titled "Bandstand Boogie"), both of which are referenced by the album title.

Another song on the album, "1984" originally by Spirit in 1970, was issued as a single in several forms, including a 7-inch single: "1984 (Radio Edit)" (3:40) / "1984 (Album Version)" (5:35) – Quality Records Q-2442X, and a 12-inch 33 rpm single: "1984 (West Side Radio Version)" (6:10) / "1984 (East Side Dance Version)" (7:10) – Quality Records QDC-301. Regarding the "album version", the song actually appears on the album twice, as "1984 (West Side Version)" (5:35) and "1984 (Dance Version)" (6:35), the latter followed by a short 0:35 cover version of Creedence Clearwater Revival's "Run Through the Jungle" which also appears uncredited on the 12-inch dance version, and accounts for its longer run time of 7:10. (Therefore, the B-sides of these two singles are the same as the two album versions, while the A-sides are different.)

"West Side" and "East Side" are marked on the 12-inch single's labels in place of side numbers, and not as parts of the subtitles, but the subtitle of the first album version suggests they were intended as parts of the subtitles, as shown (ambiguously) on the 12-inch single's back cover. Additional versions of the single were issued, including "1984" / "1984 (Instrumental)", and the promo-only "1984 (Radio Mix)" / "1984 (Radio Remix)".

There is also a promo EP titled Radio Sampler: 4 External Cuts Only which actually contains six alternate tracks: "Who Do You Dub? (Who Do You Love?) (Extended Club Dub Mix)" (covering Bo Diddley from 1956), "Psychotic Reaction (Good-bye Jody, Good-bye John)" (covering Count Five from 1966, though the subtitle seems to reference Supertramp's "Goodbye Stranger" from 1979; the album version of this track includes dialogue recreating John Hinckley Jr.'s communications to Jodie Foster leading up to his historic assassination attempt, but does not musically reference the Supertramp song; it's not certain if the promo version does or not), "Psychotic Reaction (Slight Return)" (the subtitle referencing "Voodoo Child (Slight Return)" by Jimi Hendrix from 1968), "American Bandstand Boogie", "American Band (Party Animal Remaster)", and "Who Do You Dub? (Instrumental)".

Further singles from the album were issued: "American Band" / "American Bandstand Boogie", and "Born to Be Wild" (covering Steppenwolf from 1968) / "Who Do You Dub?" – Quality Records Q-2453X.

A Nash the Slash compilation album was issued on The Residents' label: The Million Year Picnic – Ralph Records ("New Ralph" series) NS-8409, 1984. Tracks on this album are new remixes, with the exception of two songs from Decomposing. Scarce editions on red vinyl and clear vinyl also exist. This album was also issued on CD.

== CD series, 1991 to present ==
Nash the Slash spent most of the late 1980s working with his group FM, and continued to perform as a solo artist during this time, including appearances as an "opening act" for FM. After the group disbanded in 1989, Nash restarted Cut-throat Records as a CD label.

- CUTCD-1 – Highway 61 soundtrack by Nash the Slash with Doc Satan's Orchestra, 1991
  - Doc Satan's Orchestra includes Tony Malone, ex Drastic Measures, who also composed about half of the CD.
  - Another soundtrack CD for this film with different tracks by various artists, was issued on Intrepid Records in 1992. This version has only one song from Nash the Slash.
  - Reissued in 1997, possibly as CUT-1CD.
- Cut-throat / Magada MAGHCD-78 – Blind Windows, 1997
  - Reissue of Bedside Companion EP (CUT-1, 1978) and Dreams and Nightmares album (CUT-2, 1979), plus Bedside Companion – The Marsden Versions which is the EP as played at 33 instead of 45 rpm, inspired by an incident in which disc jockey David Marsden mistakenly played the entire record on radio at 33 rpm at the time of its release.
  - May have been reissued as CUT-2CD; described with this number at Nash's website.
  - EP and album transferred from vinyl, as the original master tapes no longer exist.
- CUT-3CD – Thrash, 1999
- CUT-4CD – Children of the Night, 2000
  - Reissue of the 1981 album with six bonus tracks: original single and flexidisc versions of "Swing Shift (Souixante-Neuf)", "Reactor No. 2", and three live tracks.
  - Album transferred from vinyl, as the original master tape could not be obtained.
- CUT-5CD – Nosferatu soundtrack, 2001
  - Soundtrack for the 1922 silent film.
- CUT-6CD – Lost in Space by Nash the Slash, Cameron Hawkins & Martin Deller, 2001
  - All tracks originally recorded as FM. Previously unreleased demo and live recordings from 1976 to 1984, including the only release of tracks by the original FM lineup of Cameron Hawkins and Nash the Slash (1976 to 1977), and demo versions of songs for the FM album Con-Test (released 1985).
  - Cover lists 9 tracks, but the CD includes additional unlisted tracks.
- CUT-7CD – And You Thought You Were Normal, 2002
  - Reissue of the 1982 album with different track order (the original album had all vocal tracks on side one, all instrumentals on side two), plus seven bonus tracks, of which only the single version of "Dance After Curfew" was previously released.
- CUT-8CD – American BandAges, 2003
  - Reissue of the 1984 album (now using CamelCase spelling), with three bonus tracks.
- CUT-COM1 – The Simultaneous Man
  - CD accompanying a comic book by Matt Howarth which features Nash the Slash as a character; the CD has narration and music by Nash.
- CUT-9CD – In-A-Gadda-Da-Nash, 2008
  - All songs are cover versions, including "In-A-Gadda-Da-Vida" originally by Iron Butterfly from 1968.
- CUT-10CD – Live in London 2008, 2009
- Dog Will Hunt (forthcoming)

== Video releases ==
=== Planned Anarchy Productions ===
Nash the Slash released several live video performances on VHS video cassettes as Planned Anarchy Productions, which are out of print, and have yet to be reissued on DVD.

- American Banned – performance in Trenton, New Jersey from February 21, 1983
- Give Me the Creeps – performance in London, Ontario from February 8, 1997
- Halloween – performance in Winnipeg, Manitoba from October 31, 1999
- Lurid, Livid and Live - box set of the three videos above, released in 1999

=== Two Artists ===
Though it was not explicitly identified as a division of Cut-throat, Nash the Slash created a DVD label called Two Artists for his collaborations with surrealist painter Robert Vanderhorst.

- TwoA-01 – View From the Gallery – One, 2004
- TwoA-02 – View From the Gallery – Two, 2005
