= Surveillance (FM album) =

Studio album by FM
- Released: 1979
- Recorded: Sounds Interchange, Toronto
- Genre: Space rock
- Length: 36:09
- Labels: Passport, Arista
- Producer: Keith Whiting

FM chronology
Direct to Disc (1978)	Surveillance (1979)	City of Fear (1980)

Surveillance is the third album by FM, a progressive rock group from Toronto, Ontario, Canada, released on Passport Records in summer 1979, the first to be "widely issued." The album reached #69 on the Canadian charts, December 29, 1979. It has been re-released for the first time in CD format on Esoteric Records in March 2013.

== Notes on songs ==
The album continues the space rock lyrical theme introduced on Black Noise; the opening track's chorus is a chant of "Sci-fi rock, rocket roll".

The group's first cover version appears on this album: "Shapes of Things", originally recorded by The Yardbirds in 1966. FM (and Nash the Slash) would frequently pay tribute to their favourite songs, mostly from the 1960s, in the years to come. This song was also issued as a single (Arista 0477 in the USA).

An unusual song on Surveillance is a mostly instrumental track titled "Sofa Back", which the group performed live without its brief vocoderized chant of "Moe, Larry, cheese", a quote from the Three Stooges short film "Horses' Collars", expecting the audience would not understand it. Much to the group's surprise, audiences usually chanted the phrase during performance. This song also has a copyright date of 1966, and is presumably an old composition of Mink's which he brought to the group.

"Random Harvest' is featured on a 2006 benefit album titled After The Storm for the survivors of Hurricane Katrina.

A remastered edition of Surveillance was released by Esoteric Records (ECLEC2383) on March 25, 2013.

== Track listing ==
All compositions by Cameron Hawkins, Martin Deller, Ben Mink, except as noted.

Side one

1. "Rocket Roll" – 3:29
2. "Orion" – 1:33
3. "Horizons" – 4:21
4. "Random Harvest" – 4:36
5. "Shapes of Things" (Paul Samwell-Smith, Keith Relf, Jim McCarty) – 3:07

Side two

1. "Seventh Heaven" – 5:39
2. "Father Time" – 4:23
3. "Sofa Back" (Mink, B. Feldman) – 3:01
4. "Destruction" – 6:00

== Personnel ==
- Cameron Hawkins – lead vocals, synthesizers, bass guitar, piano
- Ben Mink – electric violin, electric mandolin, vocals
- Martin Deller – drums, percussion

=== Technical credits ===
- Recorded at Sounds Interchange, Toronto, Ontario, Canada
- Produced by Keith Whiting by arrangement with Jake Productions
- Engineered by Mike Jones, assisted by Ed Stone
- Synthesizers produced and programmed with the assistance of Larry Fast
- Mastered at Sterling Sound, New York City, USA by George Marino
- Art direction: Murray Brenman
- Front cover photo: Paul Till
- Back cover and inner sleeve photos: John Herzog
