= FM (Canadian band) =

Canadian rock band formed 1976

- Origin: Toronto, Ontario, Canada
- Genres: Progressive rock; space rock
- Years active: 1976–1989, 1994–1996, 2006, 2011–present
- Labels: CBC; Labyrinth; Visa; Passport; Quality; MCA; Duke Street; Now See Hear; Esoteric Recordings
- Members: Cameron Hawkins; Paul DeLong; Aaron Solomon; Ed Bernard
- Past members: Nash the Slash; Martin Deller; Ben Mink; Simon Brierly; Greg Critchley; Randy Cooke; Martin Shaw; Paul Marangoni; Claudio Vena; Ivana Popovic

FM is a Canadian progressive rock music group formed in Toronto in 1976 by Cameron Hawkins and Jeff Plewman (renamed Nash the Slash). The band existed from 1976 to 1989, 1994–1996, 2006, and 2011–present. They have had periods of inactivity during their existence. Their music has been categorized as space rock, and lyrics are dominated by science fiction themes. In November 2011, Hawkins reformed the band with two new players.

== History ==
=== Hawkins / Nash the Slash lineup ===
The band's original 1976 lineup consisted of two people: Cameron Hawkins on synthesizer, occasional bass guitar, and lead vocals, and Jeff Plewman (a.k.a. Nash the Slash) on electric violin, electric mandolin, and backing vocals. The group did not use guitars. The duo first met each other while jamming with a band called Clear.

The group first recorded in July 1976. A few months later, TVOntario recorded an in-studio performance for the Night Music Concert TV show, first broadcast on November 3. It is very likely this was also the date of recording. The half-hour show, shown with no commercial breaks, presented the band playing three long pieces: "Phasors on Stun", "One O'Clock Tomorrow", and "Black Noise". It also included a nonsensical biography of the group resembling free-association poetry, recited by David Pritchard (electronic musician, record producer, and CHUM-FM DJ, 1960s-1970s), accompanied by electronic background music and a collage of photos and artwork by Paul Till, appearing between the first and second songs. Neither this music, nor any performances by the original two-person lineup, were released on an album until 2001.

FM's first public performance took place in November 1976 at the A Space art gallery in Toronto shortly after the TV show first aired.

=== Hawkins / Nash the Slash / Deller lineup No. 1 ===
Some time after February 1977 the group became a trio when they added Martin Deller on drums. Deller had worked with Nash earlier in 1976 when they and David Pritchard played a 13-minute improvised piece titled "An Admission of Guilt" for Pritchard's album, Nocturnal Earthworm Stew.

After appearing on the Canadian Broadcasting Corporation TV variety show Who's New, FM was approached by the CBC to make an album, ultimately titled Black Noise, which the group presumed would be distributed in stores like a normal release. But the CBC chose to sell it by mail order and only announced its availability during several radio shows. Only 500 copies were pressed, which was sufficient to meet the demands of this limited promotion. The CBC edition's black and white cover shows a picture of a manhole cover; a different cover by Paul Till was used for later reissues on other labels.

Sometime in 1977, Plewman, after recovering from a severe car/bike accident, decided to leave the band and resumed his solo career as Nash the Slash, stating that the addition of a drummer gave the band a sound which was too commercial for his liking.

=== Hawkins / Mink / Deller lineup ===
Before the end of 1977, Plewman (now active as the solo artist Nash the Slash) was replaced by Ben Mink, who also played electric violin and electric mandolin. Their first record was Direct to Disc (also released as Head Room, or Headroom), and was made using the direct to disc recording method, in which recording tape is not used. Several editions of the album exist.

Later in 1978, the group got its first proper record contract with Visa Records in the USA, and Passport Records in Canada, the latter distributed by GRT Records. (Passport was a sub-label of Visa, although Passport was the more prolific of the two labels.) Their first release for these labels was a reissue of the CBC album, Black Noise, now made available in stores for the first time. The USA edition was released in the summer of 1978, while the Canadian edition came out near the end of the year. A single from the album, "Phasors on Stun" helped to promote the album, for which the group were presented a gold record award. However, Cameron Hawkins claims they never received royalty payments from any of the Canadian LP editions, as their contract specified all payments were to come through Visa Records in the USA, and none of the three Canadian distributors passed royalties on to Visa.

Black Noise was followed by Surveillance in the summer of 1979, the first widely released album with the group's then-current lineup, although it was delayed because GRT Records went out of business one week before the intended release date. Canadian distribution of the Passport label was bought out by Capitol Records who subsequently released both albums. In 1981 the Passport label declared bankruptcy, but was rescued again the following year by new Canadian distributor A&M Records, who reissued Black Noise again.

In 1980, FM released another album, City of Fear, produced by Larry Fast, who released a series of electronic music albums under the name Synergy and also played keyboards on Peter Gabriel's early albums. Ben Mink also recorded an instrumental solo album, Foreign Exchange with the other members of FM as his backing band. Ben Mink left FM in 1983.

=== Hawkins / Nash the Slash / Deller lineup No. 2 ===
In 1983, Nash the Slash proposed a future double bill tour with FM, as the two artists seemed to share a common audience, since FM's best known previous album was the one he made with them in 1977. But they had still not found a replacement for Ben Mink. Nash resolved the problem by rejoining the band. Just as work was beginning on a new album in 1984, Passport Records folded for the third and final time. Nash had been signed to Quality Records as a solo artist in 1983, and was about to release his solo album American Band-ages, which the originally proposed tour had been intended to promote, and was able to get FM signed to the label as well. The other two members of FM also play on Nash's album. The double bill concept was retained, with Nash playing a solo set as the opening act for FM concerts. The FM album, released in 1985, was titled Con-Test. Ben Mink also appears on the album.

A live show at the Masonic Temple in Toronto was videotaped and aired by the CBC as one of its Rock Deluxe TV specials in 1985.

FM seemed to be cursed by record labels going out of business. The Quality Records company had existed since the early 1950s, and by the 1960s was Canada's biggest domestic label; but they ceased operations shortly after the album was released. MCA Records picked up the reissue rights for Con-Test, as well as Nash's American Band-ages, but the abrupt change in record labels led to a near-absence of promotion for both records. Martin Deller left the band at the conclusion of its 1986 tour.

=== Hawkins / Nash the Slash / Brierly / Critchley lineup ===
In 1986, FM replaced Deller with Greg Critchley (ex The Partland Brothers and The Spoons) on drums, and added Simon Brierley (ex Lee Aaron's band and Strange Advance) on guitars. Before this time, FM (and Nash as a solo artist) were notable for not using electric guitars, therefore this change made a significant alteration to their sound. They recorded Tonight for Duke Street Records, with the first pressing issued on green vinyl. Duke Street also issued the album on CD, with five bonus tracks from Con-Test, followed by a CD edition of the earlier album. Five songs were also used in the horror film Friday the 13th Part VII: The New Blood (1988).

=== Hawkins / Nash the Slash / Brierly / Cooke lineup ===
In 1988, Randy Cooke replaced Greg Critchley on drums. This lineup disbanded after touring the Tonight album.

=== Hawkins / Shaw / Brierly / Marangoni lineup ===
In 1989, FM consisted of Hawkins and Brierly, augmented by the new members Martin Shaw (also known as Marty Warsh) on mandolin and violin and drummer Paul Marangoni. Information on this lineup is scarce, and though Marangoni has stated that this line-up planned to record, they disbanded in the early 1990s. Marangoni has since shared footage of this lineup on YouTube.

=== Hawkins / Nash the Slash / Deller lineup No. 3 ===
In 1994, Cameron Hawkins created a new record company called Now See Hear Records (initially self-distributed, but later distributed by MCA Records as of 1996), and purchased the rights to Black Noise which was still owned by the CBC, but ownership was set to expire that year. Hawkins was surprised to find a competitor bidding for the rights, but his label emerged as the winning bidder. By this time, the CBC no longer possessed a master tape of the album. A search for the tape at the CBC turned up a reel tape box with an inferior cassette copy inside. Hawkins then travelled to the USA to search the former Passport Records vaults for the tapes of this, and the other Passport albums, without success. Ultimately, the Now See Hear reissue of Black Noise was made from a transfer from vinyl. Now See Hear also licensed the recording to One Way Records, a company specializing in reissues, which released an American edition.

The reissue was followed by a reformation of the group's classic lineup for a series of concerts from 1994 to 1996, resulting in a new live CD titled RetroActive recorded November 1994 in Toronto, and issued on Now See Hear in 1995. The album included some previously unrecorded songs.

In 2001, Nash the Slash compiled unreleased and live FM recordings from the 1970s and 1980s on a CD titled Lost in Space on his own Cut-throat Records label. This release was not approved by the other members, and did not mention the name FM; the artist was listed as "Nash the Slash, Cameron Hawkins & Martin Deller". It includes recordings made by the original Hawkins / Nash the Slash lineup in 1976 and 1977, and demo versions of songs for Con-Test recorded in 1984.

=== Hawkins / Vena / Deller lineup ===
In 2006, FM reformed again for a live performance at NEARfest in Bethlehem, Pennsylvania, USA on June 24, and also gave a concert prior to this in Toronto on June 16. The new lineup included Italian musician Claudio Vena on electric violin and electric mandolin. New CD and DVD recordings by this lineup have been issued, and the band's website has not been updated since 2006.

In 2010, Martin Deller uploaded a video on YouTube, advertising for drumming and recording lessons. The video consists of clips from the NEARfest 2006 performance which is also mentioned as being an upcoming release.

=== 2011 to 2014 ===
Since 2011, Cameron Hawkins has worked on material with a new incarnation of FM. Joining Hawkins are Paul DeLong on drums, Aaron Solomon on violin, and Ed Bernard of Druckfarben on viola and mandolin. The band is putting the finishing touches on songs for a new album that is to be released by Esoteric Recordings.

On May 12, 2014, Nash the Slash died at age 66.

=== 2015 ===
FM's first studio album in 28 years, Transformation, was released in April, 2015 via Esoteric/Cherry Red Recordings. The lineup was Hawkins (bass, keyboards), Paul DeLong (drums), Edward Bernard (viola, mandolin), and Aaron Solomon (violin).

== Members ==
=== Current members ===
- Cameron Hawkins – keyboards, lead vocals, bass (1976–1989, 1994–1996, 2006, 2011–present)
- Paul DeLong – drums (2011–present)
- Edward Bernard – viola, mandolin (2011–present)
- Aaron Solomon – violin (2011–present)

=== Past members ===
- Nash the Slash – violin, backing and lead vocals, mandolin, harmonica (1976–1977, 1983–1989, 1994–1996)
- Martin Deller – drums, percussion, keyboards (1977–1986, 2006)
- Ben Mink – violin, backing vocals (1977–1983)
- Simon Brierly – guitars, backing vocals (1986–1989)
- Greg Critchley – drums, backing vocals, occasional lead vocals (1986–1988)
- Randy Cooke – drums (1988)
- Martin Shaw – mandolin, violin (1989)
- Paul Marangoni – drums (1989)
- Claudio Vena – violin, mandolin (2006)
- Ivana Popovic

== Discography ==
=== Albums ===
==== Studio albums ====
- Black Noise (1977) (#60 Can)
- Direct to Disc (1978) (also reissued as Head Room (1980), with different takes of some tracks)
- Surveillance (1979) (#69 Can)
- City of Fear (1980) (#86 Can)
- Con-Test (1985) (#56 Can)
- Tonight (1987) (#87 Can)
- Transformation (2015)

==== Live albums ====
- RetroActive (1995)
- Lost in Space (artist listed as Nash the Slash, Cameron Hawkins & Martin Deller) (2001)
- Live @ NEARfest 2006 (2014)

=== Singles ===
- "Phasors on Stun" / "Dialing for Dharma" – Passport Records, 1978
- "Shapes of Things" – Arista Records 0477 (USA), 1979
- "Just Like You" – Quality Records, 1985 – Canadian chart No. 38
- "All of the Dreams" – 1986 – Canadian chart No. 86
- "Why Don't You Take It" / "Just Like You" – MCA Records 52840 (with cover), 1986 – Canadian chart No. 90
- "Why Don't You Take It (Flight Mix)" / "Just Like You (Fun Mix)" – MCA Records 23634 (12 inch single with cover), 1986
- "She Does What She Wants" – MCA Records, 1986 – this song later appeared on the Duke Street album Tonight, 1987
- "Good Vibrations" / "Good Vibrations (instrumental)" – 1987 – only available with fan club membership
- "Dream Girl" / "The Real Thing" – Duke Street Records (with cover), 1987 – Canadian chart No. 41
- "Magic (in Your Eyes)" / "I'm Not Mad (Ready for the World)" – Duke Street Records, 1988 – Canadian chart No. 52
- "She Does What She Wants" / "She Does What She Wants (Front and Main Mix, A cappella version)" – Duke Street Records 10042, 1988
- "Hideaway" / "Hideaway (Edited for broadcast)" - Now See Hear 1095, 1995 - Mixed mode CD containing CD-Rom and CD-Audio data
