= City of Fear (album) =

Studio album by FM
- Released: 1980
- Recorded: Soundstage, Toronto
- Studio: House of Music, West Orange, New Jersey; Phase One, Toronto
- Genre: Progressive rock
- Length: 43:06
- Label: Passport
- Producer: Larry Fast

FM chronology
Surveillance (1979)	City of Fear (1980)	Con-Test (1985)

City of Fear is the fourth album by FM, a progressive rock group from Toronto, Canada, released in 1980 on Passport Records and distributed in Canada by Capitol Records, catalogue number PB-2028, and in the USA on Passport distributed by Jem Records, catalogue number PB-6004. It was produced by Larry Fast who was notable for his Synergy series of electronic music albums. A remastered edition was released by Esoteric Records (ECLEC2383) on March 25, 2013. The album made a brief appearance at #86 on the Canadian Top 100 Album charts just as the charts changed to a Top 50 ranking.

== Track listing ==
All compositions by FM (Martin Deller, Ben Mink, Cameron Hawkins), all lyrics by Hawkins.

Side one

1. "Krakow" – 4:37
2. "Power" – 3:28
3. "Truth or Consequences" – 4:13
4. "Lost and Found" – 4:25
5. "City of Fear" – 5:07

Side two

1. "Surface to Air" – 5:18
2. "Up to You" – 4:21
3. "Silence" – 3:22
4. "Riding the Thunder" – 4:06
5. "Nobody at All" – 4:09

== Personnel ==
- Martin Deller – Gretsch drums, Zildjian and Paiste cymbals, glockenspiel, Moog percussion controller with Minimoog, PAiA programmable drum synthesizer, tympani
- Ben Mink – 5 string "bent" mandolin (electric), 5 string "Violite" (electric violin), 5 string viola (acoustic), 1912 "The Gibson" mandolin (acoustic), Fender amplifiers, vocals
- Cameron Hawkins – lead vocals, Mutron and Electro-Harmonix FX pedals, 9.95, Prophet 5, Minimoog, (Moog) Taurus pedals, ELKA (synthesizer), Yamaha grand (piano), Rickenbacker bass, Polyfusion sequencer, Larry's Moog 15 (modular synthesizer), Mellotron

Additional personnel

- Pamela Silverstein – spoken word

=== Technical credits ===
- Produced by Larry Fast
- Engineered by Jim Frank and Charles Conrad, assisted by Scott Rea and Cliff Hodsdon
- Production assistance by Ian Murray
- Recorded at Soundstage, Toronto, Canada, and House of Music, West Orange, New Jersey, USA
- Additional material recorded at Phase One, Toronto by Mark Wright
- Mastered by Bub Ludwig at Masterdisk, New York City, USA
- Synthy maintenance by Rob Onedera
- Pre-production with Ed Stone, Ian Dunbar, Jim Frank, Ian Murray, Mark Wright
- Art direction and design: Murray Brenman
- Photography – cover: Eric Staller
- Photography – insider cover: Paul Till
- Photography – stand-ups: Bob Rock (the cover art features time lapse photography using life-size cardboard cut-out images of the group's members)
