= Children of the Night (album) =

Studio album by Nash the Slash
- Released: February 1981
- Recorded: Britannia Row, London November–December 1980
- Genre: Progressive rock
- Label: Dindisc
- Producer: Steve Hillage

Nash the Slash chronology
Dreams & Nightmares (1979)	Children of the Night (1981)	And You Thought You Were Normal (1982)

Professional ratings
Review scores
Source	Rating
Allmusic	4/5 stars

Children of the Night is an album by Canadian recording artist Nash the Slash. Released in 1981 after Nash toured the United Kingdom in 1980 supporting Gary Numan, the album quickly gained cult status with its unique sound, created using electric mandolins, electric violins, drum machines and other sonic devices. The album sleeve proudly proclaims "There are no guitars."

In amongst original material by Nash were quirky covers of Jan and Dean's "Dead Man's Curve" and The Rolling Stones' "19th Nervous Breakdown". His adaptation of Deep Purple's "Smoke on the Water" was entitled "Dopes on the Water", while the opening composition "Wolf" quoted musical passages from Prokofiev's Peter and the Wolf.

The album was recorded in six weeks at Britannia Row Studios, London, in late 1980 and produced by Steve Hillage. It was released on the Virgin Records label Dindisc, which was owned by Richard Branson. The album was re-released on CD in 2000 with bonus tracks. The cover photo was taken at the road entrance looking up from Paddington Station, London.

== Track listing ==
All tracks composed by Nash the Slash; except where indicated

1. "Wolf"
2. "Dead Man's Curve" (Jan Berry, Roger Christian, Artie Kornfeld, Brian Wilson)
3. "Children of the Night" (Toby Dammit, Nash the Slash)
4. "Deep Forest"
5. "In a Glass Eye"
6. "19th Nervous Breakdown" (Mick Jagger, Keith Richards)
7. "Swing Shift (Soixante Neuf)" (Toby Dammit, Nash the Slash)
8. "Metropolis"
9. "Dopes on the Water" (Ritchie Blackmore, Ian Gillan, Roger Glover, Jon Lord, Ian Paice)
10. "Danger Zone"
11. "Wolf" (live version 1980) *
12. "Danger Zone" (live version 1980) *
13. "Reactor No. 2" (Slash) *
14. "Swing Shift" (original version) *
15. "Swing Shift" (flexi version) *
16. "Children of the Night" (live version 1997) *

* Bonus tracks on CD re-release only 2000

== Personnel ==
- Martyn Atkins – Artwork
- Gavin Cochrane – Photography
- Nick Griffiths – Engineer
- Steve Hillage – Producer
- Nash the Slash – Synthesizer, mandolin, composer, keyboards, voices, electronic percussion, pedals, electric violin, devices
