= Black Noise (FM album) =

- Original CBC edition cover

Studio album by FM
- Released: 1978
- Recorded: 1977
- Studios: Sounds Interchange, Toronto
- Genres: Progressive rock; space rock; jazz fusion
- Length: 40:26
- Labels: CBC, Visa, Passport, Now See Hear
- Producers: FM and Keith Whiting

FM chronology
Black Noise (1978)	Direct to Disc (1978)

Alternative covers
- Cover by Paul Till used on all editions from 1978 onward

Black Noise is the debut studio album by Canadian progressive rock group FM. Released in a limited edition by CBC in early 1978, it didn't receive widespread release until later that year when GRT/Passport Records did a full release of the album that shot up the Canadian record charts fueled by the hit single "Phasors on Stun". The B-side was the instrumental song "Slaughter in Robot Village". A second single was released, "Journey", with the B-side, "Hours". It didn't sell as well, and barely charted.

In 2015, Rolling Stone released its list of 50 of the Greatest Progressive Rock Albums of All Time, and Black Noise made the list at number forty eight (#48).

== Music and lyrics ==
John Cunningham of WhatCulture said: "Like a psychedelic trip through deep space, Black Noise is unpredictable, scary and adventurous."

All songs with lyrics have science fiction themes. The title "Phasors On Stun" (sometimes announced as "Set Your Phasors On Stun" when performed live) is a reference to the futuristic weapons from Star Trek; the phrase does not appear in the lyrics. "One O'Clock Tomorrow" was inspired by an interview with Timothy Leary as broadcast on The Tomorrow Show with Tom Snyder (which came on at one o'clock a.m.), on which Leary talked about his ideas on space travel; or as explained by Hawkins in an introduction to the song during a live performance (from a radio broadcast), "Old Dr. Tim thought, a couple of bags of this, and a couple of bags of that, and he'd just take off into outer space"; but again, neither the title nor Leary are referenced in the lyrics. "Journey" and "Aldebaran" (misspelled "Aldeberan" on vinyl editions) are both about a mass exodus to another planet. "Dialing for Dharma" (an instrumental) is a pun on Dialing for Dollars, a popular live daytime television program which gave away cash prizes via telephone. "Hours" and "Slaughter in Robot Village" are also instrumentals. "Black Noise" is about mutants who live in a secret underground world beneath a city, and rise up through the sewers at night.

== Release history ==
The album was originally released by CBC Records in early 1978, commissioned after the group appeared on the CBC (Canadian Broadcasting Corporation) TV variety show Who's New. The group expected it would be distributed in stores like a normal release, but the CBC chose to sell it by mail order, and only announced its availability during several radio shows. The album was issued as a limited edition of 500 copies, which was sufficient to meet the response from this limited promotion.

The album was given wider release in the summer of 1978 on Visa Records in the US, and on Passport Records in Canada later that year. (Passport was a sub-label of Visa, although Passport was the more prolific of the two labels.) The CBC still owned the rights to the album, and licensed it to Visa for reissue. In Canada, the Passport label was distributed by GRT Records, then by Capitol Records in 1979, and finally by A&M Records in 1981, each distributor producing a reissue. Cameron Hawkins claims the group never received royalty payments from any of the Canadian LP editions, as their contract specified all payments were to come through Visa Records in the US, and none of the three Canadian distributors passed royalties on to Visa.

At the end of a performance at the Ontario Place Forum, the group were presented a gold record award for the album's sales (gold in Canada representing 50,000 sales).

In 1994 Cameron Hawkins created a new record company called Now See Hear Records (initially self distributed, but later distributed by MCA Records as of 1996), and purchased the rights to Black Noise which was still owned by the CBC, but ownership was set to expire that year. Hawkins was surprised to find a competitor bidding for the rights, but his label emerged as the winning bidder. By this time, the CBC no longer possessed a master tape of the album. A search for the tape at the CBC turned up a reel tape box with an inferior cassette copy inside. Hawkins then travelled to the US to search the former Passport Records vaults for the tapes of this, and the other Passport albums, without success. Ultimately, the Now See Hear reissue of Black Noise was made from a transfer from vinyl. Now See Hear also licensed the recording to One Way Records, a company specializing in reissues, who released an American edition.

The original CBC album has black and white cover art of a manhole cover, unique to that edition. All others have an alternative cover by Paul Till.

The first single from the album, "Phasors on Stun" / "Dialing for Dharma", was issued on Passport in 1978. A second single, "Journey" / "Hours", was issued by Passport in 1978 as a follow-up single.

=== List of editions ===
- CBC Records LM-455 (Canada LP), 1978
- Visa Records VISA-7007 (US LP), 1978
- Passport Records 9167-9831, distributed by GRT Records (Canada LP), 1978 (#60 Can. May 79)
- Passport Records 0060.232, distributed by Metronome Records (West Germany LP), 1978
- Passport Records, distributed by Capitol Records (Canada LP), 1979
- Passport Records, distributed by A&M Records (Canada LP), 1982
- Now See Hear Records NSHD-7007 (Canada CD), 1994
- Now See Hear Records NSBBD-7007, distributed by MCA Records (Canada CD), 1996
- One Way Records OW-33651 (US CD), 1996
- Esoteric Records, ECLEC2376 (UK CD), Remastered, February 25, 2013

== Legacy ==
John Cunningham of WhatCulture wrote in 2023: "FM's debut LP was the most exciting Canadian entry in the genre not composed by Rush. [...] In another custom of the rock and pop scenes that blew up in the '80s, FM have a grand old time with synthesising as well. The chaotic blend provides a fascinatingly odd sound that briefly set FM apart from the pack. While they never managed to reach this quality again, it remains a towering debut from one of prog rock's most eccentric outfits."

== Track listing ==
=== Side one ===
1. "Phasors on Stun" (Nash the Slash, Cameron Hawkins; lyrics: Hawkins) – 3:49
2. "One O'Clock Tomorrow" (Nash the Slash, Hawkins; lyrics: Hawkins) – 6:05
3. "Hours" (Martin Deller) – 2:36
4. "Journey" (Hawkins; lyrics: Hawkins) – 4:41
5. "Dialing for Dharma" (Nash the Slash, Hawkins) – 3:15

=== Side two ===
1. "Slaughter in Robot Village" (Deller) – 5:02
2. "Aldebaran" (Nash the Slash, Deller, Hawkins; lyrics: Hawkins) – 5:02
3. "Black Noise" (Nash the Slash, Hawkins; lyrics: Hawkins) – 9:56

== Personnel ==
- Cameron Hawkins – synthesizers, bass guitar, piano, lead vocals
- Martin Deller – drums, percussion, synthesizers
- Nash the Slash – electric violins and mandolin, glockenspiel, vocals, effects

Produced by Keith Whiting (with FM co-credited, for no apparent reason, on CD editions)
