= Nash the Slash =

Canadian musician (1948–2014)

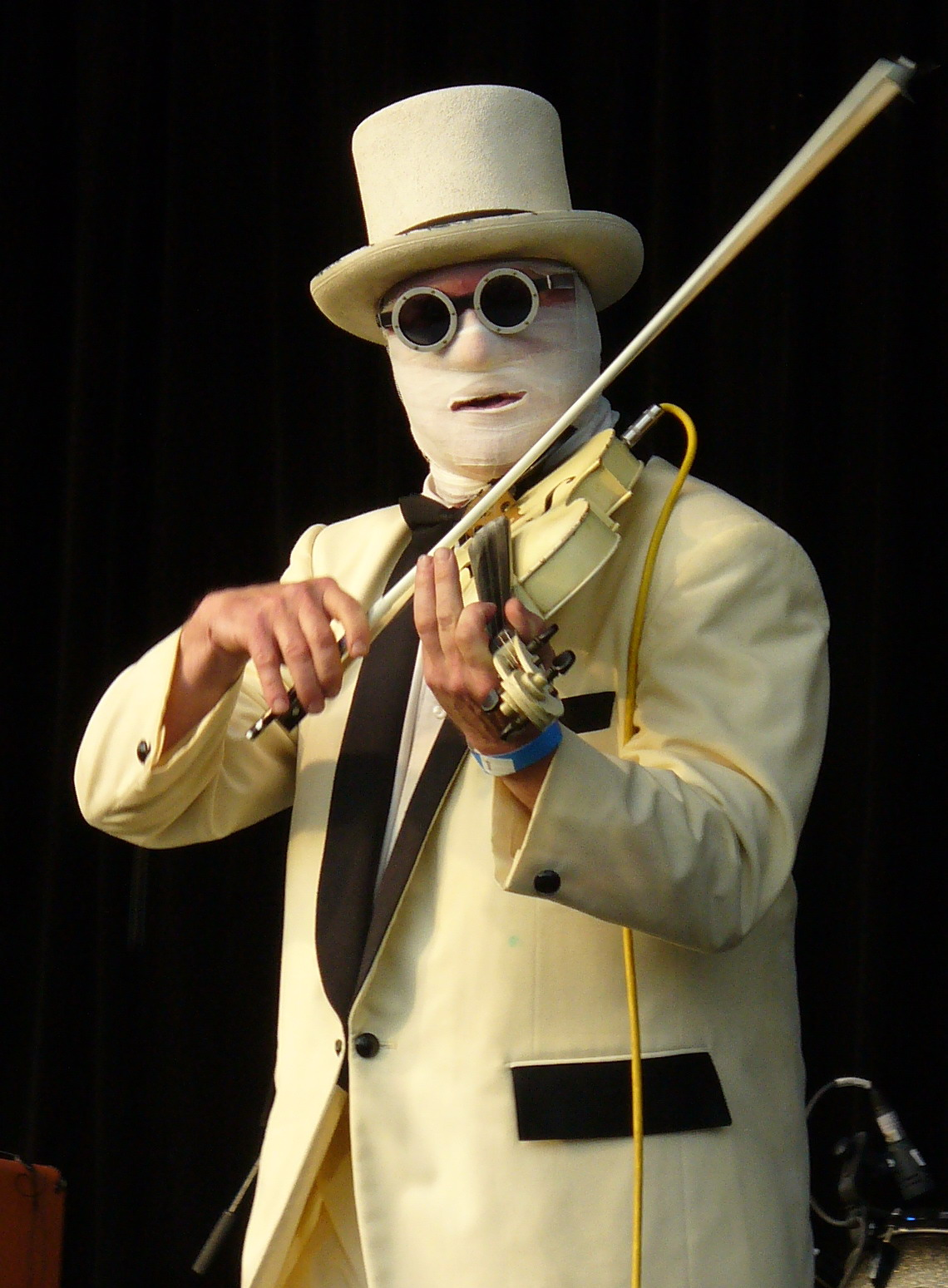
- Nash the Slash at the 2008 Friendship Festival

Background information
- Born: James Jeffrey Plewman; March 26, 1948; Toronto, Ontario, Canada
- Died: May 10, 2014 (aged 66) Toronto, Ontario, Canada
- Genres: Progressive rock; electronic
- Instruments: Electric mandolin; electric violin; keyboards; synthesizer; glockenspiel
- Years active: 1975–2012
- Labels: Cut-throat; Dindisc; Virgin; Quality; PVC; Ralph
- Website: nashtheslash.com

James Jeffrey "Jeff" Plewman (March 26, 1948 – May 10, 2014), better known by his stage name Nash the Slash, was a Canadian musician. A multi-instrumentalist, he was known primarily for playing the electric violin and mandolin, as well as the synthesizer, keyboards, glockenspiel, and other instruments (sometimes described as "devices" on album notes).

Nash worked as a solo artist beginning in 1975; founding the progressive rock band FM in 1976. Soon after releasing the band's first album, Black Noise, in 1977, he left the band; he resumed his solo career in 1978 (it was not until after Nash's departure that the album was widely promoted, eventually charting and receiving a gold record award). He rejoined FM from 1983 to 1988, followed by a brief reunion from 1994 to 1996, all concurrent with his solo work.

Nash's music covers an eclectic range, varying from instrumental—mood-setting music, to rock and pop music with vocals. In addition to giving concert performances, he composed and performed soundtrack music for silent films, presenting these works live in movie theatres to accompany screenings of the films. Another venue for his music was in performances to accompany the viewing of paintings by surrealist painter Robert Vanderhorst, an audiovisual collaboration, which took place in 1978 and again in 2004.

Nash famously never allowed guitars on any of his solo albums and singles. He turned down Pink Floyd guitarist David Gilmour's offer to lay down a guitar track on his album Children of the Night.

== Identity ==
Nash was born in Toronto. He performed with surgical bandages covering his face starting in 1979. "During a gig at The Edge in the late 1970s to raise awareness of the threat from the Three Mile Island disaster, he walked on stage wearing bandages dipped in phosphorus paint and exclaimed: 'Look, this is what happens to you.' The bandages became his trademark." Prior to 1979, Nash performed three times on TV Ontario's Nightmusic Concert, first as a solo artist (a live broadcast which was never re-aired), then with FM (Nash and Cameron Hawkins), and again as a solo artist. In all of these appearances, Nash wore his typical black tuxedo, top hat, and dark sunglasses, but not his signature bandages. He was also photographed in this attire for a profile in the Toronto Star, published April 28, 1978.

In later years, he attempted to keep his true identity the subject of some speculation, although the Star profile of 1978 had already matter-of-factly revealed his real name. Nevertheless, in a 1981 interview with the UK magazine Smash Hits, Nash was questioned about his real name, and replied with "Nashville Thebodiah Slasher". As a result of his coyness about his name, some fans came to believe that the Nash persona was an alter-ego of Ben Mink, who replaced him as FM's violinist and mandolinist in 1978. This is a common misconception, but he has been photographed onstage with Mink.

The "Nash the Slash" persona came from silent film, and Nash said he took his stage name from that of a killer butler encountered by Laurel and Hardy in one of their first films, Do Detectives Think? (1927), for which he composed a soundtrack score. (The film character's name is actually "The Tipton Slasher"; nowhere on screen does "Nash the Slash" appear.)

Images of Nash the Slash are featured in a variety of murals painted by artist Jungle Ling in Toronto. These images are located in the Leslieville district, next to a TD Bank at Queen St. East and Logan Avenue and below Queen St. East on Connaught Avenue, as part of a neighborhood beautification project conducted by the Toronto Transit Commission.

There was an urban legend that Nash the Slash was actually Canadian country artist Anne Murray in disguise.

== Career ==
Nash's music is a complex blend of progressive rock, new wave, new age, and punk rock, using electric mandolins, violins, drum machines, and a variety of effects and sonic devices. He wrote, played, and produced most of the material on his solo albums by himself, though he also worked with producers Daniel Lanois, Steve Hillage, and Bill Nelson.

=== First group ===
Before working as a solo artist, Nash recorded an unreleased song called "Slasher" with a group called Breathless, which also included his (and FM's) future producer, Michael Waite on bass guitar. The song appeared on a "various artists" promotional album titled Concept (after the Toronto-based management company, Concept 376; this was one of a series of such albums), but was not issued to the public in any form. The promo album does not list the group's personnel, or even a songwriting credit, but Nash is clearly heard singing a song, beginning with the lyrics "Hear the children of the night" (though this was a completely different song from his later work, "Children of the Night"), and playing electric violin. The song also featured a complex organ solo not in Nash's usual style (nor that of Cameron Hawkins, his bandmate in FM).

=== First solo career and film work ===
Nash's first solo performance and live presentation of music to film occurred when he played his soundtrack to Luis Buñuel's silent film Un chien andalou (1929) at The Original 99 Cent Roxy Theatre in Toronto on March 17, 1975.

=== Silent film composition ===
He also composed music for other classic silent films including Nosferatu (1922) and The Cabinet of Dr. Caligari (1920). When performing soundtracks, Nash would appear on stage beside the screen (using his own projection screen when a full theatre screen is not available), the same format he used when performing concerts. He also composed scores for modern Canadian films Roadkill (1990) and Highway 61 (1991), both directed by Bruce McDonald. His other movie score and soundtrack work included the short film A Trip Around Lake Ontario (1985), The Kidnapping of the President (1980), Black Pearls (1989), and Blood and Donuts (1995).

During this time, Nash made his first appearance on record, on David Pritchard's solo album Nocturnal Earthworm Stew (1976), with a short solo track titled "Nash Metropolitan" (named after Nash Metropolitan), and on an improvised piece with Pritchard and drummer Martin Deller (with whom he would later work in FM). He also appeared on the live TV-Ontario program Nightmusic (before its change in format, where it became Nightmusic Concert); in this incarnation, the show was a televised version of an FM radio show hosted by disc jockey Reiner Schwarz, and had not previously featured a live performer. Nash claimed he was both the first and last musical artist to appear on the show.

=== Work with FM ===
After working as a solo artist for a year, Nash formed the group FM in 1976, initially as a duo with Cameron Hawkins; drummer Martin Deller was added later. The group began recording in July 1976, though no performances in its duo format were issued at the time. However, they did appear on television and in live concerts, beginning in November 1976. In 1977, with Deller added to the group, they recorded the album Black Noise, which received a gold record award. It was listed as one of the "Top 50 Prog Rock Albums" by Rolling Stone magazine. By the end of 1977, Nash had left FM, and resumed his solo career starting with another television appearance on Nightmusic Concert on February 28, 1978. Nash rejoined FM from 1983 to 1989, and again from 1994 to 1996. During these years, he recorded a further three albums with the group. FM also recorded three albums during Nash's absence (1977 to 1980), with Ben Mink as his replacement.

=== Late 1970s and 1980 ===
Nash had intended to restart his solo career in 1978 with a new album featuring all the music from his Nightmusic Concert TV special, plus his soundtrack for Un chien andalou, but found the sound quality of a test pressing to be unsatisfactory, so he issued a four-song 12-inch EP titled Bedside Companion instead, on his own label, Cut-throat Records, which he continued to operate for the rest of his life. A full album, Dreams and Nightmares with the rest of the Nightmusic material, the soundtrack, and a few new songs, appeared the following year. All music from these records was instrumental, and both are now available on one CD titled Blind Windows which also includes the 45 rpm EP playing at 33 rpm as the "Marsden versions", a joking reference to disc jockey David Marsden who mistakenly played the entire record at the wrong speed on radio when it was released.

Also in 1979, Nash thanked Toronto radio station CFNY-FM for their support of his music, by playing electric violin on the station's theme song, which was recorded by various disc jockeys of the station in a strange blend of new wave and country music. It was released as "Working on the Radio" by the 102.1 Band, as a single on Ready Records. The B-side has an extended version with a longer solo by Nash, who is not credited on the cover.

Nash's solo career up to this point had only a small cult following, due to his working exclusively as an instrumentalist. His next record, a 1980 single featuring a cover version of Jan and Dean's "Dead Man's Curve" with vocals, propelled him to greater public recognition. The B-side, "Swing Shift (Souixante-Neuf)" also featured vocals, and was co-composed with lyricist Toby Dammit, with whom Nash further collaborated over the next few years. Music videos were made for both songs.

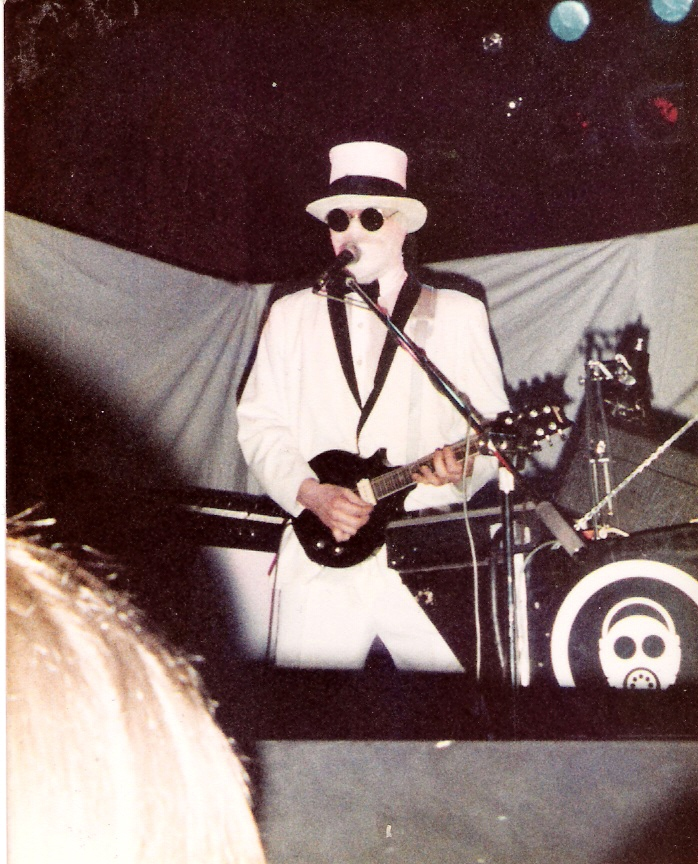
Nash the Slash performing at The Venue in London in 1981

Nash also played on three songs by Toronto group Drastic Measures for their self-titled album, including violins on their signature tune, a cover version of the children's song, "The Teddy Bears' Picnic". Nash's label, Cut-throat Records, later issued a single by the group, the only other artist to appear on his label, although Nash was not involved in its recording. Nash's later soundtrack album for Highway 61 includes tracks by Tony Malone, the lead singer for Drastic Measures.

Nash was invited by Gary Numan to tour the UK as his support act in 1980 and 1981, and subsequently played on Numan's 1981 LP Dance. He also toured Europe with The Tubes. He was signed to the Dindisc label and in 1981, he released the album Children of the Night in Europe, also released in Canada shortly after. Several British singles were also issued. These records appeared on the Dindisc / Cut-throat label in Europe and on Virgin / Dindisc / Cut-throat in Canada.

=== Mid 1980s ===
Returning to Toronto in spring 1981, Nash released an instrumental "mini-album" Decomposing (1981), which purported to be playable at any speed, with song timings on the label quoting three lengths, depending on whether the record is played at 33, 45, or 78 RPM. However, songs from this record also appeared on compilation albums and singles, where they always play as heard when Decomposing is played at 45 rpm. The EP was reissued on vinyl, CD and download in 2017 by Toronto label Artoffact Records, with the CD and download containing the four songs as they sound at 45, 33 and 78 RPM, in that order.

In 1981, Iggy Pop name-checked Nash during the fade-out on the song Eggs on Plate singing "Hey Nash the Slash, why did you leave your sticker on the ceiling of my forty-two dollar and fifty cent motel suite?!" A year later, Nash got a call from Iggy who invited him to be his opening act on tour.

Nash's next album was And You Thought You Were Normal (1982). This included the track "Dance After Curfew" produced by Daniel Lanois prior to his association with Brian Eno. The single became a surprise club and radio hit in Poland, which was then still behind the iron curtain, where curfews and restrictions on western culture were imposed by the government of the time. A 12-inch single featuring a remixed and extended version of the song was issued in the USA on PVC Records.

Nash's next project was an album of American rock classics titled American Band-ages. Nash enlisted the help of his former FM collaborators Cameron Hawkins (keyboards) and Martin Deller (drums), and the album was released in 1984. The album was aimed at the US market, but due to distribution and management problems, including a change in record labels (to MCA, after Quality Records folded in 1985), it never got the exposure Nash thought it deserved. In the same year, Nash released a compilation album (with most tracks remixed) titled The Million Year Picnic on Ralph Records in the United States, the label which was home to The Residents.

While working on American Band-ages in 1983, he proposed to promote it with a double bill tour with his former band FM. But Ben Mink, Nash's replacement, had left the band that year; therefore, Nash rejoined the group, staying with them from 1983 to 1989 (followed by a reunion tour from 1994 to 1996), and retaining the idea of a double bill by performing solo as the opening act. With Nash, FM released further albums: Con-Test (1985), Tonight (1987), and RetroActive (1995).

In 1985, Nash sued PepsiCo for using his likeness in commercials without permission; PepsiCo subsequently settled out of court, pulling the commercial from broadcast and paying Nash's legal fees.

=== 1990–2011 ===
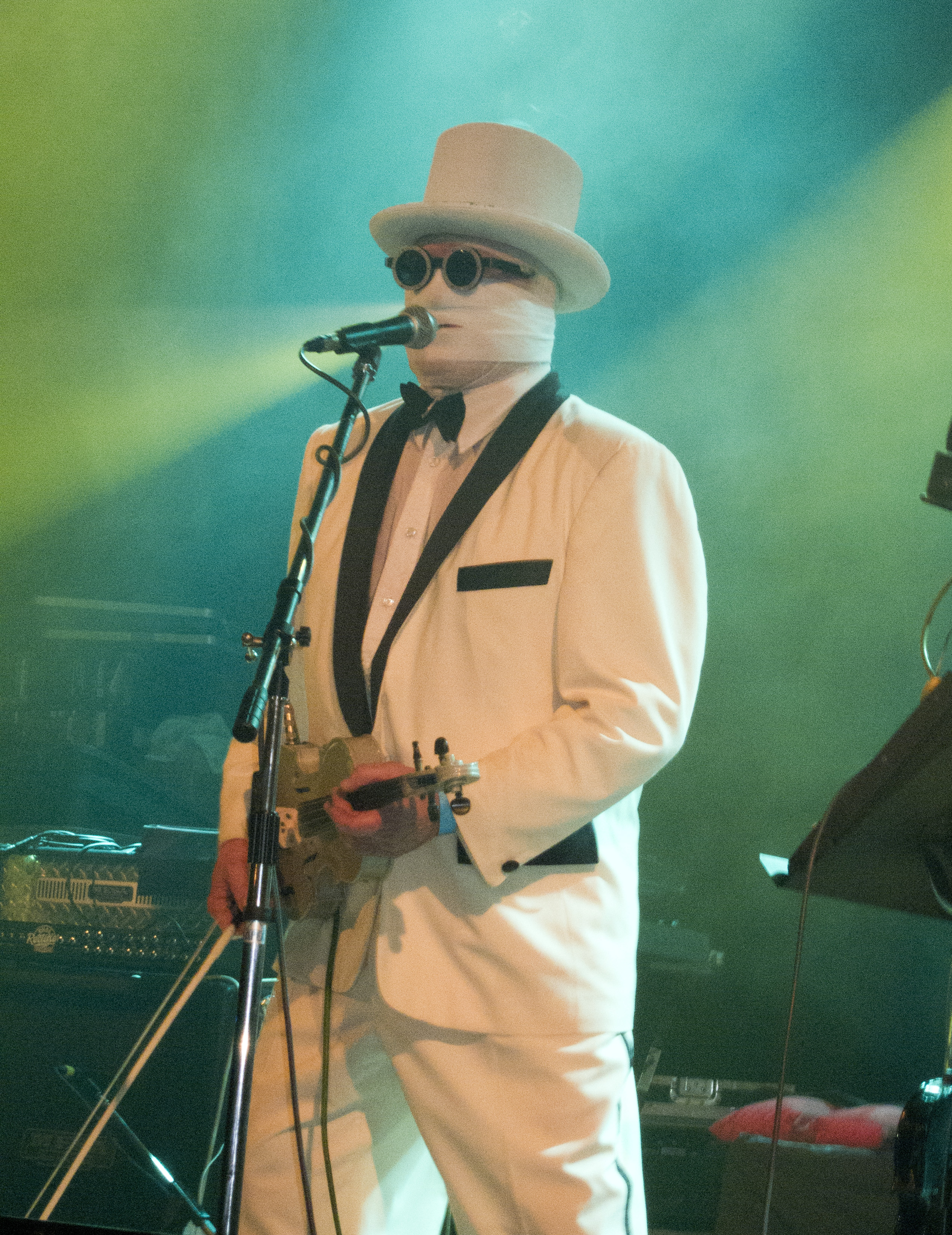
Nash the Slash in 2010

After the break-up of FM in 1989, Nash embarked on a series of film soundtrack projects, and revived his Cut-throat label in 1991 to issue these on CD, and has also used it to re-issue his earlier records. New albums of songs with vocals have also been released on the label: Thrash (1999) and In-A-Gadda-Da-Nash (2008), the latter consisting entirely of cover versions.

During 1992–1993, Nash the Slash collaborated with the electronic music artist Plexus to create a series of visually intense live shows called Psychedelitron. They performed Psychedelitron live between 1993 and 1995. In 1993, the show was performed only at Stratenger's in Toronto, Canada, every third Saturday of the month from March to October. The performed two sets, each a mix of Nash the Slash and Plexus songs. Later, in 1994 and 1995, they took the show to other venues, including the grand opening of the Toronto Public Library at 239 College Street to commemorate the inclusion of the Merril Collection of Science Fiction, Speculation & Fantasy in this library location.

Psychedelitron used intense visuals, including a refinement of Nash's psychedelic projector lighting, strategically placed pin lights to increase the perception of the stage size, strobe lights, fog and indirect and silhouette lighting. The techniques used during Psychedelitron, and their subsequent refinement during the reign of the shows became an important visual aspect to Nash's later shows. Psychedelitron was also used as way to re-define Nash's shows both visually and musically.

In 1998, Nash performed as part of Toronto's Pride Week, publicly acknowledging that he was gay.

During 2004 and 2005, he was again working with Robert Vanderhorst, under the name Two Artists, on the project View From the Gallery, a live multimedia event presenting a fusion of surrealistic visuals with classic stylings in music.

Nash appeared as a character in several comic books by Matt Howarth, including issues #2–7 of Savage Henry. Nash also provided original music on a CD for Howarth's graphic novel The Simultaneous Man.

Nash continued to tour, mostly in his native Ontario, but occasionally elsewhere, including a 2008 tour of the UK, which resulted in a live CD/DVD.

2011 saw Nash release his first ever compilation album, The Reckless Use of Electricity.

=== 2012 ===
Nash announced his retirement via his website on November 6, 2012, stating he was "rolling up the bandages" and shutting down his official website on December 31. He thanked his loyal fans for their support during his 40 years as an independent artist, but stated that live gigs no longer excited him and that his "eccentric style/genre finds no place into today's scene." He also mentioned the "theft of music on the internet devastated a very important source of [his] income."

== Death ==
On May 10, 2014, Nash died at his home in Toronto, at age 66, from a suspected heart attack. Robert Vanderhorst confirmed his death to the media two days later.

=== Legacy ===
Since his death in 2014, Nash the Slash's career and recordings are being preserved by The Nash the Slash Legacy. His website was relaunched late in 2014, and costumes and instruments were donated to the National Music Centre in Calgary. He was declared a Canadian Innovator by NMC and his Vladimir Bosnar custom skull mandolin is on display in the Canadian Music Hall of Fame wing. A distribution deal was signed with Artoffact Records in Toronto in early 2015 to release all six of his albums from the 1980s - Bedside Companion, Dreams and Nightmares, Children of the Night, the rare and previously commercially unreleased live album Hammersmith Holocaust, Decomposing, as well as And You Thought You Were Normal. Artoffact re-released them, plus a download of the "Dead Man's Curve" single, on CD, vinyl and download between 2016-2017. As of 2024, all the physical releases are out of print, but the downloads of all of these titles except Children were still available on Bandcamp.

Filming began on a Nash the Slash documentary in early 2017. The film is produced by Side Three Media in collaboration with The Nash the Slash Legacy and is called Nash the Slash Rises Again! The film premiered at the 2025 Doc'n Roll Film Festival in the United Kingdom.

His white tuxedo and top hat will be on display to the public and are being loaned to the Canadian Museum of History in Gatineau, Quebec, for a 2018 exhibit about popular music in Canada from the 1960s to 1980s.

== Discography ==
=== Studio albums and EPs ===
- Bedside Companion (EP) (1978)
- Dreams & Nightmares (1979)
- Children of the Night (1981)
- Decomposing (EP) (1981)
- And You Thought You Were Normal (1982)
- American Band-ages (1984) (#79 in Canada)
- Highway 61 (soundtrack) (1991)
- Thrash (1999)
- Nosferatu (soundtrack) (2000)
- In-A-Gadda-Da-Nash (2008)

The 2001 recording Lost in Space is credited to Nash the Slash, Cameron Hawkins and Martin Deller; it is actually a CD by FM, but avoids using the name for legal reasons.

=== Live recordings ===
- Hammersmith Holocaust (1980) {EP, live in London, 300 copies made}
- Live in London 2008 (2009) - CD-R

=== Compilations ===
- The Million Year Picnic (1984) (Ralph Records)
- Blind Windows (1997) (compiles Bedside Companion and Dreams & Nightmares onto one CD)
- The Reckless Use Of Electricity (2011)

=== Singles ===
- Cut-throat / CUT 3 - "Dead Man's Curve" / "Swing Shift", 1980 (Canada only)
- Cut-throat / Dindisc / Virgin VS-1126 – "Dead Man's Curve" / "Metropolis", 1981 – B-side is an extended version
- Cut-throat / Dindisc DIN-28 – "Dead Man's Curve" / "Reactor No. 2", 1981 – B-side was a non-album track until CD re-release
- Cut-throat / Dindisc DIN-29 – "19th Nervous Breakdown" / "Danger Zone", 1981
- Dindisc DIN-33 – "Novel Romance" / "In a Glass Eye", 1981 – A-side produced by Bill Nelson and is a non-album track
- PVC Records PVC4905 - "Dance After Curfew" / "Wonmble/The Calling" - 1982, 12" vinyl single
- Quality Records - "1984" (Radio Version) / "1984" (Dance Version) - released 1984 on 7" & 12" vinyl single
- Quality Records Q2448 - "American Band" / "American Bandstand Boogie/American Band" - 7" vinyl single

=== Film soundtracks ===
In addition to the soundtrack albums above, Nash has composed the film scores for several films, including:

- The Kidnapping of the President (1980) - Nash provided electronic sound effects
- A Trip Around Lake Ontario (1984, short subject)
- Roadkill (1989)
- Black Pearls (1991)
- Blood and Donuts (1995)

Excerpts from tracks on the FM album Tonight, co-written by Nash the Slash, appear in Friday the 13th Part VII: The New Blood.

Nash is also credited with 'original music by' in at least one episode of Cold Blood/True Crime Scene (Canadian TV series 2008–12).

== Movie / video appearances ==
Nash has a cameo appearance in the 1989 film Roadkill, playing his own composition "We Will Be The Leaders".

He also has a cameo in the Spoons video "Tell No Lies" (1984).

== DVDs ==
- Live in London 2008 (2009) - DVD-R

As "Two Artists", a collaboration with artist Robert Vanderhorst:

- View From the Gallery - One (2004)
- View From the Gallery - Two (2005)

Nash also released three live performances on video tape, which are out of print.
