= Electric mandolin =

Stringed musical instrument

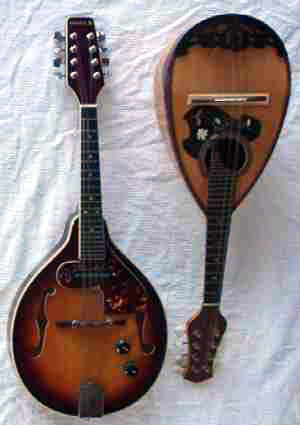
Electric mandolin (left) and traditional

The electric mandolin is an instrument tuned and played as the mandolin and amplified in similar fashion to an electric guitar. As with electric guitars, electric mandolins take many forms. Most common is a carved-top eight-string instrument fitted with an electric pickup in similar fashion to many archtop semi-acoustic guitars. Solid body mandolins are common in 4-, 5-, and 8-string forms. Acoustic electric mandolins also exist in many forms.

== History ==
Electric mandolins were built in the United States as early as the late 1920s. Among the first companies to produce them were Stromberg-Voisinet, Electro (which later became Rickenbacker), Vivi-Tone, and National. Gibson and Vega introduced their electric mandolins in 1936.

In the United States, luthier/inventor Paul Bigsby began building solid-body electric mandolins (technically, they consisted of a solid wood core housing the electronics, with hollow wings forming the body) in 1949. His first one had ten strings and was built for Al Giddings. Bigsby's most famous mandolin, built in 1952, was owned and played by Western swing musician Tiny Moore. This instrument had five single courses rather than the more common four double courses, and was patterned after a similar instrument built by Jim Harvey of La Jolla, California, for a player named Scotty Broyles. Gibson and Rickenbacker introduced solid-body eight-string mandolins in the 1950s, while Fender followed the single-course idea with its four-string version.

A related instrument, the Bahian guitar, was developed in Brazil beginning in the 1940s by musicians Adolfo Antônio do Nascimento (Dodô) and Osmar Álvares Macedo (Osmar). Bahian guitars typically have a solid body and four or five strings tuned in fifths, but are considered to be electric versions of the cavaquinho rather than the mandolin which is why they used to be called originally electric cavaquinho (or cavaquinho elétrico in Portuguese). Virtuoso mandolin player Armandinho (Armando Macedo), son of Osmar, one of the inventors of the "trio eletrico," the moving stage that gave an identity to Carnival in Bahia, Brazil, added the fifth string to the Bahian Guitar and named it so. The Bahian Guitar evolved and is played in a very different way from the electric mandolins in the United States.

== Solid-body electric mandolins ==
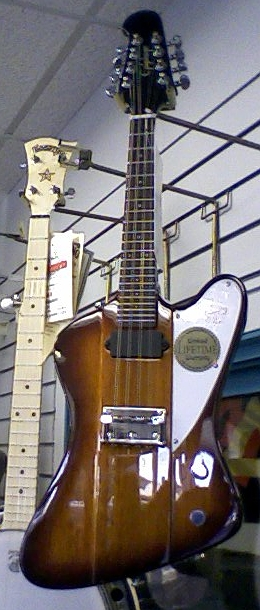
Epiphone's Mandobird solid body electric mandolin

Both four-string single-course and eight-string double-course solid body mandolins have been produced by several makers, as well as five-string models combining the tonal ranges of the mandola and mandolin.

From 1956 to 1976, Fender produced a four-string version, the Fender Electric Mandolin with a body shape was based loosely on the Stratocaster, popularly nicknamed the "Mandocaster". In 2013, Fender reissued it as the Mando-Strat in both four- and eight-string models.

Gibson manufactured the EM-200 solid-body electric mandolin from 1954 to 1971. They recently produced a solid-body mandolin known as the Mandobird, based on the Gibson Firebird body and sold under the Epiphone label, in both four- and eight-string versions.

Eastwood Guitars manufactures a solid-body eight-string electric mandolin as the "Mandocaster" with a Telecaster-style body and two single-coil pickups, as well as a four-string Mandostang as part of their line of Warren Ellis-endorsed instruments.

== Players ==
While the electric mandolin has increased in popularity along with its acoustic cousin, there are still relatively few recordings featuring it as a lead instrument on more than a song or two. The following artists have issued full-length recordings prominently featuring an electric mandolin throughout:

- John Abercrombie (jazz/fusion)
- Tiny Moore (Western swing)
- Yank Rachell (blues)
- John Kruth (eclectic instrumental folk/rock/jazz)
- Mark Heard (singer-songwriter/Americana)
- Michael Kang/String Cheese Incident (jam band)
- Uppalapu Srinivas (Carnatic Classical Music)
- Warren Ellis (alternative rock/folk)
- Nash the Slash (rock/electronica)
- Kevin Jonas (rock/pop)
- Ben Mink (rock/pop)
- Charles O'Connor of Horslips (celtic rock)
- Sierra Hull (Americana/Bluegrass)
