= Bones season 11 =

Bones
- Season 11
- Season 11 DVD cover art
- No. of episodes: 22

Release
- Original network: Fox
- Original release: October 1, 2015 – July 21, 2016

Season chronology
- ← Previous; Season 10 Next → Season 12

The eleventh season of the American television series Bones premiered on October 1, 2015, on Fox and concluded on July 21, 2016. The show maintained its timeslot, airing on Thursdays at 8:00 pm ET.

== Cast and characters ==
=== Main cast ===
- Emily Deschanel as Dr. Temperance "Bones" Brennan, a forensic anthropologist at the Jeffersonian, and wife of Seeley Booth
- David Boreanaz as FBI Special Agent Seeley Booth and husband of Temperance Brennan
- Michaela Conlin as Angela Montenegro, a forensic artist and wife of Jack Hodgins
- Tamara Taylor as Dr. Camille Saroyan, a forensic pathologist and the head of the forensic division
- T. J. Thyne as Dr. Jack Hodgins, an entomologist, mineralogist, palynologist, and forensic chemist, and husband of Angela Montenegro.
- John Boyd as James Aubrey, an FBI agent who works under Booth

=== Recurring cast ===
- Patricia Belcher as Caroline Julian, a prosecutor who often works with the team
- Ryan O'Neal as Max Brennan, Temperance's father
- Gil Darnell as Sebastian Kohl, a famous photographer who mentors Angela, and Cam's boyfriend
- Sunnie Pelant as Christine Booth, Seeley and Temperance's daughter
- Sara Rue as Karen Delfs, a behavioral analyst
- Kim Raver as Grace Miller, an FBI special agent
- Dilshad Vadsaria as Padme Dalaj, Jared Booth's wife
- Gavin MacIntosh as Parker Booth, Seeley's son
- Eric Millegan as Dr. Zack Addy, former Jeffersonian employee

Interns

- Carla Gallo as Daisy Wick
- Eugene Byrd as Dr. Clark Edison
- Michael Grant Terry as Wendell Bray
- Pej Vahdat as Dr. Arastoo Vaziri
- Brian Klugman as Dr. Oliver Wells
- Ignacio Serricchio as Rodolfo Fuentes
- Laura Spencer as Jessica Warren
- Joel David Moore as Dr. Colin Fisher

== Production ==
The series was renewed for an eleventh season by Fox on May 8, 2015. Writers Michael Peterson and Jonathan Collier took over the role of showrunner for the eleventh season after executive producer and writer Stephen Nathan stepped down from the position after season 10, to work on other projects. However, Nathan plans to return to the series later in the season. Randy Zisk joined as an executive producer and assumed the role of the series' directing producer, previous held by Ian Toynton since the beginning of the series. In July 2015, it was announced that Bones would crossover with fellow Fox series Sleepy Hollow in a two-part episode, which aired on October 29, 2015, and featured guest appearances by Tom Mison and Nicole Beharie. Filming began on August 3, 2015. Kim Raver was cast as FBI Special Agent Grace Miller and appears in the first two episodes of the season. Betty White guest stars in an episode, playing Dr. Beth Mayer, a forensic anthropologist. In November 2015, it was announced that Sara Rue had been cast in a multi-episode arc as a behavioral analyst who works with Booth.

== Episodes ==
No. overall	No. in season	Title	Directed by	Written by	Original release date	Prod. code	US viewers (millions)
213	1	"The Loyalty in the Lie"	Randy Zisk	Jonathan Collier	October 1, 2015	BAKY01	6.20
It has been six months since Booth and Brennan quit their respective jobs with the FBI and the Jeffersonian. Brennan has given birth to her and Booth second baby; he now trains new FBI recruits. The Jeffersonian team uncover a body burned in a van and originally confirm it to be Booth's as his gun was found at the scene and after examining the remains. Brennan goes to the Jeffersonian to do her own confirmation and uncovers evidence that it is not Booth's. Agent Aubrey is forced to work with Agent Miller from Internal Investigations and she dismisses Booth's disappearance and adds him to the suspect list for the murder. Brennan soon discovers the body is of Jared Booth, Seeley's brother. Aubrey and Miller visit Kevin O'Donnell, a close friend of Jared's, but he is not cooperative. The team discover that Booth and four others were tracking down a drug lord. The FBI search the drug lord’s house and find three men dead in the main office and the safe empty. They later confirm Booth was present at the scene as much of his blood was found there. Caroline learns that Agent Miller has been keeping a secret from Aubrey, that her partner is also missing and Caroline advises Aubrey to investigate. Booth tends to his wounds and it is revealed he is working with Kevin and two others and that they have $2 million in cash from the safe.
214	2	"The Brother in the Basement"	Dwight Little	Michael Peterson	October 8, 2015	BAKY02	5.90
In a flashback, Booth, Kevin, and the others destroy the evidence and burn the van with Jared's body inside. Booth insists he must be the one to do it. In the present, Agent Miller admits to Aubrey and Caroline that her partner, Richard, who went missing had a printed list of undercover FBI agents. The team discover a severed finger of Richard's fiancée, Chloe, in his freezer, and that she is missing and was being held for ransom for the list. After recovering evidence, the team discover the bodies of Richard and Chloe. At the Jeffersonian, Dr. Benjamin Metzger, a digital forensic scientist for the FBI arrives. However, evidence points to Metzger being the one who killed Richard and Chloe to get the list. Brennan is able to get Booth's location from Metzger. At the warehouse, Booth continues to struggle with his wound as the gang waits to sell the list for $4 million. Kevin gets a text from Metzger that says Booth is FBI and that he must kill him or the deal is off. Kevin does not want to kill Booth, but when the other two men discover this, a fight ensues. Booth is able to take the two men out and escape the building. The SWAT team arrives and Booth is reunited with Brennan. He later recovers in the hospital. Meanwhile, Arastoo and Cam break-up as he wants to move on, since Brennan has returned to the Jeffersonian, displacing him, and that jobs he would take would require Cam to leave the Jeffersonian and he does not want her to resent him.
215	3	"The Donor in the Drink"	Michael Lange	Hilary Weisman Graham	October 15, 2015	BAKY03	5.79
Booth and Brennan return to their respective jobs at the FBI and the Jeffersonian. They investigate the death of a man found in a fish farm whose organs had been harvested and sold on the black market. Booth readjusts to work back at the FBI, where Aubrey has taken over his office, and is frustrated that his brother's ashes are missing. Meanwhile, Hodgins encourages Angela to show off her photography work.
216	4	"The Carpals in the Coy-Wolves"	Randy Zisk	Gene Hong	October 22, 2015	BAKY04	6.06
The team investigates the death of a man whose remains were destroyed by coywolves and learn that he was involved in a competitive fantasy football league, to which several of the suspects are linked. Brennan enlists the help of fellow forensic anthropologist Dr Beth Mayer (Betty White), who makes several contributions to the case. Meanwhile, Brennan tells Booth that she plans on killing off the character based on him in her latest novel, much to his annoyance, and intern Dr Oliver Wells reveals to Hodgins that he's dealing with erectile dysfunction and seeks advice.
217	5	"The Resurrection in the Remains"	Chad Lowe	Mary Trahan	October 29, 2015	BAKY05	6.57
In a crossover with Sleepy Hollow, the Jeffersonian team find a headless corpse in a church during Halloween and are assisted by FBI agent Abbie Mills (Nicole Beharie) and Ichabod Crane (Tom Mison). They discover the victim is 200 years old and is linked to their current murder investigation regarding a medical student. The crossover concludes in the season 3 episode of Sleepy Hollow, "Dead Men Tell No Tales", which features appearances by Brennan and Booth.
218	6	"The Senator in the Street Sweeper"	Steve Robin	Emily Silver	November 5, 2015	BAKY06	5.34
The death of a U.S. Senator leads Booth and Brennan to investigate Capitol Hill, with suspects including his wife and the majority whip (Brenda Strong). Meanwhile, Caroline has Aubrey do a background check on intern Jessica, stating it is due to the high-level nature of the case when it is really just to look out for Aubrey. Aubrey discovers things from her past, but they continue their relationship anyway. Also, Aubrey tells Booth about his political ambitions to be a Senator in ten years.
219	7	"The Promise in the Palace"	Jeannot Szwarc	Joe Hortua	November 12, 2015	BAKY07	5.16
The death of an escape artist whose remains are found in the woods leads Booth and Brennan to investigate the Magic Palace, the place where the victim worked, and various suspects within the magic community. Meanwhile, Sebastian Kohl returns to work with Angela on her photography and he later asks out Cam, but she isn't sure if she's ready for a relationship after her break-up with Arastoo.
220	8	"High Treason in the Holiday Season"	Anne Renton	Jon Cowan	November 19, 2015	BAKY08	5.25
The team investigate the death of a political journalist who published documents exposing corruption in the NSA. The killer is revealed to be the journalist's source for the documents who is also arrested for treason. Meanwhile, Booth's son Parker returns from London, and the Jeffersonian team celebrate Thanksgiving together.
221	9	"The Cowboy in the Contest"	Chad Lowe	Karine Rosenthal	December 10, 2015	BAKY09	4.63
Booth and Brennan go undercover as Buck and Wanda at a role-playing Old West-style shooting competition. While trying to catch a killer, they also go against one another in the shooting competitions. Meanwhile, Cam continues her relationship with Sebastian and Hodgins reveals to Angela that he's not ready for more children and is happy with the family he has.
222	10	"The Doom in the Boom"	Michael Lange	Keith Foglesong	December 10, 2015	BAKY10	4.42
The body of a police officer rigged with a bomb detonates at a crime scene, killing several police officers and significantly injuring both Aubrey and Hodgins. While Hodgins seemingly recuperates quickly, Aubrey is in more critical condition, requiring surgery. Booth is joined by behavioral analyst Karen Delfs who assists with the case and Arastoo returns to the Jeffersonian to help as well after hearing what happened. After solving the case, Arastoo confesses to Cam that he still loves her and Hodgins collapses in the lab. At the hospital, the team is informed that Hodgins is paralyzed due to the trauma he suffered from the bomb explosion.
223	11	"The Death in the Defense"	Arlene Sanford	Kendall Sand	April 14, 2016	BAKY11	4.40
Eight weeks after the bomb attack, Hodgins returns to the Jeffersonian in a wheelchair, eager to get back to work. Despite his helpfulness with the case, Cam decides to send him home so his work does not interfere with his recovery. However, she later reconsiders her decision and lets him return. Hodgins later receives a call from his doctor telling him he will never walk again and hides this from Angela. Brennan and Booth investigate the death of a public defender who had multiple prior clients with motive to kill her.
224	12	"The Murder of the Meninist"	Ian Toynton	Hilary Weisman Graham	April 21, 2016	BAKY12	4.38
The team investigates the death of a man who founded a men's rights organization. Brennan assaults a suspect, the organization's co-founder, after he makes misogynist comments towards her. Hodgins' bitter attitude towards his paralysis strains both the environment in the lab and his relationship with Angela.
225	13	"The Monster in the Closet"	Randy Zisk	Michael Peterson	April 28, 2016	BAKY13	4.38
The dead body of a social worker found in a park reveals clues suggesting that the killer lived with the body for months before dumping it and the discovery of a similar set of remains confirms it's a serial killer who uses the corpses as marionettes. Booth and Aubrey consult behavioral analyst Karen Delfs for clues and Cam rethinks her love life when Arastoo comes back to the lab.
226	14	"The Last Shot at a Second Chance"	David Grossman	Emily Silver	May 5, 2016	BAKY14	4.29
A female ex-con is found after a mudslide and Booth discovers that one of the suspects is someone he met while in prison. Brennan attends a hearing after punching a suspect (from "The Murder of the Meninist") and receives six months of probation with Booth as her probation officer. Meanwhile, Hodgins and Angela take a step in repairing their marriage and Aubrey and Jessica continue their relationship.
227	15	"The Fight in the Fixer"	Silver Tree	Joe Hortua	May 12, 2016	BAKY15	4.26
When a body is found in the Potomac, the team discovers that the victim is both a private investigator and a fixer, making the suspect pool much larger. Hodgins is returning to his old self, but Angela thinks he is trying too hard and Aubrey is surprised when Karen Delfs suddenly asks him out. Brennan makes a bet with Oliver Wells when Christine is suspected of cheating on her report card. Later, Aubrey finds out that his father is back and has started an investigation into his own son.
228	16	"The Strike in the Chord"	Michael Lange	Yael Zinkow	May 19, 2016	BAKY16	4.29
When a collegiate a cappella singer is found in a rat lab, Booth looks at other members of the group and a rival group for suspects. Brennan gets a new intern, but is irritated after the intern makes numerous mistakes, while Hodgins signs up for experimental surgery in an effort to walk again. After the case is solved, the team learns that Aubrey also sang a cappella in college. This episode features Kirstin Maldonado, Mitch Grassi, and Scott Hoying of Pentatonix, as well as singers Sam Tsui and Jordan Fisher.
229	17	"The Secret in the Service"	Dwight Little	Kandall Sand & Mary Trahan	May 26, 2016	BAKY17	4.63
A body found in the woods is identified as a Secret Service agent, which leads everyone to wonder if the murder was personal or an attempt to target the President. Aubrey is given a new partner when the Secret Service prevent Booth's involvement due to being a seven generation removed relation to the 19th century assassin, John Wilkes Booth. Fisher returns to lead the forensic side when Brennan is stuck at home with a cold.
230	18	"The Movie in the Making"	Randy Zisk	Keith Foglesong	June 2, 2016	BAKY18	4.61
A documentary crew follows the team around as they solve the murder of a man found in a landfill after a decade. Meanwhile, Arastoo tries to hide his feelings for Cam from the cameras, but Cam confesses her love and proposes to him, which he accepts.
231	19	"The Head in the Abutment"	Ian Toynton	Gene Hong	June 16, 2016	BAKY19	3.94
Booth and Brennan are in the middle of spring cleaning when the decapitated body of a hockey player is found in the Anacostia River. Meanwhile, Oliver and Hodgins get competitive when Oliver beats Hodgins in a video game. Later, Booth settles an old score with a goalie against whom he played in high school.
232	20	"The Stiff in the Cliff"	Jeannot Szwarc	Kathy Reichs & Kerry Reichs	June 23, 2016	BAKY20	4.51
The frozen body of billionaire explorer Henry Charles is brought to the Jeffersonian and the team is surprised when they discover Clark Edison was part of his last expedition 15 years ago and dismayed when he later becomes a suspect. Cam's sister Felicia returns to plan most of Cam's wedding and Cam struggles to keep quiet about her own wants to prevent any arguments.
233	21	"The Jewel in the Crown"	David Grossman	Jon Cowan	July 14, 2016	BAKY21	4.36
A French inspector works with the team as they investigate a body found at a glass recycling plant with a diamond in its jaw. Meanwhile, Hodgins continues his physical therapy and has a breakthrough when he unknowingly knocks over objects in the lab due to a muscle spasm in his leg. Booth is diagnosed with a temporary eye condition and needs glasses.
234	22	"The Nightmare within the Nightmare"	David Boreanaz	Michael Peterson	July 21, 2016	BAKY22	3.74
The team continues their search for the serial killer known as "The Puppeteer", while Brennan is troubled by her belief that she could have caught the killer without her brief period of retirement and suffers from nightmares and a loss of sleep. After gathering various clues and pieces of evidence, Booth realizes who it is. Brennan is kidnapped by an unknown figure, later revealed to be Zack Addy.

== DVD release ==
The eleventh season of Bones was released on DVD (subtitled "Death and Disappearance Edition") in region 1 on January 3, 2017. The set includes all 22 episodes of season eleven and special features include deleted scenes and a gag reel.
