= List of Bones characters =

This is a list of fictional characters in the American police procedural television series Bones. The article deals with the series' main, recurring, and minor characters.

The series' main characters consists of the fictional Jeffersonian Institute's forensic anthropology department staff members Dr. Temperance Brennan, Dr. Camille Saroyan, Angela Montenegro, Dr. Jack Hodgins, and the interns Zack Addy, Clark Edison, Wendall Bray, Arastoo Vaziri, Daisy Wick, and Vincent Nigel-Murray; FBI agents Seeley Booth, Dr. Lance Sweets, and James Aubrey; and the United States Department of Justice prosecutor Caroline Julian.

== Character overview ==
Character	Portrayed by	Seasons											
Character	Portrayed by	1	2	3	4	5	6	7	8	9	10	11	12
Main characters
Temperance "Bones" Brennan	Emily Deschanel	Main	Main	Main	Main	Main	Main	Main	Main	Main	Main	Main	Main
Seeley Booth	David Boreanaz	Main	Main	Main	Main	Main	Main	Main	Main	Main	Main	Main	Main
Angela Montenegro	Michaela Conlin	Main	Main	Main	Main	Main	Main	Main	Main	Main	Main	Main	Main
Jack Hodgins	T. J. Thyne	Main	Main	Main	Main	Main	Main	Main	Main	Main	Main	Main	Main
Zack Addy	Eric Millegan	Main	Main	Main	S.G	S.G						S.G	S.G
Daniel Goodman	Jonathan Adams	M											
Camille Saroyan	Tamara Taylor		Main (Note: Tamara Taylor was a recurring cast member until season 2, episode 7, "The Girl with the Curl".)	Main	Main	Main	Main	Main	Main	Main	Main	Main	Main
Lance Sweets	John Francis Daley			Main (Note: John Francis Daley appears as a series regular from season 3, episode 9, "The Santa in the Slush" through season 10, episode 1, "The Conspiracy in the Corpse". From season 3 episode 4, "The Secret in the Soil" through season 3, episode 8, "The Knight on the Grid" he appears as a recurring guest star.)	Main	Main	Main	Main	Main	Main	Main		
James Aubrey	John Boyd										Main (Note: John Boyd is credited as "starring" from season 10, episode 2, "The Lance to the Heart".)	Main	Main
Recurring characters
Caroline Julian	Patricia Belcher	G	Recurring	Recurring	Recurring	Recurring	Recurring	Recurring	Recurring	Recurring	Recurring	Recurring	Recurring
Parker Booth	Ty Panitz	Recurring	Recurring	Recurring	Recurring	Recurring	Recurring	Recurring		R			
Parker Booth	Gavin MacIntosh											R	R
Russ Brennan	Loren Dean	Recurring	Recurring	Recurring									
Howard Epps	Heath Freeman	R	R										
Oliver Laurier	Chris Conner	R	R										
Tim "Sully" Sullivan	Eddie McClintock		R										G
Gordon Gordon Wyatt	Stephen Fry		Recurring	Recurring	Recurring	Recurring							G
Marcus Geier	David Greenman		Recurring	Recurring	Recurring								
Max Brennan	Ryan O'Neal		Recurring	Recurring	Recurring	Recurring	Recurring	Recurring	Recurring	Recurring	Recurring	Recurring	Recurring
Alex Radziwill	Danny Woodburn		R						R		R		
Clark Edison	Eugene Byrd			Recurring	Recurring	Recurring	Recurring	Recurring	Recurring	Recurring	Recurring	Recurring	Recurring
The Gravedigger / Heather Taffet	Deirdre Lovejoy				Recurring	Recurring	Recurring						
Wendell Bray	Michael Grant Terry				Recurring	Recurring	Recurring	Recurring	Recurring	Recurring	Recurring	Recurring	Recurring
Colin Fisher	Joel David Moore				Recurring	Recurring	Recurring	Recurring	Recurring	Recurring		R	R
Arastoo Vaziri	Pej Vahdat				Recurring	Recurring	Recurring	Recurring	Recurring	Recurring	Recurring	Recurring	Recurring
Daisy Wick	Carla Gallo				Recurring	Recurring	Recurring	Recurring	Recurring	Recurring	Recurring	Recurring	Recurring
Michelle Welton	Dana Davis / Tiffany Hines (Note: Portrayed by Dana Davis in her first appearance and by Tiffany Hines in her subsequent appearances.)				Recurring	Recurring	Recurring	Recurring	Recurring	Recurring			R
Vincent Nigel-Murray	Ryan Cartwright				Recurring	Recurring	Recurring						
Hank Booth	Ralph Waite					G		G		G			
Paul Lidner	Elon Gold					G	R						
Avalon Harmonia	Cyndi Lauper					G			Guest	Guest	Guest		G
Douglas Filmore	Scott Lowell						R	R		R			
Genny Shaw	Tina Majorino						G	R					
Michael Hodgins	Various (Note: Noah/Jared Botwin-Lazarow and Liam James Ramos/Arjuna Maximus McLellan.)						Recurring	Recurring	Recurring	Recurring	Recurring	Recurring	Recurring
Finn Abernathy	Luke Kleintank							Recurring	Recurring	Recurring			
Christine Booth	Ali and Suzanne Hartman							R	R				
Christine Booth	Sunnie Pelant									Recurring	Recurring	Recurring	Recurring
Christopher Pelant	Andrew Leeds							Recurring	Recurring	Recurring	Recurring	Recurring	
Oliver Wells	Brian Klugman								Recurring	Recurring	Recurring	Recurring	
Rodolfo Fuentes	Ignacio Serricchio									Recurring	Recurring	Recurring	Recurring
Jessica Warren	Laura Spencer									Recurring	Recurring	Recurring	Recurring
Dr. Beth Mayer	Betty White											R	R
Karen Delfs	Sara Rue											R	R

== Main characters ==
The following characters have been featured in the opening credits of the program.

=== Temperance "Bones" Brennan ===
Portrayed by Emily Deschanel

Dr. Temperance "Bones" Brennan, PhD.
- Bones character
- First appearance: September 13, 2005 (1x01, "Pilot")
- Last appearance: March 28, 2017 (12x12, "The End in the End")
- Created by: Hart Hanson
- Portrayed by: Emily Deschanel

In-universe information
- Aliases: Wanda Moosejaw; Roxy Scallion; Natasha (of Boris and Natasha)
- Nicknames: Bones (by Seeley & Parker Booth); Tempe (by Max Keenan, Russ Brennan and Jared Booth); Sweetie (by Angela Montenegro); Bren/Dr. B (by some co-workers); Joy (name by birth)
- Gender: Female
- Title: Doctor (triple Ph.D.)
- Occupation: Anthropologist, forensic anthropologist, kinesiologist, author
- Family: Max Keenan (father; deceased); Christine Brennan (mother; deceased); Russ Brennan (brother)
- Spouses: Seeley Booth (husband; 2013–present)
- Children: Christine Angela Booth (daughter; born 2012); Hank Booth II (son; born 2015); Parker Booth (stepson)
- Relatives: Hank Booth (grandfather-in-law); Edwin Booth (father-in-law; deceased); Marianne Booth (mother-in-law); Jared Booth (brother-in-law; deceased); Amy Hollister (sister-in-law); Hayley Hollister (niece); Emma Hollister (niece); Margaret Whitesell (second cousin)
- Home: Washington, D.C.

Dr. Temperance "Bones" Brennan (seasons 1–12) works as a forensic anthropologist at the Jeffersonian Institute in Washington, D.C. and is also a best-selling novelist. She is nicknamed "Bones" by FBI Special Agent Seeley Booth. Brennan and Booth work together on Federal Bureau of Investigation (FBI) cases concerning recently found human remains. Although she is an expert in her field, Brennan is socially awkward and has limited knowledge about pop culture. Her birth name was Joy Keenan, while her brother's birth name was Kyle Keenan; their names were changed by their parents in an effort to protect them from enemies from their past. Brennan's parents left her and her older brother, known as Russ, when she was fifteen. She also thinks herself to be extremely rational. She is not usually (barring a few episodes, such as the "Doctor in the Photo") the one to get the most emotionally attached to the cases and/or the people involved. She and Booth became a couple and have a daughter, Christine, and are later married. In the season 10 episode "The Eye in the Sky", she is revealed to be pregnant again. At the end of season 10, she and Booth quit the team, planning to move away. In the first episode of Season 11, six months have passed and Brennan has given birth to a son named Hank Booth II, after Seeley Booth's grandfather.

=== Seeley Booth ===
Portrayed by David Boreanaz

Seeley Booth
- Bones character
- First appearance: September 13, 2005 (1x01, "Pilot")
- Last appearance: March 28, 2017 (12x12, "The End in the End")
- Created by: Hart Hanson
- Portrayed by: David Boreanaz

In-universe information
- Full name: Seeley Joseph Booth
- Aliases: Buck Moosejaw; Tony Scallion; Bobby Kent; Cee-Lo Booth; Freddy K
- Nicknames: Seeley (by his family, friends and others); Booth (by Temperance "Bones" Brennan and others); Shrimp (by Pops); Sergeant, Sarge (by men in his unit); Boothy; G-Man (by Angela); Cher (by Caroline); Big man (by Cam Saroyan); Mr.B (his coma dream); Corporal (200th)
- Gender: Male
- Occupation: FBI Supervisory Special Agent; FBI Liaison to Jeffersonian Institute; FBI Academy instructor (former); Sergeant Major, US Army (former); Prison inmate (briefly); Club owner (his coma dream); Thief (The 200th in the 10th)
- Affiliation: FBI Headquarters; FBI Washington DC Field office Homicide Division; Major Crimes Unit; Jeffersonian Institute; Nightclub "Lab" (his coma dream); FBI Academy (formerly); 101st Airborne Division (former); 75th Ranger Regiment (former); U.S. Army Special Forces (former); U.S. Army Rangers (former); U.S. Army (former); U.S. Navy (former)
- Family: Grandfather: Hank Booth; Mother: Marianne Booth; Father: Edwin Booth (deceased); Brother: Jared Booth (deceased)
- Spouses: Temperance Brennan (wife; 2013 - present); Rebecca Stinson (partner; before show)
- Significant others: Camille Saroyan; Tessa Jankow; Hannah Burley
- Children: Parker Booth (son, with Rebecca; born c. 2001); Christine Booth (daughter, with Temperance; born 2012); Hank Booth Jr. (son, with Temperance; born 2015)
- Relatives: Father-in-law: Max Keenan/Matthew Brennan (deceased); Mother-in-law: Christine Brennan/Ruth Keenan (deceased); Brother-in-law: Russ Brennan; Sister-in-law: Padme Dalaj; Ancestor: John Wilkes Booth

FBI Special Agent Seeley Booth (seasons 1–12) is the official liaison to the Jeffersonian. A decorated former Army sniper, he frequently consults with Dr. Brennan and her team in his investigations, where his warmth serves as a counter to Dr. Brennan's hard, objective and analytical approach. Booth has, however, shown little hesitation when required to risk his life for his friends, but expresses some reluctance in later seasons; when he's sent overseas in season 10, he states that he's not going to do so again, as he's worried about being killed in combat and leaving his son Parker without a father. At the end of Season 4, it is revealed Booth has a brain tumor causing him to hallucinate. In season 5, Booth admits to Dr. Saroyan that he is in love with Brennan. It is also revealed that he is a direct descendant of presidential assassin John Wilkes Booth, a fact that upsets him greatly. In the season 6 finale it is revealed that Dr. Brennan was expecting Booth's child after they had spent the night together when both were suffering from the death of Vincent Nigel-Murray and slept together. Their daughter Christine was born in Season 7 and the couple marry in Season 9. Later in season 9, after his fighting against a corrupt government group, three corrupt FBI agents are sent to kill him as a warning to the others to stop the investigation. After that fails, he is framed, arrested and imprisoned for murdering the three agents, who were supposedly just there to serve a warrant for his arrest. In the opening episode of Season 10, Dr. Brennan effects his release, but the nightmare continues to escalate, leading to the death of their co-worker Sweets. Following the arrest of the conspirators, Booth remains traumatized and blames himself for Sweets' death. Later in season 10, he rekindled his old gambling habits to cope with his pain, which results in him being kicked out of his home by Brennan. After regaining her trust, he reevaluates his choices and decides that it would be best for his family if he retired from the FBI. He leaves the team along with Brennan, planning to pursue prior job offers. When Season 11 begins it is revealed that Booth now has a son named Hank Booth II, after his grandfather.

=== Angela Montenegro ===
Portrayed by Michaela Conlin

Angela Montenegro
- Bones character
- First appearance: September 13, 2005 (1x01, "Pilot")
- Last appearance: March 28, 2017 (12x12, "The End in the End")
- Created by: Hart Hanson
- Portrayed by: Michaela Conlin

In-universe information
- Aliases: Smacky Kennedy, Pookie Noodlin
- Nicknames: Ange, Angie
- Gender: Female
- Occupation: Forensic Artist
- Family: Billy Gibbons (father)
- Spouses: Grayson Barasa (m. 2003; div. 2008) Jack Hodgins (m. 2010)
- Children: Michael Staccato Vincent Hodgins (son, with Jack; born 2011); Unnamed child (unborn, with Jack)
- Relatives: Christine Angela Booth (goddaughter); Hank Booth II (godson)

Angela Montenegro (seasons 1–12) works as a forensic artist at the Jeffersonian Institute and is Brennan's best friend. She changed her name in her late teens, but only one girl, her double-ex, Roxie knows her real name. Angela is the squint squad's team specialist in craniofacial reconstruction and can generate holograms using her three-dimensional graphics program (The Angelatron) to simulate various scenarios of a crime. She is open, friendly and caring, and constantly tries to draw Dr. Brennan out of the lab. She is one of the few Squints known to get emotionally attached to cases, and Brennan later states that when she started working at the Jeffersonian, Angela had to party and have sex all the time to deal with the horror of her job. In the episode "The Man in the Fallout Shelter", it was revealed Angela's father is Billy Gibbons, a member of the band ZZ Top. Her middle name is supposedly "Pearly Gates", which is also the name of Billy Gibbons' 1959 Les Paul guitar. In season five, she marries Dr. Jack Hodgins while in jail for an outstanding warrant. During the ceremony, she whispers her real name to the justice of the peace, though it is never revealed to the viewers. In season 6, we learn that she is pregnant with her first child, a son, Michael Staccato Vincent Hodgins, who was born during the season finale. Following the death of Sweets and Booth's arrest, Angela begins to get sick of the horror of her and her husband's jobs and begins thinking about quitting her job for good and moving her family to Paris. Although they do buy a house there, she ultimately decides to stay after Brennan and Booth leave the team. In "The Life in the Light" it was revealed that her actual name, as displayed on her passport, is Pooky (or Pookie) Noodlin. She never changed it because her father implored her not to, as the name was very important to him.

=== Jack Hodgins ===
Portrayed by T. J. Thyne

Dr. Jack Hodgins
- Bones character
- First appearance: September 13, 2005 (1x01, "Pilot")
- Last appearance: March 28, 2017 (12x12, "The End in the End")
- Created by: Hart Hanson
- Portrayed by: T. J. Thyne

In-universe information
- Nicknames: Hodgepodge, Hodgie, The Bug and Slime Guy, King of the Lab, King of the Funeral, Thurston, Hodgekins, Curly, Bugboy (by Agent Booth)
- Gender: Male
- Title: Doctor (3 × Ph.D.)
- Occupation: Forensic Entomologist, Botanist & Mineralogist, heir to the Cantilever Group
- Family: Jonathan Hodgins III (Father); Anne Hodgins (Mother); Billy Gibbons (Father-in-law); Preston Alexander Hildenbrand III (maternal grandfather); Chester Putnam Hodgins (great-grandfather); Patrick (uncle); Jeffrey (brother)
- Spouses: Angela Montenegro (Wife; 2010–present)
- Children: Michael Staccato Vincent Hodgins (son, with Angela; born 2011)
- Religion: Episcopalian

Dr. Jack Hodgins (seasons 1–12) is an entomologist, mineralogist and botanist, but conspiracy theories are his hobby. He is one of the more "normal" people in the group and tries to help teach Zack how to be socially competent.

Hodgins' family was extremely wealthy, and he thought he was the last living heir of the Cantilever Group. Hodgins wants to keep his wealth a secret, as he wants to be treated like everyone else. In season 5, he marries Angela Montenegro while in jail for an eight-year-old warrant. His son with Angela, Michael Staccato Vincent Hodgins, was born in the season 6 finale.

In season 8, episode 12 ("The Corpse on the Canopy"), Hodgins loses his entire fortune to Christopher Pelant. Pelant seizes control of a General Atomics MQ-9 Reaper and aims it at a girls' school in the Afghan province of Kandahar while simultaneously draining all of Hodgins' financial accounts. He uses the same computer network to do both, forcing Hodgins to choose between saving the school or preserving his fortune, and Hodgins chooses to save the lives of the girls.

Towards the end of season 8, Hodgins and one of Brennan's interns, Finn Abernathy, find the lost recipe for Finn's grandmother's hot sauce, and together they successfully market the product. Hodgins thus recovers some of his fortune.

In season 9, we learn more about Hodgins' family, as he discovers he is not an only child. Hodgins chooses to find a way to help his new family member (a mentally unstable older brother named Jeff) financially, even though Hodgins has lost his family's fortune.

In the season 10 episode "The Eye in the Sky", Hodgins independently creates a shatterproof material after destroying multiple glass beakers during an experiment. During the following episode, he becomes a millionaire again after selling his material to a major company. To make Angela happy, he buys them a house in Paris, but later she convinces him that she's happy where they are. They decide to stay and keep doing what they love at the Jeffersonian. In the episode "The Next in the Last" Hodgins regains the money Pelant stole, but decides to donate it all to charities.

Season 11 saw a major setback for Hodgins in the episode "The Doom in the Boom" when he is one of several people injured by a booby-trapped corpse's explosion. He seemingly has only minor injuries, but later suddenly loses the use of his legs. From this point on in the series, he uses a wheelchair.

=== Camille Saroyan ===
Portrayed by Tamara Taylor

Dr. Camille Saroyan (seasons 2–12), always called Cam except by Agent Booth (who calls her Camille), is a forensic pathologist and the Head of the Forensic Division at Jeffersonian Institute. She was born and raised in The Bronx and used to be a coroner in New York, although she does not have a noticeable New York accent. In Season 8, while investigating a possible victim of the September 11 attacks, she stated that she signed 900 death certificates that day. During the time frame between the end of Season 1 and beginning of Season 2, she was appointed as Dr. Goodman's replacement. When asked by Booth why she took the job, she said that she wanted a change of scenery (though she initially makes light of the question, claiming that she accepted the position because the tools were more sophisticated). When the team briefly breaks up for a year-long sabbatical between Seasons 5 and 6, she was appointed a federal coroner but returns to the Jeffersonian when the team is reunited.

Dr. Goodman appeared only as an administrator, but Cam is a full member of Booth and Brennan's team, handling bodies with flesh still intact. She was introduced Season 2, Episode 1, after being hired by Dr. Goodman while Dr. Brennan was on vacation. At first, she and the team have an uneasy working relationship because she is a hands-on manager and insists on being kept informed at all times, but in the episode "The Boy in the Shroud" they talk out their differences. Brennan acknowledges Cam's expertise as a pathologist and coroner, and that Cam's interpersonal skills make her an ideal "boss" after she witnesses Cam defend the team's (and Booth's) credibility to an attorney. Cam had a romantic relationship with Booth when she was still in New York, which was briefly rekindled in season 2, until Booth decided that his "high risk" life put anyone close to him in danger. It is not explained how she knew the Booth brothers, as they were from Pennsylvania and she from New York. In season 4, Cam adopted Michelle Welton, the teenage daughter of her former fiancé, whose death was being investigated by the Jeffersonian team. In the Season 8 episode "The Bod in the Pod", it is revealed she is in a romantic relationship with intern Arastoo Vaziri. Cam and Arastoo keep their relationship secret from all but Hodgins and Angela until the episode "The Survivor in the Soap", where Cam tells their colleagues out of professional courtesy, and in "The Pathos in the Pathogen", where she openly admits to being deeply in love with Arastoo when his life is threatened with an altered strain of virus. In season 10, Arastoo begins talking about marriage, which Cam avoids out of fear and refuses to consider. She becomes paranoid with worry when Arastoo has to go back to his home country to visit his dying brother, convinced that something bad will happen to him. She later goes to the Middle East with Booth to solve a murder so he can be freed from imprisonment. During the season 10 finale, she cries profusely and states that everyone is leaving the Jeffersonian, and she does not want things to change.

During an investigation, Cam primarily deals with evidence pertaining to flesh, tissue, and bodily fluids. Using her experience as a coroner, she sometimes provides insight into possible causes of death whenever Dr. Brennan's empirical approach hits a dead end.

=== Lance Sweets ===
Portrayed by John Francis Daley

Dr. Lance Sweets (seasons 3–10) is an FBI psychologist assigned to Booth and Brennan after Booth arrests Brennan's father and, later, her brother. The character made his first appearance in Season 3, Episode 4, "The Secret in the Soil", and became a main cast member in Episode 9, "The Santa in the Slush". When he joins the cast, he is 22 years old, which is remarkable for a Ph.D. achiever; but he looks much younger, which causes Booth to be rude and condescending. While he is annoyed at Booth, Sweets stands his ground, even coaxing Booth and Brennan into going on a double date with him and his tropical fish-specialist girlfriend, April. Sweets and April break up shortly after the date, and Booth and Brennan become something of a "crying shoulder" in a reciprocal relationship. He later falls in love with intern Daisy Wick. Also, Sweets is trained as a profiler and has assisted Booth and Brennan, finding even dull lab-work new and exciting. As part of Season 3's storyline concerning the serial killers collectively known as Gormogon, Sweets helps Booth and Brennan identify possible victims and profile Gormogon. He can talk effectively with Booth and Brennan in the language appropriate to each; but he has an unfortunate tendency to use language similar to valleyspeak when testifying in court, which is inappropriate for someone of his age and accomplishments. He is also a big part in the matchmaking for Brennan and Booth and writes a book about them, which he discards when he learns from them that it was based on a false premise. He makes a guest appearance on the second episode of The Finder to assess Walter Sherman.

In the episode, "The Bones on the Blue Line", Sweets, after a near-death experience, proposes to Daisy, who accepts. However, in the Season 5 finale, "The Beginning in the End", Daisy decides to leave on a year-long anthropological dig with Dr. Brennan, and Sweets says that he would not wait for her.

Upon the reassembly of the team in the Season 6 premiere, his relationship with Daisy is unclear since he adamantly rejects her request to return to their engaged status. However, at the end of the episode, they reconcile, having been unable to keep their hands off of each other.

In the Season 8 episode "The Tiger in the Tale", Sweets and Daisy rent an apartment together, and both, especially Daisy, seem excited at the chance to live together. Later, though, Sweets starts to have doubts about moving in with her, especially after learning from Angela and Booth that, while he may not see moving in with Daisy to be a big deal, she likely does. After Daisy states that she believes living together will eventually lead to marriage, especially if she gets pregnant, Sweets realizes that he and Daisy want different things out of their relationship (since he is not sure that he wants them to get married), and breaks up with her. Sweets gives her the key to the apartment, allowing her to live there herself, while, after spending two weeks living in his office, he moves in with Brennan and Booth because Booth feels badly for him. While Booth is in jail, he gets back together with Daisy and are expecting a baby boy. He wanted Booth to be the godfather because he was like family to him. It is also later revealed that Sweets wanted to name his son Seeley, after Agent Booth.

Sweets is killed near the end of the tenth-season premiere "The Conspiracy in the Corpse".

Sweets' son, Seeley-Lance, is born in the tenth-season episode "The Puzzler in the Pit".

In the episode "The Psychic in the Soup", Angela and Avalon Harmonia find out that Sweets had re-written Booth and Brennan's story as a truthful love story and that he had planned to give it to them as a thank-you gift for being his surrogate family before he died.

=== James Aubrey ===
Portrayed by John Boyd

James Aubrey (seasons 10–12) is a junior FBI agent working under Booth. He is portrayed as a suave and charismatic but competent rookie agent. He describes himself as a "child of the 90s." His inexperience is viewed several times where he is openly revolted and nearly vomits at the sight of corpses. Unlike Booth, he is accepted by the Jeffersonian team of "squints," namely Hodgins and Angela, almost immediately.

When Aubrey was thirteen, his father Philip (portrayed by John Boyd's real-life father Guy Boyd), a Wall Street investment firm owner, was charged with fraud and cheating clients of millions through a Ponzi scheme using his hedge fund and then fled to Croatia, leaving Aubrey and his mother behind without a penny. It is apparent that he was still angry and bitter over his father's abandonment even after all these years, which Booth quickly picks up during their investigation into the murder of a trader. In fact, in the season 10 finale, "The Next in the Last," Aubrey mentions that he helped bring down his own father.

A recurring character trait is his love of food. He is usually seen eating when he and Booth are discussing a case, sometimes to Booth's annoyance, and gets a bit of an attitude if he has to skip a meal.

Aubrey first appears in the season ten premiere as an agent assigned to secretly keep tabs on Booth following his release from prison. Although Booth quickly realizes he is being followed and became angry, Aubrey immediately trusts and looks up to him and the rest of the team. Still hurt over being framed and Sweets' untimely murder, Booth flatly refuses to bring another FBI agent with him on investigations, despite the fact that Sweets immediately approved of Aubrey.

During his first few appearances, Aubrey attempts to gain Booth's approval and trust, something Booth reacts to with annoyance and suspicion. Booth eventually accepts Aubrey as he slowly comes to terms with the loss of Sweets. Booth is sometimes annoyed by Aubrey's sense of humor and over-the-top exuberance over certain things, such as video games and young children, but begins to respect him.

Aubrey is the only character, other than Brennan and Sweets, to have dared to directly speak to Booth about his past gambling addiction. Booth is initially not pleased that Aubrey had read his file but Aubrey clarifies that he had "heard rumors", indicating that Booth's gambling problem was a well-known secret within the F.B.I, and that Sweets had been "pretty thorough" in his report his surveillance of Booth. When Brennan discovers Booth's relapse in the season ten episode "The Murder in the Middle East," Aubrey helps keep her and Christine safe from his bookie, who had previously threatened them when trying to collect a gambling debt from Booth, who was away in Iran at the time.

By the season ten episode "The Verdict in the Victims," Aubrey is shown to be a fully accepted member of the team, eating Sunday dinner with Booth and Brennan and occasionally baby-sitting Christine. After working a case with Jeffersonian intern Jessica Warren, he developed an attraction to her after discovering their common affinities.

When Booth leaves the FBI, Aubrey is assigned to take Booth's place. When Booth says his goodbyes, he surprises Aubrey by telling him that he is proud of him and that he couldn't think of anyone better to replace him.

=== Zack Addy ===
Portrayed by Eric Millegan

Dr. Zack Addy (seasons 1–3; recurring afterward) is introduced as Dr. Brennan's graduate student and assistant at the Jeffersonian Institute at the start of the series. In the second season, he receives his doctorate in forensic anthropology and applied engineering and becomes a professional forensic anthropologist. Zack is closer to the stereotypical geek than anyone else on the team, though he does enjoy some normal pursuits and is known to be a fan of basketball. Although well-meaning, helpful, and friendly, when a situation calls for social interaction or intuition, he is often lost. During the course of events leading up to the death of Howard Epps, Zack was nearly killed after he unwittingly triggered a pressure sensor tied to a bomb affixed to the headless body of Caroline Epps, who was killed by her husband, Howard Epps. (Earlier he was lucky to escape possible lethal infection by quickly putting on a gas mask after Dr. Saroyan cut into a concealed glass bulb while examining Caroline Epps' head). He is extremely intelligent—in episode 11 it is said his IQ is significantly above 163 (which is already a genius level), in the first episode of season 12 it's implied it's 180. He is also Hodgins' best friend, and lives in the upper part of Hodgins' garage. At the end of Season 3, he was revealed to be an accomplice to "Gormogon". He was admitted to a psychiatric institution following his confession to murdering the Lobbyist ("The Knight on the Grid").

While in the psychiatric institute, Zack was regularly visited by Hodgins and Dr. Sweets. After some time, Zack broke out of the psychiatric facility in order to help his friends solve a case. After the case was solved, Zack willingly returned to the psychiatric facility. Zack later told Sweets that he did not kill anyone, but told Gormogon where the victim was in order to murder and cannibalize them. Sweets wanted to tell the others, but Zack told him not to do so to avoid being sent to a "regular jail" as he "would not do well in prison".

In the Season 11 finale, it is revealed that Zack is related to a recurring nightmare that Dr. Brennan has been experiencing about the 'Puppeteer', a killer who sets up his victims' bodies so that they can be manoeuvred on strings, so Booth enters the psychiatric facility late at night, ignoring an employee who commands him to stop, and barges into Zack's room. Even though the worker insists Zack is in bed sleeping, his bed is found empty and the employee calls security. At the end of the episode half of Zack's supposed face is shown in the dark and says to Brennan 'Hello, Dr. Brennan, it's been so long, we have so much to talk about.' It is subsequently revealed that the Puppeteer is a doctor at the sanitorium who has been framing Zack for his crimes, with Zack finally admitting that he isn't a killer when he finds himself unable to kill the doctor even in self-defence. With the aid of Gordon Gordon and Sweets' old notes, the team are able to get Zack's sentence reduced from a lifetime sentence for murder to just over another year in the sanitorium, the remaining amount of time he must serve for helping Gormogon in the first place.

=== Daniel Goodman ===
Portrayed by Jonathan Adams

Dr. Daniel Goodman (season 1) is the director of the Jeffersonian Institute who is an archaeologist and his expertise in religious and other artifacts sometimes came in handy during a case. He is a loving husband and the father to a pair of five-year-old twin girls. His way of working leads Hodgins to think of him as subjective, long-winded, and lacking the qualities of a pure scientist; however, the antagonism between the two develops into a friendly rivalry as the season progresses. Dr. Goodman has not made any appearances beyond Season 1; and, as of Episode 23, "The Titan on the Tracks", he is said to be on sabbatical. In an interview, Hart Hanson said that Camille Saroyan was added to the show because she proved to be a much better fit with the team instead of Goodman, indicating that Goodman may never return to the show. When introduced in the Season 1 episode "Pilot", he tells Dr Brennan that she has a "disturbingly steep learning curve".

== Recurring characters ==
=== Interns ===
Since the departure of Dr. Zack Addy from the Jeffersonian, Dr. Brennan has not had a permanent replacement for him, but has instead taken on a number of interns. While the introduction of various new interns may have initially been intended to find one suitable replacement for Dr. Addy, over time the role has become rotating, with two or more interns sometimes joining efforts to solve particular cases. There are six main interns after Zack — Clark Edison, Vincent Nigel-Murray, Wendell Bray, Colin Fisher, Daisy Wick, and Arastoo Vaziri — with additional interns who appear in subsequent episodes.

Actor	Character	Seasons
Eugene Byrd	Clark Edison	3–12
Ryan Cartwright	Vincent Nigel-Murray	4–6
Michael Grant Terry	Wendell Bray	4–12
Joel David Moore	Colin Fisher	4–9, 11–12
Pej Vahdat	Arastoo Vaziri	4–12
Carla Gallo	Daisy Wick	4–12
Scott Lowell	Douglas Filmore	6-7, 9
Luke Kleintank	Finn Abernathy	7–9
Brian Klugman	Oliver Wells	8–11
Ignacio Serricchio	Rodolfo Fuentes	9–12
Laura Spencer	Jessica Warren	9–12

==== Clark Edison ====
Portrayed by Eugene Byrd

Dr. Clark Thomas Edison (season 3–12) is a recurring character who first appeared in the Season 3 premiere where he was interviewing to become Dr. Brennan's assistant while Zack was stationed in Iraq. However, Zack returned in that very episode. Clark returned twice more before Zack's arrest; in Season 3, Episode 13, "The Verdict in the Story", Brennan hires him to work with the defense of Brennan's father, who was on trial for murder, Clark proved one of Zack's conclusions about the murder weapon wrong.

In Season 4, Episode 1, "Yanks in the UK", he made an appearance as the first of the group of six revolving assistants assigned to replace Zack. At the end of the episode, however, he reveals he cannot tolerate the informal attitudes of Dr. Brennan's team and quits. He does retain a recurring role throughout the series, still harboring some ill-feelings towards the informal behavior of his co-workers even as he recognizes the Jeffersonian's exceptional reputation. In "The Girl in the Mask", Brennan compares Clark with Wendell and Vincent, saying Clark is the "most astute and experienced," and indeed Clark is the only intern to earn his doctorate during his internship. Clark Edison is a vegan, and as such has very strong opinions about animal rights. While Angela was trying to remain celibate after breaking up with Roxie, she flirted very heavily with Clark, prompting him to introduce her to his girlfriend, Nora Oldhouse, a professor of women's studies and a fellow vegan (who describes Clark as "dynamite" in bed), to fend her off.

In the Season 4 alternate reality finale, Clark was re-imagined as a rap musician, "C-Synch", hoping to play at Booth and Brennan's night club, The Lab. Booth refused to book him because his brother, a re-imagined Grayson Barasa, was a gang leader.

In season 5, the first hint of Clark's sentimental side shows when he expresses approval of Agent Booth's willingness to let his grandfather, Hank Booth, stay with him after his triple bypass surgery. Clark also mentions his own late grandfather, and reveals that his pursuing a career in forensic anthropology is in his grandfather's memory.

In the Season 6 premiere, which is seven months after the Season 5 finale, it is revealed he left the Jeffersonian for a position in Chicago. He rejoined Dr. Brennan's team in the Season 6, Episode 2, "The Couple in the Cave", after learning of her return. During Season 6, at the encouragement of his girlfriend, Clark has changed, from being unwilling to reveal personal information, to sharing many details of his life, but with little tact, much to the team's chagrin. In "The Couple in the Cave", he discovers that he is highly allergic to Lonicera sempervirens (Trumpet Honeysuckle), a species of honeysuckle. Clark continues to open up in "The Body in the Bag", he reveals that he comes from a large family (nine brothers and sisters, and that he could never get a word in with them) and that his parents traveled away from home a lot (he speculates that he has abandonment issues because of this), all of which he attributes to his being so withdrawn and private. Clark has also expressed the desire to become a father and to start a large family.

In season 7, Clark appears in two episodes, "The Male in the Mail", where he gets awkward around Brennan and her pregnancy, and "The Warrior in the Wuss", where, concerning the impending first meeting between Parker and baby Christine, he brings up the fact that there are many myths about the dangers of step-children.

In the season 8 premiere, with Brennan on the run, Clark has been appointed to her position of Chief Forensic Anthropologist at the Jeffersonian. He is running a tighter ship than Brennan did, which Angela and Hodgins are resisting. Cam supports him and reminds the pair that all of them, including Clark, are working to clear Brennan's name so that she can return home. Once Brennan is cleared of the charges, he is relieved to return the position to her and instead takes on the new position Cam has created for serious historical forensic anthropology. He reappears in "The Archaeologist in the Cocoon", where he assumes custody of prehistoric human remains, and he and Brennan clash over who should be working with them. In "The Shot in the Dark", after Brennan is shot in the Bone Room, Clark steps in to continue where she left off while she's in the hospital. During this episode, in a conversation with Hodgins and Sweets, Clark reveals that his middle name is "Thomas", and they joke that essentially his name is "Thomas Edison".

During season 10, he admits that Arastoo is his best friend, as he was instructed by him to take care of Cam while he returned to the Middle East.

==== Wendell Bray ====
Portrayed by Michael Grant Terry

Wendell Bray (seasons 4–12) is one of Dr. Brennan's interns whom she described as her "brightest scholarship student". He first appears in "The Perfect Pieces in the Purple Pond", in which he mistakes Dr. Brennan's question about whether he has a preference for dating older women as a come-on. He tells Angela he is not sure what to do, as he needs the job as intern because he "owes people money". Angela assumes this means he owes money to the mob; but, when she discovers him with a cigarette (which he uses as a method of concentrating after witnessing his father smoking while thinking, although he does not smoke as his father died of lung cancer), it is revealed he needs the money to pay back his old working-class neighbors, who contributed money for him to go to college. In that episode, he revealed that he boxed Golden Gloves in his teens. His second appearance is in "The Bone That Blew".

Wendell is portrayed as one of the more "normal" interns; he lacks the social ineptitude characteristic of the likes of Daisy Wick, Oliver Wells and Zack Addy and is often heard cracking jokes with Jack Hodgins. Initially he is often shocked and turned off by Dr. Brennan's straight comments; in his debut episode he mistakes Dr. Brennan's question about whether he has a preference for dating older women as a come-on. He is one of the few interns Booth is able to relate to—Booth once described him as "sort of normal"—and they bond over their mutual love of sports and play on the same amateur ice hockey team. The two are close friends.

In the season 4 finale alternate reality, Wendell was re-imagined as the bouncer at Booth and Brennan's night club.

In "The Girl in the Mask", Brennan compares Wendell to Clark and Vincent as the intern with "the most potential and an excellent work ethic".

In the Season 5 episode "The Bond in the Boot", everyone in Brennan's team but Wendell learns that Wendell can no longer work as an intern as his scholarship had run out of money due to the recession. This fact is kept from him as Cam tries to figure out another scholarship for him until Brennan breaks the news to him assuming he was aware of it. Wendell manages to work impressively on the case; and, by the time he was bidding everyone farewell, Camille tells him an anonymous donation has been made to support his scholarship. A visibly affected Wendell thanks everyone, suspecting them of the good deed and leaves when he found it difficult to maintain composure. Camille discreetly tells Brennan, Hodgins and Angela that the scholarship party actually received enough donations to fund the scholarship for "three" people. As everyone exchanges knowing smiles and leaves, Brennan glances at Angela's appreciative smile, hinting that she knows more than is apparent; it's implied that Camille and Hodgins made the additional donations.

In the same season episode "The Tough Man in the Tender Chicken", Wendell and a sex-deprived Angela, who has been celibate for almost six months, on the advice of Dr. Sweets, end up sleeping together. However, Angela breaks it off with him later in "The Death of the Queen Bee", after Wendell learns that Angela mistakenly thought she might have been pregnant with his child. Angela realized that, had she been pregnant, Wendell would have "done his duty" while Hodgins' offer was to stay with her because of love. The breakup between the two was mutual and amicable, and they remained friends after the ordeal. In Season 8, it is indirectly revealed that he had posed nude for Angela, much to Hodgins' disillusionment.

In the Season 6 episode "The Mastodon in the Room", the fellowship program of the interns was closed down on Dr. Brennan's departure from the Jeffersonian Institute to study historical remains in the Maluku Islands. Wendell got a job working at a mechanic shop to save money for tuition. When Brennan came back and tried looking for an assistant, she learns all had branched out and left. She came down to the mechanic shop to rehire Wendell who agreed to come back if the job was not a one-off. At Brennan's querying how much would he need for his tuition since all her money "was not much use in Maluku", he smiles back and later is found to be working in the episode's case, indicating Brennan might have agreed to his terms. He has appeared the most times of Dr. Brennan's interns.

During Season 6, Wendell grows closer to Hodgins and Angela, who are expecting their first child, solidifying that there is no residual regret or angst left from Angela and Wendell's brief relationship. Wendell shows several times that he is happy for the two, and it is insinuated the three have become very close friends over the duration of Season 6.

In Season 7, in "The Crack in the Code", at the end of the episode, Booth mentions that he is going to recruit Wendell in the restoration of Booth and Brennan's new house, as Wendell needs the money.

In season 8, the episode "The Patriot in Purgatory", Wendell reveals that his uncle was a fireman in New York City that perished during the events of September 11, 2001. Wendell spent 9/11 and the next few days with his aunt, and it's a very sensitive topic with him.

In Season 9, Wendell attends Booth and Brennan's wedding in the episode "Woman in the White". In the episode "Big in the Philippines", he breaks his arm in a hockey accident. Brennan later determines that he has Ewing's sarcoma, a rare bone cancer. Initially, Wendell wants to give up his work and explore the world using what time he has left, rather than suffer through chemotherapy. Booth and Brennan, however, convince him to undergo treatment. In the episode "The High in the Low", Wendell reveals to Hodgins that he has been using medicinal marijuana to help with the side effects. While Hodgins and Bones accept this because of his cancer, when he reveals this information to Cam, she is forced to fire him on the basis that the Jeffersonian is a federal institution and, despite the fact it will not affect his work ethic and it is helping his condition, marijuana use is illegal in federal facilities. This decision upsets the team, including Cam, who was very remorseful for firing him. However, at the end of the episode, Booth persuades Caroline to make Wendell an independent case consultant, so he can still work with the Jeffersonian, albeit without being in contact with any evidence in the case. He later goes into remission and is rehired as an intern. He falls in love with a young nurse from the hospital and ends up dating her after his remission, despite his fear that he would relapse and break her heart if he died.

At the end of season 11, while dealing with a serial killer known as "The Puppeteer", Brennan has nightmares regarding Wendell, particularly Wendell with burned hands. After Brennan is kidnapped, the team figures out that Wendell was standing in in Brennan's nightmares for who she thought the killer must be: someone who worked at the lab who had severe burns to his hands. This, combined with the other evidence, leads the team to conclude that the killer is Zack Addy, who proves to be the one who abducted Brennan. However, at the beginning of season 12, Zack ultimately proves to have been framed by the real killer, his doctor.

In late Season 12, Wendell struggles to write his thesis and Brennan helps him realize that his true passion is not forensic anthropology after all. By the end of the series, Wendell plans to leave the Jeffersonian to discover his true passion while still maintaining contact with his friends. He has not left by "The End in the End" when Wendell joins the other interns in trying to decipher a clue in a skeleton when Brennan's head injury prevents her from helping or even remembering what it was she had noticed that was so important. It is ultimately Wendell who comes up with a realization of what Brennan saw that allows the team to discover the hideout of a dangerous serial killer that has been targeting Booth and Brennan.

==== Colin Fisher ====
Portrayed by Joel David Moore

Dr. Colin Fisher (seasons 4–9, 11–12) is a perpetually pessimistic intern, who manages to even depress Cam. Fisher debuts in the episode "The Crank in the Shaft". In regards to his pessimism, he was once asked by Cam if he had ever tried Prozac, to which he answered 'yes' but that it had had not much effect on him. In spite of his pessimism, he seems to find Dr. Brennan's blunt, radical honesty and factual-ness to be more "awesome" than anyone else's attempts at kindness.

In "The Princess and the Pear", he admitted to being a "geek" and went undercover for a case at Imagicon, a fantasy convention. His future at the Jeffersonian however, was placed in doubt after he admitted to sleeping with one of the suspects. In "The Critic in the Cabernet", he offers to let Brennan use his "discount sperm" for the baby she decides to have. He is turned down, however, in favor of Booth.

In the fourth-season finale, Fisher was re-imagined as the chef at Booth and Brennan's night club, "The Lab".

Fisher appears again in "The Gamer in the Grease" in season 5, where he has won three free tickets to the premiere of the science fiction film Avatar (in which Joel David Moore, the actor who plays Fisher, has a supporting role). Fisher invites Hodgins and Sweets to attend the premiere, but they must take turns standing in line in order to maintain their position. Fisher ends up missing the movie, as he meets a woman in line and has sex with her in a tent on the sidewalk outside the theater.

In Episode 1 of Season 6, Caroline reveals that Fisher checked himself into a clinic with a case of the "hopeless vapors". He was re-instated in Episode 3 of Season 6; after correcting Hodgins that he was never suicidal, Fisher discloses that as he was sleeping 20 hours a day for a period of two months, his shrink had said that it was a serious warning sign. His then-shrink also thinks that Fisher should get out of the forensic anthropology business; but as Fisher mentions to Cam, he tried to explain to his shrink that "it is not violent death that makes [Fisher] morbidly depressed, it was life itself", and that he is actually quite positive about his job. Later, in Episode 13 of Season 6, "The Daredevil in the Mold", he works to cure himself of his depression, listening to calming music or the sounds of the sea, and drinking foul-smelling teas. Fisher also reveals that he can read lips. Although he does not appear in Episode 20, "The Pinocchio in the Planter", Fisher is mentioned by fellow intern, Wendell, as "[didn't] need the money", when he put forward his argument Dr. Saroyan as to why he needed the extra hours in the lab.

Fisher returns in "The Twist in the Twister", in season 7, and reveals that he has recently had a stay at another mental health facility, "Verdant Valley" (which he says, as "nuthouses" or "loony-bins" go, he gives a personal rating of "4 out of 5 nuts; fantastic game room, but the nightgowns chafed"), and that, as a condition of his release, he is living with his mother, who, although has yet to make a physical appearance, is put across as chipper, the opposite of her son, and who causes him bother by constantly phoning him at the Jeffersonian.

In the season 8 episode "The Patriot in Purgatory", Fisher revealed that he was in high school when 9/11 occurred; he was attempting to break into a teacher's desk to steal a test that he had not studied for, but when the teacher came in and revealed what had happened, the two simply sat and grieved together while holding the test.

In season 9, in "The Woman in White", Fisher admits he gets along with fellow intern Oliver Wells.

Fisher is absent from season 10, but ultimately returns in the season 11 episode "The Secret in the Service" to help solve the murder of a secret service agent (as Dr. Brennan is suffering from a cold), at the request of the President. It unknown for most of the episode why the President requested but by the end Angela reveals to Hodgins and Cam that Fisher is the tutor of the President's teenaged daughter.

He later returns in the season 12 episode "The Tutor in the Tussle."

==== Arastoo Vaziri ====
Portrayed by Pej Vahdat

Dr. Arastoo Vaziri (seasons 4–12) first appears in the episode "The Salt in the Wounds". He is of Iranian heritage and is a devout Muslim who prays five times a day. Expecting others would find it odd that he is both a scientist and very religious, which his co-workers later confirmed, Vaziri decides to put on an accent to sound "fresh off the boat" and thus make his religious devotion seem like an irrelevant byproduct of his heritage. He eventually explains that he is in effect a political exile from his homeland. In later seasons it is revealed that he is a published poet, skilled in martial arts (especially with a nunchaku) and still speaks his native Persian fluently despite being away from Iran for many years.

In the Season 4 alternate-reality finale, he was one of several lab techs re-imagined as a potential buyer of Booth and Brennan's night club.

In Season 5 episode 4, "The Beautiful Day in the Neighborhood", he accidentally rants at Cam in his natural accent during an investigation and his secret is revealed to the team (and the audience). Cam promptly sends him to Dr. Sweets, who helps Vaziri work through the issues. His fears subside as the team accepts him as a fellow scientist after he gives them an honest explanation on how he reconciles his faith with science. It is assumed that Vaziri is an American citizen as implied by his knowledge and love for baseball and the fact that he served in the US military as a translator.

In the Season 5 episode 14, "Devil in the Details", Vaziri revealed that he had served as a military translator in Iraq, where he killed an insurgent while defending his life after surviving an IED. His fellow squad members did not survive. He still harbors guilt over having killed the attacker, despite having acted in self-defense.

In the Season 6 premiere, it is revealed he switched majors from forensic science to cultural anthropology and is interning at the Baghdad Museum. Later, he returns in episode 5, "The Bones That Weren't", as Dr. Brennan's assistant and again in episode 21, "The Signs in the Silence", in which he helps to identify a mysterious deaf-mute girl found covered in blood. Although he doesn't appear in Episode 20, "The Pinocchio in the Planter", he is mentioned by fellow intern, Wendell, according to whom; "Arastoo's family's loaded", when he put forward his argument Dr. Saroyan as to why he needed the extra hours in the lab.

During Season 8 episode 6, "The Patriot in Purgatory", while the interns were focusing on identifying as many remains as quickly as possible, Arastoo kept focusing on the same remains because he believed them to be the remains of a victim that had been present at 9/11 when a plane crashed into the Pentagon. When fellow intern Finn Abernathy asked if Arastoo found it difficult to discuss 9/11 due to his religious ties to terrorists, Arastoo, despite being clearly offended at the statement, informed Finn that he did not consider the attacks as having anything to do with his religion but just to represent hate and hypocrisy. He also revealed that he was praying when he heard about the attacks, noting that he felt as though there was nothing to believe on that day.

In Season 8 episode 7 it is revealed that, at age 18, (putting his age in the episode at 33), Arastoo went to university in Tehran (circa 1997) and was expelled for writing poetry about love, freedom, and democracy, which would have been deemed inappropriate in post-Revolution Iran. He fled Iran and ended up in the United States as he feared for his life. It was also revealed in that episode that he is in a secret romantic relationship with Cam.

While in episode 20 in season 6 it was revealed that his family is well off, according to season 8 episode 7, "The Bod in the Pod", Arastoo is living on a limited budget. It is also revealed in season 8 episode 18, "The Survivor in the Soap" that Arastoo's cousin was a child soldier and he harbors additional guilt over not being able to prevent his death.

In Season 8 episode 7, "The Bod in the Pod", it is also revealed that lab director Cam is in a romantic relationship with Arastoo. They keep their relationship secret from all but Hodgins and Angela until "The Survivor in the Soap", and in "The Pathos in the Pathogens" (season 8 episode 23) she openly admits to being in love with him when his life is threatened with an altered strain of virus.

In season nine, Arastoo introduces Cam to his parents and begins talking about getting married. In season 10, he returns to Iran when his older brother is dying of cancer, not caring about how much he is putting himself in danger. He is arrested, but freed after the team solves a high-profile murder. After his brother is in remission and begins recovering, he returns home with Cam and Booth. He appears in the season ten finale when he shows up to comfort Cam about Booth and Brennan's departure.

In season 11, it is revealed that while Brennan was gone, he completed his doctorate and is now addressed as "Dr. Vaziri." After a brief break-up, he and Cam reconcile and become engaged. They get married in the series finale where it is revealed that they will be adopting three brothers.

==== Daisy Wick ====
Portrayed by Carla Gallo

Daisy Wick (seasons 4–12) is an intern who regards Brennan as her mentor, idol and role-model, unknown to Dr. Brennan. She has the propensity to be irritating and annoyed the entire team, including Booth and even the usually calm Dr. Brennan, with her poor impulse control, lack of consideration for the personal space of others, non-stop talking, and inadvertent insensitivity; eventually leading them to fire her twice. In her second appearance, it is implied that Daisy comes from a large family, which further suggests that her impulsiveness and talkativeness is perhaps a way of getting attention. Throughout the show, the team are seen resorting to various ways of making her "shut up"; Cam once asked Angela to take Daisy on a "joy ride" just to get her out of the lab.

Daisy is later shown to be dating Lance Sweets, who fires her on behalf of Cam so that they will no longer have to be discreet about their relationship. He later persuades Dr. Brennan to re-hire Daisy (whom he has taught self-control techniques) on a 24-hour probationary period. Daisy and Dr. Brennan bond over the identification of the mummy of Anok, an Egyptian prince; and, when she is talking slowly enough to be understood, she proves herself to be a very knowledgeable and astute assistant.

In the episode, "The Bones on the Blue Line", Daisy mentions that she can speed read, (as she has been doing so to read Dr. Brennan's new book, Bone of Contention). Later, after a near-death experience, Sweets proposes to Daisy, who accepts. However, in the Season 5 finale, "The Beginning in the End", Daisy decides to leave on a year-long anthropological dig with Dr. Brennan and Sweets says that he would not wait for her.

Upon the reassembly of the team in the Season 6 premiere, her relationship with Sweets is unclear since he adamantly rejects her request to return to their engaged status. At the end of the episode, Sweets and Daisy reconcile, having been unable to keep their hands off each other. Although she doesn't appear in Episode 20, "The Pinocchio in the Planter", Daisy is mentioned by fellow intern, Wendell, as "[didn't] need the money", when he put forward his argument Dr. Saroyan as to why he needed the extra hours in the lab.

In season 7, in "The Prince in the Plastic", Daisy reveals that, as a child, she had the entire collection of the "Prince Charmington" dolls and accessories franchise, (and still has them all, and is still is a fanatic) while assisting Booth in investigating a crime scene at the factory when none of Booth's usual field partners were available. In "The Prisoner in the Pipe", she reveals that she is also becoming a certified doula.

In the Season 8 episode "The Tiger in the Tale", Sweets and Daisy rent an apartment together, and both, especially Daisy, seem excited at the chance to live together. Later, though, Sweets starts to have doubts about moving in with her, especially after seeking advice from Angela and Booth, as he realizes that cohabitation has different connotations for both of them and could cause a potential conflict—Daisy saw it as a step towards a serious romantic relationship while Sweets viewed it as merely friends sharing an apartment together. After Daisy states that she believes living together will eventually lead to marriage, especially if she gets pregnant, Sweets realizes that he and Daisy want different things out of their relationship (since he is not sure that he wants them to get married), and breaks up with her. Sweets gives her the key to the apartment, allowing her to live there herself.

In season 9 episode "The Source of the Sludge", Daisy fails her post-graduate orals. Feeling under the weather she seeks Sweets advice; though he misinterpreted her feelings for something more. He then believes she missed him, though she was flattered at the sentiment, that wasn't the case. She playfully admits she did sometimes miss him and the sex they enjoyed; especially the sex.

In the season 10 premiere, she is revealed to have reunited with Sweets again and it has resulted in a pregnancy. She was staying with Sweets as they began plans for their future together. Daisy also tells Booth they were expecting a boy; whom she affectionately nicknamed "Little Lance". She then asks Booth to be godfather on behalf of Sweets. Their plans are cut short, when Sweets is killed by an unknown assailant. Though she's distraught, she insists that on helping with the autopsy for him. The next episode, though Daisy is still in grief, she is given comfort by Dr. Brennan and the others; stating that they were the closest to hers and Sweets' family. During the investigation, Daisy is surprised to see the name "Seeley" written in his notes before he was killed; when the others asked the significance of Booth's name, she reveals it was the name they had agreed on for their son, they were going to name him after Booth. The episode ended with a funeral consisting of Angela, Cam, Hodgins, Clark, Caroline Julian, Booth, and Dr. Brennan were the attendees. Daisy held his urn and spread his ashes over the park that held a big significance to both of them. In episode 8, "The Puzzler in the Pit", Daisy goes into labor and delivers her and Sweets' son, who she names Seeley Lance Wick-Sweets. When she is asked out a few months after Sweets' death, she becomes guilty and conflicted, but is helped by Brennan to realize that she does not need to replace Sweets. When Brennan leaves the Jeffersonian in the season ten finale, she tells Daisy that she is very proud of her and that she feels better about leaving knowing that Daisy is working there.

In season 12, it is revealed that Daisy has gotten a job offer as the National Forensic Lab's lead anthropologist. Although hesitant, she accepts their offer and later learns that it was Brennan who recommended her for the job.

In the season four alternate reality finale, Daisy is re-imagined as a coat-check girl at Booth and Brennan's night club.

==== Finn Abernathy ====
Portrayed by Luke Kleintank

Finn Abernathy (seasons 7–9) is an intern at the Jeffersonian Institute first introduced in the episode "The Hot Dog in the Competition". He is a sweet southern boy who is trying to live without the shadow of his past haunting him. Finn had a criminal record with charges including attacking his stepfather with a knife when he abused his mother, but was later expunged. Finn decided to quit, but he came back and received a warning from Brennan. After he returns to his work, Brennan asks him if his interest in forensic anthropology was related to a plan to kill his stepfather, to which he answered yes. She also asked him if he actually killed his stepfather, to which he answered no because after reading a paper she had published, he knew there was no possible way to cover up the murder if he had actually committed it. He is the youngest of the interns to join the lab at the age of 18. In "The Bump in the Road", he and Cam's daughter Michelle go on a date, much to Cam's dismay.

It is revealed in the season 8 episode "The Patriot in Purgatory" that, on September 11 and at the age of 9, Finn got between his mother and stepfather. He was stabbed with a pair of scissors, but didn't go to the hospital due to the comparison he felt between the attack on the Twin Towers and his mere injury.

Finn gets along especially well with Hodgins, with the latter frequently treating him like a surrogate brother. They often joke with each other in the lab and Hodgins calls him "Opie", a reference to Opie Taylor from The Andy Griffith Show, while Finn calls him "Thurston", a reference to Thurston Howell, III from Gilligan's Island. In a number of episodes, Finn's favorite food has been identified as Catfish, which his late grandmother would serve him with her own hot sauce recipe, (mentioned in the season 8 episode, "The Maiden in the Mushrooms", where Hodgins, having helped himself to the last of Finn's last bottle of his late grandmother's hot sauce, uses the lab's mass spectrometer to figure out all of the ingredients). Later in the same episode ("The Maiden in the Mushrooms"), with the hot sauce's recipe figured out, Finn and Hodgins patent the hot sauce as "Opie and Thurston's Hot Sauce". By the time of the events of the season 9 episode, "The Turn in the Urn", the hot sauce is commented upon being very successful. In the earlier season 9 episode, "The Mystery in the Meat", fellow intern, Oliver Wells, admits he loves the hot sauce, having it "every morning on his eggs for breakfast".

==== Oliver Wells ====
Portrayed by Brian Klugman

Dr. Oliver Wells (seasons 8–11) is an intern and polymath with multiple degrees and a 160 IQ. He is portrayed as having a wide range of interests, ranging from physics to psychology, and considers himself to be very open-minded, even on subjects like time travel, or if there is life after death, or asteroid mining. Dr. Hodgins immediately gets along with Oliver, calling him his "Brother from another Mother". When he is stuck on a problem, Oliver likes to eat sticks of string cheese, even if eating inside the lab is against the rules. However, in the season 9, while he is brilliant, he is also shown to lack tact, and he is believed to have a bit of a superiority complex, much to everyone's dismay, has a rather abrasive personality, and is also one of the few interns who regularly (and often obliviously) gets on the nerves of Dr. Brennan and their boss Dr. Camille Saroyan. In the episode "The Mystery in the Meat", he and Daisy are shown to dislike each other but eventually call a truce by the end of the episode.

In season 9, in "The Lady on the List", after failing to make any common ground with his co-workers socially during the case, (Brennan and Hodgins are the only ones who he can have a conversation on equal grounds), Oliver gets to know "VAL", (a new computerized profiling system), describing their conversations as "the most stimulating conversation [he's] ever had". In "The Woman in White", Oliver is invited to Brennan and Booth's wedding. In "The Mystery in the Meat", (season 9, episode 10), Wells reveals to Hodgins that, since Hodgins and Finn released "Opie and Thurston's" Hot sauce, he has been having it every morning on his eggs for breakfast.

In season 10, in "The Money Maker on the Merry-Go-Round", Oliver is shown growing out his beard, and he declares that it is his ambition now to surpass Brennan as the world's leading authority on forensic anthropology; by season 11, his abrasive manner appears to have softened a little, though he still irritates Cam and Brennan on occasion.

==== Vincent Nigel-Murray ====
Portrayed by Ryan Cartwright

Vincent Nigel-Murray (seasons 4–6) is always styled as "Mr." Nigel-Murray by Dr. Brennan and Dr. Saroyan, (a subtle reminder he had not yet earned his doctorate). Vincent is an intern with a "retentive memory", and has a habit of reciting trivia only tangentially relevant to the situation at hand. An Englishman and a graduate of the University of Leeds, he is one of the several rotating interns who take on the duties of Dr. Zack Addy after Season 3. Vincent's first appearance is in "The He in the She". After Cam takes him into the field, Dr. Brennan insists his place is in the lab and sends him back. At the end of the episode, he and Dr. Saroyan agree he would resign as Dr. Brennan's intern because he did not fit in with the rest of the team; but he returns in "Double Trouble in the Panhandle". The episode "The Bones that Foam" reveals that his thoughts sometimes freeze when he is nervous so he would bring himself back to focus by reciting random facts: "Facts are the stitches that hold the fabric of existence together". He also drinks what the team refers to as "odd smelling tea". In "The Girl in the Mask", as Dr. Brennan reviews her personnel files, she comments "Vincent is the most intelligent", prompting Booth to say she should pick him because that is what she likes.

In the alternate reality Season 4 finale, Vincent is re-imagined as the DJ at Booth and Brennan's night club.

In the Season 6 premiere, it is revealed he leaves the Jeffersonian Institute after winning $1 million on Jeopardy! and embarking on a round-the-world trip. He returns in "The Babe in the Bar", having finished his trip around the world. It is also revealed that he is a recovering alcoholic.

In the episode "The Hole in the Heart", he is killed by renegade sniper Jacob Broadsky, who shoots him in the heart. His last words, spoken to Booth and Brennan, are "Don't make me leave". Brennan initially interprets Vincent's last words as a plea to not be fired from his job at the Jeffersonian, although Booth later tells her that Vincent was declaring that he did not want to die. Vincent's death acts as a catalyst for Brennan and Booth to sleep together. Vincent is later honored by Angela and Hodgins, who name their son Michael Staccato Vincent Hodgins, and call him Michael Vincent. It is also revealed in this episode that he was Brennan's favorite intern.

In later seasons, a memorial plaque with Vincent's photo on it can be seen on one of the walls in the main lab. The plaque reads: "IN MEMORY OF VINCENT NIGEL-MURRAY. FRIEND, COLLEAGUE, SCIENTIST, FONT OF FASCINATING FACTS".

==== Douglas Filmore ====
Portrayed by Scott Lowell

Making his first appearance in season 6, "The Feet on the Beach", Dr. Filmore is a Canadian citizen, and a "Forensic Podiatrist". Following the discovery of numerous disembodied feet near the US-Canadian border along the St. Lawrence River, Filmore was invited to assist with the investigation albeit for Brennan to examine the feet found on the Canadian side of the border. Having sought to get forensic podiatry recognised as a field in its own right, an article written by Brennan repudiating his field (claiming that he was only "one quarter of a forensic anthropologist" due to specialising in one quarter of all bones in the human body) resulted in psychosomatic paralysis in his right arm. After proving key insights during the investigation, Brennan apologised to Filmore, at which point he regained the use of his arm.

His next appearance, in season 7, "The Suit on the Set", as a forensic consultant for a film adaptation for one of Dr. Brennan's books, Bone of Contention. Filmore's latest appearance was in season 9, "The Master in the Slop", where he is participating in an American-Canadian trans-border study of co-operation amongst forensic scientists, on behalf of the FBI and the Royal Canadian Mounted Police; here he also shares that he grew up on a farm up in Manitoba, and that he has just completed his PhD in forensic anthropology and can now work with Dr. Brennan "as a peer".

==== Rodolfo Fuentes ====
Portrayed by Ignacio Serricchio

Dr. Rodolfo Fuentes (seasons 9–12) is a Cuban forensic anthropologist seeking asylum in the U.S. Although he was already a qualified forensic anthropologist back in Cuba, his credentials are not recognised in America, so he is working towards the same qualifications in America. He is also a shameless flirt, and has openly flirted with Angela and with Dr. Brennan, both of whom are married. Though Angela was flattered by his actions, both women turned down his advances. Despite his flirting habits, Hodgins takes him under his wing and becomes a good friend to him. He carries his father's prayer beads with him, despite not believing in God, because he believes that you need to experience a little bit of everything to make good life decisions.

In season 12, revealed by Dr. Saroyan handing him a blue lab coat, Rodolfo has succeeded in finishing his doctorate in America and is now to be addressed as "Dr. Fuentes".

==== Jessica Warren ====
Portrayed by Laura Spencer

Jessica Warren (seasons 9–12) appears for the first time at the end of season 9. She is the second female intern and after flirting with Lance Sweets while solving the case, the two have a one-night stand. She often gets into conflict with Cam and Bones because she uses experimental scientific techniques, tends to not ask for permission to run her experiments, and angers Cam with how flirtatious she is at work. She is very outgoing, energetic and adventurous. She is also very close with Hodgins, who she views as her mentor, and often runs experiments with him and jokingly calls him Curly. She states that her hobby is collecting samples of all the periodic elements. In season ten, it is revealed that she was raised in a co-op for gifted children. She is later comforted by Angela and Hodgins who allow her to spend a few nights at their house, following the co-op being shut down, leaving her alone and scared. She manages to win Brennan over by helping her with her social media campaign for her books. Brennan eventually warms up to her and bonds with her by bringing her pictures and samples for her element collection. After working a case alongside Agent Aubrey, she develops an honest interest in him after discovering how much they have in common and takes him out to eat as they both love food and drinking.

=== FBI employees ===
==== Caroline Julian ====
Portrayed by Patricia Belcher

Caroline Julian (seasons 1–12) is a prosecutor and works in the U.S. Attorney's office. Her first appearance was in the first-season episode, "The Man in the Morgue", which was followed by three more appearances in the second season in "Judas on a Pole", "The Man in the Mansion", and "Stargazer in a Puddle". She has a very demanding and bossy attitude, and often uses heavy sarcasm (even when speaking to people above her), which overpowers even Brennan to a point where Brennan does not even argue with her. She has a deep understanding of the workings of the government and the way cases should be handled, and seems to have a friendship history with Booth and trusts his instincts and beliefs when working on cases, although she often seems wary of his and Brennan's less orthodox methods. At the start of the Season 3 finale "The Pain in the Heart" while attending Booth's funeral (which turns out to be fake in order to catch another killer), she said in a eulogy that "I knew Seeley Booth. He was a good man who earned my respect and affection, and I don't like many people". She has appeared numerous times to have Booth and Brennan in court and to solve their cases. She blackmailed Brennan into kissing Booth on the lips under some mistletoe so Brennan could have use of a trailer where her imprisoned father could have a Christmas with their family, though the result was not what any of them anticipated. She has a slight Southern accent and calls people "cher"/"chère", suggesting a New Orleanian background. She is characterized as having eccentric personal style. Dr. Saroyan informed the smitten documentarian Andrew Jursic in Season 8 episode "The Blood from the Stones" that Caroline was divorced and unattached. In Season 2's "The Man in the Mansion", her ex-husband is identified as fellow attorney David Barron. The two are shown to maintain an amicable relationship and Booth tells the team that they have a daughter together.

In the fourth-season finale, Caroline was re-imagined as Booth and Brennan's night club's attorney.

In the Season 5 opener "Harbingers in the Fountain", Caroline is somewhat displeased by the team being led to a mass grave by psychic Avalon Harmonia. After the team identifies the killer but lacks enough evidence for a murder conviction, Caroline helps out by coming up with a list of other federal charges to arrest the man on, charges that she tells them will add up to about a hundred years in prison in addition to the list she is having the District Attorney come up with. Caroline reminds Booth and Brennan that although it often seems like it around them, murder is not the only crime a person can commit and be charged for.

In the Season 5 episode "The Parts in the Sum of the Whole" which was a flashback episode that told the story of Booth and Brennan's first time working together (approximately 13 months before the start of the series), it was revealed that Caroline once occupied the office which is now Booth's in the J. Edgar Hoover Building and that Booth formerly occupied one of the outside cubicles.

Caroline's importance in the personal and professional lives of the other characters is highlighted in the season 6 premiere, where in the process of trying to save Cam's career, Caroline successfully re-unifies the team (who at that point have scattered around the world) through a combination of cajoling and good-natured blackmail. An impressed Brennan notes that while the rest of the team argued over who was the "lynchpin" of the group, it was Caroline all along. Caroline feigns ignorance, but is clearly touched by Brennan's opinion.

In the show's penultimate episode "A Day in the Life", Caroline acts as the prosecutor at Zach Addy's appeal and argues strongly against Zach's release, earning her the ire of Hodgins. After Zach's murder conviction is overturned but he is ordered to finish out the last thirteen months on his separate sentence for aiding a known killer, Brennan reveals to Zach that Caroline was actually helping them. While she argued against his release, which is her job, she also reminded the judge of their compelling new evidence nineteen different times. Caroline admits to being surprised that Brennan saw through what she did and fondly orders Zach to stay out of trouble.

In the series finale "The End in the End", Caroline looks after Booth and Brennan's children following the bombing of the Jeffersonian by Mark Kovac and jokingly wonders if Judge Judy needs a prosecutor due to the danger. After the death of Kovac, Caroline promises to ensure that his sister will be spending the rest of her life in prison and is relieved to learn that Aubrey has taken a job in Washington rather than moving to Los Angeles.

==== Sam Cullen ====
Portrayed by John M. Jackson

Sam Cullen (season 1) is a Deputy Director of the FBI. Little is known about him, other than he has a wife and a daughter diagnosed with terminal lung cancer. The episode "The Graft in the Girl" revealed she contracted the disease from an illegally sourced bone graft; Brennan and Booth discovered and arrested the criminal responsible. He does his best to keep Agent Booth on track and frequently disapproves of Dr. Brennan's involvement in FBI field investigations. He has not been seen since the first season.

==== Gordon Gordon Wyatt ====
Portrayed by Stephen Fry

Dr. Gordon Gordon Wyatt (seasons 2, 4, 5, 12) is the psychiatrist trained in forensic psychiatry who was assigned to evaluate Agent Seeley Booth in the episode "The Girl in the Gator" after Booth shoots at an ice cream truck. At first, Booth regards his therapy with skepticism but eventually comes to befriend Dr. Wyatt and affectionately call him "Gordon Gordon", based on Dr. Wyatt's way of introducing himself as "Gordon, Gordon Wyatt". According to Booth, Dr. Wyatt is "so English". Dr. Wyatt implies to Booth that his first and middle name are both Gordon. Dr. Wyatt also became involved in the lives of the "squints" in episode "The Priest in the Churchyard", when Booth asked Brennan to come to therapy with him to work out some partnership problems. Brennan, who has repeatedly shown an aversion to psychology, seems to have taken a liking to Dr. Wyatt because what he says makes sense, so much so that she even takes Angela to see him when Angela is unsure of how to respond to Hodgins' request for her to move in with him.

Dr. Wyatt returned in the episode "Mayhem on the Cross" after a time working with Interpol. He points out that Dr. Sweets' observations of Booth and Brennan's relationship are off and in turn, points out to Booth and Brennan that Sweets might be more complex than his chipper demeanor portrays. Dr. Wyatt announced his retirement as a forensic psychiatrist and has enrolled in cooking school. He also reveals his past as "Noddy Comet", a glam rock guitarist, who "wore spandex, pancake makeup, silver lamé and played a guitar shaped like a spaceship".

He briefly returned in Season 5 when Booth was having trouble with his marksmanship after his recent tumor, during which he learned that Booth was in love with Brennan; unlike Sweets, who speculated that the tumor was the reason for Booth's feelings, Dr. Wyatt did not discourage Booth from feeling this way, but instead suggested that Booth has built up an "idea" of him and Brennan as a family, suggesting that she accompany him to his marksmanship test as she would enable him to pass by reminding him that he has her to protect.

Dr. Wyatt made a return and his final appearance in the Season 12 episode "The Steal in the Wheels". No longer a practicing psychiatrist, he has now opened an award-winning restaurant. Dr. Wyatt is brought in to look over Sweets' notes on his sessions with Zach Addy in hopes that he can help them find something to exonerate Zach. He fails at finding anything in the notes, but takes the opportunity to give advice in the case and Booth and Brennan's personal life. Dr. Wyatt comes up with the idea of locating the body of The Gormogon's apprentice, the true killer, and searching the body for possible new evidence to help Zach. Working together, Hodgins and Dr. Wyatt are able to narrow down the most likely locations where the Gormogon buried his apprentice. At the end of the episode, Dr. Wyatt is preparing dinner with Booth and Brennan when Hodgins and Cam call to inform them that Hodgins successfully found the Apprentice's body. On the man's shirt cuff is a bloodstain which, if a match to the victim, could prove to be the evidence they need to clear Zach's name. Dr. Wyatt celebrates the good news with Booth and Brennan and his help in finding the body proves instrumental in securing Zach's exoneration on the murder charges in "The Day in the Life".

==== Marcus Geier ====
Portrayed by David Greenman

Marcus Geier (seasons 2–4) is a forensic technician with the FBI. His first broadcast appearance was as an unnamed tech in the second-season episode "Spaceman in a Crater". (He had been in "Player Under Pressure", an episode which was not aired until the following year.) In the third season, the character was given a name and used in several episodes, starting with "Soccer Mom in the Mini-Van". His role is to present evidence discovered at a crime scene to Booth and/or the squints.

==== Charlie Burns ====
Portrayed by Nathan Dean

Charlie Burns (seasons 2–3) is a special agent of the FBI who sometimes assists Booth. His first appearance is in the second-season episode, "The Truth in the Lye".

==== Tim Sullivan ====
Portrayed by Eddie McClintock

FBI Special Agent Tim "Sully" Sullivan (seasons 2, 12) is introduced in Season 2 to be Dr. Brennan's love interest. He makes four consecutive appearances starting with the episode "The Girl in the Gator", where he works with Dr. Brennan while Booth was sidelined because he shot an ice cream truck clown. At first, Brennan doubted his sincerity because of his wide variety of interests and hobbies—he has a minor in kinesiology and a major in art history, is a certified EMT, a finish carpenter, and a criminal profiler; but Booth assured her Sully is serious about his job and mentions he lost his previous partner. After the case, Sully asked Brennan out on a date, which she eagerly accepted. Their relationship becomes more serious; and, in the episode "The Boneless Bride in the River", Sully asks Brennan to go with him to the Caribbean in his new boat, which he named Temperance, for a year but she refuses. He tells Brennan he will come back in a year's time. He returns, one final time, in the season 12 episode, "The Grief and the Girl", to see how Brennan was coping, having heard about the death of her father. Angela describes him as the only other guy, other than Booth, who'd stood a chance with Brennan.

==== Payton Perotta ====
Portrayed by Marisa Coughlan

FBI Special Agent Payton Perotta (season 4) is an FBI agent who appeared in three episodes beginning with "Fire in the Ice". She filled in for Booth as liaison with the Jeffersonian team when Booth was a murder suspect and when he was incapacitated by a back injury. She also encountered the Jeffersonian team when Booth was kidnapped by the Gravedigger. Although Perotta's presence was specifically requested when Booth was off with his back trouble, Brennan stated that this was simply because it was easier to work with somebody who already knew how they worked rather than any appreciation for Perotta as an Agent. While competent, she lacked the bond with the Jeffersonian team that Booth had developed—when she commented that "her" people had found potentially important evidence for the current case, Hodgins and Wendell, speaking in unison, informed her that they were "Booth's" people.

==== Andrew Hacker ====
Portrayed by Diedrich Bader

Andrew Hacker (season 5) is Seeley Booth's boss and an Assistant Director of the FBI. In Season 5, he expressed a romantic interest in Brennan, to the consternation of Booth. He and Brennan dated several times, though nothing really developed from it. In one episode, he attempted to "rescue" Brennan, Booth, and their friends who were being held at the Jeffersonian by a group of mysterious government agents, only to arrive a few seconds after Booth had already subdued the agents—much to Hacker's disappointment as he had hoped to impress Brennan.

Hacker does not appear in Season 6, although he does call Booth on his cell phone in one episode to inform him about a new case. Brennan does not mention him in Season 6, and with the recent events at the end of the season, it would seem that Brennan and Hacker's relationship ended off screen.

==== Genevieve "Genny" Shaw ====
Portrayed by Tina Majorino

Genny Shaw (seasons 6–7) is a young female FBI special agent and Booth's colleague. She appears in the Season 6 episode "The Hole in the Heart", in which she assists Booth in the capture of renegade sniper Jacob Broadsky. Since then, she has appeared in two additional episodes in Season 7 working alongside Agent Booth. She looks up to Booth and is always eager to please him. She is a single mother of a three-year-old son whom her mother looks after while she is at work.

==== Karen Delfs ====
Portrayed by Sara Rue (seasons 11–12)

Karen Delfs is a talkative behavioral analyst assigned to help Booth and Bones on a case. She asked Agent Aubrey out, but he was seeing Jessica Warren at the time. She transferred to Kansas after a few episodes, but she returned in the first episode of Season 12 after being sexually harassed at her other job by her married boss. She was accused of being the one out to kill Bones (she had the requisite psychological skills to be the one), but was cleared when they discovered the real killer. In the second to last episode, Aubrey got falling down drunk at Cam and Arastoo's wedding reception. Karen had Jessica bring him to her apartment to recover since it was closer to the reception hall. In final episode, she learned that Aubrey and Jessica broke up. She bought him some fried chicken and they went off to eat comfort food and commiserate. The implication was that they were on the verge of starting a relationship.

=== Booth and Brennan family ===
==== Parker Booth ====
Portrayed by Ty Panitz (seasons 1–9), Gavin MacIntosh (seasons 10–11)

Parker Matthew Booth (season 1–) is Seeley Booth and Rebecca Stinson's son. Four years old at the start of the series, Parker and Booth are very close. Parker lives with his mother and Booth has said that his parental rights are "vague" at the very least but he usually gets to take Parker on the weekends. Parker had his own room at Booth and Brennan's old house, which has since been severely damaged in the season 9 finale when Booth was attacked by Delta Force operatives.

Prior to the Season 1 episode "The Man in the Fallout Shelter", none of the "squints" knew that Booth was a father. At the end of the episode, Booth introduces Parker to Bones and gives him a voice-activated robot Zack Addy had made for him as a Christmas present. Parker meets the rest of the Jeffersonian team as well as Sweets and Bones' father Max. Booth has brought him to the Jeffersonian several times and Angela becomes fond of him and nicknames him "Baby Booth".

Rebecca threatened to never let Booth see Parker during Season 2 when he investigated her boyfriend Drew intensively (although in the following season 2 episode, Rebecca and Booth have a short fling when she and Drew are not seeing each other).

In Season 3's Christmas episode, Parker, not wanting to follow his mother and her boyfriend Brent on a skiing trip in Vermont, instead went up to a police officer, told him that he was lost and that his father "works for the FBI" and Booth is forced to take him back to his office; Parker has said that he hated Brent, which his mother believes to be a result of Booth's influence.

In the Season 4 episode "The Finger in the Nest", Parker finds a severed human finger in a bird nest. Instead of being frightened, he is actually quite excited. Booth spends the entire episode concerned that Parker is traumatised, but it turns out that Parker is fine. In fact, he wanted to keep the finger so he could use it to scare away a bully at school. Parker also tells Sweets that he is proud of his father for never running away from danger. A later episode in the season, "The Hero in the Hold", reveals that Booth named Parker after his spotter Corporal Edward "Teddy" Parker, a friend who was slain in the line of duty on a mission that went wrong.

In the Season 5 episode "The Beautiful Day in the Neighborhood", Parker stays with Booth while his mother is away. He repeatedly attempts to set his father up with the women at the Jeffersonian, although it is discovered that he has an ulterior motive: his friend's father got married and bought a house with a swimming pool, so Parker was trying to get his father a girlfriend in the hopes that they would move into a house with a pool. Brennan responds to this discovery by giving Booth and Parker a key to the swimming pool in her apartment building.

In "The Twisted Bones in the Melted Truck", in season 6, Parker meets Booth's new girlfriend Hannah Burley. At first he dislikes her, but eventually they manage to bond. He also names Wizards of Waverly Place as his favorite TV show.

In episode 10 of season 7, Parker returns from England to visit Booth and his new half-sister, Christine. Booth and Brennan are apprehensive about how Parker will react to Christine, and their worries appear to be justified when Parker starts locking himself in his room and cutting up family photos in what appears to be a fit of jealousy. However, at the end of the episode, it is revealed that Parker loves Christine very much and was actually building a mobile which incorporated all of these items, which he hangs over her crib. He had intended for it to be surprise until his father took notice of his unusual behavior.

In the season 9 episode "The Woman in White", Parker returns to attend his father and Brennan's wedding, as his father's best man, and to spend time with his grandmother, Marianne, and his great-grandfather, Hank Booth.

In the season 11 episode "High Treason in the Holiday Season" Parker returns as a surprise for his father, to meet his new baby brother Hank and spend Thanksgiving with his father, step-mother, sister and brother.

==== Russ Brennan ====
Portrayed by Loren Dean

Russ Brennan (seasons 1–3), born Kyle Keenan, is Temperance Brennan's older brother. When Russ was 7, his parents Max and Ruth Keenan changed the whole family's identities to hide and protect them from a gang of bank robbers with whom Max and Ruth previously worked. 12 years later, shortly after the disappearance of their parents, he abandoned Temperance when he was nineteen and she was fifteen years old, due to Temperance's seeming rejection of his efforts to keep the two of them as a family. After he left home, Russ committed various misdemeanors and felonies. He worked as a mechanic in North Carolina, where he became involved with a woman called Amy Hollister, and took on her two daughters Emma & Hayley Hollister as his own. However, after his father resurfaces in "Judas on a Pole", in season 2, he went off-grid so he could pay for Hayley's medical bills. Russ resurfaced during the course of "The Knight on the Grid", in season 3, after learning his stepdaughter Hayley had been hospitalized again with complications related to her cystic fibrosis; he was arrested by Booth and sentenced to thirty days in the county jail, with the term of his probation extended and amended to include the wearing of an ankle monitor. In the following episode, "The Santa in the Slush", the Brennans agree to hold a small family get-together, and to keep Emma & Hayley unaware of Russ being in jail, Russ is allowed to come in civilian clothes instead of prison garb. Russ is mentioned in "The Goop on the Girl", in season 5, by Max, who explains to Temperance that Russ is spending that Christmas with his in-laws (Amy's parents). In the season 11 episode "High Treason in the Holiday Season", Brennan mentions that, that year, Max was spending Thanksgiving with Russ' family. Russ was last mentioned in season 12 episode 8 ("The Grief and the Girl") when Temperance comments that she has scheduled her father's memorial for a time months away so that Russ could attend.

==== Max Keenan ====
Portrayed by Ryan O'Neal

Max Keenan (seasons 2–12), also known as Matthew Brennan, is the father of Russ and Temperance Brennan. When his children were 7 and 3 years old respectively, Max changed the identities of his family to protect them from the gang of violent bank robbers with whom he and his wife worked as career criminals. He becomes "Matthew Brennan", his wife Ruth becomes "Christine Brennan", and their children Kyle and Joy become "Russ Brennan" and "Temperance Brennan". As Matthew Brennan, Max worked as a science teacher, while his wife worked as a bookkeeper. A few days before Christmas in 1991, when Russ was 19 years old and Temperance was 15, Max and his wife, after having just spotted one of their old associates from the gang (Vince McVicar), left for the safety of their children by leading McVicar away, and never returned to the home in order to keep Russ and Temperance hidden. After Temperance solved the murder of her mother, Max warned her to stop looking for him in a message left on her home phone. When Russ became the target of a corrupt Deputy Director of the FBI, Max was forced to resurface and to kill the man. Max resurfaces a second time during the episode "The Killer in the Concrete", when Temperance asks for his help to find Booth, who was kidnapped during the course of the investigation.

After freeing Booth, Max escapes when his daughter willingly lets him use her car. Max was later arrested by Booth at the conclusion of "Stargazer in a Puddle". Max was tried and acquitted for the murder of Deputy Director Kirby in the episode entitled "The Verdict in the Story" (although this was only because the defense revealed that there was reasonable doubt, as his daughter, Temperance, and Agent Booth each had motive, means, and opportunity to kill Kirby as well).

In season 4, in the episode "The Bone That Blew", Max (now going by "Max Brennan") obtained a job at Jeffersonian Institute teaching children; at first, Temperance objected to him working there, claiming he would interfere and that his past as a known criminal would put the validity of evidence in jeopardy, but she finally relented, as a favor to Booth (though she knows it was for her). Max asked Booth if he was sleeping with his daughter, and seemed quite surprised to learn Booth wasn't, asking whether it was because Booth was gay, Temperance wasn't attractive enough, or because her father was a killer, believing he was stopping their relationship.

In Season 5, Max reveals that he is in contact with some of his late wife's relatives, when he invites Brennan's cousin, Margaret, to Christmas dinner ("The Goop on the Girl"). He also attempts to kill Heather Taffet during her trial, when he perceives her as a threat to Dr. Brennan ("The Boy with the Answer"). This leads Booth to believe Max has not abandoned his criminal ways, and to suspect Max's involvement in two murders in Season 6 (those of Heather Taffet and a member of his bowling team), although Max is exonerated in both cases. He also indicates that he has begun dating again and that he always expected Brennan and Booth to "settle down together" ("The Bullet in the Brain").

In Season 7, Max offers to take care of Booth and Brennan's daughter Christine. Despite Brennan's initial reservations, she eventually agrees. In the Season finale, he helps Brennan and Christine get out of town, after Christopher Pelant frames Brennan for the murder of her friend, Ethan Sawyer. When confronted by Booth, Max explains that Brennan has to stay outside the system, if she's to be safe. He also encourages Booth to stay in the system and help prove Brennan's innocence.

During the three months they are on the run, Max and Brennan learn all they can about Pelant, and eventually discover the grave of one of his first victims. Later on in Season 8, Max returns after Brennan is shot while working in the lab. While recovering in the hospital, Brennan gives him a message from her mother, telling Max that her mother knew that the first gift he gave to her was stolen, which takes him by surprise as no one knew that aside from him.

In Season 9, Max returns twice, first to attend Brennan and Booth's wedding, and second to attend Christine's birthday party. During the next few seasons, Max becomes close to Brennan and Booth. He attends many family gatherings. He also takes Christine and Hank, Booth and Brennan's son, most days to school and after, while their parents are at work.

In the middle of Season 12 it seems that Max is keeping something from Brennan. It turns out that he had a pacemaker installed without telling anyone. In season 12, episode 7, "The Scare in the Score", Max is shot while protecting the children, Christine and Hank, and dies in the hospital after his surgery. Brennan is with him when he dies.

Max is characterized as a very protective father who would stop at nothing to protect his children. This becomes a source of conflict for Brennan and Booth who has had to arrest him several times, albeit rather apologetically. Despite this, Max approved of their relationship early on, even before Brennan and Booth themselves acknowledged that they were in love with one another.

==== Jared Booth ====
Portrayed by Brendan Fehr

Jared Booth (seasons 4–5) is a younger brother of Seeley Booth and brother-in-law of Temperance Brennan. A former lieutenant commander and intelligence officer in the United States Navy, his first appearance was in the fourth-season episode, "The Con Man in the Meth Lab", where he arrived in Washington, D.C. to take a new position at The Pentagon. Despite Angela Montenegro's disapproval—she called him "Booth-lite"—and Cam's warnings, Brennan agreed to go to a white tie function as his date. Jared attempts to charm her by insinuating that his brother was an underachiever, and Brennan is furious after realizing his deceit. She embarrasses him by pushing him off his seat at a bar in a fit of rage.

Jared has an on-off drinking problem and had a history of getting into trouble and Seeley taking the blame for him; he once told Seeley "I owe you for digging me out of crap my whole life." When the brothers were young, Seeley would protect Jared from their abusive, alcoholic father from the violent beatings. Jared followed his older brother, father and grandfather into the military. He joined the Navy at the age of 17, implying that he was a "mustang"—an officer who began his career as an enlisted man.

Jared breached protocol to help Brennan save his brother when a serial killer abducted Seeley and left him to die on a decommissioned ship about to be sunk. After much persuasion from Dr. Brennan and the "squint squad", he agreed to help them access a critical piece of evidence (i.e. steal it from the FBI) under the pretext of a "classified" military intelligence operation and Hodgins was able to deduce where Booth was being held captive. It revealed that Jared has since been court-martialled and dishonorably discharged for "misuse of authority" and "theft of government property" after he aided the Jeffersonian team in stealing a critical piece of evidence to save his brother's life. The tension between them has cooled off somewhat since then. In the season 4 episode "The Beaver in the Otter", Jared decides to go traveling around India. After coming to terms with the fact, his brother gives Jared their grandfather's Saint Christopher medallion, (the patron saint of travellers).

He returns, in "The Dentist in the Ditch" in season 5, and introduces his new girlfriend (later fiancée), Padme, to Seeley. Jared asks Seeley to be his best man at their wedding.

Due to acting commitments, Fehr never appeared in Bones after season 5. The character was "killed off" in the season 11 premiere, "The Loyalty in the Lie". It was revealed that Jared and his wife Padme had been separated for several months. Padme was resentful of Dr. Brennan as the latter had told Seeley to stop giving money to Jared, knowing that Jared would spend it on alcohol. Jared had been in debt at that time and he never reconciled with Padme prior to his death. Seeley had attempted to help his brother but was instead forced to watch Jared's corpse burn after things went south. It took detached forensic work on the part of Dr. Brennan to discover that Jared's skeleton was not that of her missing husband, Seeley Booth.

==== Hank Booth ====
Portrayed by Ralph Waite

Hank Booth (seasons 5–9) was Seeley and Jared Booth's paternal grandfather. He was a Korean War veteran and served in the 720th Military Police Battalion and the 82nd Airborne Division. The character was described by series creator Hart Hanson as "Booth's plainspoken, loving, war hero grandfather". Booth called him "Pops" and Hank affectionately called Booth by his childhood nickname "Shrimp".

Booth's grandfather was first mentioned in season 4, but isn't introduced until Season 5 when Hank comes to visit Booth after butting heads with the staff at his retirement home. He quickly takes a liking to Brennan and, when Booth denies being in a relationship with her, deadpans that he "did not raise [Booth] well", apparently approving of them being together despite their repeated denials. Hank reveals to her that he caught his son hitting Seeley and chased him out. From then on he raised the boys as his own children. In "The Foot in the Foreclosure", Hank confides this secret to Seeley's work partner, Temperance Brennan, telling her that she should tell Seeley this and to "hold him" when she does. In the same episode, Hank stays at Seeley's apartment after getting into trouble with the nursing staff at the "Willow River Retirement community", where he was staying at, due to having recently had heart surgery. During his stay, he bonds with Brennan and Lance Sweets, however he realizes he needs to go back after he nearly burns down Seeley's apartment while making grilled cheese. He had also caused a stir at a home depot store by pretending to be the greeter. Hank reappears in Season 7 and tells Booth that the latter's father died of liver failure. However, Seeley's indifference concerns him and Bones. He tells Booth to love Brennan and their unborn daughter and gives him a box from his son. Booth refuses to open it at first, but Brennan convinces him and Booth finally looks at the good memories of his father within, with Brennan at his side comforting him, at the end of the episode.

The Season 9 episode "The Woman in White" was Hank's last appearance due to the unexpected death of actor Ralph Waite. Hart Hanson and Stephen Nathan stated that Hank's death will be addressed at some point in season 10 as the story arc for the end of Season 9 going into the next season had already been planned. Booth and Brennan's second child, conceived in Season 10 and born just before Season 11, is named after Hank.

==== Christine Booth ====
Portrayed by Ali and Susanne Hartman (seasons 7–9); Sunnie Pelant (seasons 9–12)

Christine Angela Booth is the daughter of Seeley Booth and Temperance Brennan. Christine was conceived the night following the death of Vincent Nigel-Murray. She is named after her maternal grandmother, Christine Brennan, and her mother's best friend, Angela Montenegro, who is named Christine's godmother. Her god-brother is Michael Hodgins, who is nine months older than her. Based on comments from her parents and other characters, Christine is said to be highly intelligent like her mother and is cheeky and physical (when playing) like her father.

In the episode "The Prisoner in the Pipe", a couple of weeks before she is due, Brennan goes into labor during a prison riot. The nearest hospital is a half hour away, time that Brennan does not have, which forces Booth to drive to an inn. At first, the owner refuses to allow them inside, but after some pleas from a desperate Booth, and then threats from a pained Brennan, the owner allows them to use a stable so that Brennan can deliver her safely. Christine is born amid tearful laughter from her mother, and Booth and Brennan admire the baby. Brennan later allows her closest friend, Angela, to be the first to hold Christine. She has thus far been nicknamed "Baby Bones", "Baby Booth", and "Stapes" (after the smallest bone in the human body). She started attending day care when she was six weeks old, but when things at the day care did not work out, Booth asked Max, Brennan's father, to watch her while the two of them worked. Christine has an older half-brother via Booth called Parker and they get along very well on their first meeting, with Parker building a mobile for her. She is baptized as a Catholic, her father's faith, at the end of the season, shortly before Brennan takes her and flees town for their safety.

At the beginning of season 8, after three months on the run, her mother's name is cleared and the two are reunited with Booth. In "The Shot in the Dark", it is revealed that Christine is 14 months old. Her birthday is implied to be in between late March and early April. In Season 9, although Christine made fewer appearances (with the exception of many mentions in her parents' conversations), she celebrates her 4th birthday (her current age is further confirmed in "The Money Maker on the Merry-Go-Round", in season 10). In the season 9 finale Brennan is seen driving away from their house with Christine in the car seat while Booth braces himself to be attacked by Delta Force operatives as he booby-traps the entire downstairs of the house. Now a 4-year-old toddler, Christine makes a non-speaking appearance in the premiere of season 10 where Brennan finds her asleep on Booth, himself having fallen asleep reading a bedtime story to her, and tells him that Christine missed him greatly while he was in prison.

In "The Money Maker on the Merry-Go-Round", Christine says her first swear word ("jackass"), and her parents face a parental conflict over their contrasting reactions over this.

Booth and Brennan's colleagues at the FBI and Jeffersonian often babysit Christine and she refers to them as "Uncle" and "Aunt". She was particularly close to the late Dr. Sweets, who babysat her since she was an infant and whom Booth considered to be a surrogate younger brother. Booth's new partner Aubrey once dubbed her "mini Booth" due to her cheeky personality.

==== Hank Booth II ====
Hank Booth II (seasons 11–12) is the infant son of Seeley Booth and Temperance Brennan. He was conceived following Booth's release from wrongful imprisonment during the beginning of season 10. He is named after his great grandfather, Hank Booth. His older sister is Christine Booth, and together through their father, Seeley Booth, they have an older half-brother, Parker Booth. They also have two god-brothers; Michael Staccato Vincent "Michael-Vincent" Hodgins and Seeley Lance Wick-Sweets.

=== Other Jeffersonian Institute family members ===
==== Michelle Welton ====
Portrayed by Dana Davis (first appearance) and Tiffany Hines

Michelle Welton (seasons 4–9, 12) is Dr. Camille Saroyan's adopted daughter. Cam was once engaged to and lived with Michelle's father, Dr. Andrew Welton, a cardiac surgeon, and helped to raise Michelle. However, because Michelle's mother died in childbirth, he was never able to fully commit to their relationship and was constantly cheating. Though Cam did love him, she ended the engagement, leaving Welton and the young Michelle behind. Ten years later, in the Season 4 episode "The Doctor in the Den", his remains are found in a tiger exhibit at a zoo. Upon learning the identity of the remains, Cam takes it upon herself to inform Michelle of her father's death. Michelle claims to barely remember Cam and treats her coldly. Later in the episode, Michelle admits she had been very deeply hurt by Cam's apparent abandonment, and she had waited at the window for weeks, "for [Cam] to come home". At the end of the episode, Michelle and Cam are reconciled and Michelle accepts Cam's offer to move in with her.

In seasons 5 and 6, Cam experiences frequent trouble with Michelle over such teenage issues as Michelle's new boyfriend, smoking, and school. When Michelle decides to go to a small state school to be with her boyfriend, Cam reluctantly agrees but secretly fills out an application in Michelle's name for a more prestigious university, much to the disapproval of her colleagues. When Michelle's relationship with her boyfriend falls apart, Cam reveals that she had successfully, but dishonestly, gotten Michelle into the better school. To her credit, Michelle interprets this as a test of her own honesty, and decides to spend a year working and applying for the next academic year.

Despite having trouble adjusting to her rekindled surrogate relationship with Cam, a fact that is exemplified when she says to Cam - "...You're not my mother...", after the two argue in an episode in season 5, she is later shown to hold a different stance in the penultimate episode of the series, when she refers to Cam as "my mother" and "mom" while giving a speech at the latter's wedding with Arastoo.

==== Michael Hodgins ====
Portrayed by Noah and Jared Botwin-Lazarow (season 6–8); Liam James Ramos (season 9); Arjuna Maximus McLellan (season 10–11)

Michael Staccato Vincent Hodgins (season 6–) is the infant son of Angela Montenegro and Jack Hodgins, and grandson of Billy Gibbons. His name came from several sources: "Michael" was his parents' choice, "Staccato" was his grandfather's, and "Vincent" was in honour of the late Vincent Nigel-Murray, who was killed shortly before Michael's birth. He is often called "Michael Vincent" and sometimes called "Michael" by his parents and their friends. While Angela was pregnant, it was discovered through genetic testing that Michael Vincent could be blind because of a recessive gene that both his parents carry. However, to the relief of his parents, Michael was born with no vision problems.

In season 7, Angela sneaks him into the lab after taking him out of daycare. After Cam catches them, Michael works his charm and she relents, but warns them not to bring him into the forensic labs again. Additionally, it is revealed that Michael relaxes best when being played rock music, (presumably, his grandfather's is the most soothing), a fact discovered when Angela and Hodgins reluctantly allow her father to babysit Michael. In "The Memories in the Shallow Grave", Michael is five months old; in "The Male in the Mail", he is six months old; and in "The Twist in the Twister", he is eight months old.

In the season 8 episode "The Shot in the Dark", it is revealed that Christine is 1 year old, and since Michael Vincent is nine months older than she is, this makes Michael Vincent roughly 2 years old at that time. In the season 9 episode "The Carrot in the Kudzu", Michael attends Christine's birthday party in the park. In season 10 episode 9 ("The Mutilation of the Master Manipulator") it is mentioned that Michael Vincent is allergic to cats.

In season 11 episode 16 ("The Strike in the Chord"), Michael Vincent (played by Arjuna Maximus McLellan) comes to the lab to see his father. Hodgins has lab rats that need a home. When Michael Vincent asks to hold one, he and Hodgins appeal to Angela to let him keep one. The look on Michael's face bonding with his new pet helps Hodgins to decide not to do the risky surgery that might cost him his life and to find another way to fight and get his legs back. The scene was later cut from the finished episode.

==== Jeffrey Hodgins ====
Portrayed by Jonno Roberts (season 9)

He makes his debut appearance in the season 9 episode, "The Heiress in the Hill". The firstborn of the late Jonathan and Anne Hodgins, Jeffrey is the older brother of the Jeffersonian Institute's forensic entomologist, mineralogist and botanist Dr. Jack Hodgins. Jeffrey was diagnosed early in life with a schizo-affective disorder. By the time his mother was pregnant with Jack, Jeffrey needed round-the-clock care, and so his parents committed him into the Sandalwood Home full-time for his own safety and welfare, as well for the safety of his then-unborn brother, Jack Hodgins. Here he has stayed for the past 30 years or so, with the Sandalwood Home receiving very generous donations for his care, and his very existence was kept a secret from his brother Jack. Hodgins only learned about Jeffrey many years later, after the Cantileaver Group was bankrupted by Pelant hacking Hodgins' accounts and the Sandalwood Home could no longer fund Jeffrey's residence, requiring Hodgins to take out a loan until he had a more long-term plan.

Even though he is shown to be quite intelligent and pleasant company, Jeffrey can flare up and sometimes run away from his home only to always come back. Because of his schizo-affective disorder and paranoia (though less-so than Jack Hodgins), Jeffrey believes that there is a static electricity that separates the real with the nonexistent; he also claims that there are only a few people who can "see" through the static.

Jack cares deeply about his older brother after learning of his existence, noting that Jeffrey has their mother's eyes, and the two brothers both share common interests such as a love for Jules Verne, as their father had read Twenty Thousand Leagues Under the Seas to both of them at night before bed back when they were both young.

=== Serial killers ===
==== Howard Epps ====
Portrayed by Heath Freeman

Howard Epps (seasons 1–2) is a serial killer, who appeared in one episode of Season 1 and two episodes of Season 2. Epps was introduced in the episode "The Man on Death Row", where he was a prisoner scheduled to be executed in two days, while his lawyer enlisted Brennan and Booth to try and clear his name. They were successful in delaying his execution pending a further review of new evidence; but the evidence was two dead bodies, killed the same way as the original suspected victim of Epps. Booth realized Epps hoped that they would find these bodies, as the execution would be delayed until it could be determined if he murdered the two as well (which he had). While in prison, he married a woman named Caroline, who knew he was guilty, but believed him to be a good person underneath it all. Most of his victims were blond teenage girls whom he bludgeoned with a tire iron. Unlike his victims, Caroline had brown hair and was about Epps's age herself. It is later revealed that Epps favored blonde women and indulged in pornographic magazines.

Epps' second appearance was in the episode "The Blonde in the Game", where he is still in jail but has been directing a copycat accomplice, leaving clues for Brennan and the team to solve to lead them to the next victims. When Brennan and Booth corner the accomplice, Brennan is forced to shoot him to save the lives of Booth and the final victim. When questioned, Epps reveals the objective of "the game" was to force Brennan to kill. As Epps had planned, Brennan feels deeply guilty for killing the man; but she eventually comes to terms with it.

In his final appearance of the series, "The Man in the Cell", Epps escapes from prison by setting a fire and killing a fireman, stealing his uniform and leaving his body in his own cell with a broken wrist like his own (broken by Dr Brennan in "A Man on Death Row"). It is revealed that he had an IQ of 180 and that his mother was highly religious and would wash him in ammonia whenever he was around women she perceived as "loose". Over time, he developed intense love-hate feelings and would write to her almost every day from prison. After his escape, he becomes obsessed with Brennan, using mind games to make her feel like she was responsible for the deaths of his victims. He tests her and the rest of her team by leaving clues leading them to more victims, one of whom was his wife, Caroline. He also leaves traps in the clues, almost killing Zack and Dr. Saroyan. After being cornered in Brennan's apartment by her and Booth, he runs for the balcony and leaps off. Despite Booth's attempt to save him, he purposefully lets go of Booth's hands, slipping out of his grip and falling to his death.

==== The Gravedigger / Heather Taffet ====
Portrayed By Deirdre Lovejoy

United States Attorney Heather Taffet (seasons 2, 4–6) was the serial killer and kidnapper known as The Gravedigger. As The Gravedigger, she would often kidnap people (usually children), bury them alive in makeshift graves, and contact their families for ransom. If the family provided the funds, she would tell them where the person was buried before the air in the grave ran out; if the funds were not provided, the victim would soon be discovered dead. Not much is known about her. She led a very quiet life and was an FBI agent. She took over the Gravedigger case after the previous attorney assigned to it was killed. She was married at some point for a month in order to rent a storage locker under a false identity. She used the locker to hide her kidnapping equipment. In the episode "Aliens in a Spaceship", she kidnapped Brennan and Hodgins and held them for ransom, albeit she was never on-screen. While the rest of the team succeeded in rescuing them, the Gravedigger's identity was never discovered.

Two seasons later, in "The Hero in the Hold", she kidnapped Booth in order to get evidence that Hodgins had stolen from the FBI. She killed Thomas Vega, who wrote a book on the Gravedigger, but Brennan deduces that Vega broke at least one of his killer's ribs during the fatal struggle. Brennan is suspicious when Taffet brings a warrant to retrieve Vega's body but cannot seem to lift her arm. Brennan confirms Taffet has a broken rib by hitting her in the right place. Jared Booth interrogates her to find out where she took his brother but she refuses to talk. He accesses a government database with secret, illegal files on every United States citizen (referred to as "'spring cleaning'—because everything is brought out and turned upside-down", by Hodgins). He uses this information to determine that she was married for one month before she had the marriage annulled. She used this information to rent a storage locker in Spring Hill. Jared sends an FBI task force to the locker. They find her three-million volt, modified stun gun, gloves, and boots. Hodgins tests the boots to find that there are paint chips that were used in US Navy vessels prior to 1961 in them. Again, accessing the "spring cleaning" files, they find Taffet volunteered at an aquarium that had just sent out a US Navy vessel to be sunk to a reef. Brennan strikes Taffet with a briefcase, knocking her over. Brennan then leaves on a chopper arranged by Jared to go retrieve Booth. Although Jared is arrested for stealing the corpse of Thomas Vega so Brennan and the others could examine it, Seeley Booth is located in time.

In the fifth-season episode "The Boy with the Answer", Taffet is tried and convicted for the kidnapping and murder of a 10-year-old boy. After the kidnapping equipment recovered from Taffet's storage locker in "The Hero in the Hold" is disallowed as illegally obtained, Booth, Bones, and Hodgins drop their own kidnapping charges so that the Jeffersonian scientists can focus on investigating the newly discovered body of the 10-year-old victim. They realize that Taffet intentionally manipulated events to prevent them from working on the new case. Believing Taffet will not get convicted, Brennan's father Max tries to kill her with a sniper rifle, but Booth is able to stop him and Max is put in jail until the trial is over. Despite Taffet ably representing herself in court, DNA evidence showing that the boy bit Taffet during his abduction is enough to convict her. As she is being led away in handcuffs after the trial, she cryptically tells Brennan that "this isn't over".

In the season 6 episode "The Bullet in the Brain", Taffet requests Sweets to accompany her on the way to court for a final appeal and she indirectly tells him that he is the "weakest link" in the food chain in an attempt to sabotage his confidence before the trial, which she does successfully. Sweets is further traumatized because he was standing next to her when on her way into the courthouse Taffet is killed by renegade sniper Jacob Broadsky—a former mentor to Booth—who shoots Taffet in the head from a distant building after having been hired by James Kent, the father of Matthew and Ryan Kent, two of Taffet's victims.

==== Jacob Broadsky ====
Portrayed by Arnold Vosloo

Jacob Ripken Broadsky (season 6) is an ex-military sniper turned vigilante who was once a friend and fellow soldier alongside Seeley Booth. He served in the Gulf War before joining a hostage rescue team in Texas. During this time, he developed a reputation as being the "Hand of God". After one incident in which he killed a gunman without authorization, Broadsky went into hiding and began using other sniper's names—including Booth himself—as aliases. He also developed a personal agenda to assassinate anyone he believed didn't deserve to live, and was willing to kill innocent people who got in his way or defied him (referring to their deaths as "collateral damage"). Broadsky would often contact a victim or former associate of a chosen target and offer his services in exchange for payment, (sometimes the amount of money would be symbolic of the chosen target's crimes).

Broadsky first appears in the Season 6 episode "The Bullet in the Brain" in which he kills Heather Taffet, the Gravedigger, on her way to an appeal, after getting himself hired by James Kent—the father of two of the Gravedigger's victims. He also killed a prostitute in order to use her apartment to assassinate the Gravedigger. Booth tracks Broadsky down but he escapes. Broadsky appears again in "The Killer in the Crosshairs" in which he kills another criminal—a counterfeiter named Walter Coolidge. Booth and Brennan are able to stop him from claiming another victim when Booth (as a skilled counter-sniper) uses Broadsky's own tactics against him but only has a clear shot at his rifle, disarming him and giving Broadsky the chance to escape again. Broadsky returns again in the episode "The Hole in the Heart", in which he kills a former army associate for his rifle (to replace the one Booth destroyed in the previous episode). He then shoots and kills Jeffersonian intern Vincent Nigel-Murray with a bullet meant for Booth. Booth and the Jeffersonian team finally track Broadsky down to his hiding place on a cargo ship. Booth then confronts and shoots Broadsky in the leg, and captures him.

==== Christopher Pelant ====
Portrayed by Andrew Leeds

Christopher Pelant (seasons 7–10) was a villain introduced before the show's hiatus in the seventh season. He is described as extremely intelligent, a computer genius, and is a recurring foe who will cause unusual difficulty for the team. Pelant is a hacktivist, living under house arrest for shutting down the Department of Defense's communications network. Somehow, he is able to kill at least two people despite his ankle monitor showing that he has not left his residence.

He returns in the Season 7 finale, in which he frames Brennan for the murder of her friend, Ethan Sawyer, which forces Brennan to go into hiding. He also frames attorney Caroline Julian by hacking into her bank account and making it appear she was secretly assisting Brennan, which leads to her suspension. Booth is demoted to "desk jockey" because of his relationship with Brennan and the resultant conflict of interest.

Brennan returns in the eighth season première "The Future in the Past" when she finds evidence of an old crime Pelant committed that allows him to be re-arrested, but Pelant creates fake citizenship records for himself and is transferred to Egypt. In that episode, Sweets decoded Sawyer's triangle code and concluded that, for unknown reasons, Pelant "wants one of us to kill him", foreshadowing the latter's death; it is likely that Pelant developed an infatuated fixation on Brennan because he knew that it would provoke Booth further.

Later, in Season 8, episode 12 "The Corpse on the Canopy" Pelant returns to America to exact revenge on the Jeffersonian team. This time, he targets Jack Hodgins, who had nearly strangled Pelant to death in their previous encounter. After first planting a corpse above Angela and Hodgins' bed, Pelant infiltrates a private military company, hijacks a Predator drone and programs it to attack a school for girls in Afghanistan. At the same time, he hacks into Hodgins' financial accounts and starts draining his money, forcing Hodgins to choose between saving the school and saving his money. Hodgins chooses to sacrifice his money and goes broke as a consequence. Booth and an FBI SWAT team raid the PMC in an attempt to arrest Pelant, but Pelant escapes and severely injures Agent Flynn in the process. Booth is able to shoot and wound Pelant as he escapes. Pelant is next shown to be stitching a wound in his own face.

Pelant returns targeting various FBI agents involved in a controversial assault on a cult ten years earlier, using the daughter of one of the agents killed in the raid to act as a proxy killer. Although they capture the girl, Pelant forces Booth to break Brennan's heart by informing him that he will kill five innocent people if Booth marries Brennan, although Booth also vows to stop Pelant.

Pelant makes his final appearance in "The Sense in the Sacrifice", where he turns the Jeffersonian team's plan to "flush" him out against them by murdering Booth's colleague, Special Agent Hayes Flynn. During the investigation and autopsy, the team realize that Pelant had deliberately used Brennan's defleshing techniques and sent subtle clues using content from Sweets' old dissertations and research papers. Sweets deduces that Pelant was infatuated with Brennan and was trying to seduce her using Sweets' research—Sweets' conclusion that Brennan, despite her hyper-rationalism, can change her mind about people, as proven in Booth's case. This also proves to be his motive for preventing Booth from marrying Brennan.

Pelant also informs her of the existence of another serial killer, later referred to as "the Ghost Killer". Using clues and hints, he lures Brennan to an abandoned power plant, knowing that Booth would eventually follow her. Although Brennan was armed, Pelant manages to disarm her using a booby trap. Booth catches up from behind Pelant but the latter pulls out a detonator and holds Brennan hostage, forcing them to choose one over the other; Sweets has predicted that Pelant would most likely kill Brennan once he finds out that she would never reciprocate his feelings. Brennan pleads with Booth to kill a shocked Pelant and Booth eventually fatally shoots him before he was able to detonate the bomb.

Despite his death, Pelant appears in another episode "The Ghost in the Killer" in which he shows up in one of Brennan's dreams to taunt her about the alleged Ghost Killer, whom Brennan has become obsessed with finding. Despite their history, Brennan believes that Pelant was telling the truth about the Ghost Killer being a woman. Both Brennan and Pelant are proven to be correct when Stephanie McNamara is identified as the Ghost Killer following her own murder.

Pelant was one of the few serial killers who has affected every single member of the team; he frames Brennan and Caroline, causes Cam's lab to come under suspicion, murders several of Booth's FBI colleagues, plants a body in Hodgins and Angela's master bedroom and depletes Hodgins' family wealth, and manipulates Sweets' research.

At the end of Season 10, a murder victim is discovered to have been hunting for the money Pelant stole from Hodgins; Pelant's theft of that money has become a legendary crime. After the man's killer is apprehended, Angela reveals to Hodgins that she was able to use the man's information to locate all of the money. However, Hodgins decides that he doesn't want it and instead has Angela quietly donate it to various charities. Along with the money is found a video message from Pelant to Brennan. After a moment, Brennan shuts it off without hearing what he had to say.

==== The Ghost Killer / Stephanie McNamara ====
Portrayed by Kelly Rutherford

The Ghost Killer (season 9) was a serial killer who had been active and evading justice for decades. The Ghost Killer is first alluded to in "The Sense in the Sacrifice" by Christopher Pelant shortly before his death; he states that he may or may not know the individual personally, but has "reason to believe that she is a woman". The killer's modus operandi is to take a fingernail from the victim's middle finger as a trophy.

In the episode "The Ghost in the Killer", Brennan begins to obsess over the Ghost Killer; this prompts Cam to reassign a case to Clark Edison to ensure an objective eye. The case involves the powerful McNamara family, who are acquaintances of Hodgins. The evidence points to Trent McNamara, an old friend of Hodgins; Trent supposedly commits suicide as a result. Brennan, on the other hand, believes that Trent was murdered by the Ghost Killer due to Christopher Pelant telling Brennan that the Ghost Killer was a woman before his own death. Despite everyone believing her, there isn't enough evidence for an investigation.

The character's final appearance is in "The Nail in the Coffin". The body of Stephanie McNamara is found hung in a forest, and the investigators discover that she wears actual human nails that are not her own. After further investigation, it is revealed that McNamara was, in fact, the Ghost Killer. In the past, she was locked in a tack room by her mentally unstable father for wrongdoing. In an attempt to claw her way out, she lost her fingernails, and she took the nails of her victims to reclaim what she felt her father had taken from her. By exhuming the remains of Maya Zinkow, a girl thought to have been killed by her teacher Herman Kessler, it is discovered that McNamara had, in fact, killed her after her father raped the girl. It is further revealed McNamara's father bribed several public officials to pin the crime on Kessler. The team realizes that Kessler, who had been in prison for twenty years, killed McNamara to settle his score; his reasoning was that she wouldn't have been brought to justice due to her powerful family. Kessler then attempts to commit suicide, but is prevented from doing so by Booth. Booth later states that they are making a deal with Kessler in order to discover the identity of the FBI agent who helped her father cover up Maya's rape and murder.

==== Roger Flender ====
Portrayed by Jason Gray-Stanford (Season 10)

==== The Puppeteer / Mihir Roshan ====
Portrayed by Ravi Kapoor

The Puppeteer (seasons 11–12) is the final serial killer in the series. He appears in seasons 11 and 12. Once he kills, he keeps his victim's bodies for months at a time, then he puts the remains in a place he thinks the Jeffersonian team will find them. His moniker is derived from his practice of carving holes into the bones of his victim's bodies, turning them into real-life puppets.

In the episode "The Final Chapter: The Hope in the Horror", it is revealed that he wants control and will do anything to get his way. One of his final victims was made to look like Brennan. He also has been gaslighting Zach Addy such that Zach believes he is the Puppeteer. However, during the season 12 premiere "The Hope in the Horror", it is revealed that the Puppeteer is actually Mihir Roshan, Zach's doctor. Roshan has a split personality, that of his identical conjoined twin who died many years before.

Roshan attempts to murder Zach after Zach is convinced that he's the Puppeteer, but Zach fights back. However, Zach can't bring himself to kill Roshan, even in self-defense. Booth arrives after the team figures out the truth and shoots Roshan dead from behind moments before he can kill Zach.

In the aftermath of Roshan's death, Zach confesses that he did not kill the lobbyist as he had previously claimed to as The Gormogon's apprentice. Zach explains that he was convinced he would have committed the murder if ordered to do so, but his inability to kill Roshan, even in self-defense, proved him wrong. Booth and Brennan believe Zach and set out to help exonerate him.

==== Mark Kovac ====
Portrayed by Gerardo Celasco

Mark Kovac (season 12) is the son of Josip Radik, a warlord killed by Booth in Kosovo during his sniper days. He is first indirectly mentioned by Booth during Season 1's "The Soldier on the Grave" when Booth tells Brennan about killing Radik and his remorse about doing it in front of Radik's son, at the boy's birthday party.

Kovac appears in person during Season 12 where he seeks revenge upon Booth for his father's death, going so far as to target Booth's friends and family. During an attack on Booth's children, Kovac's efforts lead to the death of Brennan's father, Max Keenan. Kovac is subsequently arrested for his crimes.

In the penultimate episode of the series "The Day in the Life", Kovac escapes from prison and resumes his rampage. At the end of the episode, the Jeffersonian is bombed by Kovac, though Booth discovers one of the bombs in time to disarm it and evacuate most of the staff. Multiple other bombs go off, heavily damaging the building and wrecking the lab.

In the series finale "The End in the End", Booth, Brennan, Hodgins and Angela survive the bombing due to Booth disarming one of the bombs in time, but are left trapped in the wrecked lab. The group is eventually rescued, but Brennan suffers a head injury that renders her unable to remember a vital clue she found in the remains of Kovac's accomplice in the prison break that she had believed could lead them to Kovac. While Brennan's interns attempt to figure out what Brennan saw, Booth and Aubrey interrogate Kovac's wife Jeannine while Cam and Hodgins search the bomb Booth disarmed for clues. Through DNA left on the bomb, the team are able to identify Jeannine as the bomber and Kovac's sister instead of his wife. The interns are able to find clues in the remains pointing to Kovac's hideout.

During a final confrontation with the FBI, Kovac attacks with a machine gun while driving a jeep, resulting in Booth suffering a hand injury that leaves him unable to fire his gun. Brennan regains her knowledge of anatomy in time to fix Booth's hand. As Kovac makes a final charge at Booth and Brennan in his jeep, Booth shoots him in the head, killing Kovac instantly. Kovac's jeep crashes over a small cliff into a pile of oil drums below, blowing Kovac's body and his jeep up. In the aftermath, prosecutor Caroline Julian promises to ensure that Kovac's sister Jeannine will spend the rest of her life in prison for her role in his crimes. Brennan's agnosia is almost gone by episode's - and series' -end .

=== Other recurring characters ===
==== Hannah Burley ====
Portrayed by Katheryn Winnick

Hannah Burley is a recurring character in the sixth season. She was Booth's girlfriend, a journalist he met in Afghanistan.

Booth meets Hannah in Afghanistan after saving her from a situation with armed men. Since Booth had been rejected by Brennan in Season 5, the two form a bond and start a relationship. Booth tells Brennan that their relationship is as "serious as a heart attack" and that he is in love with her. Hannah transfers to D.C. and moves in with Booth, even meeting his son and becoming friends with Bones. Although Bones has lingering feelings for Booth, she tries to be happy for their relationship and maintains her friendship with Hannah. However, from Season 6 Episode 11 ("The Bullet in the Brain"), Booth showed signs that he was not as in love with Hannah as he thought he was and he still holds his feelings for Brennan. In "The Daredevil in the Mold", Booth, scared of being alone for the rest of his life and spurred on by a night of drinking with Sweets, proposes to Hannah, who gently turns him down, telling him that she is not the marrying kind. Now knowing that their relationship was going nowhere and has no future, Booth breaks up with her and after trying to persuade him to change his mind (unsuccessfully), she reluctantly accepts the break-up and moves out of his apartment.

==== Oliver Laurier ====
Portrayed by Chris Conner

Oliver Laurier (season 1–2) first appeared in the series is in the pilot episode as a suspect in the murder of Cleo Louise Eller, with whom he was obsessed. Towards the end of the episode, Oliver becomes obsessed with Dr. Brennan, who he stalks from scene to scene. His next appearance was in the second season's episode, "The Bodies in the Book", where he is again suspected of murder. He confesses to being a "Brennanite"—a loyal fan of Dr. Brennan's crime novels—but was proved not to be the killer due to his fainting at the sight of blood. He tells Booth on multiple occasions he has a fight-or-flight response that almost inevitably turns to "flight" usually after locking the door to his house. He is not known to have ever done anything violent.

==== Paul Lidner ====
Portrayed by Elon Gold

Dr. Paul Lidner (season 5–6) is a gynecologist whom Cam met when bringing Michelle for an OB/GYN appointment in Season 5. Cam and Paul developed an attraction to each other, though Cam was unsure of how to proceed. Their work schedules interfered with their budding relationship; but, in Season 6, they managed to set aside time for each other. Cam now appears to be much more comfortable in the relationship. Her adopted daughter Michelle was all right with this, but asked that someone else besides Lidner be her gynecologist from now on. By season 8, it is revealed that their relationship has ended some time along the way but the details are never discussed on screen.

==== Alex Radziwill ====
Portrayed by Danny Woodburn

Alex Razdiwill (seasons 2, 8 and 10) is an employee of the State Department. As such, he is often required to thwart Booth and Brennan by telling them how international law and foreign policy obstruct what they want to do; but the character is sympathetic, and it is made clear that he is not merely an officious bureaucrat, but a good-hearted person who is sympathetic to the FBI team in wishing justice to be done. He is a little person; this is a plot point in the episode when he first appears—such as Bones commenting that Booth is being less confrontational to avoid hurting Razdiwill's 'tiny feelings', clarifying that she was referring to his feelings about being tiny rather than meaning that his "feelings" were tiny—but afterwards is not important to the role. In one case, Razdiwill makes a joke about his height, claiming to a suspect that "they need someone low to the ground to deal with the bottom feeders."

==== Sid Shapiro ====
Portrayed by Heavy D

Sid Shapiro (season 1) is the owner of a Chinese restaurant, Wong Fu's. He has a talent for knowing exactly what to serve a customer without even asking, although he will take orders. Booth is a frequent customer and a personal friend; in "The Man in the Fallout Shelter", he brought his son, Parker, to visit him while quarantined at the Jeffersonian. He never appears after season 1.

==== Rebecca Stinson ====
Portrayed by Jessica Capshaw

Rebecca Stinson (season 2) is Booth's ex-girlfriend and the mother of his son, Parker. When Seeley discovered Rebecca was pregnant, he asked her to marry him but she refused. It is later revealed she refused the proposal because she did not want to be "one of those women" and did not want to be judged. She later tells Temperance she now wishes she had not missed her and Seeley's "one true moment" and wonders if he feels the same way, which is shown throughout the series.

== Other ==
Amy Morton (S1E07)
Portrayed by Rachelle Lefevre

Idealistic lawyer who opposes the death penalty. She became Howard Epps' defense attorney during his last weeks on death row.

Billy F. Gibbons (S1E09, S2E21, S4E19, S5E22, S6E15, S7E05 and S10E10)
Portrayed by Billy F. Gibbons

Angela's father. Known for seeing Angela's view no matter what, he is also the lead guitarist of a band. Said band is implied to be this universe's version of ZZ Top, the band in which Gibbons plays real life.

David Simmons (S1E15, S1E22)
Portrayed by Coby Ryan McLaughlin

A man whom Brennan met on an online dating site.

Amy Cullen (S1E20)
Portrayed by Alexandra Krosney

The daughter of FBI Deputy Director Sam Cullen.

Vince McVicar (S1E22)
Portrayed by Pat Skipper

A hitman of the crew Brennan's parents worked with as criminals.

Caroline Epps (S2E04 and S2E12)
Portrayed by Christie Lynn Smith

Caroline was serial killer Howard Epps' wife, and later his murder victim.

Thomas Vega (S2E09 and S4E14)
Portrayed by Benito Martinez in S2 and Marco Sanchez in S4

A former FBI special agent, he made his career writing a book about the serial killer known as the Gravedigger before he was killed by Heather Taffet, the Gravedigger herself.

Janine O'Connell (S2E09)
Portrayed by Julie Ann Emery.

FBI Deputy Director Robert Kirby (S2E11)
Portrayed by Ryan Cutrona

A former Marine sniper and corrupt agent involved in a cover-up several decades ago, he was killed by Max Keenan/Matthew Brennan, who had discovered evidence of the cover-up during his last theft.

Doug Doyley (S3E01)
Portrayed by Raphael Sbarge

Private investigator hired by Hodgins and Angela to find Angela's husband.

Dr. Bancroft (S3E06)
Portrayed by Xander Berkeley

He is revealed to be the top boss of the Jeffersonian by Angela and Cam when Brennan says "Who's Bancroft again?".

Felicia Saroyan (S3E06)
Portrayed by Rochelle Aytes

Camille Saroyan's sister.

Amy Hollister (S3E08 and S3E09)
Portrayed by Bess Wohl

Russ' girlfriend, who has two daughters.

Emma and Hayley Hollister (S3E08 and S3E09)
Portrayed by Antonia Fuller and Skye Arens

Amy's daughters. Hayley has cystic fibrosis.

April Presa (S3E10)
Portrayed by Senta Moses

Sweets' ex-girlfriend.

Pam Nunan (S3E14)
Portrayed by Jennifer Hasty

A murder victim's stalker, who after his death, begins to stalk Booth. She later tries to shoot Brennan at a nightclub.

Grayson Barasa (S4E01 and S4E26)
Portrayed by Sean Blakemore

A man who Angela drunkenly married in Fiji.

Dr. Ian Wexler (S4E01)
Portrayed by Andrew Buchan

Described by Booth as the English equivalent of Dr. Brennan. Brennan turned down the offer to sleep with him because Booth felt that she deserved more than a quick fling. He was later killed by one of his graduate students.

Inspector Cate Pritchard (S4E01)
Portrayed by Indira Varma

A Scotland Yard inspector, described by Booth as his English counterpart due to her working relationship with Dr. Wexler. She helped Booth and Brennan investigate Wexler's murder.

Scott Starret (S4E04 and S10E10)
Portrayed by Michael Badalucco

Brennan's oldest graduate student.

Roxie Lyon (S4E08, S4E10 and S4E17)
Portrayed by Nichole Hiltz

Angela's ex-girlfriend from art school.

Stewie Griffin (S4E25)

Portrayed by Seth MacFarlane

Stewie appeared as the result of a brain tumor-induced hallucination that Booth was suffering from.

Perry Wilson (S5E03)
Portrayed by Michael B. Jordan

Michelle’s boyfriend who meets Cam, Brennan and Booth.

John Collins (S5E06)
Portrayed by Sean Bridgers

Josh Parsons (S5E06)
Portrayed by Andrew J. West

A disgruntled animals rights protester who orders the tar and feathering of Booth and Brennan.

Katie Selnik (S5E08)
Portrayed by Sarah Rafferty

A gutsy real estate agent for a house where a body is discovered.

Margaret Whitesell (S5E10)
Portrayed by Zooey Deschanel

A second cousin of Dr. Brennan on her mother's side.

Mr. White (S5E12)
Portrayed by Richard T. Jones

A mysterious government agent who ordered Dr. Brennan and her colleagues to determine the cause of death for a set of unknown remains—which Brennan and the others come to believe are those of President John F. Kennedy.

Catherine Bryar (S5E18)
Portrayed by Rena Sofer

A marine biologist and a suspect in a case, she was implied to have some romantic interest in Booth, but it was never pursued.

FBI Special Agent Olivia Sparling (S8E03, S8E15)
Portrayed by Danielle Panabaker

An FBI special agent who helps Sweets investigate a case, when Booth is asked to take on a desk assignment to get his department's budget approved. She also shows a romantic interest in Sweets which is not pursued further than an apologetic kiss and a perfunctory night together.

Christine Brennan (S8E15)
Portrayed by Larisa Miller and Brooke Langton

Christine Brennan, also known as Ruth Keenan, is Dr. Temperance Brennan's deceased mother.

Marianne Booth (S8E22, S9E06)
Portrayed by Joanna Cassidy

Marianne Booth is the mother of Seeley and Jared Booth. Little is known about her background but Booth stated that she was a dancer and wrote jingles. She left the family when the boys were young.

Zane Reynolds (S8E24)
Portrayed by Beau Knapp

A suspect who is taking orders from Christopher Pelant.

Aldo Clemens (S9E01, S9E04, S9E06 and S10E10)
Portrayed by Mather Zickel

A former Army chaplain and Catholic priest who now owns a bar called "Paradise Lost". He has known Booth from his time in the service.

CIA Special Agent Danny Beck (S9E01 and S9E16)
Portrayed by Freddie Prinze, Jr.

He is a long-time friend of Booth's from their days in the Army; they served in the Special Forces together.
