= Bones season 12 =

Bones
- Season 12
- Promotional poster
- No. of episodes: 12

Release
- Original network: Fox
- Original release: January 3 – March 28, 2017

Season chronology
- ← Previous; Season 11

The twelfth and final season of the American television series Bones premiered on January 3, 2017, and concluded on March 28, 2017, on Fox. The final season consists of 12 episodes and aired on Tuesdays at 9:00 pm ET.

== Cast and characters ==
=== Main cast ===
- Emily Deschanel as Dr. Temperance "Bones" Brennan, a forensic anthropologist at the Jeffersonian, and wife of Seeley Booth
- David Boreanaz as FBI Special Agent Seeley Booth and husband of Temperance Brennan
- Michaela Conlin as Angela Montenegro, a forensic artist and wife of Jack Hodgins
- Tamara Taylor as Dr. Camille Saroyan, a forensic pathologist and the head of the forensic division
- T. J. Thyne as Dr. Jack Hodgins, an entomologist, mineralogist, palynologist, and forensic chemist, and husband of Angela Montenegro.
- John Boyd as James Aubrey, an FBI agent who works under Booth

=== Recurring cast ===
- Patricia Belcher as Caroline Julian, a prosecutor who often works with the team
- Eric Millegan as Dr. Zack Addy, former Jeffersonian employee
- Eddie McClintock as Tim "Sully" Sullivan, a former FBI agent with whom Brennan had a previous relationship
- Stephen Fry as Gordon Wyatt, Booth's former psychiatrist, now a chef
- Ryan O'Neal as Max Brennan, Temperance's father
- Sara Rue as Karen Delfs, a behavioral analyst
- Sunnie Pelant as Christine Booth, Seeley and Temperance's daughter
- Guy Boyd as Philip Aubrey, James's father
- Cyndi Lauper as Avalon Harmonia, a psychic
- Tiffany Hines as Michelle Welton, Cam's adopted daughter

Interns

- Michael Grant Terry as Wendell Bray
- Carla Gallo as Dr. Daisy Wick
- Pej Vahdat as Dr. Arastoo Vaziri
- Laura Spencer as Jessica Warren
- Joel David Moore as Dr. Colin Fisher
- Ignacio Serricchio as Dr. Rodolfo Fuentes
- Eugene Byrd as Dr. Clark Edison

== Production ==
Fox renewed Bones for a 12-episode final season on February 25, 2016. The season was initially announced to debut in the fall of 2016, but Fox delayed the premiere until January 3, 2017. Former series regular Eric Millegan, who returned in the season 11 finale, continues his role as Zack Addy in the final season. The season features the return of former recurring characters, including Eddie McClintock as Tim "Sully" Sullivan, who recurred during season two, and Stephen Fry as Gordon Wyatt, who made guest appearances in seasons two, four and five. Betty White reprises her season 11 role as Dr. Beth Mayer in the tenth episode, while veteran actors Ed Asner and Hal Holbrook guest star in the third episode. Filming of the season, and of the entire series, wrapped up on December 15, 2016.

== Episodes ==
No. overall	No. in season	Title	Directed by	Written by	Original release date	Prod. code	US viewers (millions)
235	1	"The Hope in the Horror"	Emily Deschanel	Michael Peterson	January 3, 2017	CAKY01	3.43
Brennan has been kidnapped by Zack, but Booth finds them within the Jeffersonian basement, knowing Zack's methods. Zack kidnapped Brennan because he knew the real killer was putting her life in danger, but everyone is convinced that Zack is guilty of the Puppeteer murders, especially Booth, as the evidence against him piles up. However, the discovery of half a body from twenty years before shakes up the case and reveals the true killer to be Dr. Roshan, the head of the facility where Zack was being held. As Roshan tries to end Zack's life by tricking him, Zack finds himself unable to truly retaliate, even while in mortal peril. Booth saves the day by killing Roshan before Roshan can inject Zack with a toxin. Zack tells Booth and Brennan that he did not kill the lobbyist and asks them to reinvestigate, to which Booth agrees.
236	2	"The Brain in the Bot"	Ian Toynton	Hilary Weisman Graham	January 10, 2017	CAKY02	3.31
The team investigates the death of a man who created artificially intelligent robots to assist children with autism. Brennan celebrates her 40th birthday and surprises her co-workers by nominating Angela for the MacArthur genius grant and helping Daisy get a job at the National Forensics Lab, showing how she has learned to appreciate the success of others. Booth surprises Brennan with a gift as well: Zack's appeal date being set a few months hence. Meanwhile, Max reappears for his daughter's birthday, but drops what appears to be a hospital armband, indicating an illness.
237	3	"The New Tricks in the Old Dogs"	David Grossman	Ted Peterson	January 17, 2017	CAKY03	2.92
The team experiences retirement home drama when they find the body of an old man at an acid dump site. Meanwhile, Booth and Brennan discuss the possibility of having more children and Cam and Arastoo plan on adopting a child.
238	4	"The Price for the Past"	Randy Zisk	Jonathan Collier	January 24, 2017	CAKY04	3.05
The team investigates the murder of Aldo Clemmons, an ex-priest who counseled Booth and also married Booth and Brennan. Booth learns that Aldo killed himself in order to protect Booth's identity from a killer who is connected to one of Booth's military kills. Meanwhile, Caroline Julian informs Aubrey that his convict father has returned to the country.
239	5	"The Tutor in the Tussle"	Dwight Little	Eric Randall	January 31, 2017	CAKY05	3.76
When a tutor of privileged students is found dead, the team sorts through all the possible perpetrators, including a roommate with a criminal record and a fellow tutor who'd been losing clients. Meanwhile, Aubrey's con-artist father returns, but Aubrey chooses to turn him in to the FBI.
240	6	"The Flaw in the Saw"	Denise Di Novi	Yael Zinkow	February 7, 2017	CAKY06	3.07
The death of a female lumberjack brings Booth and Brennan to investigate a lumberjack competition. Meanwhile, Hodgins reanalyzes evidence from the lobbyist case in the hopes that he can exonerate Zack.
241	7	"The Scare in the Score"	Randy Zisk	Joe Hortua	February 14, 2017	CAKY08	2.97
More deaths connected to Booth's military past and Aldo's death begin to appear, causing Booth to worry for his family's safety. Booth and Brennan place their two children along with Brennan's father Max into protective custody at a safehouse. Brennan believes her father is hiding something from her and he reveals that he had a pacemaker installed. The safehouse is attacked, leaving several agents dead, and Max is taken to the hospital with a gunshot wound. Booth learns the killer is Mark Kovac, the son of a war criminal he killed 20 years ago now seeking revenge. After his surgery, Max recounts a dream he had to Brennan and then suddenly dies.
242	8	"The Grief and the Girl"	Anton Cropper	Karine Rosenthal	February 21, 2017	CAKY07	2.90
Booth and Aubrey travel to Newfoundland when an American woman is found murdered. Brennan tries to deal with the recent death of her father and receives a visit from former lover Tim "Sully" Sullivan.
243	9	"The Steal in the Wheels"	Robert Reed Altman	Hilary Weisman Graham & Ted Peterson	March 7, 2017	CAKY09	2.89
Booth, Brennan, and Aubrey go undercover at a demolition derby to investigate a murder. Meanwhile, Dr. Gordon Wyatt returns and assists Hodgins in the Gormogon case and intern Rodolfo Fuentes receives his doctorate to become a forensic anthropologist. With the help of Gordon Wyatt and Angela, Hodgins is able to locate the body of Gormogon's original apprentice, the true killer of the lobbyist that Zack Addy is serving a life sentence for murdering. On the apprentice's sleeve is blood, presumably that of the lobbyist, and the proof they need to exonerate Zack.
244	10	"The Radioactive Panthers in the Party"	Michael Lange	Keith Foglesong	March 14, 2017	CAKY10	2.52
The team investigates the death of an aspiring filmmaker and one of the suspects ends up being actor David Faustino. Aubrey acts as lead on the case and is later offered a promotion as a supervisory special agent in Los Angeles. Meanwhile, Brennan speaks with Dr. Beth Mayer about being passionate for one's work and, in turn, advises Wendell that forensic anthropology might not be his passion and he should seek a career that he truly loves.
245	11	"The Day in the Life"	Ian Toynton	Eric Randall & Yael Zinkow	March 21, 2017	CAKY11	3.55
This episode is told from the point-of-view of each of the six main characters, with each act following the character during Cam and Arastoo's wedding reception and the day after. Cam tells Brennan she'll be taking an extended honeymoon and plans on stepping down as head of the Jeffersonian. Hodgins testifies at Zack's trial but is kicked out of the courtroom after he interrupts Caroline Julian's closing arguments. Aubrey asks Jessica to move with him to Los Angeles, which makes her reevaluate their relationship and end it. Angela is sick, presumably from the night before, but reveals to Brennan that she's pregnant. At Zack Addy's appeal, Hodgins testifies about the blood evidence found on the body of Gormogon's apprentice (discovered in "The Steel in the Wheels"), which proves Zack's innocence, and Brennan testifies to his character. Based on the new evidence, Zack is exonerated of murder, and his life sentence is overturned. However, the judge determines that he must finish out the last 13 months of his separate sentence for helping the actual killer since he is, in fact, guilty of that crime. While Zack isn't released as the others had hoped, he accepts his sentence, acknowledging that 13 months is nothing compared to the life sentence he was previously facing. At the wedding reception, Booth goes to see Avalon (at the request of Angela), who warns him that she had a vision of Brennan in danger. The team discovers that Mark Kovac has escaped from prison and is after Booth. Booth goes to the Jeffersonian, and they learn Cam's security ID is missing but was used in the middle of night. Everyone evacuates the Jeffersonian, but Booth, Brennan, Angela, and Hodgins are left stuck inside. Booth disarms a bomb planted under the forensic platform, but the bomb was on a repeater, revealing that there are multiple bombs. Several explosions go off within the Jeffersonian.
246	12	"The End in the End"	David Boreanaz	Teleplay by : Jonathan Collier & Michael Peterson & Karine Rosenthal; Story by : Stephen Nathan	March 28, 2017	CAKY12	4.35
In the series finale, the Jeffersonian suffers heavy damage from the bomb blasts, but Booth, Angela, Hodgins, and Brennan survive thanks to Booth disarming one of the bombs in time. They are eventually rescued, but Brennan suffers a minor brain injury that keeps her from understanding complex concepts and remembering a vital clue she discovered on the body of Kovac's latest victim before the blast. With Brennan incapacitated, Daisy Wick, Clark Edison, Arastoo Vaziri, Jessica Warren, and Wendell Bray pull together to use everything Brennan taught them to figure it out for themselves. The interns eventually determine that Brennan found clues pointing to a childhood home of the victim that Kovac is using as a hideout. At the same time, Hodgins and Cam examine the bomb Booth disarmed and find the DNA of the bomb maker: Jeannine Kovac, Mark Kovac's supposed wife who is really his sister. The Kovac siblings are revealed to have been working together to get revenge for their father's death and Jeannine refuses to cooperate. Using the information gathered by the interns, Booth, Brennan, and Aubrey lead a SWAT team to Kovac's hideout, where Kovac attacks with a machine gun. Booth suffers an injury to his hand and Brennan's brain heals in time for her to fix it, allowing Booth to kill Kovac. With Kovac dead, the team clears out the lab in preparation for its reconstruction. Hodgins is left in charge of the Jeffersonian while Cam and Arastoo go on a leave of absence to pick up their three adopted sons in Mississippi. Aubrey accepts a position as supervisory special agent in D.C. (as opposed to the earlier-offered position in Los Angeles), having concluded that he belongs in D.C. after recent events, and agrees to share some fried chicken with Karen (possibly implying the start of a new relationship). Caroline Julian promises to ensure that Jeannine Kovac will be locked up for the rest of her life for her role in Mark's crimes. Booth and Brennan sit on the bench outside the Jeffersonian and reminisce.

== Reception ==
On Rotten Tomatoes, the season has an approval rating of 93%, with an average score of 7.7/10 and based on 14 reviews. The website's critical consensus reads: "A charming conclusion, Bones' final season digs deeps and delivers a fitting send-off to a beloved series."

== DVD release ==
The twelfth and final season of Bones was released on DVD (subtitled "The Final Chapter") in region 1 on June 13, 2017. The set includes all 12 episodes of season twelve and special features include a gag reel and a featurette, "Back to the Lab: A Bones Retrospective".
