= List of Bones episodes =

Bones is an American crime drama television series created by Hart Hanson that premiered on Fox on September 13, 2005.

The show is based on forensic anthropology and forensic archaeology, with each episode focusing on an FBI case concerning the mystery behind human remains brought by FBI Special Agent Seeley Booth (David Boreanaz) to the forensic anthropologist Dr. Temperance "Bones" Brennan (Emily Deschanel). The rest of the main cast includes Michaela Conlin as forensic artist Angela Montenegro, T. J. Thyne as entomologist Dr. Jack Hodgins, Eric Millegan as Dr. Zack Addy (seasons 1–3; guest, 4–5, 11–12), Jonathan Adams as Dr. Daniel Goodman (season 1), Tamara Taylor as pathologist Dr. Camille Saroyan (seasons 2–12), John Francis Daley as psychologist Dr. Lance Sweets (seasons 3–10), and John Boyd as FBI agent James Aubrey (seasons 10–12).

During the course of the series, 246 episodes of Bones aired over twelve seasons, between September 13, 2005, and March 28, 2017.

== Series overview ==
| Season | Episodes | Originally released | |
| Season | Episodes | First released | Last released |
|---|---|---|---|
| 1 | 22 | September 13, 2005 | May 17, 2006 |
| 2 | 21 | August 30, 2006 | May 16, 2007 |
| 3 | 15 | September 25, 2007 | May 19, 2008 |
| 4 | 26 | September 3, 2008 | May 14, 2009 |
| 5 | 22 | September 17, 2009 | May 20, 2010 |
| 6 | 23 | September 23, 2010 | May 19, 2011 |
| 7 | 13 | November 3, 2011 | May 14, 2012 |
| 8 | 24 | September 17, 2012 | April 29, 2013 |
| 9 | 24 | September 16, 2013 | May 19, 2014 |
| 10 | 22 | September 25, 2014 | June 11, 2015 |
| 11 | 22 | October 1, 2015 | July 21, 2016 |
| 12 | 12 | January 3, 2017 | March 28, 2017 |

== Episodes ==
=== Season 1 (2005–06) ===
| No. overall | No. in season | Title | Directed by | Written by | Original release date | Prod. code | US viewers (millions) |
|---|---|---|---|---|---|---|---|
| 1 | 1 | "Pilot" | Greg Yaitanes | Hart Hanson | September 13, 2005 | 1AKY79 | 10.79 |
| 2 | 2 | "The Man in the S.U.V." | Allan Kroeker | Stephen Nathan | September 20, 2005 | 1AKY02 | 7.39 |
| 3 | 3 | "A Boy in a Tree" | Patrick Norris | Hart Hanson | September 27, 2005 | 1AKY01 | 7.87 |
| 4 | 4 | "The Man in the Bear" | Allan Kroeker | Laura Wolner | November 1, 2005 | 1AKY04 | 7.99 |
| 5 | 5 | "A Boy in a Bush" | Jesús Treviño | Steve Blackman & Greg Ball | November 8, 2005 | 1AKY05 | 6.86 |
| 6 | 6 | "The Man in the Wall" | Tawnia McKiernan | Elizabeth Benjamin | November 15, 2005 | 1AKY06 | 8.84 |
| 7 | 7 | "A Man on Death Row" | David Jones | Noah Hawley | November 22, 2005 | 1AKY03 | 7.25 |
| 8 | 8 | "The Girl in the Fridge" | Sanford Bookstaver | Dana Coen | November 29, 2005 | 1AKY07 | 7.64 |
| 9 | 9 | "The Man in the Fallout Shelter" | Greg Yaitanes | Hart Hanson | December 13, 2005 | 1AKY08 | 7.12 |
| 10 | 10 | "The Woman at the Airport" | Greg Yaitanes | Teresa Lin | January 25, 2006 | 1AKY10 | 11.37 |
| 11 | 11 | "The Woman in the Car" | Dwight Little | Noah Hawley | February 1, 2006 | 1AKY09 | 12.64 |
| 12 | 12 | "The Superhero in the Alley" | James Whitmore Jr. | Elizabeth Benjamin | February 8, 2006 | 1AKY12 | 11.91 |
| 13 | 13 | "The Woman in the Garden" | Sanford Bookstaver | Laura Wolner | February 15, 2006 | 1AKY13 | 11.87 |
| 14 | 14 | "The Man on the Fairway" | Tony Wharmby | Steve Blackman | March 8, 2006 | 1AKY14 | 11.82 |
| 15 | 15 | "Two Bodies in the Lab" | Allan Kroeker | Stephen Nathan | March 15, 2006 | 1AKY15 | 12.07 |
| 16 | 16 | "The Woman in the Tunnel" | Joe Napolitano | Greg Ball & Steve Blackman | March 22, 2006 | 1AKY11 | 11.14 |
| 17 | 17 | "The Skull in the Desert" | Donna Deitch | Jeff Rake | March 29, 2006 | 1AKY17 | 11.24 |
| 18 | 18 | "The Man with the Bone" | Jesús Treviño | Craig Silverstein | April 5, 2006 | 1AKY16 | 10.14 |
| 19 | 19 | "The Man in the Morgue" | James Whitmore Jr. | Noah Hawley & Elizabeth Benjamin | April 19, 2006 | 1AKY18 | 10.28 |
| 20 | 20 | "The Graft in the Girl" | Sanford Bookstaver | Laura Wolner & Greg Ball | April 26, 2006 | 1AKY19 | 10.33 |
| 21 | 21 | "The Soldier on the Grave" | Jonathan Pontell | Stephen Nathan | May 10, 2006 | 1AKY20 | 9.50 |
| 22 | 22 | "The Woman in Limbo" | Jesús Treviño | Hart Hanson | May 17, 2006 | 1AKY21 | 9.07 |

=== Season 2 (2006–07) ===
| No. overall | No. in season | Title | Directed by | Written by | Original release date | Prod. code | US viewers (millions) |
|---|---|---|---|---|---|---|---|
| 23 | 1 | "The Titan on the Tracks" | Tony Wharmby | Hart Hanson | August 30, 2006 | 2AKY01 | 8.61 |
| 24 | 2 | "The Mother and Child in the Bay" | Jesús Treviño | Stephen Nathan | September 6, 2006 | 2AKY02 | 9.13 |
| 25 | 3 | "The Boy in the Shroud" | Sanford Bookstaver | Gary Glasberg | September 13, 2006 | 2AKY03 | 8.59 |
| 26 | 4 | "The Blonde in the Game" | Bryan Spicer | Noah Hawley | September 20, 2006 | 2AKY04 | 7.55 |
| 27 | 5 | "The Truth in the Lye" | Steven DePaul | Scott Williams | September 27, 2006 | 2AKY05 | 7.80 |
| 28 | 6 | "The Girl in Suite 2103" | Karen Gaviola | Christopher Ambrose | October 4, 2006 | 2AKY06 | 8.10 |
| 29 | 7 | "The Girl with the Curl" | Thomas J. Wright | Karine Rosenthal | November 1, 2006 | 2AKY07 | 7.33 |
| 30 | 8 | "The Woman in the Sand" | Kate Woods | Elizabeth Benjamin | November 8, 2006 | 2AKY08 | 7.52 |
| 31 | 9 | "Aliens in a Spaceship" | Craig Ross Jr. | Janet Tamaro | November 15, 2006 | 2AKY09 | 7.83 |
| 32 | 10 | "The Headless Witch in the Woods" | Tony Wharmby | Stephen Nathan & Karine Rosenthal | November 29, 2006 | 2AKY10 | 8.66 |
| 33 | 11 | "Judas on a Pole" | David Duchovny | Hart Hanson | December 13, 2006 | 2AKY11 | 8.62 |
| 34 | 12 | "The Man in the Cell" | Jesús Treviño | Noah Hawley | January 31, 2007 | 2AKY12 | 12.40 |
| 35 | 13 | "The Girl in the Gator" | Allan Kroeker | Scott Williams | February 7, 2007 | 2AKY13 | 12.57 |
| 36 | 14 | "The Man in the Mansion" | Dwight Little | Christopher Ambrose | February 14, 2007 | 2AKY14 | 12.28 |
| 37 | 15 | "The Bodies in the Book" | Craig Ross Jr. | Karine Rosenthal | March 14, 2007 | 2AKY15 | 10.36 |
| 38 | 16 | "The Boneless Bride in the River" | Tony Wharmby | Gary Glasberg | March 21, 2007 | 2AKY16 | 10.47 |
| 39 | 17 | "The Priest in the Churchyard" | Scott Lautanen | Lyla Oliver | March 28, 2007 | 2AKY17 | 10.58 |
| 40 | 18 | "The Killer in the Concrete" | Jeff Woolnough | Dean Widenmann | April 4, 2007 | 2AKY18 | 10.53 |
| 41 | 19 | "Spaceman in a Crater" | Jeannot Szwarc | Elizabeth Benjamin | May 2, 2007 | 2AKY20 | 10.56 |
| 42 | 20 | "The Glowing Bones in the Old Stone House" | Caleb Deschanel | Stephen Nathan | May 9, 2007 | 2AKY21 | 10.23 |
| 43 | 21 | "Stargazer in a Puddle" | Tony Wharmby | Hart Hanson | May 16, 2007 | 2AKY22 | 10.88 |

=== Season 3 (2007–08) ===
| No. overall | No. in season | Title | Directed by | Written by | Original release date | Prod. code | US viewers (millions) |
|---|---|---|---|---|---|---|---|
| 44 | 1 | "The Widow's Son in the Windshield" | Ian Toynton | Hart Hanson | September 25, 2007 | 3AKY01 | 8.40 |
| 45 | 2 | "Soccer Mom in the Mini-Van" | Allan Kroeker | Elizabeth Benjamin | October 2, 2007 | 3AKY03 | 7.98 |
| 46 | 3 | "Death in the Saddle" | Craig Ross Jr. | Josh Berman | October 9, 2007 | 3AKY02 | 8.48 |
| 47 | 4 | "The Secret in the Soil" | Steven DePaul | Karine Rosenthal | October 23, 2007 | 3AKY04 | 8.94 |
| 48 | 5 | "Mummy in the Maze" | Marita Grabiak | Scott Williams | October 30, 2007 | 3AKY05 | 8.85 |
| 49 | 6 | "Intern in the Incinerator" | Jeff Woolnough | Christopher Ambrose | November 6, 2007 | 3AKY06 | 9.52 |
| 50 | 7 | "Boy in the Time Capsule" | Chad Lowe | Janet Lin | November 13, 2007 | 3AKY07 | 9.12 |
| 51 | 8 | "The Knight on the Grid" | Dwight Little | Noah Hawley | November 20, 2007 | 3AKY08 | 8.70 |
| 52 | 9 | "The Santa in the Slush" | Jeff Woolnough | Elizabeth Benjamin & Scott Williams | November 27, 2007 | 3AKY10 | 9.62 |
| 53 | 10 | "The Man in the Mud" | Scott Lautanen | Janet Tamaro | April 14, 2008 | 3AKY11 | 8.54 |
| 54 | 11 | "Player Under Pressure" | Jessica Landaw | Janet Tamaro | April 21, 2008 | 2AKY19 | 8.64 |
| 55 | 12 | "The Baby in the Bough" | Ian Toynton | Karine Rosenthal | April 28, 2008 | 3AKY09 | 9.68 |
| 56 | 13 | "The Verdict in the Story" | Jeannot Szwarc | Christopher Ambrose | May 5, 2008 | 3AKY13 | 8.13 |
| 57 | 14 | "The Wannabe in the Weeds" | Gordon C. Lonsdale | Josh Berman | May 12, 2008 | 3AKY12 | 9.42 |
| 58 | 15 | "The Pain in the Heart" | Allan Kroeker | Hart Hanson & Stephen Nathan | May 19, 2008 | 3AKY14 | 10.15 |

=== Season 4 (2008–09) ===
| No. overall | No. in season | Title | Directed by | Written by | Original release date | Prod. code | US viewers (millions) |
|---|---|---|---|---|---|---|---|
| 59 60 | 1 2 | "The Yanks in the U.K." | Ian Toynton | Hart Hanson & Karine Rosenthal Stephen Nathan & Scott Williams | September 3, 2008 | 3AKY19 3AKY20 | 9.17 10.22 |
| 61 | 3 | "The Man in the Outhouse" | Steven DePaul | Carla Kettner & Mark Lisson | September 10, 2008 | 3AKY16 | 8.91 |
| 62 | 4 | "The Finger in the Nest" | Jeff Woolnough | Lyla Oliver | September 17, 2008 | 3AKY17 | 9.71 |
| 63 | 5 | "The Perfect Pieces in the Purple Pond" | Jeannot Szwarc | Josh Berman | September 24, 2008 | 4AKY01 | 9.61 |
| 64 | 6 | "The Crank in the Shaft" | Steven DePaul | Elizabeth Benjamin | October 1, 2008 | 3AKY18 | 9.82 |
| 65 | 7 | "The He in the She" | Craig Ross Jr. | Karina Csolty | October 8, 2008 | 3AKY15 | 10.34 |
| 66 | 8 | "The Skull in the Sculpture" | Allan Kroeker | Janet Lin | November 5, 2008 | 4AKY03 | 10.09 |
| 67 | 9 | "The Con Man in the Meth Lab" | Allison Liddi-Brown | Karine Rosenthal | November 12, 2008 | 4AKY04 | 10.87 |
| 68 | 10 | "The Passenger in the Oven" | Steven DePaul | Carla Kettner | November 19, 2008 | 4AKY05 | 10.73 |
| 69 | 11 | "The Bone That Blew" | Jessica Landaw | Carla Kettner | November 26, 2008 | 4AKY02 | 9.76 |
| 70 | 12 | "Double Trouble in the Panhandle" | Dwight Little | Lyla Oliver | January 22, 2009 | 4AKY06 | 9.97 |
| 71 | 13 | "Fire in the Ice" | Chad Lowe | Scott Williams | January 22, 2009 | 4AKY07 | 7.52 |
| 72 | 14 | "The Hero in the Hold" | Ian Toynton | Janet Lin & Karine Rosenthal | February 5, 2009 | 4AKY08 | 10.76 |
| 73 | 15 | "The Princess and the Pear" | Steven DePaul | Matthew Donlan & Jeremy Martin | February 19, 2009 | 4AKY09 | 9.50 |
| 74 | 16 | "The Bones That Foam" | David Boreanaz | Elizabeth Benjamin | March 12, 2009 | 4AKY10 | 9.55 |
| 75 | 17 | "The Salt in the Wounds" | Steven DePaul | Carla Kettner & Josh Berman | March 19, 2009 | 4AKY11 | 10.19 |
| 76 | 18 | "The Doctor in the Den" | Ian Toynton | Janet Lin & Karine Rosenthal | April 2, 2009 | 4AKY12 | 8.98 |
| 77 | 19 | "The Science in the Physicist" | Brad Turner | Karina Csolty | April 9, 2009 | 4AKY13 | 8.88 |
| 78 | 20 | "The Cinderella in the Cardboard" | Steven DePaul | Carla Kettner & Josh Berman | April 15, 2009 | 4AKY14 | 10.76 |
| 79 | 21 | "Mayhem on a Cross" | Jeff Woolnough | Dean Lopata | April 16, 2009 | 4AKY15 | 8.72 |
| 80 | 22 | "The Double Death of the Dearly Departed" | Milan Cheylov | Craig Silverstein | April 20, 2009 | 4AKY16 | 8.38 |
| 81 | 23 | "The Girl in the Mask" | Ian Toynton | Michael Peterson | April 23, 2009 | 4AKY17 | 8.22 |
| 82 | 24 | "The Beaver in the Otter" | Brad Turner | Scott Williams | April 30, 2009 | 4AKY18 | 8.83 |
| 83 | 25 | "The Critic in the Cabernet" | Kevin Hooks | Stephen Nathan | May 7, 2009 | 4AKY19 | 8.62 |
| 84 | 26 | "The End in the Beginning" | Ian Toynton | Hart Hanson | May 14, 2009 | 4AKY20 | 8.70 |

=== Season 5 (2009–10) ===
| No. overall | No. in season | Title | Directed by | Written by | Original release date | Prod. code | US viewers (millions) |
|---|---|---|---|---|---|---|---|
| 85 | 1 | "Harbingers in a Fountain" | Ian Toynton | Hart Hanson | September 17, 2009 | 5AKY01 | 10.36 |
| 86 | 2 | "The Bond in the Boot" | Alex Chapple | Michael Peterson | September 24, 2009 | 5AKY02 | 9.12 |
| 87 | 3 | "The Plain in the Prodigy" | Allan Kroeker | Karine Rosenthal | October 1, 2009 | 5AKY03 | 9.43 |
| 88 | 4 | "The Beautiful Day in the Neighborhood" | Gordon C. Lonsdale | Janet Lin | October 8, 2009 | 5AKY04 | 10.29 |
| 89 | 5 | "A Night at the Bones Museum" | Jeannot Szwarc | Carla Kettner & Josh Berman | October 15, 2009 | 5AKY05 | 9.59 |
| 90 | 6 | "The Tough Man in the Tender Chicken" | Dwight Little | Dean Lopata | November 5, 2009 | 5AKY06 | 8.66 |
| 91 | 7 | "The Dwarf in the Dirt" | Chad Lowe | Karyn Usher | November 12, 2009 | 5AKY07 | 10.22 |
| 92 | 8 | "The Foot in the Foreclosure" | Jeff Woolnough | Pat Charles | November 19, 2009 | 5AKY08 | 9.88 |
| 93 | 9 | "The Gamer in the Grease" | Kate Woods | Dean Lopata | December 3, 2009 | 5AKY09 | 9.92 |
| 94 | 10 | "The Goop on the Girl" | Tim Southam | Carla Kettner | December 10, 2009 | 5AKY10 | 10.90 |
| 95 | 11 | "The X in the File" | Allison Liddi-Brown | Janet Lin | January 14, 2010 | 5AKY11 | 10.67 |
| 96 | 12 | "The Proof in the Pudding" | Emile Levisetti | Bob Harris | January 21, 2010 | 5AKY12 | 11.93 |
| 97 | 13 | "The Dentist in the Ditch" | Dwight Little | Pat Charles & Josh Berman | January 28, 2010 | 5AKY13 | 12.37 |
| 98 | 14 | "The Devil in the Details" | Ian Toynton | Michael Peterson | February 4, 2010 | 5AKY14 | 12.37 |
| 99 | 15 | "The Bones on the Blue Line" | Chad Lowe | Carla Kettner | April 1, 2010 | 5AKY15 | 8.44 |
| 100 | 16 | "The Parts in the Sum of the Whole" | David Boreanaz | Hart Hanson | April 8, 2010 | 5AKY16 | 9.99 |
| 101 | 17 | "The Death of the Queen Bee" | Allan Kroeker | Mark Lisson | April 15, 2010 | 5AKY17 | 9.92 |
| 102 | 18 | "The Predator in the Pool" | Dwight Little | Karyn Usher | April 22, 2010 | 5AKY18 | 9.01 |
| 103 | 19 | "The Rocker in the Rinse Cycle" | Jeff Woolnough | Karine Rosenthal | April 29, 2010 | 5AKY19 | 9.28 |
| 104 | 20 | "The Witch in the Wardrobe" | François Velle | Kathy Reichs | May 6, 2010 | 5AKY20 | 9.05 |
| 105 | 21 | "The Boy with the Answer" | Dwight Little | Stephen Nathan | May 13, 2010 | 5AKY21 | 9.20 |
| 106 | 22 | "The Beginning in the End" | Ian Toynton | Hart Hanson & Stephen Nathan | May 20, 2010 | 5AKY22 | 9.21 |

=== Season 6 (2010–11) ===
| No. overall | No. in season | Title | Directed by | Written by | Original release date | Prod. code | US viewers (millions) |
|---|---|---|---|---|---|---|---|
| 107 | 1 | "The Mastodon in the Room" | Ian Toynton | Hart Hanson | September 23, 2010 | 6AKY01 | 9.79 |
| 108 | 2 | "The Couple in the Cave" | Milan Cheylov | Stephen Nathan | September 30, 2010 | 6AKY02 | 9.75 |
| 109 | 3 | "The Maggots in the Meathead" | Tim Southam | Dean Lopata | October 7, 2010 | 6AKY03 | 9.24 |
| 110 | 4 | "The Body and the Bounty" | Dwight Little | Michael Peterson | October 14, 2010 | 6AKY04 | 9.58 |
| 111 | 5 | "The Bones That Weren't" | Jeannot Szwarc | Pat Charles | November 4, 2010 | 6AKY05 | 9.26 |
| 112 | 6 | "The Shallow in the Deep" | Mark Helfrich | Carla Kettner | November 11, 2010 | 6AKY06 | 9.20 |
| 113 | 7 | "The Babe in the Bar" | Tim Southam | Karine Rosenthal | November 18, 2010 | 6AKY07 | 9.40 |
| 114 | 8 | "The Twisted Bones in the Melted Truck" | Gordon C. Lonsdale | Josh Berman | December 2, 2010 | 6AKY09 | 8.83 |
| 115 | 9 | "The Doctor in the Photo" | Ian Toynton | Carla Kettner | December 9, 2010 | 6AKY08 | 8.36 |
| 116 | 10 | "The Body in the Bag" | Kate Woods | Janet Lin | January 20, 2011 | 6AKY11 | 10.55 |
| 117 | 11 | "The Bullet in the Brain" | David Boreanaz | Karyn Usher | January 27, 2011 | 6AKY10 | 12.05 |
| 118 | 12 | "The Sin in the Sisterhood" | Rob Hardy | Karyn Usher | February 3, 2011 | 6AKY12 | 10.20 |
| 119 | 13 | "The Daredevil in the Mold" | Dwight Little | Dean Lopata | February 10, 2011 | 6AKY13 | 9.94 |
| 120 | 14 | "The Bikini in the Soup" | Ian Toynton | Lyla Oliver | February 17, 2011 | 6AKY14 | 9.84 |
| 121 | 15 | "The Killer in the Crosshairs" | Milan Cheylov | Michael Peterson | March 10, 2011 | 6AKY15 | 10.49 |
| 122 | 16 | "The Blackout in the Blizzard" | David Boreanaz | Karine Rosenthal | March 17, 2011 | 6AKY16 | 11.61 |
| 123 | 17 | "The Feet on the Beach" | Emile Levisetti | Pat Charles | April 7, 2011 | 6AKY18 | 10.58 |
| 124 | 18 | "The Truth in the Myth" | Chad Lowe | Jonathan Goldstein & John Francis Daley | April 14, 2011 | 6AKY19 | 11.45 |
| 125 | 19 | "The Finder" | Daniel Sackheim | Hart Hanson | April 21, 2011 | 6AKY17 | 10.96 |
| 126 | 20 | "The Pinocchio in the Planter" | François Velle | Keith Foglesong | April 28, 2011 | 6AKY20 | 9.70 |
| 127 | 21 | "The Signs in the Silence" | Dwight Little | Janet Lin & Stephen Nathan | May 5, 2011 | 6AKY21 | 10.94 |
| 128 | 22 | "The Hole in the Heart" | Alex Chapple | Teleplay by : Carla Kettner & Karyn Usher; Story by : Carla Kettner | May 12, 2011 | 6AKY22 | 10.48 |
| 129 | 23 | "The Change in the Game" | Ian Toynton | Hart Hanson & Stephen Nathan | May 19, 2011 | 6AKY23 | 9.83 |

=== Season 7 (2011–12) ===
| No. overall | No. in season | Title | Directed by | Written by | Original release date | Prod. code | US viewers (millions) |
|---|---|---|---|---|---|---|---|
| 130 | 1 | "The Memories in the Shallow Grave" | Ian Toynton | Stephen Nathan | November 3, 2011 | 7AKY01 | 10.00 |
| 131 | 2 | "The Hot Dog in the Competition" | Dwight Little | Michael Peterson | November 10, 2011 | 7AKY02 | 8.64 |
| 132 | 3 | "The Prince in the Plastic" | Alex Chapple | Dean Lopata | November 17, 2011 | 7AKY03 | 8.76 |
| 133 | 4 | "The Male in the Mail" | Kevin Hooks | Pat Charles | December 1, 2011 | 7AKY04 | 8.91 |
| 134 | 5 | "The Twist in the Twister" | Jeannot Szwarc | Karine Rosenthal | December 8, 2011 | 7AKY05 | 8.11 |
| 135 | 6 | "The Crack in the Code" | Ian Toynton | Carla Kettner | January 12, 2012 | 7AKY06 | 8.64 |
| 136 | 7 | "The Prisoner in the Pipe" | Kate Woods | Jonathan Collier | April 2, 2012 | 7AKY07 | 8.39 |
| 137 | 8 | "The Bump in the Road" | Dwight Little | Keith Foglesong | April 9, 2012 | 7AKY08 | 7.56 |
| 138 | 9 | "The Don't in the Do" | Jeannot Szwarc | Janet Lin | April 16, 2012 | 7AKY09 | 7.15 |
| 139 | 10 | "The Warrior in the Wuss" | Chad Lowe | Dean Lopata & Michael Peterson | April 23, 2012 | 7AKY10 | 7.38 |
| 140 | 11 | "The Family in the Feud" | Dwight Little | Pat Charles & Janet Lin | April 30, 2012 | 7AKY11 | 7.16 |
| 141 | 12 | "The Suit on the Set" | Emile Levisetti | Karine Rosenthal | May 7, 2012 | 7AKY12 | 7.02 |
| 142 | 13 | "The Past in the Present" | David Boreanaz | Carla Kettner | May 14, 2012 | 7AKY16 | 7.21 |

=== Season 8 (2012–13) ===
| No. overall | No. in season | Title | Directed by | Written by | Original release date | Prod. code | US viewers (millions) |
|---|---|---|---|---|---|---|---|
| 143 | 1 | "The Future in the Past" | Ian Toynton | Hart Hanson & Stephen Nathan | September 17, 2012 | 8AKY01 | 7.98 |
| 144 | 2 | "The Partners in the Divorce" | Allison Liddi-Brown | Michael Peterson | September 24, 2012 | 8AKY02 | 7.61 |
| 145 | 3 | "The Gunk in the Garage" | Kate Woods | Jonathan Collier | October 1, 2012 | 7AKY15 | 6.99 |
| 146 | 4 | "The Tiger in the Tale" | Dwight Little | Dean Lopata | October 8, 2012 | 8AKY03 | 7.20 |
| 147 | 5 | "The Method in the Madness" | Kate Woods | Keith Foglesong | November 5, 2012 | 8AKY04 | 7.30 |
| 148 | 6 | "The Patriot in Purgatory" | François Velle | Stephen Nathan | November 12, 2012 | 7AKY14 | 6.96 |
| 149 | 7 | "The Bod in the Pod" | Tim Southam | Pat Charles | November 19, 2012 | 8AKY05 | 7.11 |
| 150 | 8 | "The But in the Joke" | Ian Toynton | Keith Foglesong | November 26, 2012 | 7AKY13 | 7.96 |
| 151 | 9 | "The Ghost in the Machine" | Milan Cheylov | Hart Hanson | December 3, 2012 | 7AKY17 | 7.29 |
| 152 | 10 | "The Diamond in the Rough" | Alex Chapple | Nkechi Okoro Carroll | January 14, 2013 | 8AKY06 | 8.04 |
| 153 | 11 | "The Archaeologist in the Cocoon" | Jeannot Szwarc | Sanford Golden & Karen Wyscarver | January 14, 2013 | 8AKY07 | 7.79 |
| 154 | 12 | "The Corpse on the Canopy" | Rob Hardy | Jonathan Collier | January 21, 2013 | 8AKY09 | 8.53 |
| 155 | 13 | "The Twist in the Plot" | Milan Cheylov | Kim Clements | January 28, 2013 | 8AKY08 | 9.25 |
| 156 | 14 | "The Doll in the Derby" | Tawnia McKiernan | Michael Peterson | February 4, 2013 | 8AKY10 | 9.06 |
| 157 | 15 | "The Shot in the Dark" | François Velle | Dave Thomas | February 11, 2013 | 8AKY11 | 8.82 |
| 158 | 16 | "The Friend in Need" | Jeffrey Walker | Dean Lopata | February 18, 2013 | 8AKY12 | 8.47 |
| 159 | 17 | "The Fact in the Fiction" | Dwight Little | Keith Foglesong | February 25, 2013 | 8AKY13 | 8.77 |
| 160 | 18 | "The Survivor in the Soap" | Tim Southam | Nkechi Okoro Carroll | March 4, 2013 | 8AKY14 | 8.41 |
| 161 | 19 | "The Doom in the Gloom" | Kate Woods | Sanford Golden & Karen Wyscarver | March 18, 2013 | 8AKY15 | 7.58 |
| 162 | 20 | "The Blood from the Stones" | François Velle | Pat Charles | March 25, 2013 | 8AKY16 | 6.96 |
| 163 | 21 | "The Maiden in the Mushrooms" | Jeannot Szwarc | Lyla Oliver | April 1, 2013 | 8AKY17 | 7.05 |
| 164 | 22 | "The Party in the Pants" | Reggie Hudlin | Michael Peterson & Keith Foglesong | April 15, 2013 | 8AKY18 | 6.56 |
| 165 | 23 | "The Pathos in the Pathogens" | Chad Lowe | Kim Clements | April 22, 2013 | 8AKY19 | 7.06 |
| 166 | 24 | "The Secret in the Siege" | David Boreanaz | Stephen Nathan & Jonathan Collier | April 29, 2013 | 8AKY20 | 7.36 |

=== Season 9 (2013–14) ===
| No. overall | No. in season | Title | Directed by | Written by | Original release date | Prod. code | US viewers (millions) |
|---|---|---|---|---|---|---|---|
| 167 | 1 | "The Secrets in the Proposal" | Ian Toynton | Hart Hanson & Stephen Nathan | September 16, 2013 | 9AKY01 | 7.76 |
| 168 | 2 | "The Cheat in the Retreat" | Alex Chapple | Nkechi Okoro Carroll | September 23, 2013 | 9AKY02 | 6.74 |
| 169 | 3 | "El Carnicero en el Coche" | Ian Toynton | Jonathan Collier & Dean Lopata | September 30, 2013 | 8AKY22 | 7.26 |
| 170 | 4 | "The Sense in the Sacrifice" | Kate Woods | Jonathan Collier | October 7, 2013 | 9AKY03 | 7.30 |
| 171 | 5 | "The Lady on the List" | Chad Lowe | Pat Charles | October 14, 2013 | 9AKY04 | 7.30 |
| 172 | 6 | "The Woman in White" | Kevin Hooks | Karine Rosenthal | October 21, 2013 | 9AKY05 | 7.60 |
| 173 | 7 | "The Nazi on the Honeymoon" | Jeannot Szwarc | Dave Thomas | November 4, 2013 | 9AKY06 | 6.97 |
| 174 | 8 | "The Dude in the Dam" | Kevin Hooks | Kathy Reichs & Kerry Reichs | November 11, 2013 | 8AKY21 | 7.35 |
| 175 | 9 | "The Fury in the Jury" | Dwight Little | Sanford Golden & Karen Wyscarver | November 15, 2013 | 9AKY07 | 5.18 |
| 176 | 10 | "The Mystery in the Meat" | Tim Southam | Michael Peterson | November 22, 2013 | 9AKY08 | 5.78 |
| 177 | 11 | "The Spark in the Park" | Chad Lowe | Emily Silver | December 6, 2013 | 9AKY09 | 6.91 |
| 178 | 12 | "The Ghost in the Killer" | Allison Liddi-Brown | Nkechi Okoro Carroll | January 10, 2014 | 9AKY10 | 6.88 |
| 179 | 13 | "Big in the Philippines" | David Boreanaz | Keith Foglesong | January 17, 2014 | 9AKY11 | 6.78 |
| 180 | 14 | "The Master in the Slop" | Dwight Little | Dave Thomas | January 24, 2014 | 9AKY12 | 7.49 |
| 181 | 15 | "The Heiress in the Hill" | Milan Cheylov | Dean Lopata | January 31, 2014 | 9AKY13 | 6.78 |
| 182 | 16 | "The Source in the Sludge" | Ian Toynton | Jonathan Collier | March 10, 2014 | 9AKY14 | 6.55 |
| 183 | 17 | "The Repo Man in the Septic Tank" | Jeffrey Walker | Michael Peterson | March 17, 2014 | 9AKY15 | 5.63 |
| 184 | 18 | "The Carrot in the Kudzu" | Rob Hardy | Sanford Golden & Karen Wyscarver | March 24, 2014 | 9AKY16 | 5.82 |
| 185 | 19 | "The Turn in the Urn" | Tim Southam | Pat Charles | March 31, 2014 | 9AKY17 | 5.72 |
| 186 | 20 | "The High in the Low" | Anne Renton | Keith Fogelsong | April 7, 2014 | 9AKY18 | 6.58 |
| 187 | 21 | "The Cold in the Case" | Milan Cheylov | Emily Silver | April 14, 2014 | 9AKY19 | 5.79 |
| 188 | 22 | "The Nail in the Coffin" | Ian Toynton | Dean Lopata | April 21, 2014 | 9AKY20 | 5.97 |
| 189 | 23 | "The Drama in the Queen" | Jeannot Szwarc | Megan McNamara | May 12, 2014 | 9AKY21 | 6.38 |
| 190 | 24 | "The Recluse in the Recliner" | David Boreanaz | Stephen Nathan & Jonathan Collier | May 19, 2014 | 9AKY22 | 6.04 |

=== Season 10 (2014–15) ===
| No. overall | No. in season | Title | Directed by | Written by | Original release date | Prod. code | US viewers (millions) |
|---|---|---|---|---|---|---|---|
| 191 | 1 | "The Conspiracy in the Corpse" | Ian Toynton | Stephen Nathan & Jonathan Collier | September 25, 2014 | AAKY01 | 6.34 |
| 192 | 2 | "The Lance to the Heart" | Dwight Little | Teleplay by : Nkechi Okoro Carroll & Keith Foglesong; Story by : Michael Peterson | October 2, 2014 | AAKY02 | 6.41 |
| 193 | 3 | "The Purging of the Pundit" | Tim Southam | Michael Peterson | October 9, 2014 | AAKY03 | 6.39 |
| 194 | 4 | "The Geek in the Guck" | Milan Cheylov | Gene Hong | October 16, 2014 | AAKY04 | 6.56 |
| 195 | 5 | "The Corpse at the Convention" | Chad Lowe | Dave Thomas | October 30, 2014 | AAKY05 | 5.60 |
| 196 | 6 | "The Lost Love in the Foreign Land" | Allison Liddi-Brown | Emily Silver | November 6, 2014 | AAKY06 | 5.64 |
| 197 | 7 | "The Money Maker on the Merry-Go-Round" | Michael Lange | Keith Foglesong | November 13, 2014 | AAKY07 | 5.50 |
| 198 | 8 | "The Puzzler in the Pit" | Chad Lowe | Nkechi Okoro Carroll | November 20, 2014 | AAKY08 | 5.26 |
| 199 | 9 | "The Mutilation of the Master Manipulator" | Tim Southam | Hilary Weisman Graham | December 4, 2014 | AAKY09 | 5.70 |
| 200 | 10 | "The 200th in the 10th" | David Boreanaz | Stephen Nathan | December 11, 2014 | AAKY10 | 5.49 |
| 201 | 11 | "The Psychic in the Soup" | Jeannot Szwarc | Lena D. Waithe | March 26, 2015 | AAKY11 | 5.84 |
| 202 | 12 | "The Teacher in the Books" | Anne Renton | Taylor Martin | April 2, 2015 | AAKY12 | 4.74 |
| 203 | 13 | "The Baker in the Bits" | Michael Lange | Jonathan Collier | April 9, 2015 | AAKY13 | 5.03 |
| 204 | 14 | "The Putter in the Rough" | Milan Cheylov | Dave Thomas | April 16, 2015 | AAKY14 | 4.88 |
| 205 | 15 | "The Eye in the Sky" | Arlene Sanford | Gene Hong | April 23, 2015 | AAKY15 | 4.65 |
| 206 | 16 | "The Big Beef at the Royal Diner" | Alex Chapple | Hilary Weisman Graham | April 30, 2015 | AAKY16 | 4.29 |
| 207 | 17 | "The Lost in the Found" | Jeannot Szwarc | Emily Silver | May 7, 2015 | AAKY17 | 4.49 |
| 208 | 18 | "The Verdict in the Victims" | Michael Lange | Nkechi Okoro Carroll | May 7, 2015 | AAKY18 | 4.49 |
| 209 | 19 | "The Murder in the Middle East" | Milan Cheylov | Michael Peterson | May 14, 2015 | AAKY19 | 4.71 |
| 210 | 20 | "The Woman in the Whirlpool" | Dwight Little | Kathy Reichs & Kerry Reichs | May 28, 2015 | AAKY20 | 5.42 |
| 211 | 21 | "The Life in the Light" | Randy Zisk | Keith Foglesong | June 4, 2015 | AAKY21 | 5.21 |
| 212 | 22 | "The Next in the Last" | Ian Toynton | Stephen Nathan & Jonathan Collier | June 11, 2015 | AAKY22 | 5.11 |

=== Season 11 (2015–16) ===
| No. overall | No. in season | Title | Directed by | Written by | Original release date | Prod. code | US viewers (millions) |
|---|---|---|---|---|---|---|---|
| 213 | 1 | "The Loyalty in the Lie" | Randy Zisk | Jonathan Collier | October 1, 2015 | BAKY01 | 6.20 |
| 214 | 2 | "The Brother in the Basement" | Dwight Little | Michael Peterson | October 8, 2015 | BAKY02 | 5.90 |
| 215 | 3 | "The Donor in the Drink" | Michael Lange | Hilary Weisman Graham | October 15, 2015 | BAKY03 | 5.79 |
| 216 | 4 | "The Carpals in the Coy-Wolves" | Randy Zisk | Gene Hong | October 22, 2015 | BAKY04 | 6.06 |
| 217 | 5 | "The Resurrection in the Remains" | Chad Lowe | Mary Trahan | October 29, 2015 | BAKY05 | 6.57 |
| 218 | 6 | "The Senator in the Street Sweeper" | Steve Robin | Emily Silver | November 5, 2015 | BAKY06 | 5.34 |
| 219 | 7 | "The Promise in the Palace" | Jeannot Szwarc | Joe Hortua | November 12, 2015 | BAKY07 | 5.16 |
| 220 | 8 | "High Treason in the Holiday Season" | Anne Renton | Jon Cowan | November 19, 2015 | BAKY08 | 5.25 |
| 221 | 9 | "The Cowboy in the Contest" | Chad Lowe | Karine Rosenthal | December 10, 2015 | BAKY09 | 4.63 |
| 222 | 10 | "The Doom in the Boom" | Michael Lange | Keith Foglesong | December 10, 2015 | BAKY10 | 4.42 |
| 223 | 11 | "The Death in the Defense" | Arlene Sanford | Kendall Sand | April 14, 2016 | BAKY11 | 4.40 |
| 224 | 12 | "The Murder of the Meninist" | Ian Toynton | Hilary Weisman Graham | April 21, 2016 | BAKY12 | 4.38 |
| 225 | 13 | "The Monster in the Closet" | Randy Zisk | Michael Peterson | April 28, 2016 | BAKY13 | 4.38 |
| 226 | 14 | "The Last Shot at a Second Chance" | David Grossman | Emily Silver | May 5, 2016 | BAKY14 | 4.29 |
| 227 | 15 | "The Fight in the Fixer" | Silver Tree | Joe Hortua | May 12, 2016 | BAKY15 | 4.26 |
| 228 | 16 | "The Strike in the Chord" | Michael Lange | Yael Zinkow | May 19, 2016 | BAKY16 | 4.29 |
| 229 | 17 | "The Secret in the Service" | Dwight Little | Kandall Sand & Mary Trahan | May 26, 2016 | BAKY17 | 4.63 |
| 230 | 18 | "The Movie in the Making" | Randy Zisk | Keith Foglesong | June 2, 2016 | BAKY18 | 4.61 |
| 231 | 19 | "The Head in the Abutment" | Ian Toynton | Gene Hong | June 16, 2016 | BAKY19 | 3.94 |
| 232 | 20 | "The Stiff in the Cliff" | Jeannot Szwarc | Kathy Reichs & Kerry Reichs | June 23, 2016 | BAKY20 | 4.51 |
| 233 | 21 | "The Jewel in the Crown" | David Grossman | Jon Cowan | July 14, 2016 | BAKY21 | 4.36 |
| 234 | 22 | "The Nightmare within the Nightmare" | David Boreanaz | Michael Peterson | July 21, 2016 | BAKY22 | 3.74 |

=== Season 12 (2017) ===
| No. overall | No. in season | Title | Directed by | Written by | Original release date | Prod. code | US viewers (millions) |
|---|---|---|---|---|---|---|---|
| 235 | 1 | "The Hope in the Horror" | Emily Deschanel | Michael Peterson | January 3, 2017 | CAKY01 | 3.43 |
| 236 | 2 | "The Brain in the Bot" | Ian Toynton | Hilary Weisman Graham | January 10, 2017 | CAKY02 | 3.31 |
| 237 | 3 | "The New Tricks in the Old Dogs" | David Grossman | Ted Peterson | January 17, 2017 | CAKY03 | 2.92 |
| 238 | 4 | "The Price for the Past" | Randy Zisk | Jonathan Collier | January 24, 2017 | CAKY04 | 3.05 |
| 239 | 5 | "The Tutor in the Tussle" | Dwight Little | Eric Randall | January 31, 2017 | CAKY05 | 3.76 |
| 240 | 6 | "The Flaw in the Saw" | Denise Di Novi | Yael Zinkow | February 7, 2017 | CAKY06 | 3.07 |
| 241 | 7 | "The Scare in the Score" | Randy Zisk | Joe Hortua | February 14, 2017 | CAKY08 | 2.97 |
| 242 | 8 | "The Grief and the Girl" | Anton Cropper | Karine Rosenthal | February 21, 2017 | CAKY07 | 2.90 |
| 243 | 9 | "The Steal in the Wheels" | Robert Reed Altman | Hilary Weisman Graham & Ted Peterson | March 7, 2017 | CAKY09 | 2.89 |
| 244 | 10 | "The Radioactive Panthers in the Party" | Michael Lange | Keith Foglesong | March 14, 2017 | CAKY10 | 2.52 |
| 245 | 11 | "The Day in the Life" | Ian Toynton | Eric Randall & Yael Zinkow | March 21, 2017 | CAKY11 | 3.55 |
| 246 | 12 | "The End in the End" | David Boreanaz | Teleplay by : Jonathan Collier & Michael Peterson & Karine Rosenthal; Story by : Stephen Nathan | March 28, 2017 | CAKY12 | 4.35 |

== Home media ==
| Season | Episodes | DVD release dates | | | Blu-ray release dates | |
| Season | Episodes | Region 1 | Region 2 | Region 4 | Region A | Region B |
|---|---|---|---|---|---|---|
| 1 | 22 | November 28, 2006 | October 30, 2006 | January 10, 2007 | —N/a | —N/a |
| 2 | 21 | September 11, 2007 | October 15, 2007 | December 3, 2008 | —N/a | —N/a |
| 3 | 15 | November 18, 2008 | November 17, 2008 | March 4, 2009 | —N/a | —N/a |
| 4 | 26 | October 6, 2009 | October 26, 2009 | October 28, 2009 | October 6, 2009 | —N/a |
| 5 | 22 | October 5, 2010 | October 18, 2010 | October 27, 2010 | October 5, 2010 | October 18, 2010 |
| 6 | 23 | October 11, 2011 | October 17, 2011 | November 9, 2011 | October 11, 2011 | October 17, 2011 |
| 7 | 13 | October 9, 2012 | October 1, 2012 | November 7, 2012 | October 9, 2012 | October 1, 2012 |
| 8 | 24 | October 8, 2013 | September 30, 2013 | November 20, 2013 | October 8, 2013 | September 30, 2013 |
| 9 | 24 | September 16, 2014 | September 15, 2014 | November 26, 2014 | —N/a | —N/a |
| 10 | 22 | September 29, 2015 | October 12, 2015 | August 8, 2016 | —N/a | —N/a |
| 11 | 22 | January 3, 2017 | November 7, 2016 | December 7, 2016 | —N/a | —N/a |
| 12 | 12 | June 13, 2017 | June 19, 2017 | June 14, 2017 | —N/a | —N/a |
| The Complete Series | 246 | June 13, 2017 | —N/a | —N/a | —N/a | —N/a |
