= Bones season 1 =

Bones
- Season 1
- Season 1 DVD cover art
- No. of episodes: 22

Release
- Original network: Fox
- Original release: September 13, 2005 – May 17, 2006

Season chronology
- Next → Season 2

The first season of the American television series Bones premiered on September 13, 2005, and concluded on May 17, 2006, on Fox. The season aired on Tuesdays at 8:00 pm ET before moving to Wednesdays at 8:00 pm ET in 2006. The season consisted of 22 episodes and averaged 8.9 million viewers.

== Cast and characters ==
=== Main cast ===
- David Boreanaz as FBI Special Agent Seeley Booth, the official FBI liaison with the Jeffersonian
- Emily Deschanel as Dr. Temperance "Bones" Brennan, a forensic anthropologist
- Michaela Conlin as Angela Montenegro, a forensic artist
- Eric Millegan as Zack Addy, Dr. Brennan's lab assistant
- T. J. Thyne as Dr. Jack Hodgins, an entomologist
- Jonathan Adams as Dr. Daniel Goodman, the director of the Jeffersonian Institute

=== Recurring cast ===
- John M. Jackson as FBI Deputy Director Sam Cullen
- Heavy D as Sid Shapiro, owner of Wong Fu's
- Chris Conner as Oliver Laurier, a fanatic of Bones's books
- Patricia Belcher as Caroline Julian, a prosecutor
- Loren Dean as Russ Brennan, Brennan's brother
- Heath Freeman as Howard Epps, a serial killer
- Billy Gibbons as Angela's father
- Ty Panitz as Parker Booth, Booth's son

== Episodes ==
No. overall	No. in season	Title	Directed by	Written by	Original release date	Prod. code	US viewers (millions)
1	1	"Pilot"	Greg Yaitanes	Hart Hanson	September 13, 2005	1AKY79	10.79
After returning to Washington, D.C., renowned forensic anthropologist Dr. Temperance Brennan is called in by FBI Special Agent Seeley Booth to aid an FBI investigation involving a set of bones found hidden in a lake.
2	2	"The Man in the S.U.V."	Allan Kroeker	Stephen Nathan	September 20, 2005	1AKY02	7.39
An SUV explodes outside a cafe, killing several civilians. When Dr. Brennan confirms the identity of the deceased driver to be the leader of the Arab-American Friendship League, the authorities suspect the man was a terrorist. After discovering the driver was murdered, Booth and Brennan try to find the murderer before he strikes again.
3	3	"A Boy in a Tree"	Patrick Norris	Hart Hanson	September 27, 2005	1AKY01	7.87
A boy is found hanging from a tree at an exclusive private school, apparently having committed suicide. Things quickly become more complicated when the school attempts a cover-up as Dr. Brennan and Booth must untangle a complicated web of sex, scandal and lies.
4	4	"The Man in the Bear"	Allan Kroeker	Laura Wolner	November 1, 2005	1AKY04	7.99
Dr. Brennan reluctantly joins Agent Booth to travel to Aurora, Washington State, where a human hand was found inside the stomach of a bear. As Brennan identifies the man, she discovers he might have been a victim of cannibalism. The investigation hits a roadblock when Booth loses a suspect in the woods, leading him and Dr. Brennan to spend some time in the local bar where Brennan is hit on by every available man in the small town. Booth shares a dance with Brennan to give her a break from all the unwanted attention. Meanwhile, at the lab, Zack and Hodgins compete for the attention of a beautiful package delivery employee.
5	5	"A Boy in a Bush"	Jesús Treviño	Steve Blackman & Greg Ball	November 8, 2005	1AKY05	6.86
A six-year-old boy's remains are found near a shopping mall and when he is confirmed by Dr. Brennan to be the same boy who went missing from a local park, Booth and Brennan's team work together to find his murderer.
6	6	"The Man in the Wall"	Tawnia McKiernan	Elizabeth Benjamin	November 15, 2005	1AKY06	8.84
During a fight at a dance club, a wall breaks open to reveal a mummified corpse and a stash of methamphetamine. When Brennan and her team identify the deceased to be a former DJ of the dance club, Booth and Brennan investigate a rival DJ and the owner of the dance club.
7	7	"A Man on Death Row"	David Jones	Noah Hawley	November 22, 2005	1AKY03	7.25
Howard Epps, a death row inmate, has less than two days left before his execution. When his attorney asks for Booth's help to prove his innocence, Booth agrees to look over the case and asks Brennan and her team to help him, even though he is convinced of Epps' guilt.
8	8	"The Girl in the Fridge"	Sanford Bookstaver	Dana Coen	November 29, 2005	1AKY07	7.64
Brennan's former professor and ex-lover, Michael, arrives at the Jeffersonian just as an investigation into the death of a woman found hidden in a refrigerator begins. Brennan works to gather evidence for the prosecution, only to discover Michael has been appointed expert witness for the defense.
9	9	"The Man in the Fallout Shelter"	Greg Yaitanes	Hart Hanson	December 13, 2005	1AKY08	7.12
Two days before Christmas, Booth brings in the body of a man found in a fallout shelter. While Brennan is eager to examine the body, her colleagues want to go to the company's Christmas party. When Zack cuts into the bones of the man, he accidentally releases a deadly fungus causing the team, including Booth and Dr. Goodman, to be quarantined in the lab over Christmas.
10	10	"The Woman at the Airport"	Greg Yaitanes	Teresa Lin	January 25, 2006	1AKY10	11.37
Brennan and Booth investigate the body parts of a woman found in different locations by Los Angeles International Airport. However, Brennan and her team have trouble identifying the victim when they discover she had extensive cosmetic surgery done, which altered the core architecture of her skull.
11	11	"The Woman in the Car"	Dwight Little	Noah Hawley	February 1, 2006	1AKY09	12.64
An agent from the State Department is sent to perform a security review on Brennan and her team. Meanwhile, the burnt body of a woman is found in a car with signs her child was kidnapped, leading Booth and Brennan to suspect the child's father, Carl Decker. Their investigation is complicated by their discovery that Decker is in the witness protection program.
12	12	"The Superhero in the Alley"	James Whitmore Jr.	Elizabeth Benjamin	February 8, 2006	1AKY12	11.91
A decomposed corpse in a superhero outfit is found in an alley. Booth and Brennan discover the victim was a fan of comic books and had engaged in role playing with his friends. His attempt at being a hero, however, had deadly consequences.
13	13	"The Woman in the Garden"	Sanford Bookstaver	Laura Wolner	February 15, 2006	1AKY13	11.87
Brennan joins Booth in his investigation regarding a dug-up corpse found in the back of a gang member's car. When Brennan and her team examine the original burial site of the corpse, they find another empty grave, leading Booth to believe there was a double homicide. The x-ray results somehow shows that both bodies are related, father and daughter.
14	14	"The Man on the Fairway"	Tony Wharmby	Steve Blackman	March 8, 2006	1AKY14	11.82
Brennan and Zack investigate a small jet crash that was carrying some Chinese diplomats and an unidentified female guest. At the crash site, Brennan finds some bone fragments not belonging to any of the passengers, but might belong to a man missing for five years.
15	15	"Two Bodies in the Lab"	Allan Kroeker	Stephen Nathan	March 15, 2006	1AKY15	12.07
Two cases are brought to the Jeffersonian Institute; one concerning the human remains of a man whom the FBI thinks is mob boss James Cugini, while the other concerns a possible murder victim of serial killer Kevin Hollings, one of Booth's old cold cases. When Brennan narrowly misses being the target of a shooting while waiting for a date, it becomes probable the shooter is connected to one of these cases. When Booth is injured when he opens Brennan's fridge, which had been rigged, the team realize that she was the target. As the investigation continues, Brennan discovers a secret from Booth's past and evidence leads the team to an unlikely suspect.
16	16	"The Woman in the Tunnel"	Joe Napolitano	Greg Ball & Steve Blackman	March 22, 2006	1AKY11	11.14
When the body of a documentary filmmaker is found at the bottom of a tunnel shaft beneath Washington, D.C., Brennan and Booth are introduced to an underground society whose leader thinks he might be responsible for the victim's death.
17	17	"The Skull in the Desert"	Donna Deitch	Jeff Rake	March 29, 2006	1AKY17	11.24
When Angela finds a skull in the New Mexico desert on her vacation, she asks Brennan for help identifying the skull as she fears it may be that of her missing boyfriend. Brennan calls Booth out for assistance and the three of them discover that there is more to the case than meets the eye. Back at the Jeffersonian, Hodgins and Zack have a rivalry going on.
18	18	"The Man with the Bone"	Jesús Treviño	Craig Silverstein	April 5, 2006	1AKY16	10.14
Booth brings Brennan to examine a 300-year-old finger bone found with a corpse in a national park. When they discover the bone may have belonged to a pirate, the team is led on a hunt for pirate treasure at Assateague Island.
19	19	"The Man in the Morgue"	James Whitmore Jr.	Noah Hawley & Elizabeth Benjamin	April 19, 2006	1AKY18	10.28
Brennan is on vacation in New Orleans identifying bodies of Hurricane Katrina victims. When she suddenly wakes up badly beaten and realizes she has lost her memory of the previous day, Booth flies down to help her. She soon becomes the prime suspect in a murder case. Booth risks his career to keep Brennan from being implicated any further when he finds evidence linking her to the crime scene. The investigation leads the team to look into voodoo rituals.
20	20	"The Graft in the Girl"	Sanford Bookstaver	Laura Wolner & Greg Ball	April 26, 2006	1AKY19	10.33
The team helps FBI Deputy Director Sam Cullen's daughter, Amy, when she contracts a rare form of lung cancer after receiving a bone graft. Brennan suspects foul play and Booth calls an investigation after discovering that the tissue bank which Amy's graft came from does not exist and that several recipients from the same tissue bank have since died.
21	21	"The Soldier on the Grave"	Jonathan Pontell	Stephen Nathan	May 10, 2006	1AKY20	9.50
A charred body found at a military cemetery leads to the team investigating a possible cover-up involving a group of soldiers in the Iraq War. Bones is worried that Booth, a veteran himself, is becoming emotionally affected while Booth is forced to relive some unpleasant memories from his time in the army.
22	22	"The Woman in Limbo"	Jesús Treviño	Hart Hanson	May 17, 2006	1AKY21	9.07
Booth opens an investigation into the disappearance of Dr. Brennan's parents when her mother's remains are discovered. Brennan reunites with her brother, Russ, whom Booth brings to Washington, D.C., to help in the investigation. The squint team reveals that Brennan's mother died two years after abandoning her and her brother, while Angela helps Russ to remember the identity of a possible suspect, Vince McVickers. The episode ends with Booth, Brennan and Russ sharing drinks in her apartment when Brennan's answering machine reveals a recorded message from her estranged father, Max.

== Reception ==
On Rotten Tomatoes, the season has an approval score of 69%, with an average rating of 7.1/10 and based on 16 reviews. The website's critical consensus reads: "Despite the reliable presence of Emily Deschanel and David Boreanaz, Bones is a so-so police procedural that does little to capitalize on its novel premise."

== DVD release ==
The first season of Bones was released on DVD in region 1 on November 28, 2006, in region 2 on October 30, 2006 and in region 4 on January 11, 2007. The set includes all 22 episodes of season one on a 4-dual side disc set in region 1 and a 6-disc set in regions 2 and 4, presented in anamorphic widescreen. Special features include two audio commentaries—"Pilot" by executive producer Barry Josephson and series creator Hart Hanson and "Two Bodies in the Lab" by actors David Boreanaz and Emily Deschanel. Featurettes include "Bones – Inspired By the Life of Forensic Anthropologist Kathy Reichs", "Squints", "The Real Definition", and "Character Profiles". A featurette titled "Will the Real Kathy Reichs Please Step Forward" is exclusive to the region 2 release.
