= The Woman in the Car =

- Bones episode
- Episode no.: Season 1 Episode 11
- Directed by: Dwight H. Little
- Written by: Noah Hawley
- Production code: 1AKY09
- Original air date: February 1, 2006

Guest appearances
- John M. Jackson as Sam Cullen; Suzanne Cryer as Agent Pickering; Marc Jablon as Asst. U.S. Attorney Weeks; Jake Cherry as Donovan Decker; Željko Ivanek as Carl Decker; Anna Shemeikka as Polina Decker; Lawrence Pressman as Trent Seward; Jaime Ray Newman as Stacy Goodyear; Sarah Ann Schultz as Maria Semov; Alexa Fischer as Sharon Pomeroy

Episode chronology
← Previous "The Woman at the Airport"	Next → "The Superhero in the Alley"

"The Woman in the Car" is the 11th episode of the first season of the television series, Bones. Originally aired on February 1, 2006, on Fox network, the episode is written by Noah Hawley and directed by Dwight H. Little. The episode features FBI Special Agent Seeley Booth and Dr. Temperance Brennan's investigation into a woman whose remains were found inside a car, where a possible kidnapping may have occurred.

== Summary ==
Special Agent Seeley Booth enters Dr. Temperance Brennan's office and waits as she awkwardly answers questions about her new book, Bred in the Bone, in a television interview on Wake Up, DC!. After the interview ends, Booth quickly takes her to the crime scene where a car and its driver were found extensively burnt, with signs of a child kidnapping. They retrieve the body to the Jeffersonian Institute where they determine the remains belong to an Eastern European female, who is also a mother.

As they examine the evidence, the team is interrupted by the arrival of Agent Samantha Pickering from the State Department, who has been assigned to conduct a security review on the team. By reconstructing the facial features of the victim, forensic artist Angela Montenegro is able to identify the victim. The victim's name is Paulina Rozalina Semov. She has an eight-year-old son, Donovan, with her husband Carl Decker, who she is currently separated from. Booth suspects Carl to be the kidnapper. However, Booth and Brennan discover that Carl is under a Federal witness protection program and is scheduled to testify in two days against KBC Systems, a company he believes is responsible for the deaths of 30 soldiers by knowingly sending defective armor to Iraq. The Justice Department informs them that they have not told Carl about his wife and son lest he decides not to testify.

Booth finds out Carl's secret meetings at a motel were the cause of the separation between Carl and his wife. The meetings were with Assistant U.S. Attorney Ken Weeks, assigned to Decker's case against KBC Systems. Weeks tells Booth that Carl disappeared after he was not allowed to talk with his son. Booth and Brennan find Carl at KBC Systems, pointing a gun to the CEO's head, accusing him of the kidnapping. Carl reluctantly surrenders at Brennan and Booth's urging.

Brennan and her assistant, Zack Addy, determine the victim was burnt post mortem and the cause of death was electrocution, which Zack later figures out the current used was consistent with the current provided by a generator. When Agent Pickering asked Brennan about a classified information when she was in Cuba, she made a phone call about it. Handing the phone to Pickering, the person on the other line tells Pickering the review is suspended and wait where she is so someone can come to destroy her notes. From the ear wax in the ear that Zack had found earlier in the victim's throat, Dr. Jack Hodgins is able to determine the origins of the kidnapper to be South African. Booth remarks that companies use South African mercenaries.

The kidnappers threaten Booth by sending him Donovan's finger. From the finger, Brennan is able to ascertain that the boy is alive and her team is able to pinpoint the location the boy is being held, which is an abandoned gas station or mechanic shop. Booth and the SWAT team find the abandoned gas station, kill the kidnappers and save Donovan.

This episode also marks Booth's 48th and 49th kills.

== Conception ==
According to the writer of the episode, Noah Hawley, the main idea of the episode was that the characters get to save a person's life by using their skills whereas in most of the series' episodes, after they find a body, it is followed by an investigation on the victim. Hawley also "wanted to raise [Booth's] stakes in this case and then give him the chance to take some real action - to save a boy's life not just based on his expertise as an investigator, a sniper, but also as a father." The security review conducted on the characters in the episode was used to explore "each person's quirks and create possible scenarios that played against who we think they are. But however far the dismantling of our team went, it was satisfying to show our heroine Bones, remains somehow, untouchable."

== Response ==
On its original airdate, "The Woman in the Car" received 12.61 million viewers with American Idol as the lead-in program, which attracted 30.15 million viewers. Although the episode was ranked first among 18 to 49-year-old viewers, it was placed second in total viewers in its Wednesday 9:00 pm ET timeslot with 8.7% household rating and 13% household share behind a repeat episode of ABC's Lost.
