= Secte Rouge =

Secret society in Haiti

The Secte Rouge, also called the Cochon Gris or the Vinbrindingue, is or was a secret society in Haiti, which Zora Neale Hurston described in her 1938 book Tell My Horse. Hurston's sources of information were lore related by Haitians, as well as a few earlier books.

== Overview ==
She described them as a fearsome group of cannibals who performed rites distinct from vodoo practiced by many Haitians. According to Hurston, Secte Rouge used counterfeit vodou ceremonies to hide their presence. Moreover, Hurston claim many of the practices abhorred by outsiders and attributed to vodou were actually committed by Secte Rouge (e.g., the robbery or desecration of graves). Hurston provided descriptions of Secte Rouge ceremonies to the gods Maitre Carrefour (Lord of the Cross Roads) and Baron Cimetière, a deity involved with graveyards.

The Secte Rouge was held to have originated among slaves captured in the Mondongue region, now part of the Central African Republic, said to have practiced cannibalism in their homeland. Their behavior was held in check by slavery during the 1700s when France ruled the island, but with the Haitian Revolution and independence in 1804 the Secte Rouge were unleashed. The tenure of President Fabre Geffrard (1859-1867) was said to have been the peak years of the Secte Rouge. Anecdotes include stories of a midwife near who murdered newborn infants specifically to consume their flesh, and human fingernails being discovered in food sold as pig's feet.

Hurston relates a conversation with an unidentified "high official of the Guarde d'Haiti" who said that police keep suspected Secte Rouge members under surveillance, hoping to gather evidence or observe criminal activity. The Secte Rouge members kept a strict code of secrecy.

Two earlier works are cited as containing references to the Secte Rouge: Description topographique, physique, civile, politique et historique de la partie francaise de l'isle Saint-Domingue (Tome Premier) (1796) by Médéric Louis Élie Moreau de Saint-Méry and Life in a Haitian Valley (1937) by Melville J. Herskovits.

== In popular culture ==
In "The Man in the Morgue", episode 19 of the first season of the TV show Bones, Secte Rouge is portrayed as a group of vodou sorcerers who unbalance the world and seek to do evil.

The group appears in the Doctor Who spinoff novel White Darkness. In an episode of the CBS Radio Mystery Theater, titled “The House Of The Voodoo Queen” the Cochon Gris are mentioned as wanting to regain possession of a house recently inherited by a couple.
