= A Man on Death Row =

- Bones episode
- Episode no.: Season 1 Episode 7
- Directed by: David Jones
- Written by: Noah Hawley
- Production code: 1AKY03
- Original air date: November 22, 2005

Guest appearances
- Rachelle Lefevre as Amy Morton; Heath Freeman as Howard Epps; John M. Jackson as Sam Cullen; Michael Rothhaar as Judge Cohen; Jeffrey Nordling as David Ross

Episode chronology
← Previous "The Man in the Wall"	Next → "The Girl in the Fridge"

"A Man on Death Row" is the seventh episode of the first season of the television series, Bones. Originally aired on November 22, 2005, on FOX network, the episode is written by Noah Hawley and directed by David Jones. The plot focuses on Dr. Temperance Brennan and FBI Special Agent Seeley Booth's investigation into a seven-year-old murder, of which death-row prisoner Howard Epps is accused. Booth and Brennan are given a deadline to prove Epps' innocence or guilt before his imminent execution.

== Summary ==
The episode opens with Dr. Temperance Brennan and Special Agent Seeley Booth arguing about Booth's refusal to approve Brennan's application to be allowed to carry a concealed weapon as she was formerly charged with a felony (despite not being convicted). In Booth's office, they meet Amy Morton, who tells Booth she is the new lawyer of Howard Epps, an inmate on death row. Morton asks for Booth's help to prove the innocence of Epps, who is scheduled to be executed in 30 hours. Booth was the investigating officer in the murder case of April Wright, whom Epps is accused of killing.

After visiting Epps in prison, Booth is unconvinced of Epps's innocence but asks Brennan to look over the case as a personal favor. With the help of Dr. Jack Hodgins and her assistant Zack Addy, Brennan examines the evidence of the case. They soon find incongruities in the evidence presented by the prosecution.

After being sent by Brennan to photograph the surrounding area of the crime scene, Zack suddenly realizes the significance of the numbers that were found with the victim. They appeared to be a phone number but they actually correlated to the time and place of a meeting the victim had on the night of her murder. Hodgins determines the victim may have been moved from the crime scene before she was deposited at the place where she was found. Brennan declares that they need to exhume the body to determine where the victim was killed. Meanwhile, Booth visits the victim's family and their lawyer, David Ross, whom Booth finds suspicious.

Based on the new evidence found from the exhumed body, the team is able to locate the original crime scene. In addition with a visual confirmation of the pubic hair to be of David Ross, the team begin to have doubts about the guilt of the inmate. However, the judge rules that the evidence is insufficient to postpone the execution.

Booth interrogates Ross, who claims that the victim had run away after they had engaged in sexual intercourse and that he had waited for her to return for two hours before leaving the parking lot. After FBI Deputy Director Samuel Cullen agrees to grant the resources Booth and Brennan need to find the evidence they need from the marsh, they discover more bodies in the marsh, which convinces Booth that they had the right guy all along. Epps was the killer and he had manipulated his defense lawyer, Booth and Brennan to discover the remains of his other victims to prolong his life as the authorities must now open investigations into these victims.

Amy, Booth and Brennan visit Epps at the prison. All three are disgusted when Epps smugly thanks them. After Epps hints that he may live long enough to see the death penalty be abolished, Amy becomes upset and leaves. When Epps reaches for Brennan's hand, she grabs his hand and slams it against the table, breaking his wrist. Brennan and Booth are resigned to the fact that it is their job to find the truth and the rest is up to others.

== Production details ==
The episode was written and filmed as the series' fourth episode but was aired as the seventh. According to Noah Hawley, the writer of the episode, "The image of the man on death row has become something of a cultural cliché." It provided the writers a "rich territory for drama" and showed what Brennan and the scientists would do if they had the opportunity to save a life. The episode was filmed in a decommissioned women's prison.
