= The Man in the S.U.V. =

- Bones episode
- Episode no.: Season 1 Episode 2
- Directed by: Allan Kroeker
- Written by: Stephen Nathan
- Production code: 1AKY02
- Original air date: September 20, 2005

Guest appearances
- José Zúñiga as Mickey Santana; Nicholas Massouh as Farid Masruk; Bahar Soomekh as Sahar Masruk; Federico Dordei as Ali Ladjavardi; Said Faraj as Hamid Masruk; Anne Dudek as Tessa Jankow

Episode chronology
← Previous "Pilot"	Next → "A Boy in a Tree"

"The Man in the S.U.V." is the second episode of the first season of the television series Bones. Originally aired on September 20, 2005 on Fox, the episode is written by Stephen Nathan and directed by Allan Kroeker. The plot features the investigation of Dr. Temperance Brennan and FBI Special Agent Seeley Booth into a man whose S.U.V. exploded, killing him and several other civilians, and highlights issues about terrorism.

== Summary ==
After an S.U.V. explodes in front of a busy café in Washington, D.C., forensic anthropologist Dr. Temperance Brennan is asked to confirm the identity of the SUV's driver as Hamid Masruk, the leader of the Arab-American Friendship League. With the help of her assistant, Zack Addy, Brennan cleans the skeleton and compares the bones to Masruk's medical records.

Although she is convinced the victim is Hamid Masruk, Brennan sends Zack to reconstruct the skull. Zack finds that the ethmoid and sphenoid fragments do not fit together, which Brennan suspects is due to a degenerative disease.

However, it is not from Paget's disease or Lupus as she had first suspected but from gypsum, an environmental contaminant which Zack and Dr. Jack Hodgins found. They determine that the gypsum found was probably used to insulate the bomb that had exploded. After Brennan finds microscopic fissures in the trabecular pattern of Hamid's skull, Hodgins is able to find the cause - Hamid was exposed to dioxins.

Hamid's wife, Sahar, vehemently states that her husband is not a terrorist. Booth suspects that the wife is having an affair, to which Brennan disagrees while her friend, Angela Montenegro, agrees with Booth. Booth finds out the man with whom Sahar was having an affair is Ali Ladjavardi, but he could not have killed Hamid since he was training with Homeland Security during the time when Hamid would have been exposed to the dioxin.

Hodgins and Zack are able to tie the gypsum they found to a type of plaster used in pyrobar, a gypsum-based, fire-proof tile developed in 1903, leading to Booth and Brennan being able to discover where the tile was used and the bomb was built. They realize the home of Hamid's brother, Farid Masruk, is located in that area. However, when they arrive at his house, they find him missing but the insulation used for the explosives is in plain sight. Farid had planned another attack but fails to set off the bomb when Booth and Brennan arrive just in time to stop him.

== Music ==
The episode featured the following tracks: -

- I Turn My Camera On - Spoon
- Every ship must sail away - Blue Merle
- Shalom - Moonraker
- Try - Deep Audio

== Production details ==
This episode was written and filmed after "A Boy in a Tree", which was aired as the series' third episode. According to Stephan Nathan, executive producer and writer of Bones, the episode's main focus is misdirection. The opening scene featuring a Middle Eastern man driving an SUV, which stops in front of a busy café and explodes, is used to cause the audience to assume that the man was a terrorist. The story is one that resembles many real-world situations faced by the authorities in the war on terrorism. The climactic scene was filmed in University Hall on the campus of Loyola Marymount University in Los Angeles, California.

== Response ==
On its original air date in the Tuesday 8:00 pm ET time slot, the series' second episode attracted 7.27 million viewers with 5.7% household rating and 9% household share, and 3.0% household rating and 8% household share among 18 to 49 years old viewers. In total viewers, there was a decrease of 33% from the first episode's 10.79 million. This was a considerable reduction in viewers compared to an average decrease of 10% to 15% for a new series in its second week.
