= The Man in the Morgue =

- Bones episode
- Episode no.: Season 1 Episode 19
- Directed by: James Whitmore, Jr.
- Written by: Noah Hawley; Elizabeth Benjamin
- Production code: 1AKY18
- Original air date: April 19, 2006

Guest appearances
- Patricia Belcher as Caroline Julian; Colby Donaldson as Dr. Graham Leger; Giancarlo Esposito as Richard Benoit; Michelle Hurd as Det. Rose Harding; Scott Lawrence as Sam Potter; Kevin Rankin as Mike Doyle; Victor Togunde as James Embry; Noel True as Eva Benoit; Judd Trichter as Dr. Ryan Halloway; Tom McCleister as Peter Lasalle

Episode chronology
← Previous "The Man with the Bone"	Next → "The Graft in the Girl"

"The Man in the Morgue" is the 19th episode of the first season of the television series Bones. Originally aired on April 19, 2006 on FOX network, the episode is written by Noah Hawley and Elizabeth Benjamin, and directed by James Whitmore Jr. The episode features Dr. Temperance Brennan and FBI Special Agent Seeley Booth attempting to recover Brennan's memories after she awakes covered in blood in New Orleans.

== Summary ==
The episode opens with Dr. Brennan in New Orleans, where she is taking her vacation time to help identify victims of Hurricane Katrina some time after the event with the help of Mike Doyle and Dr. Graham Legiere inside a temporary morgue set up within a church. Brennan begins to autopsy 'John Doe 361' who was found covered in mud with a small hole in the front of his skull. Detective Rose Harding and Dr. James Embry assist Brennan, hoping to discover whether the death was the result of the hurricane or foul play. James discovers something lodged in the victim's mouth and Brennan sends an orderly, Sam Potter, to X-ray John Doe 361. Following this, Graham Legiere asks Brennan out on a date, which she says she will consider once she receives the results of the X-rays.

There is a flash on screen, and Brennan is seen lying on a bathroom floor soaked in blood, blood on her hands, and a gash on her forehead. She is disoriented as she tries to remember what happened but is only able to recover flashes. Brennan answers a phone call from the hotel clerk, who tells her that the bus to the airport is waiting. Having been told it was Thursday, Brennan is confused and wonders what happened to Wednesday.

At the hospital, Dr. Ryan Halloway notes that one of Brennan's ears has been ripped open and her mother's earring taken, yet Brennan still has no memory of such an event occurring. While Dr. Halloway sends off the blood samples on Brennan's clothes for analysis, Detective Harding arrives to interview Brennan. The only memory she has is of Dr. Legiere asking her on a date. Booth arrives and takes Brennan to a restaurant. They discuss the last thing she remembers - her pending date with Legiere. After finding out from the restaurant owner, Peter LaSalle, that Brennan was at his restaurant on Tuesday night with Sam Potter, an orderly at the makeshift morgue who practices voodoo, they head to the morgue.

Meanwhile, back at the lab, Angela Montenegro delivers the X-rays of John Doe 361 to Zack Addy so he can make an analysis of them. He calls Brennan and tells her that John Doe 361, who she does not recall, was 40 years old, of mixed race and was murdered.

At the morgue, Sam informs Brennan that they had spoken on Tuesday night about the object lodged in 361's mouth, which was voodoo in origin. Sam explains that voodoo is all about balance and that the hurricane, brought on by Secte Rouge, has destroyed the balance of New Orleans. He states that the objects found in the victim's mouth, black gum root and a chicken foot, can only be found at a voodoo shop, which is run by a man called Richard Benoit.

At Benoit's shop, Booth shows Benoit the evidence found in the victim's mouth and Benoit informs him that it would be the work of Secte Rouge, as it is part of an evil spell. Upon looking at the list of those who had recently purchased the objects, Brennan noticed one name in particular: Dr. Graham Legiere. Booth and Brennan head to Legiere's home, where they find him crucified to a wall three feet off the ground with a mojo bag around his neck. The police soon arrive, and a doubtful Detective Harding interviews Brennan and Booth. As Brennan explains, Booth notices Brennan's missing earring underneath a table and pockets it without informing anyone.

At the morgue, Brennan discovers that John Doe 361's file is missing. Back at Brennan's hotel room, Booth notices a mojo bag on Brennan's bed full of sea shells, flesh, a strip of leather and a human tooth. At that moment, Harding bursts in and arrests Brennan, having found her blood at Legiere's house. Brennan goes quietly and, despite Booth's protests, reveals incriminating evidence about herself.

At the police station, Brennan is interrogated by Detective Harding, before Booth and attorney Caroline Julian enter to shut Brennan up before she convicts herself. Detective Harding leaves after Caroline informs her that Brennan will not be saying anything else. Sam Potter tells Booth and Brennan that the mojo bags are being left with Brennan to prolong her amnesia. They then find out that according to the results of the toxicology screen, Brennan had not been drugged.

Zack calls Brennan with John Doe 361's real identity, and inform her that he was called Rene Mouton, who was the head of a voodoo church and had offered aid during Katrina but then disappeared. Sam Potter suggests that this is the work of a sorcerer from Secte Rouge, and Brennan agrees while Booth is disbelieving. They go to the cooler, where they find the freshly killed body of Mike Doyle, with the body of Rene Mouton. Brennan suspects Mike Doyle's girlfriend for his murder, and Sam Potter scatters ashes across the body of Mouton, revealing an electrostatic charge, as some ashes stuck to the corpse more than others, revealing an emblem of a Cadillac Brougham, the car belonging to Richard Benoit. This instantly makes Brennan suspect his daughter, Eva, as the girlfriend, and thus the killer.

At Benoit's shop, they confront him, who leads them downstairs to their basement, where Eva was hiding. In the basement, they find Eva dead, her body thrown onto a large spike fixed on the wall. Brennan and Booth search the room and find Mouton's skull and the spike used on Mouton and Mike Doyle. Sam tells Brennan that the basement was the place of a dark sorcerer and that the spike on the wall was usually used for animal sacrifices. Brennan suddenly comes to the conclusion that it would be impossible for Eva to kill herself, as the room was only 12 feet wide, and she could not have been running fast enough to stab herself the way the body was.

Sam Potter accuses Richard Benoit of being the sorcerer and killer claiming that he killed his daughter so they would stop looking for the killer of Mouton. Brennan knows there must have been a struggle with him throwing Eva on the spike and tears Benoit's shirts open to reveal a freshly bandaged injury. Detective Harding arrests Benoit.

Back in D.C. Brennan and Booth tell Angela, Zack, and Hodgins about their case in New Orleans. They debate whether voodoo is real. Brennan is adamant that it’s not, but can’t explain her amnesia, or why her blood tests didn’t reveal that she was drugged. Booth brings up the mojo bag. Brennan declares that objects carry no intrinsic power, and that things are just things. Booth reveals Brennan’s lost earring that he picked up at Leger’s house. Brennan stands corrected.

== Music ==
The episode featured the following music: -

- Tipitina - Bo Dollis & The Wild Magnolias
- No Scratch Blues - Zydeco All Stars
- Tee Nah Nah - Buckwheat Zydeco

== Response ==
Aired in the Wednesday 8:00 pm ET timeslot, directly following the broadcast of American Idol, the episode "The Man in the Morgue" received a 6.6% household rating and 11% household share on its original airdate, which allowed the Fox Network to finish first in its timeslot.
