= The Man in the Wall =

- Bones episode
- Episode no.: Season 1 Episode 6
- Directed by: Tawnia McKiernan
- Written by: Elizabeth Benjamin
- Production code: 1AKY06
- Original air date: November 15, 2005

Guest appearances
- Charles Duckworth as Rulz; Bokeem Woodbine as Randall Hall; Kathy Byron as Maggie Magregor; Robert Gossett as Mr. Taylor; Morris Chestnut as Agent Oakes; Anne Dudek as Tessa Jankow; Rachelle Lefevre as Amy Morton

Episode chronology
← Previous "A Boy in a Bush"	Next → "A Man on Death Row"

"The Man in the Wall" is the sixth episode of the first season of the television series Bones. Originally aired on November 15, 2005, on FOX network, the episode is written by Elizabeth Benjamin and directed by Tawnia McKiernan. The plot features FBI Special Agent Seeley Booth and Dr. Temperance Brennan's investigation into a mummified man found inside a wall in a nightclub.

== Summary ==
Angela Montenegro persuades her best friend, Dr. Temperance Brennan, to stop working and go to a club with her. At the club, Brennan inadvertently starts a fight by describing the music as "tribal." She kicks a man, who falls against a wall and breaks it, revealing a hidden mummy and dispersing a cloud of methamphetamine onto the dance floor which doses Angela and Brennan as well.

The man turns out to be Roy Taylor or more popularly known as D.J. Mount, a rising disc jockey at the nightclub. Inside the wall of the club, Brennan and her assistant, Zack Addy, discover a belly button ring with the words "Luv Rulz" engraved on it, making a fellow disc jockey, D.J. Rulz, a prime suspect. The stud came from D.J. Mount's girlfriend, who was D.J. Rulz's ex-girlfriend.

When Booth and Brennan go to find Mount's girlfriend, Eve, they discover from her brother that Eve had left her daughter with him and although she had promised to return, she never did. They discover that the methamphetamine found on the money she left her brother is the same as the methamphetamine on Mount's face. She becomes a suspect until they realize she had been behind Mount at the time Mount was stuck in the wall where he was mummified, and the methamphetamine was pushed into his face from the front, indicating that there was a third person in the wall.

They discover an FBI agent is working undercover for Randall Hall, the owner of the club. The agent claims that Randall is passing methamphetamine through the club. They confront Hall, who tells them that Rulz built himself a new studio a day after Mount went missing. They find Eve's body using a police cadaver dog, but Rulz did not have the strength to kill her, as he was shot through the wrist a few years ago. They find a bone dimple on both bodies, but cannot explain it.

They take Rulz in, and he tells them that Mount was going to jump labels from Randall Hall's Basement Records, and that Randall paid for his studio. From this they have Randall's motive: Mount was going to jump labels and Eve was stealing his methamphetamine and cash to pay for them to have a better life.

Booth goes to the club and gets Randall to poke him with his cane, and almost breaks it before Brennan realizes that his cane is what caused the bone dimples on both bodies. This is confirmed when a test in the lab show the cane created them both. The team now have forensics that confirm he is the killer.

== Music ==
The episode features the following music: -

- Rize - Flii Stylz
- Soul Survivor - Young Jeezy featuring Akon
- Run It! - Chris Brown
- Something - Cary Brothers
- Gunpowder Language - Move.meant

== Conception ==
The idea of the episode was based on the real-life story of disc jockey Eduardo Sanchez, who was reported missing before his mummified body was found inside a wall of a popular night club in Winnipeg, Manitoba, Canada. The story of "DJ's mummified body found behind wall in club" was published by the National Post on December 7, 2003. According to the episode's writer, Elizabeth Benjamin, the story also allowed her to "put Brennan inside a world that is completely outside her comfort zone, and allow her not to only relate to it and find parallels in her own life, but to see her actually enjoying herself and finding it cool."
