= The Man in the Bear =

- Bones episode
- Episode no.: Season 1 Episode 4
- Directed by: Allan Kroeker
- Written by: Laura Wolner
- Production code: 1AKY04
- Original air date: November 1, 2005

Guest appearances
- Alex Carter as Dr. Andrew Rigby; Marguerite MacIntyre as Dr. Denise Randall; Steve Reevis as Sherman Rivers; Rusty Joiner as Charlie; Tom Kiesche as Sheriff Chris Scutter

Episode chronology
| ← Previous "A Boy in a Tree" | Next → "A Boy in a Bush" |

"The Man in the Bear" is the fourth episode of the first season of the television series Bones. Originally aired on November 1, 2005, on FOX network, the episode is written by Laura Wolner and directed by Allan Kroeker. The plot features FBI Special Agent Seeley Booth and Dr. Temperance Brennan's investigation concerning a human hand that was found inside a bear in Washington state.

== Summary ==
To Brennan's dismay, Booth takes her, with Dr. Goodman's permission, to small town Aurora, Washington, to identify the victim whose arm was found inside a black bear. From a photograph taken of the arm, Brennan sees that the victim had his arm cut off by a saw before the bear ate it.

Once there, Booth and Brennan meet with the sheriff and the local doctors. The victim is a young male but only one person has been reported missing — a woman by the name of Ann Noyes. Brennan sends the bone fragments back to the Jeffersonian, where her assistant, Zack Addy, debrides them and finds indentations belonging to bite marks from a human — Brennan realizes the killer is a cannibal. Since a cannibal would get sick with prion disease, Brennan visits local coroner Dr. Andrew Rigby to ask him if he has met with any patients with such symptoms. He says that he has not.

Back at the lab, Dr. Jack Hodgins examines the bear scat Brennan had sent to him and finds a flap of skin with a tattoo, which turns out to be a Haida Sun motif, when recreated by Angela Montenegro. From the tattoo, the sheriff is able to find the victim's identity via a missing persons check. The victim is Adam Langer, and according to the sheriff, he used to come up to Aurora to visit Sherman Rivers, the town's Native American Park Ranger. However, when Booth and Brennan go to question Rivers, he escapes into the woods.

They find Rivers the next morning in the woods. From the evidence Booth and Brennan gathered from Rivers' house, they are convinced that he is a poacher but not the cannibal. With Hodgins' expertise and Rivers' help, they find the crime scene in the woods, where they also find a perverse version of a medicine wheel and two dead bodies belonging to Adam Langer and Ann Noyes, whose heart has been removed.

Based on adipocere formation, Brennan estimates Ann Noyes has been dead for about a week. When it is revealed that Adam Langer was seeing local veterinarian Dr. Denise Randall, Booth and Brennan corner her at a local bar, where they get her to bite into a block of dental medium so they can check her teeth marks. However, Brennan points out that Randall had no motives for killing Ann Noyes and that they are more likely looking for someone who is clinically insane. Meanwhile, Zack finds more marks on Ann Noyes's sternum, which Brennan determines to be made by a sternum spreader. She realizes that Dr. Rigby would have seen this beforehand but did not mention it because he is the cannibal. Booth and Brennan find Rigby in the process of cremating the bodies; Brennan knocks Rigby out with a bedpan.

During the episode, Hodgins and Zack vie for the attention of the parcel delivery person, played by K. D. Aubert, who later turns out to be bisexual, choosing Angela over Hodgins and Zack.

== Music ==
The episode featured the following music:

- Mike Doughty – "Looking at the World from the Bottom of a Well"
- Peter Himmelman – "Big Me"

== Production details ==
The episode was written as the series' fifth episode but broadcast as the fourth. According to Laura Wolner, writer of the episode, the idea for the episode came from her interest in cannibalism and that it would be fascinating to see "teeth marks on bones that turned out not to be from an animal, but from a human". Also by having a different setting, the character of Temperance Brennan could be explored further.

== Response ==
As a lead-in program for House, Bones attracted 7.99 million viewers in its Tuesday 8:00 pm ET timeslot on the episode's original airdate, ranking third in total viewers in its timeslot.
