= A Boy in a Bush =

- Bones episode
- Episode no.: Season 1 Episode 5
- Directed by: Jesús Salvador Treviño
- Written by: Steve Blackman; Greg Ball
- Production code: 1AKY05
- Original air date: November 8, 2005

Guest appearances
- Paul Butcher as Shawn Cook; Evan Ellingson as David Cook; Natacha Roi as Margaret Sanders; Maximillian Roeg as Skyler Nelson

Episode chronology
← Previous "The Man in the Bear"	Next → "The Man in the Wall"

"A Boy in a Bush" is the fifth episode of the first season of the television series, Bones. Originally aired on November 8, 2005. on FOX network, the episode is written by Steve Blackman and Greg Ball and directed by Jesús Salvador Treviño. The episode features FBI Special Agent Seeley Booth and Dr. Temperance Brennan's investigation into the death of a six-year-old boy, whose remains were found near a shopping mall.

== Summary ==
Special Agent Seeley Booth shows up at Dr. Temperance Brennan's lecture at American University. He tells her someone has found human remains in an adjacent field of a local mall, where six-year-old Charlie Sanders was believed to have gone missing. Booth needs Brennan's help to locate the remains and then determine if they are in fact those of their missing six-year-old.

Brennan, Booth, and Zack head to the field, where they find a small, decomposed body. Back in the lab at the Jeffersonian, Brennan, Zack, Angela Montenegro and Dr. Jack Hodgins determine that the body does belong to Charlie Sanders and they are probably looking for a pedophile.

Booth visits Charlie's mother, Margaret Sanders, and learns that Margaret has two other foster sons, Shawn and David Cook, but Charlie was her only biological child. As he leaves, Booth finds out that Charlie disappeared from the local mall and not the nearby park.

Brennan confronts Angela and asks her if she is considering leaving the Jeffersonian. Angela confides to her that this job is difficult for her and she is not sure what she is going to do. Zack is also having trouble working on such "small" remains so Brennan advises him to pull back emotionally from the case. When Brennan finds a hereditary genetic defect on Charlie's bones, Booth and Brennan confront Margaret with this information and learn that she is not Charlie's biological mother as she claimed.

Margaret tells them she took Charlie to save him from the foster care system after his mother died of a drug overdose, but did not have anything to do with his abduction and death. Brennan becomes angry at Booth when she learns he arrested Margaret for kidnapping, but Booth claims he had no choice. She wants Booth to let Margaret go so she, Shawn and David can continue to be a family but Booth remains resistant.

As Angela works on isolating the image of Charlie's abductor in the surveillance footage, she learns from Zack that Hodgins is extremely wealthy; his family runs the organization that is the single biggest donor to the Jeffersonian. Hodgins pleads to Booth and Angela to keep his family background a secret. He explains that he does not want to go to the banquet the team has been invited to because he will be outed by his family's rich friends and his life at the Jeffersonian will be forever changed.

Angela's isolated reflection of Charlie's abductor turns out to be his foster brother, Shawn. However, he was not the killer. By drawing upon her own experience as a child in the foster system, Brennan convinces Shawn to tell her the name of Charlie's killer. It was Edward Nelson, their neighbor. Booth arrests him for Charlie's sexual assault and murder, and arranges for Shawn and David to be returned to Margaret.

As they prepare to leave for the banquet, Dr. Goodman notes Angela's distress over her job and comforts her by telling her that she gives the victims back their faces and identities, not "death masks".

== Conception ==
The idea for the episode was conceived to explore the reaction of the various characters to the death of a child, in particular, Dr. Brennan's team of scientists working at the Jeffersonian, who are used to working with decomposed bodies and human bones. The writers, Steve Blackman and Greg Ball, established Brennan's background as a foster child to "ratchet up her emotional stakes and allow us to see her more vulnerable than ever before."

== Music ==
The episode featured the song Some of Us by Starsailor.

== Response ==
On the night of its original airdate, the episode attracted 6.85 million viewers with 5.5% household rating and 8% household share.
