= Pilot (Bones) =

- Bones episode
- Episode no.: Season 1 Episode 1
- Directed by: Greg Yaitanes
- Written by: Hart Hanson
- Production code: 1AKY79
- Original air date: September 13, 2005

Guest appearances
- Chris Conner as Oliver Laurier; John M. Jackson as FBI Deputy Director Sam Cullen; Larry Poindexter as Senator Alan Bethlehem; Sam Trammell as Ken Thompson; Tyrees Allen as Ted Eller; Bonita Friedericy as Sharron Eller; Naja Hill as Cleo Louise Eller; Dominic Fumusa as Peter St. James; Dave Roberson as Bennett Gibson; John Sterling Carter as Agent Furst; Katherine Ann McGregor as Mrs. Bethlehem; Charles Janasz as Reverend; Damian T. Raven as Uniformed Security; Yun Choi as FBI Agent #1; Jeff Witzke as FBI Agent #2; Mary Sue Perry as Customs Agent; Billy Briggs as Airport Clerk

Episode chronology
← Previous —	Next → "The Man in the S.U.V."

"Pilot" is the pilot episode and the first episode of the first season of the American television series Bones. Originally aired on Fox on September 13, 2005, it was written by series creator Hart Hanson and directed by Greg Yaitanes. The episode introduces the two main characters of the series, Dr. Temperance Brennan (played by Emily Deschanel) and FBI Special Agent Seeley Booth (played by David Boreanaz), and their partnership in solving cases involving unidentified human remains.

== Summary ==
Returning to Washington, D.C. after two months in Guatemala where she was identifying victims of genocide, renowned forensic anthropologist Dr. Temperance Brennan is accosted at the airport by an agent from Homeland Security for carrying a human skull in her bag. When the agent grabs her, Brennan, who is a student of three different martial arts, takes him down, causing security to draw their guns on her. Upon the arrival of FBI Special Agent Seeley Booth, Brennan is released, and she realizes it was his plot to get her to help him on an FBI case. She refuses until Booth promises her full participation in the case.

At the crime scene, Brennan and Booth find decomposed human remains with only the bones remaining. Brennan and her assistant Zack Addy (Eric Millegan) determine the victim is a woman 18 to 22 years old and a tennis player. Back at the Jeffersonian Institute, Brennan argues with her boss Dr. Daniel Goodman (Jonathan Adams) for assigning her to work with other federal agencies without consulting her.

Inside the Medico-Legal Lab of the Jeffersonian Institute, Brennan examines the victim's remains while her colleagues inquire about the resemblances between themselves and the characters in her new book, Bred in the Bone. Dr. Jack Hodgins (T. J. Thyne), an entomologist, finds that the victim has been in the pond for more than two summers. Hodgins also found small bone fragments in the silt, which he guesses are Rana temporaria or, simply, frog bones. Dr Brennan's best friend Angela Montenegro (Michaela Conlin), a forensic artist who flashed the airport clerk to get his attention when trying to find Brennan to pick her up at the start of the episode, uses a computer program she has developed (called the Angelator} to make a three-dimensional holographic reconstruction of the reassembled skull. The victim is revealed to be Cleo Louise Eller, a missing Senate intern who was rumored to have had an affair with Senator Bethlehem.

Brennan wants to confront the Senator but Booth argues that he is not the only suspect. The Senator's aide, Ken Thompson, was Cleo's boyfriend. There is also Cleo's stalker, Oliver Laurier. Booth tells Brennan that they have a major case and that FBI Deputy Director Cullen is going to want to set up a special unit to investigate. To do everything by the book he wants her to stay at her lab; but Brennan coerces Booth into agreeing to let her come with him into the field.

Based on the particulates embedded in Cleo's skull, Hodgins determines that Cleo's skull may have been smashed by a sledgehammer on a cement floor with diatomaceous earth. By the distinctive damage done to her finger pads and the way the body was hidden, the team determines that the murderer had put a lot of effort into hiding the body. Hodgins also reveals that Cleo was taking medicine for her depression, while Brennan realizes that the small bones found with Cleo's body are not frog bones but fetal ear bones, indicating Cleo Eller was pregnant.

Hodgins, a devout conspiracy theorist, convinces Brennan that they may never find the truth because Senator Bethlehem will impede the investigation. Without telling Booth, Brennan recklessly confronts the Senator. Consequently, Deputy Director Cullen removes Booth from the case, but Brennan refuses to give up. With the help of her fellow scientists, she uncovers evidence that Cleo Eller's boyfriend, Ken Thompson, had killed Cleo because he feared the scandal of Cleo's pregnancy would affect his career negatively.

== Cultural references ==
Almost every episode of season one contains a popular culture reference to which Brennan replies with her catch phrase, "I don't know what that means".

In this episode, Booth references The X-Files saying: "We're Scully and Mulder."

== Production details ==
Despite the fact that the series is set in Washington, D.C., filming of the pilot and subsequent episodes primarily took place in Los Angeles, California. Footage of Washington, D.C. was shot by the second unit with body doubles. The first scene featuring the characters Angela Montenegro and Dr. Temperance Brennan inside Washington Dulles International Airport was actually shot at Los Angeles Convention Center, while the opening shot of a plane landing was taken from footage filmed at Ronald Reagan Washington National Airport.

Series creator and writer Hart Hanson describes the murder victim at the center of the episode as a "Chandra-Levy-type congressional intern". The story alludes to the power of politicians and allowed Hanson to establish the character of Dr. Temperance Brennan, who is driven to find the truth despite the barriers presented by politics.

== Reception ==
The pilot episode of Bones attracted an average of 10.8 million viewers with 6.7% household share and 11% household rating. It was the highest number of viewers Fox has received for a prime-time Tuesday-night drama series premiere since 24 premiered on November 6, 2001. Bones finished first among the 18 to 49 years old demographic and in total viewers in its Tuesday 8:00 pm ET time slot.

Based on the episode, New York described the show as "the best drama of the new network season" and a "sexed-up variation of all the CSIs". Gillian Flynn of Entertainment Weekly writes that although Bones has a "pretty standard Crossing Jordan/CSI-style framework", its main attraction is the chemistry between the two lead characters; "that old Sam-and-Diane, Maddie-and-David, Mulder-and-Scully opposites-attract stuff never feels standard when it's done right." Similarly, USA Today comments that compared to other crime shows, the show "is built on a more traditional and solid foundation: the strength of its characters" and "what sets Tuesday's Bones premiere apart from the procedural pack are stars Emily Deschanel and David Boreanaz, as the season's most appealing new crime fighters."

On the other hand, Media Life Magazine says that while Bones has "an amazingly clever notion, brilliant even", its "execution doesn't match the conception" and "fails to evolve into a gripping series. In fact, it quickly becomes so derivative of so much else on television - especially, strangely, X-Files - that one might even call it bone-headed." In the opinion of Variety's Brian Lowry, the pilot lacked originality. He writes: "'Bones' aspires to achieve a mix of 'House' and 'X-Files' chic (there's even a reference to Scully and Mulder), but for the most part its playful banter feels forced and the way-cool visual flourishes overly familiar. What's left, then, is another crime procedural with a not-especially-fresh twist, which, admittedly, has proved a surprisingly durable skeleton over which to drape new dramas."

== Music ==
The song played during the funeral scene is "Gone," from Thirteen Senses's album The Invitation. The song played when Dr. Brennan is re-constructing the skull is "Collide" (VF) by Howie Day and/or "Broken Bridge" (VO) by Daughter Darling. The song played in the senator's house is "Teardrop" by Massive Attack.
