= The Girl in the Fridge =

- Bones episode
- Episode no.: Season 1 Episode 8
- Directed by: Sanford Bookstaver
- Written by: Dana Coen
- Production code: 1AKY07
- Original air date: November 29, 2005

Guest appearances
- Josh Hopkins as Michael Stires; Leonard Roberts as D.A. Andrew Levitt; Alicia Coppola as Joy Deaver; Rachel Miner as Mary Costello

Episode chronology
← Previous "A Man on Death Row"	Next → "The Man in the Fallout Shelter"

"The Girl in the Fridge" is the eighth episode of the first season of the television series, Bones. Originally aired on November 29, 2005 on FOX network, the episode is written by Dana Coen and directed by Sanford Bookstaver. The episode features FBI Special Agent Seeley Booth and Dr. Temperance Brennan's investigation into the human remains of a teenage girl found inside a refrigerator and a subplot concerning the relationship between Brennan and her former lover and professor, Michael Stires.

== Summary ==
Dr. Brennan's former professor from Northwestern University, Dr. Michael Stires, drops by for a visit. The two also have a casual sexual relationship which Brennan assumes is not complicated. She also thinks that they have a healthy professional rivalry. Both these assumptions are tested in a new case that starts with the decayed remains found in an old refrigerator. The remains belong to Maggie Schilling, a 19-year-old dancer who was estranged from her family. She was briefly held for ransom 11 months earlier before the negotiations suddenly terminated.

Dr. Jack Hodgins and Brennan's assistant, Zack Addy, determine that the victim had hyperparathyroidism, which is confirmed by the victim's former doctor. The doctor discloses to Booth and Brennan that his former office manager, Mary Costello, had supplied the victim with drugs. The investigation swiftly leads to two likely suspects, Mary Costello and her husband, when Booth sees their new refrigerator and later finds handcuffs in their basement that Brennan suspects may have caused the stress fractures on the victim's wrist.

The twist in the tale occurs when Michael is recruited by the defense as an expert witness. The trial boils down to a contest between the cold factual style of Bones and the charming layman approach of Michael. The prosecution's jury consultant highlights this standoff as a "choice between reality and perception", and she goes on to state that perception wins cases. In the first few rounds, the expert witness for defense has the upper hand with his charming layman approach and his smear campaign against Brennan. Booth decides to bring out an emotional testimony from Brennan by asking the prosecution to bring up her missing parents and the reason for her being a forensic anthropologist. This breaks the proverbial ice between the jury and Brennan, leading to a conviction by the jury.

Michael tries to reconcile with Brennan, who ignores him. Booth apologizes to Brennan for breaching her privacy but states that it was necessary for their case. Seeing Brennan's sadness, Angela Montenegro tries to invite her for a drink but Brennan declines. Booth brings Brennan to another crime scene, where he apologizes to her again. Brennan accepts his apology, saying that she would have done what he did in the same situation.

== Music ==
The episode featured Hold Tight by Mark Geary.

== Production details ==
In chronological order, "The Girl in the Fridge" was written and filmed after "The Man in the Wall", which was aired as the series' sixth episode while "The Girl in the Fridge" was aired as the series' eighth episode. According to the writer of the episode, Dana Coen, the main focus of the episode was on Brennan's character, showing the audience "why she struggles to live a life of science in the service of her heart" and "how the loss of her parents defined her."
