= A Boy in a Tree =

- Bones episode
- Episode no.: Season 1 Episode 3
- Directed by: Patrick Norris
- Written by: Hart Hanson
- Production code: 1AKY01
- Original air date: September 27, 2005

Guest appearances
- Toby Hemingway as Tucker Pattison; Kayla Mae Maloney as Camden Destry; Avis Wrentmore as Melodee Destry; Marlene Forte as Ambassador Olivos; Tom Dugan as Headmaster Ronson; José Zúñiga as Mickey Santana; Samual Carman as Nestor Olivos

Episode chronology
← Previous "The Man in the S.U.V."	Next → "The Man in the Bear"

"A Boy in a Tree" is the third episode of the first season of the television series Bones. Originally aired on September 27, 2005 on Fox network, the episode is written by Hart Hanson and directed by Patrick Norris. The plot features FBI Special Agent Seeley Booth and Dr. Temperance Brennan's investigation of a teenage boy's remains found inside an exclusive private school.

== Summary ==
Booth brings Brennan and her assistant Zack Addy to the exclusive Hanover Preparatory School, where a decomposing body has been found hanging from a tree. They retrieve the body and return to their lab at the Jeffersonian Institution in Washington, D.C., where they confirm that the body belongs to a teenage boy, most likely a student. Dr. Jack Hodgins determines that the boy died 10 to 14 days earlier.

As Booth asks for a list of students from the headmaster of the school, Brennan calls to tell him of the cochlear implant she found in the victim's ear. She informs him that they will be able to identify the victim by tracing the serial number on the device. The victim is Nestor Olivos, a student of the school and the only son of the Venezuelan ambassador. The team finds it odd that Nestor's hyoid bone is broken, as the hyoid of an adolescent should be flexible and almost unbreakable.

While the school's headmaster and its head of security are adamant that Nestor had committed suicide, Nestor's mother, the Venezuelan ambassador, urges Dr. Brennan to find the truth and believes that Nestor had been murdered. The central mystery of the case is whether Nestor killed himself or was murdered.

Based on the Tabinid maggots' pupal casing, Hodgins determines that Nestor ingested a heavy dose of ketamine, a dissociative anesthetic, before he died. However, the team cannot be certain if the boy had taken the drug involuntarily but Dr. Brennan is able to give a scenario of Nestor's death involving the ketamine. Combined with the ketamine, the choking would have caused Nestor to regurgitate stomach acids, which would have been trapped in the throat and weakened the hyoid bone. The weight of Nestor's body could then break his hyoid.

In addition to the forensic evidence, Dr. Brennan and Agent Booth find DVD recordings of sexual activities, which they discover had led to blackmail. Nestor's classmates Tucker Pattison and Camden Destry had set up a video camera facing Nestor's bed. After Tucker used a video recording to blackmail Camden's mother, he and Camden decided to blackmail Nestor as well. When Tucker and Camden learned that Nestor was going to tell the headmaster of their blackmail attempt, they drugged Nestor and hung him on a tree in order to feign a suicide. In the end, Dr. Brennan and Agent Booth were able to prove that Nestor was murdered.

After the case, Booth is given his own access pass to the lab courtesy of Brennan.

== Music ==
The episode featured music by the following artists: -

- Miles from Montery - West Indian Girl
- Sunshine everywhere - Deep Audio
- City Streets - Positive Flow
- Cold Hands (Warm Heart) - Brendan Benson

== Production details ==
The episode was written and filmed prior to "The Man in the S.U.V.", which was aired as the series' second episode. The story of "A Boy in a Tree" was conceived to explore the differences between the characters Temperance Brennan and Seeley Booth. Hart Hanson, writer of the episode, describes Brennan as "a product of top-notch private schools" while Booth is "a product of public schools and the down and dirty education of the US Army."

== Response ==
On its original airdate in the Tuesday 8:00 pm ET timeslot, the episode attracted 7.57 million viewers with 5.8% household rating and 9% household share. Fox ordered a full season of Bones after the airing of the first three episodes had Bones ranked consistently in first place among the key demographics in the Tuesday 8:00 pm ET timeslot.
