= The Man in the Fallout Shelter =

- Bones episode
- Episode no.: Season 1 Episode 9
- Directed by: Greg Yaitanes
- Written by: Hart Hanson
- Production code: 1AKY08
- Original air date: December 13, 2005

Guest appearances
- Heavy D as Sid Shapiro; Billy Gibbons as Angela's father; Margaret Avery as Ivy Gillespie; Ty Panitz as Parker Booth; Jim Ortlieb as Hal; Bob Bouchard as Mr. Addy; Christina Copeland as Lisa Pearce

Episode chronology
← Previous "The Girl in the Fridge"	Next → "The Woman at the Airport"

"The Man in the Fallout Shelter" is the ninth episode of the first season of the television series, Bones. Originally aired on December 13, 2005 on FOX network, the episode is written by Hart Hanson and directed by Greg Yaitanes. The plot features FBI Special Agent Seeley Booth, Dr. Temperance Brennan and the rest of her team being forced to remain at the Jeffersonian Institute over the Christmas holiday.

== Summary ==
This is a holiday episode based on events happening on Christmas Eve. On December 23, Booth brings in the skeletal remains of a man found dead in a bomb shelter discovered recently. Everyone is in Christmas-Eve mode with a company party going on upstairs. Bones and the rest of the team start investigating the dead man's story when Zack triggers the bio-hazard alarm while cutting through the skeleton.

The lab is shut down for containment and every one is under quarantine based on the discovery of a fungus causing Valley fever (even though it's not actually contagious). The prospect of spending the two mandatory quarantine days away from friends and family makes everyone morose. Booth develops a side-effect of euphoria due to drugs given to immunize them from the disease.

The case, meanwhile, progresses into the discovery of a love affair between the dead man, Lionel Little, who worked as a lease inspector for a company called Silver Cloud Petroleum and had a coin collection, and his black cleaning lady (Ivy Gillespie) in the late 1950s. Due to the oppressive racial climate in the US, they planned to emigrate to France. Lionel tried to sell his valuable coin collection to a shifty con artist who murdered Lionel to procure the collection (worth approximately $8000 at the time).

An emotional segment in the show occurs when everyone gets to meet their family and friends with Christmas carols crooning in the background. We find out that Booth has a 4-year-old son named Parker (because his mother didn’t marry him, his parental rights are vague), and that Billy Gibbons from ZZ Top is Angela's father.

With everyone else in the lab celebrating Christmas with secret Santa gifts, Bones decides to track down Ivy and reveal the lethal mystery behind Lionel's disappearance to her. Bones does this on Angela's advice. Angela says that Bones must find Ivy so she can have the closure that Temperance herself never had (her parents disappeared when she was 15, and no information has been uncovered regarding their whereabouts). Bones, listening to her friend, goes to her office and starts making phone calls trying to locate Ivy Gillespie. Finally, on Christmas morning, she finds Ivy’s granddaughter who provides information to contact her.

Bones asks Booth to look at the penny they found in Lionel’s pocket. She scanned it to find out that it was actually a bronze penny minted in 1943, unlike almost all pennies from that time that were made of zinc clad steel to conserve copper for World War II. Today, there are just 12 of them and it is worth over $100,000. Dr. Goodman enters telling them that it is time for the results.

They are all together waiting for the results as the Head of the Jeffersonian and other guys in biohazard suits are running them in a computer and a green light turns on. They remove their helmets and one of them tells “Merry Christmas”. They all start walking out the Jeffersonian but Temperance stays behind. When Booth realizes it he stops and turns to her, she just says: “Go, go have Christmas. Wish your boy a Merry Christmas from me,” to which he says: “I’m at Wong Foo’s if you decide you want company. Merry Christmas Bones,” and he leaves.

A young and an elderly woman came in the lab. They are Lisa Pearce (granddaughter) and Ivy Gillespie. Bones takes them to her office and she starts explaining all that happened. Ivy starts crying when she realizes that she wasn't abandoned by Lionel; that he was actually trying to keep his promise to go to Paris. But that is not all the happiness that Temperance gave them. Lisa wants to be a doctor but can’t afford it, but Brennan gives her and her grandmother Lionel's 1943 bronze penny, worth over $100,000.

After visiting Booth at Wong Foo's, Bones returns to the lab alone and retrieves several wrapped gifts and cards from an old suitcase; it was previously explained that when her parents went missing around Christmas, Brennan had childishly refused to open their presents to her until they returned - which they never did. Sitting alone on the couch with Angela's holographic Christmas tree and leftover decorations still up, Temperance finally opens her parents' gifts to her and smiles through her tears.

== Music ==
The episode featured the following music:

- "Have Yourself a Merry Little Christmas" - Tori Amos
- "Winter Wonderland" - Jewel
- "Let It Snow, Let It Snow, Let It Snow" - Brian Setzer

== Conception ==
The episode was written especially for the Christmas holiday in time to be aired in December in the United States. It takes place at Christmas time, which the writers describe as "a holiday vacuum sealed with family and friends within its own parcel of time. It has its own parameters, its own rules - memories that are reconstructed and improved in our minds by years of conditioning." This setting allowed the writers to expand on the details of the characters' lives and to continue with Brennan's background story, concerning the disappearance of her parents and her experiences in foster care system.

== Response ==
As a lead-in program for House, Bones attracted 7.12 million viewers on December 13, 2005 with episode "The Man in the Fallout Shelter". In the Tuesday 8:00 pm ET timeslot, the episode ranked fourth overall in total viewership and among 18 to 49 years old viewers.

== Culture references ==
Hodgins makes a reference to How the Grinch Stole Christmas by Dr Seuss. Hodgins also makes a reference to Firefly when talking to Zack.
