= The Woman at the Airport =

- Bones episode
- Episode no.: Season 1 Episode 10
- Directed by: Greg Yaitanes
- Written by: Teresa Lin
- Production code: 1AKY10
- Original air date: January 25, 2006

Guest appearances
- Marika Dominczyk as Leslie Snow; Claire Coffee as Special Agent Tricia Finn; Michael B. Silver as Dr. Anton Kostov; Harry Groener as Dr. Henry Atlas; Penny Marshall as herself; Natalia Nogulich as Ivana Bardu; Jann Carl as herself; Adam Grimes as Nick Hudson; McNally Sagal as Martina Sikes

Episode chronology
← Previous "The Man in the Fallout Shelter"	Next → "The Woman in the Car"

"The Woman at the Airport" is the tenth episode of the first season of the television series, Bones. Originally aired on January 25, 2006 on Fox network, the episode is written by Teresa Lin and directed by Greg Yaitanes. While the series takes place mostly in Washington, D.C., this episode is also set in Los Angeles, California, featuring FBI Special Agent Seeley Booth and Dr. Temperance Brennan's investigation into a woman whose remains were found at several locations in the Los Angeles International Airport.

== Summary ==
The well preserved remains of an Iron Age specimen piques the professional interest of everyone in the lab. While Dr. Brennan and Zach start working on it, Booth brings in another case, skeletal remains of a victim that are dispersed around Los Angeles airport. Booth triumphs over Brennan's refusal to join the investigation in favor of the more scholarly forensics by dangling the attraction of a high profile Hollywood case to Brennan's superior, Dr. Goodman.

Initial investigation reveals that the bones were scattered by coyotes to everyone's mild surprise. The Special Agent in Los Angeles, Tricia Finn, pesters Brennan about the upcoming movie based on her novel and tries to promote her screenplay talents. The dead person turns out to be a high profile call girl with a penchant for plastic surgery for beautification. The pervasive bone restructuring of the face render facial reconstruction impossible. Brennan is also distressed by the culture of physical insecurity, leading to an industry of plastic surgery in the city. The circumstantial evidence points to two surgeons who operated on the dead woman. But the ending reveals that it was one of the call girl's colleagues, Leslie Snow, who murdered her out of jealousy. Meanwhile, a standoff between Dr. Hodgins and Dr. Goodman is resolved when Hodgins discovers that the intentions behind avoiding forensic investigations on the Iron Age skeleton is more out of deference to the well preserved body and less due to administrative jurisprudence.

== Music ==
The episode featured the following music:

- Ooh La La - Goldfrapp
- Precious - Depeche Mode
- Show Your Style - Ferry Corsten
- Free Los Angeles - Baby
- I'm Slipping Away - Messy

== Cultural references ==
- In this episode, the call girl Booth interrogated mentions the murder victim's boyfriend, Nick, had a role as a terrorist in 24, another Fox produced drama. In reality, the only credited actors with the name Nick in 24 are Nick Jameson, who portrayed a Russian president, and Nick Offerman, who portrayed a racist that was arrested.
- When Temperance asks to drive the rental car in California, she says that she is an excellent driver, and Booth responds, "OK, Rain Man."

== Conception ==
According to the writer of the episode, Teresa Lin, the main idea of the episode is "what makes up identity" and "how we are all, to some degree, caught up in the world of youth, beauty and perception." Lin expresses that many reality television shows have illustrated that "looks can have a profound impact on what we are deemed to be worth" and "can send the wrong message". Moreover, Lin conveys the irony in the story is that the victim in the episode is murdered not because of "who she was but for who she seemed to be."
