= Elizabeth Benjamin =

American television writer and producer

Elizabeth Benjamin is an American television writer and producer.

Benjamin has worked on the series Law & Order: Criminal Intent, Bones, Crash, UnReal, 13 Reasons Why, The Man In The High Castle, Dead To Me and The Flight Attendant.

A former modern dancer, Benjamin has danced for a number of choreographers including Molissa Fenley, David Parsons, & Twyla Tharp.

== Awards ==
- Edgar Allan Poe Award for Best Television Teleplay for Law & Order: Criminal Intent "Want."
- Best Writing Short Film, Didactic Encounter, Williamsburg, Brooklyn Film Festival.
- Gold Ogle Award for, "The Field," Best Fantasy/Horror/Mystery Audio Production of the Year presented by the American Society for Science Fiction Audio and the Minnesota Society for Interest in Science Fiction and Fantasy.

== Filmography ==
Year	Title	Notes
1997	Didactic Encounter	Writer
2003–2005	Law & Order: Criminal Intent	Writer, 4 episodes
2005–2009	Bones	Producer, executive story editor, and writer
2008	Criminal Minds	Writer, 2 episodes
2009	Crash	Supervising producer and writer, 13 episodes
2011	United States of Tara	Supervising producer and writer, 12 episodes
2011	Rizzoli & Isles	Supervising producer and writer, 15 episodes
2013	Red Widow	Supervising producer and writer, 8 episodes
2014	The Blacklist	Co-executive producer and writer, 8 episodes
2015	Unreal	Co-executive producer and writer, 10 episodes
2015	Blood & Oil	Co-executive producer, 9 episodes
2017	13 Reasons Why	Co-executive producer and writer, 13 episodes
2018	The Man in the High Castle	Co-executive producer and writer, 10 episodes
2019	What/If	Co-executive producer and writer, 10 episodes
2020	Dead to Me	Co-executive producer and writer, 10 episodes
2022	Bridgerton	Co-executive producer, 8 episodes
2022	The Flight Attendant	Co-executive producer, 8 episodes
TBA	Bad Crimes	Co-executive producer
TBA	Girl in Snow	Writer, 1 episode
