= Zack Addy =

Fictional character

- Bones character
- First appearance: September 13, 2005 (1x01, "Pilot")
- Last appearance: March 11, 2017 (12x11, "The Day in the Life")
- Created by: Hart Hanson
- Portrayed by: Eric Millegan

In-universe information
- Full name: Zachary Uriah Addy
- Nicknames: Zackaroni, Zacko, Z-Man, King of the Lab, King of the Loony-bin, Bone-Boy
- Gender: Male
- Title: Doctor (Ph.D)
- Occupation: Former Graduate student; Former Dr. Brennan's assistant; Former Forensic anthropologist; Former criminal's apprentice
- Affiliation: Jeffersonian Institute
- Family: 3 brothers, 4 sisters
- Religion: Rational Empiricist (Raised Lutheran)

Zachary "Zack" Uriah Addy, Ph.D., is a fictional character in the television series Bones. The character is portrayed by Eric Millegan and was introduced as Dr. Temperance Brennan's young assistant at the beginning of the series before he received his doctorate in forensic anthropology in season 2. Millegan was a main character throughout seasons 1 to 3, appearing in all episodes. Since then, he has made guest appearances in season 4, season 5, the season 11 finale, and had a recurring role in the series' final season. In the penultimate episode of the series, "The Day in the Life", Zack is exonerated for the murder that left him incarcerated at the end of season 3.

== Character history ==
Zack Addy grew up in Michigan and is the youngest of three brothers and four sisters. He is a child prodigy with an I.Q. level above 163 and an eidetic memory. According to his character bio on the DVD for Season 1, Addy graduated from college at the age of 16. At the beginning of the show, he has started two doctorates—one in forensic anthropology, the completion of which is shown on-screen in the episode "Judas on a Pole," and the other in applied engineering, the completion of which is referred to in "The Killer in the Concrete". His specialty is in the analysis of remains, especially identifying the causes of death and weapons from marks on skeletal remains. Usually, it is his task to remove the flesh from the bones, a process known as maceration. Addy’s best friend is Jack Hodgins.

Towards the end of Season 1, Addy decides not to complete his doctorate so that he will remain as Dr. Brennan's assistant. His colleagues conspire to make Addy less comfortable to motivate him to complete his studies, thus encouraging him to fulfill his potential as more than just an assistant. Addy completes his doctorate and is given a job at the Jeffersonian by the new forensics head, Dr. Camille Saroyan.

At the end of Season 2, Zack Addy receives a request from the President's office to leave for Iraq. It is revealed in Episode 1 of Season 3 that he had just returned from a three-month stint in Iraq, having returned early because he "failed to assimilate."

In the final episode of Season 3, Addy receives major injuries, such as sustaining severe third degree burns and destruction of cartilage on both of his hands after an explosion in the lab. It is later revealed that he was working as an apprentice to the Gormogon, a cannibalistic serial killer, and the explosion was staged by himself as a distraction. Since Hodgins was standing too close due to arguing with Zack, it let the thermoplastic reach its boiling point and explode three times more powerful than Zack calculated. Addy’s weaker personality was easily manipulated by Gormogon, though he still maintained loyalty to his friends. He gives up the location of Gormogon's house after Brennan makes him realize his logic is at fault by pointing out that he was willing to injure himself to keep Hodgins safe. At the end of the episode, prosecutor Caroline Julian cuts a deal with Addy. He pleads guilty to killing the lobbyist and declares Non compos mentis, which leads him into a mental asylum rather than to prison.

The episode "The Perfect Pieces in the Purple Pond" reveals Addy is receiving psychological treatment from FBI psychologist Dr. Lance Sweets. Later in the episode, returning to the asylum from which he escaped, he tells Sweets that although he helped Gormogon find the lobbyist, he himself had not actually stabbed him. Sweets insists he has to change his story, but Addy refuses to do so. He fears that if his secret were to be revealed, he would end up in prison where he would suffer.

In the Season 4 finale, Zack Addy is considered a suspect when a man is murdered in a popular nightclub owned by Booth and Brennan. At the end of the episode, it is revealed that the entire thing was in fact a dream about an alternate timeline that Booth had while being unconscious and is the part of a new book Brennan was writing.

Zack Addy returns in the 100th episode as a flashback to Booth and Brennan's first case together.

The last two episodes in season 11 introduce a serial killer named The Puppeteer, due to the nature of the crimes and how the killer would hang the victims from wires and use them as puppets. Over the past few weeks, Dr. Brennan has been having vivid nightmares and seeks a therapist's help to interpret her dreams. The therapist makes Brennan realize that the attacker in her dreams is someone she knows. The team goes over all the clues about the puppeteer and realize that they point to Zack Addy.

The Season 12 premiere of Bones reveals that Addy has taken Brennan to the old vault of the Gormogon, which is in the basement of the Jeffersonian, with the intention of protecting her from The Puppeteer and to reveal the truth about himself. Booth captures him, and he is taken into custody. After the death of Lance Sweets, Addy harmed himself in a fit of devastation, leaving occasional blackouts from minor brain damage. Addy consults the evidence files on the puppeteer case and concludes that he committed the crimes while blacked out and wishes to return to the mental institution. The team at the Jeffersonian finds out that it is instead Addy’s doctor from the institution, Dr. Mihir Roshan, who has been committing the murders and arranging the skeleton marionettes. Dr. Roshan intended to poison Addy, but Booth arrives at the institution in time to save him by shooting Roshan. Unable to kill Roshan himself, Addy concludes he could not have committed murder under the order of the Gormogon, and confesses his innocence to Brennan and Booth.

In "The Steal on the Wheels," the Jeffersonian team is able to locate the body of the Gormogon's former apprentice, the true killer, and match the blood on it to the lobbyist Addy supposedly killed. In "The Day in the Life," Addy goes before a judge for his appeal. Based on this new evidence, Zack Addy is acquitted of the murder charge, but not of aiding a known killer. As a result, he will have to finish the remaining thirteen months of his sentence, a result Addy readily accepts.

== Characterization ==
Despite his intelligence, Zack is characterized as being unsure of himself, though he does provide insights to some of the team's cases. He is unable to forcefully express his opinion to Dr. Brennan, possibly due to romantic feelings toward her. When he discovers Temperance's own Forensic Anthropology professor had become her lover, Zack repeatedly wonders aloud whether he might enter into a similar relationship with Dr. Brennan. His colleagues quickly dismissed this idea as nonsense.Zack appears to have an on and off-again relationship with "Naomi in Paleontology".

After the reveal that the character of Zack Addy was working with the Gormogon, Addy was no longer a regular character on the show. Series creator Hart Hanson had said he may become a recurring character to provide consults to the team with "certain talents we can use in a 'Hannibal Lecter' kind of way."

Outside the laboratory, Addy struggles with social interaction and intuition, making him a relatable figure for viewers who may also navigate similar challenges. He is very literal-minded and is often confused by colloquial expressions or metaphor, despite his high intelligence. His attempts to use such expressions are met with mixed success, such as referring to a skull he'd cleaned as being "clean enough to eat off of". His inability to pick up on pop culture references or jokes was often a source of comedy in the show. Other characters, especially Booth and Hodgins, were often annoyed by his lack of social skills.
