= Temperance "Bones" Brennan =

Character from the tv-series "Bones"

Dr. Temperance "Bones" Brennan, PhD.
- Bones character
- Photograph of Brennan, as portrayed by Emily Deschanel
- First appearance: September 13, 2005 (1x01, "Pilot")
- Last appearance: March 28, 2017 (12x12, "The End in the End")
- Created by: Hart Hanson
- Portrayed by: Emily Deschanel

In-universe information
- Aliases: Wanda Moosejaw; Roxy Scallion; Natasha (of Boris and Natasha)
- Nicknames: Bones (by Seeley & Parker Booth); Tempe (by Max Keenan, Russ Brennan and Jared Booth); Sweetie (by Angela Montenegro); Bren/Dr. B (by some co-workers); Joy (name at birth)
- Gender: Female
- Title: Doctor (triple Ph.D.)
- Occupation: Anthropologist, forensic anthropologist, kinesiologist, author
- Family: Max Keenan (father; deceased); Christine Brennan (mother; deceased); Russ Brennan (brother)
- Spouses: Seeley Booth (husband; 2013–present)
- Children: Christine Angela Booth (daughter; born 2012); Hank Booth II (son; born 2015); Parker Booth (stepson)
- Relatives: Hank Booth (grandfather-in-law); Edwin Booth (father-in-law; deceased); Marianne Booth (mother-in-law); Jared Booth (brother-in-law; deceased); Amy Hollister (sister-in-law; Hayley Hollister (niece); Emma Hollister (niece); Margaret Whitesell (second cousin)
- Home: Washington, D.C.

Dr. Temperance "Bones" Brennan, Ph.D. (born Joy Keenan) is a fictional character portrayed by Emily Deschanel in the American Fox television series Bones. An anthropologist, forensic anthropologist, and kinesiologist, she is described in the series as a leading authority in the field of forensic anthropology. Brennan first appeared on television, along with other series characters, in the "Pilot" episode of Bones on September 13, 2005. She is the titular female protagonist of the series.

Brennan is loosely based on author Kathy Reichs. Her name originates from the heroine in Reichs's crime novel series, also named Temperance Brennan. The main similarity the two share is their occupation as forensic anthropologists. Brennan appeared in Comcast's list of TV's Most Intriguing Characters. She was included in AfterEllen.com's Top 50 Favorite Female TV Characters. Her relationship with Seeley Booth was listed in Entertainment Weekly's "30 Best 'Will They/Won't They?' TV Couples".

== Character history ==
Temperance "Bones" Brennan is a forensic anthropologist who works in the Medico-Legal lab at the Jeffersonian Institute in Washington, D.C. She received her bachelor's degree and Ph.D. from Northwestern University, as stated in "The Girl in the Fridge" and "The Tutor in the Tussle". She has three doctorates, as referred to by Dr. Jack Hodgins in the episode "The Parts of the Sum in the Whole", in anthropology, forensic anthropology, and kinesiology; it is implied that most of her work at the lab is related to either long-dead bodies or victims of genocide.

Her occasional contract work for the FBI shifted the focus of her work. She was paired with FBI Special Agent Seeley Booth and helped to solve two difficult cases; since then, they have worked together almost exclusively on modern-day murder cases.

Brennan works with a group of other well-qualified colleagues, including the entomologist Jack Hodgins (T. J. Thyne), her boss and forensic pathologist Camille Saroyan (Tamara Taylor), forensic artist Angela Montenegro (Michaela Conlin), and a host of graduate students. Booth refers to her crew of colleagues as "squints", because they come to crime scenes and squint at the evidence. He is also responsible for her nickname, "Bones", which she initially detested.

In the first-season finale (which aired on May 17, 2006), Brennan stated that she was born in 1976, which would have made her either 29 or 30 (approximately the same age as Deschanel, who was born on October 11, 1976). In the fifth-season episode "The Death of the Queen Bee" (which aired nearly four years later, on April 15, 2010), it is implied that her then-current age was 33 years, based on Brennan's identification of a former classmate from Burtonsville High School (presumably located in Burtonsville, Illinois) as the victim and statement that the classmate was 33. In "The Woman in Limbo", it is revealed that before her parents' disappearance her family lived in Chicago, Illinois.

First mentioned in season 1, Brennan has a love of dolphins, which she shared with her late mother: in the season one finale, "The Woman in Limbo", Brennan examines a custom-made belt with a dolphin on the buckle, which had belonged to her mother, and which she mentions having once borrowed without asking first. Brennan's love of dolphins has highlighted again in season 2 episodes "The Titan on the Tracks", "The Killer in the Concrete" and "Stargazer in a Puddle", when she mentions the constellation Delphinus, (the Dolphin), her and her mother's favorite. In season 6, "The Doctor in the Photo", she is shown to wear a dolphin ring.

In season one, "Pilot", Dr. Brennan returns from Guatemala, where she identified victims of genocide. "I've been in Guatemala for two months, identifying victims of genocide."

In season one, in "A Boy in a Bush", Dr. Brennan reveals to Booth "I did an anthropological profile of the suburbs as a grad student." In that same episode, Dr. Brennan reveals to Zach that she worked in Waco after Waco siege (it happened in 1993). "I was at Waco. Branch Davidian compound. I helped identify children who had been killed in the fire, seventeen of them." However, this claim is suspect as she would have only been about 17 years old when the event occurred.

In "Mummy in the Maze", Brennan exhibited ophidiophobia when confronted with snakes, but later only shows a moment of fright when confronted with another snake in "The Mastodon in the Room". She takes note of this, voicing her observation that she only seems to lose her head around snakes when Booth is also "there to be jumped upon", and also she mentions that she once had a pet snake during high school. It should also be noted that, in "The Man in the Morgue," Brennan handled a snake without any trace of fear, even while Booth is in the room.

In season one, in "A Man on Death Row", Brennan expresses her stance on the death penalty; "I believe in the death penalty. There are certain people who shouldn't be in this world. The people who hacked hundreds of innocent children to death in Rwanda; beheaded them at their desks at school! The people who did that, they should be executed." In "The Woman at the Airport", Brennan is shown to have a strong dislike for plastic surgeons, believing them to be no more than "glorified butchers with medical degrees", and this dislike is voiced again in season 4, in "Cinderella in the Cardboard". In "The Woman in the Car", Brennan reveals that her third doctorate is in kinesiology, a field that would allow her and Angela to unravel how one of the bodies that had been found had been killed.

In season two, she expressed the desire to get a pet pig, whom she would have named "Jasper". Brennan's expertise in kinesiology would again prove its worth in "The Truth in the Lye" (she could tell that one of the murder suspects was pregnant just from having observed her gait), in "The Girl with the Curl" (she could tell if one of the young beauty pageant contestants was suffering from scoliosis just by watching them perform on stage), and in "The Woman in the Sand" (while undercover with Booth, she was able to tell Booth exactly how to beat his opponent from just having watched his moves). In "Judas on a Pole", she and her brother are identified as having the same blood type, blood type O. In "Glowing Bones in the Old Stone House", she is shown to be a good cook: Booth's comment on her mac and cheese is that he'd "like to be alone with it".

In the season 3 episode, "Mummy in the Maze", it is revealed that Brennan's favorite superhero is Wonder Woman, and that she always goes as Wonder Woman to the Jeffersonian's Halloween party. In "The Baby in the Bough", it is revealed that Brennan is a registered foster parent, at her brother's request, to take in his stepdaughters in case anything should happen to him and his girlfriend. In the season 3 episode, "Intern in the Incinerator", Booth reveals that Brennan's favorite flower is a Daffodil, her second favorite flower is a Daisy, and her favorite planet is Jupiter.

In season 5, in "The Death of the Queen Bee", when asked if she'd had a pet rat, Brennan discloses that she, in fact, had a pet mouse, snake, and some spiders. During her time at Burtonsville high school, her only friend was the school custodian, Ray Buxley, with whom she would enjoy long, in-depth conversations on life and death, and who would also provide her with dead animals to dissect (Brennan has set out to become a forensic anthropologist,) and who would later be one of her books' biggest fans (she had named the killer in her first book, Bred in the Bone, after him). According to the Burtonsville high school on-line yearbook entry on Brennan, in her senior year, she was a member of the Chemistry club and Math club, her interests were chemistry and mathematics, and she was a National Merit Scholar and an Academic All-Star.

In season 5, "The Parts in the Sum of the Whole", Dr. Brennan reveals to Booth that she speaks six languages. "I speak six languages... two of which you've never even heard of." We can assume that she speaks French after season one's "Pilot".

In the season 6 episode, "The Mastodon in the Room", Dr. Brennan and Daisy return from Maluku Islands; they were on an archaeological dig for one year.

In the season 6 episode, "The Blackout in the Blizzard", Brennan mentions her pet iguana for the first time. This same episode shows that one of the numbers of scientific publications that Brennan reads is Medicinal Physics Quarterly, with one article on electrostatics and triboluminescence proving useful during the lab's power outage. Further concerning her pet iguana in "The Truth in the Myth", as a part of his rehab from alcohol abuse, Vincent Nigel-Murry made apologies for, among other things, having borrowed her iguana one night, wearing him as a hat for a party.

In season 8, "The Tiger in the Tale", Booth mentions to Sweets that Dr. Brennan once took peyote with Native Americans.

In season 11, "The Senator in the Street Sweeper", Dr. Brennan is mentioned to be a member of the Green Party of the United States along with Dr. Hodgins.

=== Family and early life ===
Although Brennan seemed to have a relatively normal childhood, her parents disappeared when she was 15 years old. Her older brother Russ (Loren Dean) was unable to care for her and she was put in the foster care system. By the time she started college she had been to 12 different schools and has specifically said that she hated the lack of consistency.

There has been contradictory evidence about her time in the system; in one episode, Brennan states that her grandfather got her out of the foster system, but in a later episode, she indicates that she never knew her grandparents (possibly the two references are to two separate sets of grandparents, paternal and maternal). However, taking into consideration the fact that Brennan's parents had assumed new identities when she was three years old, the grandfather who had taken her in from her time in the foster system may not have been her biological grandfather.

Her time in foster care was quite traumatic and abusive; Brennan indicated that she was once locked in the trunk of a car for two days because she broke a plate, and in the episode "The Finger in the Nest", she reveals to Booth that she walked into her elderly neighbor's house to find the woman dead. In the same episode, she also mentions to Booth that her parents were very concerned about her afterward, because she started faking her own death. In Season 2, she mentions that during her time in the foster care system, she kept a list of foster homes she had been kicked out of on the bottom of her shoe.

In the first season, she hands Booth the file on her parents' disappearance and he agrees to look into it as a personal favor. It is later revealed in Season 2 that her parents, who were bank robbers specializing in safety deposit boxes, changed the family's identity after they stole some damaging FBI documents regarding the murder of an FBI agent and the false imprisonment of civil rights activist Marvin Beckett (Lou Beatty Jr.). Brennan's birth name was Joy Keenan. Her mother (real name Ruth Keenan, known under the assumed identity of Christine Brennan) had hoped to someday return to her children and family, but made a tape for Brennan to watch on her 16th birthday in case that never happened. Brennan later discovered that Ruth/Christine was murdered in 1993, two years after she and her husband went on the run.

Her father Max Keenan (Ryan O'Neal) re-entered Brennan's life when she and her brother were being threatened by an old acquaintance, who turned out to be Booth's boss, Deputy Director Robert Kirby (Ryan Cutrona). Max evades capture after killing Kirby, and takes Russ into hiding to protect him. Later, Max allows Booth to arrest him in order to improve his relationship with his daughter. At trial, Max is acquitted of murdering Kirby (due in large part to a defense Booth indirectly came up with, positing an alternate theory of the crime in which Temperance was the killer instead, creating reasonable doubt), and he begins to rebuild his life.

He temporarily works at the Jeffersonian as a guide for children visiting the place and demonstrates his brilliant talent as a former science teacher. However, Brennan is concerned about a convicted felon having access to a lab that investigates crimes. Max also introduces Brennan to her cousin Margaret Whitesell, portrayed by Deschanel's real-life sister Zooey Deschanel.

Brennan is best friends with her coworker, Angela, saying in the 6th-season premiere that she loves Angela "like a sister" and is going to be an aunt to Hodgins and Angela's newborn child. It is revealed at the end of the season six finale "The Change in the Game" that Brennan is pregnant and the father is Booth.

In Season 7, Episode 2 "The Hot Dog in the Competition", Brennan and Booth found out they were having a baby girl. Their daughter, Christine Angela Booth (named for Brennan's mother and best friend Angela), was born in a stable during the episode "The Prisoner in the Pipe". In the Season 7 finale, "The Past in the Present", key evidence in the death of her friend, Ethan Sawyer (Darrin Toonder), is linked to Brennan. Max convinces her to go on the run along with Christine, saying that if she is arrested, even if she is found innocent, she may never see her daughter again.

In the Season 8 premiere, it is revealed that while on the run, Brennan was communicating with Angela via flowers and eventually used this as a way to communicate with Booth. Despite being on the run, Brennan risks her safety and decides to meet directly with Booth in a hotel room after months of being a single mother. Eventually, they arrest Sawyer's murderer, Christopher Pelant (Andrew Leeds), and Brennan is allowed to return to her family. Although Pelant blackmails Booth to prevent him from accepting Brennan's proposal by threatening to kill five innocent people if Booth accepted, also warning Booth not to give a reason for his refusal, this threat is removed when the team manages to kill Pelant, and Booth and Brennan marry in the Season 9 episode 6, 'The Woman in White'.

In the Season 10 episode, "The Eye in the Sky", Brennan learns that she is pregnant with her and Booth's second child.

== Characterization ==
Throughout the course of the series, Brennan is portrayed as a brilliant anthropologist, who lacks social skills. Her social ineptitude is especially apparent when it comes to sarcasm, metaphors (which she often interprets literally), and pop culture jokes and is often the source of comedy in the show. An example of this is when she mistakes Colin Farrell for Will Ferrell. In earlier seasons, she was characterized as straightforward and unable to detect social cues – she states that Booth once told her that she "stinks at non-verbal communication" – and was well-known within the FBI for being extremely difficult to work with. She began to acknowledge her lack of sensitivity after Booth told her outright that she was "bad with people" in "A Boy in a Tree". Her lack of "political savvy" and social skills was also a reason why she was passed over for Dr. Camille Saroyan as head of forensic division in the Jeffersonian in Season 2. Other characters have described her as "no fun" and "a rigid traditionalist".

She had a difficult adolescence, and it is implied, often by Sweets, that her withdrawn social tendencies are a defense mechanism. She also sometimes struggles in identifying and explaining her emotions, and takes comfort in the rationality of her anthropological discipline. Although it has been stated that Brennan was based on an autistic person, this has never been confirmed in the plot of the series. Series creator Hart Hanson has stated that the character was never labeled as having the syndrome in order to increase the appeal of the show on network television. This influence on her character is expressed in her extreme rationality in early seasons, as well as some of her social difficulties. Brennan is a self-proclaimed atheist and often points out what she believes to be the irrationality of religious and spiritual beliefs. This has led to more than one argument with Booth, a devout Roman Catholic; he becomes particularly irate when she compares less common religions, such as voodoo, to Christianity. During the Sleepy Hollow crossover episode "Dead Men Tell No Tales", Sleepy Hollow protagonist Ichabod Crane notes that Brennan is so skeptical that she would dismiss the demon Moloch — the primary antagonist in the first two seasons of Sleepy Hollow — as nothing more than a tall man with a skin condition, although this does leave him reassured that she will not realise the nature of the secret tomb they have uncovered underneath the White House.

Brennan is a best-selling author who has been on the New York Times Best Seller List for 18 weeks. She is trained in three types of martial arts, has hunting licenses in four states, a legally registered gun, and a diving certificate. She promised to consider becoming a vegetarian after seeing how pigs were slaughtered (which was also the way her mother had been killed). However, in "The Tough Man in the Tender Chicken" (season 5, episode 6) Angela cites health reasons for Brennan's vegetarian diet. Brennan is also a trained amateur highwire performer, and speaks at least seven other languages, including Spanish, French, Latin, Chinese, Pashto, Japanese (albeit limited to a conversational vocabulary), Norwegian (although she says only "skull" and avers that, as a forensic anthropologist, this is a word she knows "in just about every language"), Farsi, Yiddish, and German. She has also admitted to knowing a bit of Russian. In the Season 6 episode "The Babe in the Bar", whilst demonstrating to Booth her fluency in German, she unwittingly converses with him in that language for a few seconds before checking herself. She often says she does not "put much stock in psychology" and makes a point of noting that Sweets is not a real scientist, as he "bases his life on the vagary of psychology and emotions", even basing the character of a bartender in an unpublished novel (shown during the Season 4 finale "The End in the Beginning") on Sweets who explicitly compares himself to a psychologist.

Brennan's personality undergoes significant changes throughout the course of the series. Her thinking becomes less rigid in later seasons, something which is observed by Dr. Gordon Wyatt, who notes that she is now able to distinguish the difference between accuracy and truth. In season 4, Booth takes her along to his interrogations and helps her learn how to set aside her scientific perspective and relate with the victim's family and suspects on a more interpersonal level. She is also able to put aside her rationality to support her friends in sometimes irrational pursuits, such as Angela's quest to raise money to save a pig from slaughter, and to comfort Booth, even using science or quoting directly from the Bible to rationalize his religious beliefs. Her sensitivity and empathy towards others are also much improved, seen quite strongly when she comforts his grandfather, and when she attends a funeral so that the victim's single mother won't be alone. She also displays more "typical" human emotions when in extreme stress. One example of this is her fear of snakes in "The Mummy in the Maze," when a girl is in the process of being scared to death in a room, the floor teeming with snakes. This goes against her empirical nature, as, when Booth tells her that the snakes are not venomous, she states that she is aware, but still refuses to step in the room, causing Booth to carry her on his back. Usually strong-willed and independent, she has since admitted on multiple occasions that her happiness was contingent on Booth's and could not envision herself living a fulfilled life without him.

Brennan begins to feel both dissatisfaction and discomfort with her work toward the end of the fifth season. She also sees some futility in her work, stating that no matter how many killers they catch, there will always be more. To help her gain new perspective, she later decides to head up an anthropological expedition to Indonesia for a year to identify some ancient proto-human remains, after mulling it over during the episode. However, seven months later, she and everyone else return to D.C. in order to save Cam's job, and they all decide to stay.

As season 6 progresses, Brennan must confront her feelings for Booth, whom she rejected in the 100th episode from the previous season. Having returned from seven months of introspection, she has come to terms with her romantic feelings for him, even admitting that she regretted not having given them a chance together, midway through the season. However, Booth returns from Afghanistan with a new love interest, war correspondent Hannah Burley (Katheryn Winnick), whom Brennan befriends. When Hannah rejects Booth's marriage proposal, Brennan helps him through the emotional fallout.

In the second to last episode of season 6 Booth and Brennan have sex, consummating their relationship, and it is revealed in the last few moments of the season finale that as a result, Brennan has become pregnant, with Booth the father. Throughout the episode ("The Change in the Game") Brennan has been seen asking Angela questions and making comments that make her seem excited and apprehensive; when she sees that Booth is happy with the news, she also seems overjoyed. This reflects her earlier desire to become a mother, circa season 4, as well as her desire that Booth be the father of the baby.

In the Season 8 episode "The Shot in the Dark", Brennan is shot while working in the lab late at night. While undergoing emergency surgery, she experiences a vision of meeting with her deceased mother, Christine Brennan. Initially dismissing this as a hallucination, Brennan experiences several more visions throughout the episode. During these discussions, it is revealed that Brennan's hyper-rationalization originates from the very last piece of advice her mother gave to her (before going on the run) which was to use her brain instead of her heart. While that advice enabled Brennan to survive all these years, the vision of her mother explains, it's now time for Brennan to do more than just survive.

Since entering a relationship with and marrying Booth and then having children, the character has undergone development personally and is shown to be a caring wife and protective mother. She would often put aside her own atheism and uses her hyper-rationality to justify Booth's religious beliefs, as shown in season 8 where she references the Bible in order to persuade Booth to forgive his mother and in the season finale where she agrees to a church wedding, rationalizing that she could appreciate the "beauty" of the ceremony and its significance to Booth. She also showed concern in Season 10 about Booth's change in demeanor following his release from prison and exoneration, noting that he had not attended mass for some time.

== Relationships ==
FBI psychologist Lance Sweets postulates in a number of episodes that Brennan's apprehension over having relationships is largely due in part to the abandonment and abuse she experienced as a teenager after her parents disappeared. It is said that she "hides" herself behind a front of hyper-rationalism and she always keeps people at arms' length, except for those closest to her - namely Booth and Angela, but she does become more comfortable confiding in others, including Sweets, Hodgins, Cam, and her father.

=== Romantic ===
Brennan has had a number of relatively short relationships, including an ill-fated date with a man who turned out to be a murderer and the re-kindling of a romance with her former thesis supervisor. In the series' pilot episode, she has stated that although she does not always feel the need for a committed emotional relationship, she has engaged in casual relationships to "satisfy biological urges". In one episode, she was spending time with two men, one for his intelligence and the other for his sexual prowess. In Season 5, episode "The Plain in the Prodigy", she tells Booth she lost her virginity at the age of 22. When he asks her why she waited so long, she says that the decision was "important to her". After much character growth, Temperance Brennan is now married to her partner Seeley Booth, and they have a daughter and a son together.

==== Seeley Booth ====
At the start of the series, FBI Special Agent Seeley Booth is Brennan's partner, and the principal liaison between the Jeffersonian and law enforcement agencies. He is also Brennan's principal love interest throughout the series, with the two marrying and having children by the end of the series. Although his working style initially clashes with Brennan's, they have since become full-fledged partners. Their compatibility has become one of the central points of the show, with many new characters mistaking them for a couple and co-workers, especially Angela, constantly speculating that they are "more than partners". Booth and Brennan have repeatedly risked their safety to save each other, including when Booth took a bullet meant for Brennan. After Booth rescues Brennan from the corrupt Agent Jamie Kenton (Adam Baldwin), Booth lifts her off the hook she is hanging on by putting her tied hands around his neck, even though he himself is severely injured. In "Two Bodies in the Lab", in season 1, and in "The Rocker in the Rinse Cycle", in season 5, Brennan and Booth's mutual love for the Foreigner song "Hot Blooded" is mentioned; Booth even refers to it as "our song" in "The Rocker in the Rinse Cycle". Brennan once comments to Wyatt that she "[couldn't] think of anything [she] wouldn't do to help Booth."

Initially Brennan is mostly dismissive of Booth due to their opposing worldviews and work styles – which is a source of friction and banter between them. Although she refuses to admit it at first, Brennan enjoys working with him from the beginning, even after they have a brief falling out after Booth gets her drunk and "fires" her. In Season 1, she cajoles him into launching an investigation after finding three bone fragments on a golf course so he can work with the Jeffersonian team on the case, despite the fact that the FBI technically has no jurisdiction. She often unknowingly offends him on a number of occasions during the first few seasons with her tactlessness, only realizing after being gently admonished by Angela or another member of the team. She comes to admire his ability to connect with people and read behavioral cues when interrogating suspects after coming to terms with her own lack of social skills. After finding out about his abusive childhood and haunted past in the Army, she also begins to respect him as a person. Booth, who is particularly taciturn in revealing emotions or speaking about his past, begins to open up to and confide in her. Since entering a relationship with (and eventually marrying) Booth, she is shown to be extremely supportive of him, even at the expense of her friendship with Angela. Additionally, she put aside her own misgivings several times for Booth's benefit; for example, she agrees to have Christine christened into the Catholic Church and references the Bible when trying to convince Booth to forgive his mother. In later seasons she is shown to be very protective of him and has inflicted physical pain on suspects who have harmed him, as seen in the season 11 episode "The Brother in the Basement" where she barges into the interrogation room and demands the suspect tell Agent James Aubrey (Philip Aubrey) where Booth is. She also punches a misogynistic suspect in "The Murder of the Meninist" to prevent an already irate Booth from doing so, which would have cost him his job. During their brief separation in season 10 due to the relapse of his gambling addiction, she also refuses to criticize him in front of her colleagues or Aubrey.

Brennan acquires the nickname "Bones" from Booth. She initially dislikes it, but comes to regard it with affection. Booth and his son Parker are the only characters in the show she permits to use it and the former rarely addresses her by her first name or "Tempe".

In Season 2 Brennan shoots and kills a person for the first time while working on a string of murders connected to serial killer Howard Epps (Heath Freeman). She is forced to pull the trigger after Epps' accomplice attacks and injures Booth with a pipe. At the end of the episode she confides in Booth of her conflicted feelings and finds comfort in the fact that Booth understands how she feels.

When Brennan decides that she wants to have a baby, she asks Booth to be the sperm donor. He agrees to Brennan's request at first, but subsequently struggles with the thought of not being involved in the life of his prospective child. Eventually he tells Brennan he cannot let her have his child if he is not allowed to be a father to it. Soon thereafter, it is discovered that he has a (benign) brain tumor. He has to undergo surgery, and though the surgery is successful, a poor reaction to anesthesia puts him in a coma for several days. While in his coma, Brennan reads to him from her new novel, and he has an elaborate dream in which Brennan is his wife and that she is pregnant, and that the staff at the Jeffersonian play the characters in the novel. When he awakens, he initially suffers from amnesia, not recognizing Brennan.

Although for the majority of the series Booth and Brennan deny that their relationship is anything more than friendly professionalism, they admit to their colleague Dr. Lance Sweets (John Francis Daley) that they kissed and nearly spent the night together after their very first case together. After this discussion, Booth attempts to convince Brennan to give a relationship a try. However, she declines, telling him that she, unlike him, is not a gambler, and isn't able to take that kind of a chance. They subsequently attempt to date other people, although the fact that Booth once comments that he regards Brennan as his "standard" for other women suggests that he, at least, has not completely moved on. Brennan does admit to Angela that as time has gone on, she is unsure if she wants to keep doing consulting work for the FBI, as she is constantly worried that something will happen to Booth and she will be unable to save him. In the climax of Season Five, Brennan and Booth part ways for a year – he goes to Afghanistan while she leaves for the Maluku Islands in Indonesia – but they promise to meet, one year from that day, at the Lincoln Memorial.

In the beginning of season six (seven months later), Booth returns from Afghanistan to help save Cam's job. Booth has a serious new girlfriend, Hannah Burley, and despite the hints of her colleagues at Brennan's unconscious jealousy of their relationship, she vehemently denies feeling uncomfortable with the new situation. Through subsequent episodes her jealousy and resentfulness become apparent as Hannah and Booth start becoming more serious. Although Brennan reveals via her vows on her wedding day ("The Woman in White") that she has been in love with Booth at least since she and Hodgins were buried alive ("Aliens in a Spaceship"), it is in the episode "The Doctor in the Photo" that she conveys her love to Booth and that she wants to be with him, but she is let down when Booth says that he loves Hannah. This prompts Brennan to conclude that she has missed her chance, later reflecting that she should move on. In episode 10 of the sixth season, "The Body in the Bag", Booth tells his girlfriend about the incident, stating that it (his love for Brennan) was all in the past and whatever he felt, he does not feel it anymore. However it is made clear in the following episode that he still has feelings for Brennan.

Despite her apparent resolve to move on, Brennan is saddened when her father noted that he always thought she and Booth would end up together. During a subsequent case involving a polygamist who would spend the night with his first wife on the night he was scheduled to sleep alone, Booth comments that, while you can love several people, there is only ever one person you love the most. Brennan asks him what happens when you push that person away, and he replies that it never truly leaves, adding further weight to the implication that he still has feelings for Brennan. Following Hannah's departure, the two begin to reconnect, to the point that, during a case that sees the two trapped in an elevator during a blackout for several hours, Booth and Brennan admit that they are each interested in a relationship but require more time to sort out their own feelings before they make such a commitment.

In episode 22 of season 6, "The Hole in the Heart", in which Vincent Nigel-Murray (Ryan Cartwright), Brennan's favorite intern, is murdered by renegade sniper Jacob Broadsky (Arnold Vosloo), Booth has Brennan stay at his apartment for her safety. Later that night, Brennan, still overcome with shock and grief over Vincent's death, goes into Booth's bedroom; they talk about the events of that day, and then she allows Booth to hold her in bed. It is implied in the following day that they had sex. In the last scene of the season 6 finale, "The Change in the Game", after the birth of Angela and Hodgins' son, Brennan tells Booth that she is pregnant and that he is the father.

At the start of Season 7, a very pregnant Brennan and Booth are a couple, but are going back and forth between apartments. Booth suggests that they should have their own place, whereas Brennan wants Booth to move into her apartment. It causes a minor rift between them, but is resolved when Booth admits why he wants to move into a new house and Brennan having some time to think over it says it is a good idea because she would need him practically, emotionally and sexually. In episode 6, "The Crack in the Code," they decide to buy a two-story house in the suburbs—which they jokingly called "The Mighty Hut"—that Booth found at a police auction and renovate it, (according to a mailed check sent to Brennan in "The Heiress in the Hill", in season 9, the "Mighty Hut"'s address is "1297 Janus Street, Washington DC, 20002"). In episode 7, "The Prisoner in the Pipe", Brennan goes into labor inside a prison just as she discovers who killed in an inmate there and Booth rushes her out with the intention to take her to the nearest hospital, but they both know she won't make it in time. This leads them to driving to an inn close to the prison. At first, they are rejected and are told to leave, but after some desperate pleading from an agonized Brennan, the two of them are led to a stall where she gives birth to their daughter, Christine Angela Booth (named after Temperance's mother, Christine Brennan, and Angela). Some time after the delivery, Temperance and Seeley both go back to their home where they celebrate with their friends from the Jeffersonian, who bring food and baby supplies. In "The Past in the Present", Brennan becomes the prime suspect in the murder of her schizophrenic friend, Ethan Sawyer, after supposedly threatening to kill Christine. Max advises Brennan to go into hiding, but she and Booth do not follow up at this suggestion. However, at the end of the episode, after Christine is christened, it is revealed Brennan decided to take her father's advice and flee with her daughter until her name is cleared. Just before Brennan flees town with Christine, she tells Booth she loves him. After she is cleared of Sawyer's murder, Brennan, Booth and Christine resume their family life.

The family reunite in the Season 8 premiere, and by the second episode, Bones and Christine have returned home. The couple have some difficulty readjusting after nearly three months apart with almost no contact with one another. Booth puts up a cheerful front, but is still resentful and bitter over the separation. They resolve their differences by the end of the episode.

At the end of Season 8, Brennan finally decides to marry Booth. However, their plans are ruined when Pelant blackmails Booth, threatening to kill five random people if Booth marries Brennan. Booth calls off the wedding but does not explain the real reason to Brennan. Brennan is devastated, but accepts his decision. In the season 9 premiere, Brennan fears that since Booth turned down her proposal, the love from their life is fading. After talking with bartender Aldo Clemens (Mather Zickel), a former priest and Army chaplain Booth confessed to, she realizes that it was uncharacteristic for Booth to suddenly cancel the wedding as he believed in marriage and he likely had a legitimate reason to do so. Despite her colleagues' anger at Booth, she decides to stay with him, telling him that she understands that he has his reasons and has faith that he will resolve the issue. In episode 4, "The Sense in the Sacrifice", after Booth singlehandedly tracks Pelant down through an abandoned building and kills him with a single gunshot, he reveals to her that Pelant had blackmailed him. Pelant had threatened to kill five innocent people if Booth continued with the wedding or went to the police or FBI. At the end of the episode he proposes and she happily accepts; unknown to them, Caroline, Angela and Hodgins witnessed it via the security cameras. In "The Woman in White", Booth and Brennan marry at a small garden ceremony outside the Jeffersonian.

==== Tim "Sully" Sullivan ====
Brennan had a brief relationship with FBI Agent Tim Sullivan, whom she met while on a case when Booth was in therapy due to his grief-induced rage over his self-perceived role in the death of serial killer Howard Epps. Sully asks Brennan out on a date after their case is completed, and they begin a relationship. Their relationship ends, however, when Sully decides to sail a boat down to the Caribbean, and Brennan declines to leave the Jeffersonian to go with him despite Angela trying to persuade her to follow him; Wyatt speculates that this is due to Brennan being unable to live a life without purpose. Despite Wyatt's original perception as to why she stayed, there exists strong indications, especially through Angela's observations of the situation, that the real reason she stayed is because of Booth.
