= Bones season 7 =

Bones
- Season 7
- Season 7 DVD cover art
- No. of episodes: 13

Release
- Original network: Fox
- Original release: November 3, 2011 – May 14, 2012

Season chronology
- ← Previous; Season 6 Next → Season 8

The seventh season of the American television series Bones premiered on November 3, 2011, and concluded on May 14, 2012, on Fox. The show maintained its previous time slot, airing on Thursdays at 9:00 pm ET for the first half of the season. It began airing on Mondays at 8:00 pm when it returned on April 2, 2012. The season contains a reduced order of 13 episodes to accommodate Emily Deschanel's pregnancy. Fox ordered an additional four episodes, that were produced during the seventh season, but aired during the first part of season eight.

== Cast and characters ==
=== Main cast ===
- Emily Deschanel as Dr. Temperance "Bones" Brennan, a forensic anthropologist
- David Boreanaz as FBI Special Agent Seeley Booth, who is the official FBI liaison with the Jeffersonian
- Michaela Conlin as Angela Montenegro, a forensic artist and wife of Jack Hodgins
- Tamara Taylor as Dr. Camille Saroyan, a forensic pathologist and the head of the forensic division
- T. J. Thyne as Dr. Jack Hodgins, an entomologist and husband of Angela Montenegro
- John Francis Daley as Dr. Lance Sweets, an FBI psychologist, who provides psychological reports on criminals and staff including Brennan and Booth

=== Recurring cast ===
- Patricia Belcher as Caroline Julian, a District attorney prosecutor that often works with the team
- Andrew Leeds as Christopher Pelant, this season's recurring 'tech-savvy' antagonist
- Tina Majorino as Special Agent Genevieve Shaw
- Ryan O'Neal as Max Keenan, Brennan's father
- Reed Diamond as Hayes Flynn, an FBI special agent
- Billy Gibbons as Angela's father
- Tiffany Hines as Michelle Welton, Cam's adopted daughter
- Ty Panitz as Parker Booth, Booth's son
- Ralph Waite as Hank Booth, Seeley's grandfather

Interns

- Carla Gallo as Daisy Wick
- Michael Grant Terry as Wendell Bray
- Eugene Byrd as Dr. Clark Edison
- Luke Kleintank as Finn Abernathy
- Joel David Moore as Colin Fisher
- Pej Vahdat as Arastoo Vaziri

== Episodes ==
The season is truncated due to Emily Deschanel's pregnancy and maternity leave. Originally, six episodes were scheduled to air in 2011 before the series went on hiatus, but the sixth episode was postponed to January 12, 2012, with the series then going on hiatus until the spring. The season begins a few months after the end of the previous season with Brennan in her third trimester. The season also introduces a new recurring antagonist, whom executive producer Stephen Nathan describes as "more of a 21st-century, tech-savvy foe" compared to the series' past recurring antagonists. The first six episodes also deal with Booth and Brennan preparing to raise their child.

No. overall	No. in season	Title	Directed by	Written by	Original release date	Prod. code	US viewers (millions)
130	1	"The Memories in the Shallow Grave"	Ian Toynton	Stephen Nathan	November 3, 2011	7AKY01	10.00
The Jeffersonian team work on a case where the victim's body was found in a paintball field, but later discover from the victim's husband that she suffered from amnesia. Meanwhile, Brennan and Booth adjust to their new life as a couple living together, and deal with Brennan's pregnancy.
131	2	"The Hot Dog in the Competition"	Dwight Little	Michael Peterson	November 10, 2011	7AKY02	8.64
The remains of a competitive eating champion are discovered days before the next major competition where $10,000 is the prize, leaving the victim's competitors as suspects. A new intern, Finn Abernathy, joins the Jeffersonian but his troubled past is a cause for concern for Cam on deciding if he should keep his job or not. Meanwhile, Booth is upset when he learns that Brennan learned the sex of the baby without him.
132	3	"The Prince in the Plastic"	Alex Chapple	Dean Lopata	November 17, 2011	7AKY03	8.76
The team investigates a crime in which a female toy company executive is found shrink-wrapped with one of the company's popular dolls. Meanwhile, Sweets prepares for his gun certification test, even though Booth believes he should not carry a weapon. Also, Brennan learns the importance of playing with her child from Angela, who is trying to put together a toy for her child.
133	4	"The Male in the Mail"	Kevin Hooks	Pat Charles	December 1, 2011	7AKY04	8.91
The dismembered remains of a shipping and printing shop employee are found in several mailing boxes, leading Booth and Brennan to investigate the other employees, which includes a complicated love triangle with the victim. Booth's grandfather, who raised him and his brother, returns to break the news that Booth's father has died, leaving Booth to deal with his anger towards his father who was never there for him.
134	5	"The Twist in the Twister"	Jeannot Szwarc	Karine Rosenthal	December 8, 2011	7AKY05	8.11
The team investigates the death of a storm chaser whose body was hit by a tornado. Meanwhile, Brennan feels Booth is being too protective of her. Angela and Hodgins deal with a lack of sleep due to their baby, while Angela's dad visits wanting to babysit Michael, much to their dismay.
135	6	"The Crack in the Code"	Ian Toynton	Carla Kettner	January 12, 2012	7AKY06	8.64
The team investigates when a skull and spinal column, plus a taunting message in human blood, is found at a national museum. The only clue is a coded message in the vertebrae, which begins a hunt for a new, obviously technologically-proficient foe. Booth and Brennan are still looking for a new home.
136	7	"The Prisoner in the Pipe"	Kate Woods	Jonathan Collier	April 2, 2012	7AKY07	8.39
The remains of an escaped convict are found in a residential sewer, but an examination of the sewer pipes indicates that the murder occurred within prison walls. Brennan insists on solving the crime – despite Booth's pleas for her not to overexert herself – and the expectant couple experiences a very untraditional arrival of their baby daughter.
137	8	"The Bump in the Road"	Dwight Little	Keith Foglesong	April 9, 2012	7AKY08	7.56
With the help of Special Agent Genny Shaw (Tina Majorino), the Jeffersonian team identifies the remains of a discount shopper and "extreme couponer" who was dragged along the road by an 18-wheeler. Brennan is adjusting to her first day back at work after giving birth, and Cam disapproves of her daughter's romance with intern Finn Abernathy (Luke Kleintank).
138	9	"The Don't in the Do"	Jeannot Szwarc	Janet Lin	April 16, 2012	7AKY09	7.15
When a corpse is found at a landfill, dyed in a blue substance, intern Arastoo Vaziri (Pej Vahdat) discovers a method that helps eliminate postmortem damages to the corpse, which leads the team back to a hair salon where the victim worked. Brennan is feeling uncomfortable in her post-baby body, so Booth decides to do something special to boost her self-confidence.
139	10	"The Warrior in the Wuss"	Chad Lowe	Dean Lopata & Michael Peterson	April 23, 2012	7AKY10	7.38
Booth and Brennan investigate the murder of a truck company employee who is found in the middle of the woods. After the victim's son is questioned, Booth and Brennan visit his karate class in search of a motive. Back at the lab, Hodgins is going overboard purchasing lab equipment. Booth's son Parker returns from England and Brennan is apprehensive about how he'll react to his new baby sister.
140	11	"The Family in the Feud"	Dwight Little	Pat Charles & Janet Lin	April 30, 2012	7AKY11	7.16
When a corpse is found in the middle of the woods, the team find themselves in the middle of a modern-day Hatfield-McCoy style feud. Brennan and Booth interrogate a family member with a shocking confession that leads them to a motive for the victim's murder. Brennan has a difficult time accepting her father's (Ryan O'Neal) offer to babysit their infant daughter because of his unpredictable presence in her own childhood.
141	12	"The Suit on the Set"	Emile Levisetti	Karine Rosenthal	May 7, 2012	7AKY12	7.02
Brennan and Booth head out to Los Angeles to consult on the production of "Bone of Contention," a film based on Brennan's latest book and the work of the Jeffersonian team. While on set, Brennan intervenes after finding flaws with the actors' performances, not to mention the film's total disregard for science. Then she discovers that the prop cadaver being used is an actual murder victim, leading her and Booth to launch an investigation that has real-world consequences in the land of make-believe. Booth is offered a job on the studio lot, and embarrassing information is revealed about Cam's past.
142	13	"The Past in the Present"	David Boreanaz	Carla Kettner	May 14, 2012	7AKY16	7.21
Evil tech genius Christopher Pelant (Andrew Leeds), a suspect in a previous case Brennan and Booth handled (The Crack in the Code), is seen before the parole board petitioning for release. Brennan and Booth inform the parole board that he is a suspect in two murder cases. Then Brennan and Booth are called to the scene of a new murder. After determining the victim is Brennan's friend, who also is linked to Pelant, the Jeffersonian team works to prove Pelant is guilty; but when law enforcement examines the team's findings, key pieces of evidence are tied to Brennan and suspicion falls on her. Knowing she will soon be arrested, her father arranges for Brennan and her daughter to go on the run so the team can clear Brennan and find the evidence to arrest Pelant once and for all.

=== Crossovers with The Finder ===
The Bones spin-off series The Finder, which aired its backdoor pilot episode as part of Bones' sixth season, premiered on January 12, 2012. The Finder aired 7 of its 13-episode season in Bones' time slot when it went on hiatus during January–March 2012, before The Finder moved to Fridays. Bones cast members John Francis Daley and T. J. Thyne, who portray Lance Sweets and Jack Hodgins, respectively, appeared in different episodes of The Finder. Also, David Boreanaz directed an episode of The Finder.

== DVD and Blu-ray release ==
The seventh season of Bones was released on DVD and Blu-ray in region 1 on October 9, 2012, in region 2 on October 1, 2012 and in region 4 on November 7, 2012. The set includes all 13 episodes of season seven on a 4-disc DVD set and 3-disc Blu-ray set presented in anamorphic widescreen. Special features include an audio commentary on "The Past in the Present" by Hart Hanson and Ian Toynton, deleted scenes from "The Memories in the Shallow Grave" and "The Past in the Present", a gag reel, and two featurettes—Creating "The Suit on the Set" and Bone of Contention: On the Red Carpet.
