= Bones season 6 =

Bones
- Season 6
- Season 6 DVD cover art
- No. of episodes: 23

Release
- Original network: Fox
- Original release: September 23, 2010 – May 19, 2011

Season chronology
- ← Previous; Season 5 Next → Season 7

The sixth season of the American television series Bones premiered on September 23, 2010, and concluded on May 19, 2011, on Fox. The show maintained its previous time slot, airing on Thursdays at 8:00 pm ET, then moved to Thursdays at 9:00 pm ET in 2011. The season consisted of 23 episodes and introduced a spin-off series, The Finder, in the 19th episode of the season which has the same name.

== Cast and characters ==
=== Main cast ===
- Emily Deschanel as Dr. Temperance "Bones" Brennan, a forensic anthropologist
- David Boreanaz as FBI Special Agent Seeley Booth, who is the official FBI liaison with the Jeffersonian
- Michaela Conlin as Angela Montenegro, a forensic artist and wife of Jack Hodgins
- Tamara Taylor as Dr. Camille "Cam" Saroyan, a forensic pathologist and the head of the forensic division
- T. J. Thyne as Dr. Jack Hodgins, an entomologist and husband of Angela Montenegro
- John Francis Daley as Dr. Lance Sweets, an FBI psychologist, who provides psychological reports on criminals and staff including Brennan and Booth

=== Recurring cast ===
- Patricia Belcher as Caroline Julian, a prosecutor
- Ryan O'Neal as Max Keenan, Brennan's father
- Ty Panitz as Parker Booth, Booth's son
- Katheryn Winnick as Hannah Burley, a journalist and Booth's girlfriend
- Arnold Vosloo as Jacob Broadsky, a professional sniper who was Booth's friend
- Elon Gold as Dr. Paul Lidner, Cam's boyfriend
- Tiffany Hines as Michelle Welton, Cam's adopted daughter
- Billy Gibbons as "himself", Angela's father
- Deirdre Lovejoy as Heather Taffet
- Scott Lowell as Dr. Douglas Filmore, a Canadian podiatrist
- Tina Majorino as Special Agent Genevieve Shaw

Interns

- Michael Grant Terry as Wendell Bray
- Ryan Cartwright as Vincent Nigel-Murray
- Eugene Byrd as Dr. Clark Edison
- Carla Gallo as Daisy Wick
- Joel David Moore as Colin Fisher
- Pej Vahdat as Arastoo Vaziri

== Production ==
Storylines for the sixth season include the final return of Heather Taffet, aka the Gravedigger (Deirdre Lovejoy), as well as the introduction of a new recurring antagonist, sniper named Jacob Broadsky (portrayed by Arnold Vosloo). David Boreanaz directed episodes 11 (produced as 10) and 16 of this season.

Emily Deschanel was originally scheduled to make her directorial debut with episode 14 of this season, a Valentine's Day wedding episode, but this was postponed due to episodes 13 and 14 airing during February sweeps when Brennan's character would have had an unfavorably smaller presence, as Deschanel would have had to be prepping to direct her episode. Deschanel did not end up directing an episode due to scheduling conflicts, and though she planned on directing an episode in the next season, she did not direct until six years later, on season 12's "The Hope in the Horror".

After dropping the idea of a black-and-white episode the previous season, creator Hart Hanson revealed the "out of the box" episode this season would be a story shown completely from Brennan's point of view after she identifies with a victim who resembles her, "meaning we will see the world the way she sees it. We hope this will give a little insight into how Brennan perceives all around her".

Intern Vincent Nigel-Murray Ryan Cartwright, introduced as a recurring character in season four, was killed off in the penultimate episode of this season, shot by sniper Jacob Broadsky. Series creator Hart Hanson explained the reasoning for this decision was due to the television series Alphas being picked up, in which Cartwright is a series regular. Hanson explained, "We knew [his exit] would happen before the end of this season, so the story has been in the works for a while. We knew that one of our squints, who are [played by] very, very talented actors, would get a job". Hanson also explained that, "He's a well-beloved character... probably the favorite squint of the audience, so we decided to kill him for the heartbreak".

Episode 4 features the character Professor Bunsen Jude "The Science Dude", which is inspired by real-life person Bill Nye "the Science Guy", having a similar name and a children's science show.

== Spin-off series ==
In October 2010, it was revealed that Fox was developing a potential spin-off series that would be built around a new recurring character that would be introduced in the sixth season. The potential spin-off series would also be created by Bones creator/executive producer Hart Hanson, and be based on The Locator series of two books written by Richard Greener. The character of Walter is described as an eccentric but amusing recluse in high demand for his ability to find anything. He is skeptical of everything—he suffered brain damage while overseas, which explains his constant paranoia—and known for asking offensive, seemingly irrelevant questions to get to the truth. Production on the episode was scheduled to begin in December 2010, but was delayed to early 2011 due to creative differences.

Creator Hart Hanson posted on Twitter (in a humorous manner) regarding the notes he got from the network, "I received studio notes on the Bones spin-off idea. They want it to be better. Unreasonable taskmasters. Impossible dreamers. Neo-platonists." During Fox's TCA press tour, executive producer Stephen Nathan revealed production on the episode featuring The Locator began in February 2011, with the episode airing in April.

In the episode, Booth and Brennan travel to Key West, Florida, where the spin-off is said to take place. Nathan went on to say regarding the casting of character, "You want to find people you want to see every single week do one unique character. That's why when you have Hugh Laurie, who is essentially playing a very unlikable character, you love to see him. And that is a rare, rare quality to find. And the finder won't be an unlikeable character, but because it is a unique character, it's difficult to find just the right person." Geoff Stults was cast as the lead character with Michael Clarke Duncan and Saffron Burrows cast as the other two lead characters. The three characters were introduced in episode 19 of the sixth season.

The Finder was picked up for the 2011–12 season on May 10, 2011, with an order of 13 episodes. It was later cancelled on May 9, 2012.

== Episodes ==
No. overall	No. in season	Title	Directed by	Written by	Original release date	Prod. code	US viewers (millions)
107	1	"The Mastodon in the Room"	Ian Toynton	Hart Hanson	September 23, 2010	6AKY01	9.79
Seven months have passed and Caroline Julian calls the team back to the Jeffersonian in Washington, D.C. to help save Cam's career as they work to help solve a controversial case regarding the remains of a young boy.
108	2	"The Couple in the Cave"	Milan Cheylov	Stephen Nathan	September 30, 2010	6AKY02	9.75
The team works on trying to discover the identities of a couple whose bodies were found in a cave. Booth's war correspondent girlfriend, Hannah Burley, returns to Washington, D.C. and Brennan re-evaluates her relationship with him after realizing he's genuinely happy with Hannah.
109	3	"The Maggots in the Meathead"	Tim Southam	Dean Lopata	October 7, 2010	6AKY03	9.24
Booth and Brennan investigate the remains of Richie "The V" Genaro, who was last seen partying in a Jersey Shore nightclub. Brennan's pop culture knowledge is tested when she believes she watched a documentary about the people in Jersey Shore, but it was actually a reality show. Meanwhile, Hannah makes friends with the Jeffersonian team and Angela tries to keep her pregnancy a secret.
110	4	"The Body and the Bounty"	Dwight Little	Michael Peterson	October 14, 2010	6AKY04	9.58
The team goes on a search for missing body parts after they find a decomposing skull and hands in a dumpster. After the victim is identified as a bounty hunter who was searching for a killer named Charles Braverman, the team discovers that someone else is also looking for Braverman, resulting in a chase with an unexpected suspect. Meanwhile, Brennan makes children's show star Professor Bunsen Jude "The Science Dude" (guest star David Alan Grier) her new intern.
111	5	"The Bones That Weren't"	Jeannot Szwarc	Pat Charles	November 4, 2010	6AKY05	9.26
A ballet dancer is murdered and Booth and Brennan are led to suspect a group of street dancers in the crime. Meanwhile, Booth's girlfriend Hannah is shot, leading Booth to worry about her health.
112	6	"The Shallow in the Deep"	Mark Helfrich	Carla Kettner	November 11, 2010	6AKY06	9.20
The team is tasked with identifying the skeletal remains of the Amalia Rose, a 150-year-old slave ship found off the coast of Maryland. It turns into a murder investigation when they discover that some of the bones are from a much more recently deceased person. Sweets has trouble keeping a platonic relationship with Daisy and has to make a decision while Cam finds a personal connection to the slave ship.
113	7	"The Babe in the Bar"	Tim Southam	Karine Rosenthal	November 18, 2010	6AKY07	9.40
When human remains are found inside the world's largest chocolate bar, an eccentric candy mogul (Wayne Knight) falls under suspicion. The team investigates the puzzling way the remains got there. Meanwhile, Cam is worried about what college Michelle attends and Hodgins plans a party to reveal Angela's pregnancy, even though everybody already knows.
114	8	"The Twisted Bones in the Melted Truck"	Gordon C. Lonsdale	Josh Berman	December 2, 2010	6AKY09	8.83
A burnt corpse found in a truck leads Brennan and Booth to a local high school where the victim's wife works as a teacher and they find evidence of an illicit relationship between her and one of her students. Meanwhile, Hannah tries to form a bond with Booth's son and Sweets helps Daisy with a government psychological exam.
115	9	"The Doctor in the Photo"	Ian Toynton	Carla Kettner	December 9, 2010	6AKY08	8.36
Brennan discovers the body of a surgeon found in a tough neighborhood with multiple skull fractures, but no indication of why or how she got there. Brennan begins to identify with the victim after learning more about her past. The case leads her to retrace the victim's final steps to help solve the case. She also makes a discovery about herself and learns a lesson about taking chances with the help of a Jeffersonian security guard, Micah Leggat (Enrico Colantoni).
116	10	"The Body in the Bag"	Kate Woods	Janet Lin	January 20, 2011	6AKY11	10.55
Hannah discovers Brennan and Booth's past and starts avoiding Brennan, pushing Brennan to confront her. A case involving a liquid explosion of human remains causes Brennan, Booth, and Cam to become covered in evidence. Sweets believes Booth still has feelings for Brennan. Hodgins and Angela begin to talk about their future including where they want to raise their family.
117	11	"The Bullet in the Brain"	David Boreanaz	Karyn Usher	January 27, 2011	6AKY10	12.05
Heather Taffet aka "The Gravedigger" (Deirdre Lovejoy) faces her final appeal before being sentenced to death. While being escorted to the courthouse, she is shot and decapitated by an unknown sniper. Initially Bones' father Max (Ryan O'Neal) is listed as a suspect due to his criminal tendencies, but when the team discovers that it was a professional hit, Booth, a former Army sniper, is forced to question an old Army colleague. Sweets deals with the aftermath of the shooting, due in part to his close proximity to her when she was killed, but also due to what Taffet had said to him about being a "weak link." Booth eventually discovers the shooter is Jacob Broadsky (Arnold Vosloo), a professional sniper and mentor whom he once knew. The case gets personal when he discovers that Broadsky purchased land using his name.
118	12	"The Sin in the Sisterhood"	Rob Hardy	Karyn Usher	February 3, 2011	6AKY12	10.20
Booth and Brennan investigate the death of a man who was found in a cornfield. The man was a polygamist, married to three women, who are also sisters. Cam believes her relationship with her boyfriend (played by Elon Gold) is in trouble, so they try to make it a priority.
119	13	"The Daredevil in the Mold"	Dwight Little	Dean Lopata	February 10, 2011	6AKY13	9.94
The remains of a BMX rider are found on the roof of a warehouse after a failed stunt attempt. The team investigates the accident and determine that he was killed by blunt physical force, indicating he was murdered. Sweets asks Booth for advice as he plans on proposing to Daisy, while Booth proposes to Hannah showcasing his commitment. Hannah declines, saying she can't commit.
120	14	"The Bikini in the Soup"	Ian Toynton	Lyla Oliver	February 17, 2011	6AKY14	9.84
On Valentine's Day, the team investigates the liquefied remains of a wedding planner found in her home. Cam pressures the team to solve the case so she can spend time with her boyfriend to celebrate the holiday. Booth and Brennan both downplay the significance of Valentine's Day, while Hodgins plans a special day for Angela.
121	15	"The Killer in the Crosshairs"	Milan Cheylov	Michael Peterson	March 10, 2011	6AKY15	10.49
After successfully killing the Gravedigger, sniper Jacob Broadsky strikes again, killing a prior suspect who escaped the justice system. Booth uses his military training to try to stop Broadsky before he hits another intended target. Angela's father (Billy Gibbons) visits the Jeffersonian where he insists on being able to name his unborn grandchild, much to Hodgins' dismay.
122	16	"The Blackout in the Blizzard"	David Boreanaz	Karine Rosenthal	March 17, 2011	6AKY16	11.61
After a blizzard causes a citywide blackout, the team must think of creative ways to solve a murder case that could be connected to a possible viral outbreak of Crimean–Congo hemorrhagic fever (CCHF). Booth and Brennan are trapped inside the elevator in Booth's apartment during the blackout, with Sweets outside where he starts a touchy conversation concerning their relationship. Meanwhile, Angela and Hodgins receive troubling news that could affect their unborn child.
123	17	"The Feet on the Beach"	Emile Levisetti	Pat Charles	April 7, 2011	6AKY18	10.58
After a flood on the U.S.-Canada border, eight pairs of severed feet are discovered, with seven pairs being identified as research corpses from a nearby university body farm. Brennan is forced to work with Canadian forensic podiatrist Dr. Douglas Filmore (Scott Lowell) who she once humiliated publicly. Meanwhile, Cam continues to make college plans for her daughter, which her daughter may not like.
124	18	"The Truth in the Myth"	Chad Lowe	Jonathan Goldstein & John Francis Daley	April 14, 2011	6AKY19	11.45
The remains of a host of a mythbuster television show are found in the wilderness and appear as if he was killed by the mythic reptile-mammal hybrid known as the Chupacabra. The victim was attempting to debunk the myth. Meanwhile, Jeffersonian intern Vincent Nigel-Murray, who is a recovering alcoholic, makes amends as well as confessions to the team.
125	19	"The Finder"	Daniel Sackheim	Hart Hanson	April 21, 2011	6AKY17	10.96
The remains of a maritime museum security guard are found in the Florida Everglades, after attempting to steal an 18th-century nautical chart fragment which is used to discover treasures. To help solve the crime, Booth gets the help of Walter Sherman (Geoff Stults), a former U.S. soldier and Iraq war veteran, who has the ability to unearth anything. Along with Sherman, they are also assisted by his colleagues, Ike Latulippe (Saffron Burrows) and Leo Knox (Michael Clarke Duncan). During the case, Brennan tests Sherman's skills, while Booth has cold feelings about his former military comrade.
126	20	"The Pinocchio in the Planter"	François Velle	Keith Foglesong	April 28, 2011	6AKY20	9.70
The team investigates the murder of an ad man whose remains were found on a community center playground. After investigating, they learn the victim burned bridges by having an aggressive attitude and by being brutally honest. Meanwhile, the team tries to be more honest in their relationships and Angela has Hodgins face the reality of their pregnancy.
127	21	"The Signs in the Silence"	Dwight Little	Janet Lin & Stephen Nathan	May 5, 2011	6AKY21	10.94
The team believes a 15-year-old Jane Doe, who is deaf and refuses to communicate, potentially committed murder. She was found covered in blood and holding a knife. Meanwhile, Hodgins is unaware of details regarding Angela's pregnancy, because Angela has kept them from him. Bones struggles with her inability to convey emotion after Sweets talks her out of using force to get answers from the suspected murderer.
128	22	"The Hole in the Heart"	Alex Chapple	Teleplay by : Carla Kettner & Karyn Usher; Story by : Carla Kettner	May 12, 2011	6AKY22	10.48
Booth and the Jeffersonian Institute team continue to search for Jacob Broadsky, whose more recent phone call to Booth suggests he intends to go after Booth's team. Booth finds another body on a piece of land where Broadsky was believed to have been; Broadsky has killed a former fellow sniper and taken his rifle. While examining the body, Broadsky kills Vincent Nigel-Murray, though the intended target was Booth. As the rest of the team struggles with their colleague's death, Booth becomes more determined to catch Broadsky once and for all. Brennan spends the night at Booth's apartment and, in a later conversation with Angela, implies that she slept with him. At the lab, Hodgins deduces that the bullet has traces from a shipping port and that Broadsky could be hiding there. Meanwhile Booth faces off with his former mentor and is forced to use unorthodox methods to capture him. In the end the team honors Vincent by singing his favorite song, "Coconut" while taking his body to be sent to England.
129	23	"The Change in the Game"	Ian Toynton	Hart Hanson & Stephen Nathan	May 19, 2011	6AKY23	9.83
Some unidentifiable and gruesome remains were lodged in the pinsetter at a bowling lane and evidence suggests foul play. Booth and Brennan go undercover in a bowling league with the help of Brennan's father Max, who used to be in the victim's bowling team. Meanwhile, Angela works from the hospital via webcam as she comes closer to giving birth. The episode ends with Brennan telling Booth that she is pregnant and that he's the father of her unborn child.

== DVD and Blu-ray release ==
The sixth season of Bones was released on DVD and Blu-ray (subtitled "Cradle to Grave Edition") in region 1 on October 11, 2011, in region 2 on October 17, 2011 and in region 4 on November 9, 2011. The set includes all 23 episodes of season six on a 6-disc DVD set and 4-disc Blu-ray set presented in anamorphic widescreen. Special features include two audio commentaries—"The Doctor in the Photo" by executive producers Hart Hanson, Stephen Nathan and Ian Toynton and "The Blackout in the Blizzard" by actors David Boreanaz and Emily Deschanel. Featurettes include "Breaking Down: The Blackout in the Blizzard" and "The Visual Effects of Bones". Also included are extended versions of "The Daredevil in the Mold" and "The Bikini in the Soup", a gag reel, and the pilot episode of the television series The Killing.
