= Bones season 10 =

Bones
- Season 10
- Season 10 DVD cover art
- No. of episodes: 22

Release
- Original network: Fox
- Original release: September 25, 2014 – June 11, 2015

Season chronology
- ← Previous; Season 9 Next → Season 11

The tenth season of the American television series Bones premiered on September 25, 2014, and concluded on June 11, 2015, on Fox. The show moved time slots from its previous season, airing on Thursdays at 8:00 pm ET.

== Cast and characters ==
=== Main cast ===
- Emily Deschanel as Dr. Temperance "Bones" Brennan, a forensic anthropologist, and wife of Seeley Booth
- David Boreanaz as FBI Special Agent Seeley Booth, who is the official FBI liaison with the Jeffersonian, and husband of Temperance Brennan
- Michaela Conlin as Angela Montenegro, a forensic artist and wife of Jack Hodgins
- Tamara Taylor as Dr. Camille Saroyan, a forensic pathologist, the head of the forensic division
- T. J. Thyne as Dr. Jack Hodgins, an entomologist, mineralogist, palynologist, and forensic chemist, and husband of Angela Montenegro
- John Francis Daley as Dr. Lance Sweets, an FBI psychologist who provides psychological reports on criminals and staff including Brennan and Booth (Note: John Francis Daley only appears in the season premiere and is removed from the opening credits in the second episode. John Boyd guest stars in the season premiere and is then added to the opening credits beginning with the second episode.)
- John Boyd as James Aubrey, a junior FBI agent working under Booth

=== Recurring cast ===
- Sunnie Pelant as Christine Booth, Seeley and Temperance's daughter
- Patricia Belcher as Caroline Julian, a prosecutor who often works with the team
- Andrew Leeds as Christopher Pelant, a hacker
- Sterling Macer, Jr. as Victor Stark, the FBI Deputy Director
- Ryan O'Neal as Max Keenan, Brennan's father
- Sam Anderson as Hugo Sanderson, the owner of a powerful organization that may be the origin of the FBI conspiracy
- Michael Badalucco as Scott Starret, a previous Jeffersonian intern
- Billy Gibbons as Angela's father
- Cyndi Lauper as Avalon Harmonia, a psychic
- Danny Woodburn as Alex Radziwill, a Diplomatic immunity and State Department official
- Mather Zickel as Aldo Clemens, an ex-priest who counseled Booth when he was a sniper

Interns

- Carla Gallo as Daisy Wick
- Michael Grant Terry as Wendell Bray
- Eugene Byrd as Dr. Clark Edison
- Laura Spencer as Jessica Warren
- Pej Vahdat as Arastoo Vaziri
- Ignacio Serricchio as Rodolfo Fuentes
- Brian Klugman as Dr. Oliver Wells

== Production ==
The series was renewed for a tenth season on January 29, 2014. Series creator Hart Hanson stepped down as showrunner for the tenth season to focus on his new TV series, Backstrom; longtime executive producer and writer Stephan Nathan took over the role of showrunner. In January 2014, Fox Entertainment President Kevin Reilly commented that season 10 would possibly be the final season, but in July 2014, Fox chairman and CEO Peter Rice commented, "I hope it's not the last year ... it's a fantastic series, it's famously moved all over our schedule for 10 years ... It's [Emily Deschanel and David Boreanaz's] last year contractually, so we have to have that conversation ... but I hope that they will come back." The tenth season features the series' 200th episode, written by Stephen Nathan and directed by series star David Boreanaz, which is an Alfred Hitchcock homage set in the 1950s.

In July 2014, John Boyd was cast in a recurring role of James Aubrey, a junior FBI agent working under Booth. However, it was later revealed that Boyd would be a series regular. The character of Lance Sweets, portrayed by John Francis Daley who joined the cast in the third season, is killed off in the season premiere episode. The decision to kill off the character was because Daley needed a break from the series to direct the upcoming National Lampoon's Vacation remake, Vacation, and executive producer Stephan Nathan thought killing off the character instead of just writing him off would be more impactful. With the series' 206th episode, Bones became the longest-running one-hour drama for producing studio 20th Century Fox Television, and the episode also names all 206 bones in the human body. Emily Deschanel's real-life pregnancy was written into the show (like her first pregnancy), and the season features the reveal that Brennan is pregnant with her and Booth's second child. The season finale was written as a potential series finale, as it was written before the writers knew the series was renewed for another season.

== Episodes ==
No. overall	No. in season	Title	Directed by	Written by	Original release date	Prod. code	US viewers (millions)
191	1	"The Conspiracy in the Corpse"	Ian Toynton	Stephen Nathan & Jonathan Collier	September 25, 2014	AAKY01	6.34
The team attempt to find the identities of the people responsible for framing Booth and sending him to prison. Booth is introduced to his new junior agent James Aubrey (John Boyd). Near the end of the episode, Lance Sweets is killed in a parking garage as the conspiracy continues to grow, and the Jeffersonian team vows to solve the case and find out who killed him.
192	2	"The Lance to the Heart"	Dwight Little	Teleplay by : Nkechi Okoro Carroll & Keith Foglesong; Story by : Michael Peterson	October 2, 2014	AAKY02	6.41
As the team mourn the loss of Sweets, they must piece together the final clues in order to find the identity of his killer and thus another piece in the conspiracy that sent Booth to prison.
193	3	"The Purging of the Pundit"	Tim Southam	Michael Peterson	October 9, 2014	AAKY03	6.39
After a right-wing radio host's remains are found in a storm drain, the team narrow the list of suspects after learning about his surprising extracurricular activities, while Agent Aubrey and Brennan both express concern over Booth's state of mind.
194	4	"The Geek in the Guck"	Milan Cheylov	Gene Hong	October 16, 2014	AAKY04	6.56
A body dumped in a river proves to be a wealthy games designer with a history of manipulating others, leaving the team with no shortage of suspects. Meanwhile, Booth and Brennan begin to consider Christine's future.
195	5	"The Corpse at the Convention"	Chad Lowe	Dave Thomas	October 30, 2014	AAKY05	5.60
A forensic scientist convention becomes complicated when all the attendees want to help determine cause of death for a body found in a stairwell, with the subsequent investigation revealing that Hodgins is a potential suspect. Brennan encounters a rival after making a speech and Wendell returns with an update on his health.
196	6	"The Lost Love in the Foreign Land"	Allison Liddi-Brown	Emily Silver	November 6, 2014	AAKY06	5.64
The body of a murdered maid proves complicated when they discover that she was an undocumented immigrant, and Arastoo's preparation for his dissertation coincides with talk of marriage between him and Cam.
197	7	"The Money Maker on the Merry-Go-Round"	Michael Lange	Keith Foglesong	November 13, 2014	AAKY07	5.50
Aubrey is troubled by an emotional connection to the case of a murdered hedge-fund trader, and Booth and Brennan face a parental conflict over their contrasting reactions to Christine swearing for the first time.
198	8	"The Puzzler in the Pit"	Chad Lowe	Nkechi Okoro Carroll	November 20, 2014	AAKY08	5.26
The team is called in after a crossword puzzle master is discovered in an urban fracking site. Meanwhile, Daisy goes into labor.
199	9	"The Mutilation of the Master Manipulator"	Tim Southam	Hilary Weisman Graham	December 4, 2014	AAKY09	5.70
The team investigates the murder of a college professor. Wendell meets a girl during his clinical trial. Booth has to pass a driver's test after getting too many traffic tickets.
200	10	"The 200th in the 10th"	David Boreanaz	Stephen Nathan	December 11, 2014	AAKY10	5.49
In the 200th episode, Bones pays tribute to Alfred Hitchcock, by reimagining the Jeffersonian and FBI teams in 1950s Hollywood. Brennan is an LAPD detective fighting sexism, Booth is a jewel thief who is more complex than he seems.
201	11	"The Psychic in the Soup"	Jeannot Szwarc	Lena D. Waithe	March 26, 2015	AAKY11	5.84
The team investigate the death of a psychic whose body is found in a tree. They are assisted by Angela's psychic friend, Avalon Harmonia, however some of the team are skeptical regarding her having real psychic powers. Meanwhile, the team remember Sweets on what would have been his 30th birthday.
202	12	"The Teacher in the Books"	Anne Renton	Taylor Martin	April 2, 2015	AAKY12	4.74
The team investigate the death of a school teacher whose body is discovered in a bookstore. Meanwhile, Brennan joins Twitter as encouraged by her publisher to expand her fan base for her novels.
203	13	"The Baker in the Bits"	Michael Lange	Jonathan Collier	April 9, 2015	AAKY13	5.03
An ex-con's body is found in pieces after being blown up in a mine explosion, which leads the team to investigate a bakery which is known for hiring ex-felons. Meanwhile, Arastoo learns that his brother is dying from cancer, and must decide whether to return to Iran, his birth country from which he fled as a teenager.
204	14	"The Putter in the Rough"	Milan Cheylov	Dave Thomas	April 16, 2015	AAKY14	4.88
The team investigate the death of a professional mini-golfer. Brennan's father, Max, returns, however she becomes suspicious when he says he has to leave town. Meanwhile, Wendell has Hodgins assist him after he accidentally breaks a family heirloom of his girlfriend's.
205	15	"The Eye in the Sky"	Arlene Sanford	Gene Hong	April 23, 2015	AAKY15	4.65
When the remains of a high-stakes gambler are found in an industrial shredder, Booth goes undercover in an underground poker game, much to the dismay of Brennan, and risks relapsing into his gambling addiction. Meanwhile, Hodgins invents an unbreakable material which keeps glass from breaking when dropped, and Brennan and Booth find out they're expecting a second child. Later, Booth, affected by going undercover, breaks his gambling sobriety and makes a bet.
206	16	"The Big Beef at the Royal Diner"	Alex Chapple	Hilary Weisman Graham	April 30, 2015	AAKY16	4.29
The death of a TV celebrity chef leads Booth and Brennan to investigate the Royal Diner, a local restaurant the Jeffersonian team frequent for lunch every day. Meanwhile, Hodgins sells his invention for millions, and Cam receives word from Arastoo who is in Iran. Booth buys Brennan a golden necklace with the money he won from the bet, and Brennan becomes skeptical of his behavior when she discovers his misplaced gambling sobriety chip, an item he always has.
207	17	"The Lost in the Found"	Jeannot Szwarc	Emily Silver	May 7, 2015	AAKY17	4.49
When the remains of a girl are discovered in a ditch, it leads Booth and Brennan to a private high school where they discover she was a victim of bullying. They discover that the girl committed suicide, but made her own death to look like a murder and planted evidence so that the other girls who bullied her would be blamed for her death. Meanwhile, the rest of the Jeffersonian team discover Brennan is pregnant and Daisy ponders whether to start dating again, still reeling from the death of Sweets.
208	18	"The Verdict in the Victims"	Michael Lange	Nkechi Okoro Carroll	May 7, 2015	AAKY18	4.49
After Brennan re-examines an old case and finds new evidence, she believes Alex Rockwell, a man she and Booth convicted as a serial killer in "The Baker in the Bits" did not actually commit the murders. The team races to prove who the serial killer is as Rockwell will be put to death in 48 hours. Meanwhile, Angela and Hodgins contemplate their future, possibly moving to Paris. Linda Lavin guest stars as the judge approached to stop the execution.
209	19	"The Murder in the Middle East"	Milan Cheylov	Michael Peterson	May 14, 2015	AAKY19	4.71
Booth and Cam travel to Tehran, Iran, when they learn Arastoo has been kidnapped by a member of the Iranian parliament to assist in a murder investigation. They must identify the killer for Arastoo to be released. Meanwhile, Brennan discovers Booth's gambling relapse when his bookie shows up to collect a $30,000 debt and threatens her and Christine, which results in Brennan enlisting Aubrey's help to keep them safe. When Booth returns from Iran, Brennan confronts him and kicks him out of the house.
210	20	"The Woman in the Whirlpool"	Dwight Little	Kathy Reichs & Kerry Reichs	May 28, 2015	AAKY20	5.42
Booth and Aubrey investigate the murder of a woman who was a collector of cookie jars. Meanwhile, Booth struggles to accept Brennan kicking him out of the house and begins to attend Gamblers Anonymous hoping to overcome his addiction. Also, Aubrey gets close with Jeffersonian intern, Jessica.
211	21	"The Life in the Light"	Randy Zisk	Keith Foglesong	June 4, 2015	AAKY21	5.21
The team investigate the death of a yoga instructor, who was previously a biker gang member. Meanwhile, Booth reaches his 30th day clean and continues to make progress with healing his relationship with Brennan. Angela and Hodgins decide to move to Paris and Hodgins finally learns Angela's birth name.
212	22	"The Next in the Last"	Ian Toynton	Stephen Nathan & Jonathan Collier	June 11, 2015	AAKY22	5.11
The team investigates the remains of a possible protégé of serial killer Christopher Pelant. Angela and Hodgins decide to not move to Paris, and they stay at the Jeffersonian. Meanwhile, Brennan and Booth move on from their careers at the Jeffersonian and the FBI.

== Ratings ==
=== Live +7 DVR ratings ===
Live +7 ratings is the number of viewers who watched a particular episode live, plus the number of viewers via DVR over a seven-day period from the original broadcast.

No.	Episode	Air date	Time slot (ET)	18–49 rating increase	Viewers increase (millions)	Total 18–49	Total viewers (millions)	Ref
1	"The Conspiracy in the Corpse"	September 25, 2014	Thursdays; 8:00 p.m.	0.8	2.49	2.4	8.83	
2	"The Lance to the Heart"	October 2, 2014	Thursdays; 8:00 p.m.	0.9	2.75	2.4	9.16	
3	"The Purging of the Pundit"	October 9, 2014	Thursdays; 8:00 p.m.	0.8	2.35	2.4	8.74	
4	"The Geek in the Guck"	October 16, 2014	Thursdays; 8:00 p.m.	0.8	2.58	2.5	9.14	
5	"The Corpse at the Convention"	October 30, 2014	Thursdays; 8:00 p.m.	0.8	2.57	2.1	8.17	
6	"The Lost Love in the Foreign Land"	November 6, 2014	Thursdays; 8:00 p.m.	0.9	2.69	2.2	8.33	
7	"The Money Maker on the Merry-Go-Round"	November 13, 2014	Thursdays; 8:00 p.m.	0.8	2.53	2.1	8.03	
8	"The Puzzler in the Pit"	November 20, 2014	Thursdays; 8:00 p.m.	0.8	2.31	2.1	7.58	
9	"The Mutilation of the Master Manipulator"	December 4, 2014	Thursdays; 8:00 p.m.	0.8	2.63	2.3	8.33	
10	"The 200th in the 10th"	December 11, 2014	Thursdays; 8:00 p.m.	0.8	1.85	2.0	7.34	
11	"The Psychic in the Soup"	March 26, 2015	Thursdays; 8:00 p.m.	0.7	2.36	2.0	8.20	
12	"The Teacher in the Books"	April 2, 2015	Thursdays; 8:00 p.m.	0.8	2.68	1.9	7.42	
13	"The Baker in the Bits"	April 9, 2015	Thursdays; 8:00 p.m.	0.6	2.21	1.7	7.24	
14	"The Putter in the Rough"	April 16, 2015	Thursdays; 8:00 p.m.	0.7	2.48	1.7	7.36	
15	"The Eye in the Sky"	April 23, 2015	Thursdays; 8:00 p.m.	0.6	2.13	1.6	6.78	
16	"The Big Beef at the Royal Diner"	April 30, 2015	Thursdays; 8:00 p.m.	0.7	2.25	1.7	6.54	
17	"The Lost in the Found"	May 7, 2015	Thursdays; 8:00 p.m.	0.5	1.93	1.6	6.64	
18	"The Verdict in the Victims"	May 7, 2015	Thursdays; 8:00 p.m.	0.5	1.84	1.6	6.11	
19	"The Murder in the Middle East"	May 14, 2015	Thursdays; 8:00 p.m.	0.6	1.91	1.6	6.62	
20	"The Woman in the Whirlpool"	May 28, 2015	Thursdays; 8:00 p.m.	0.6	2.01	1.8	7.43	
21	"The Life in the Light"	June 4, 2015	Thursdays; 8:00 p.m.	0.7	1.97	1.8	7.17	
22	"The Next in the Last"	June 11, 2015	Thursdays; 8:00 p.m.	0.7	2.25	1.9	7.36	

== DVD release ==
The tenth season of Bones was released on DVD (subtitled "Blackmail & Jail Edition") in region 1 on September 29, 2015, and in region 2 on October 12, 2015. The set includes all 22 episodes of season ten on a 6-disc DVD set presented in anamorphic widescreen. Special features include deleted scenes, a gag reel, and two featurettes—"Sweets' Sweetest Moments" and "From Script to Screen: Creating the 200th Episode".
