= Bones season 5 =

Bones
- Season 5
- Season 5 DVD cover art
- No. of episodes: 22

Release
- Original network: Fox
- Original release: September 17, 2009 – May 20, 2010

Season chronology
- ← Previous; Season 4 Next → Season 6

The fifth season of the American television series Bones premiered on September 17, 2009, and concluded on May 20, 2010, on Fox. The show maintained its previous time slot, airing on Thursdays at 8:00 pm ET for the entire season. The season consisted of 22 episodes, including the show's 100th episode, and averaged 10 million viewers.

== Cast and characters ==
=== Main cast ===
- Emily Deschanel as Dr. Temperance "Bones" Brennan, a forensic anthropologist
- David Boreanaz as FBI Special Agent Seeley Booth, who is the official FBI liaison with the Jeffersonian
- Michaela Conlin as Angela Montenegro, a forensic artist
- Tamara Taylor as Dr. Camille Saroyan, a forensic pathologist and the head of the forensic division
- T. J. Thyne as Dr. Jack Hodgins, an entomologist
- John Francis Daley as Dr. Lance Sweets, an FBI psychologist, who provides psychological reports on criminals and staff including Brennan and Booth

=== Recurring cast ===
- Patricia Belcher as Caroline Julian, a prosecutor
- Diedrich Bader as FBI Assistant Director Andrew Hacker
- Tiffany Hines as Michelle Welton, Cam's adopted daughter
- Ryan O'Neal as Max Keenan, Brennan's father
- Ty Panitz as Parker Booth, Booth's son
- Zooey Deschanel as Margaret Whitesell, Brennan's relative
- Brendan Fehr as Jared Booth, Booth's brother
- Stephen Fry as Dr. Gordon Wyatt, Booth's former psychiatrist
- Billy Gibbons as Angela's father
- Elon Gold as Dr. Paul Lidner, Cam's boyfriend
- Cyndi Lauper as Avalon Harmonia, a psychic
- Deirdre Lovejoy as Heather Taffet
- Eric Millegan as Dr. Zack Addy
- Dilshad Vadsaria as Padme Dalaj, Jared's wife
- Ralph Waite as Hank Booth, Seeley's grandfather

Interns

- Eugene Byrd as Dr. Clark Edison
- Carla Gallo as Daisy Wick
- Michael Grant Terry as Wendell Bray
- Pej Vahdat as Arastoo Vaziri
- Ryan Cartwright as Vincent Nigel-Murray
- Joel David Moore as Colin Fisher

== Storyline ==
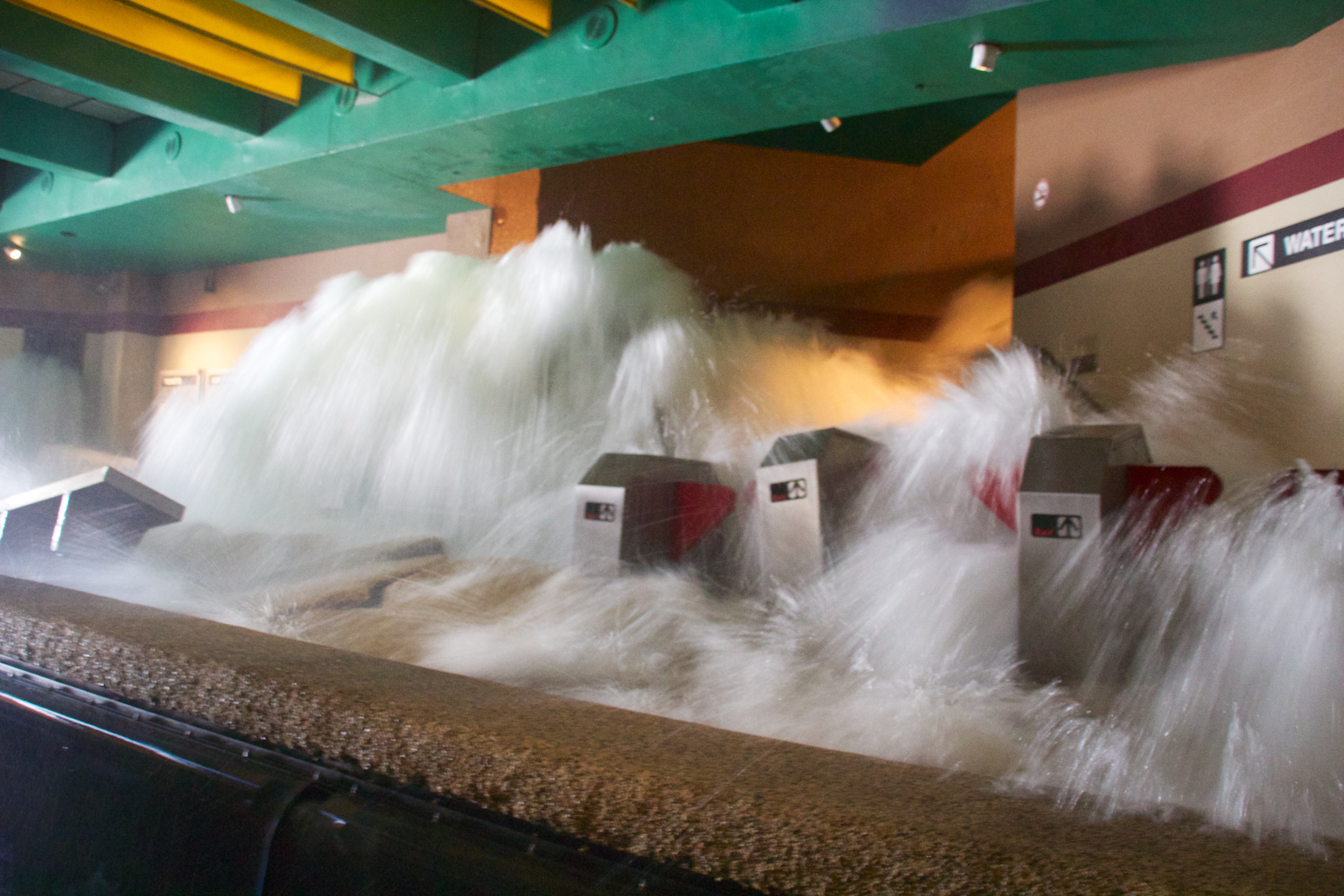
The flooding train station at the start of episode 15 was the earthquake attraction on the Studio Tour, depicted here in 2012

Key plotlines in the fifth season include the 100th episode (directed by David Boreanaz), which flashes back to Booth and Brennan's first assignment that showcases their original relationship, which leads Booth to confess his true feelings to Brennan. The 100th episode also features the return of Eric Millegan as Zack Addy. Angela and Hodgins rekindle their love after spending some quality time together in a jail cell, and decide to get married. Heather Taffet aka the Gravedigger is put on trial for her crimes, and the team's strong case against her leads to a conviction where she is finally put away, but warns Brennan "that it's not over". In the season finale, many of the characters begin to embark on trips that will take them out of the country for one year, intending to return and pick things up where they left off one year from that day. Temperance, along with Daisy Wick, go to the Maluku Islands to study a full set of interspecies hominid remains that could be a crucial link in the evolutionary chain. Booth returns to the Army as a Sergeant Major to train soldiers in apprehending insurgents. Meanwhile, newlywed Angela and Hodgins decide to travel.

The season was originally supposed to include a black-and-white noir-inspired episode, but the idea was dropped after another Fox series, Fringe, did a similar episode. The episode "The Gamer in the Grease" features promotion of the film Avatar. The cross promotion was suggested by Avatar producer Jon Landau and the episode features recurring actor Joel David Moore, who also appears in Avatar as one of the secondary protagonists.

== Episodes ==
No. overall	No. in season	Title	Directed by	Written by	Original release date	Prod. code	US viewers (millions)
85	1	"Harbingers in a Fountain"	Ian Toynton	Hart Hanson	September 17, 2009	5AKY01	10.36
Booth returns to the FBI after being certified by Dr. Sweets and wonders if his feelings for Brennan are real or if they are just the effects from his brain surgery. Angela's psychic Avalon (Cyndi Lauper) leads Booth and Brennan to a crime regarding bodies being buried under a fountain in Washington, one of which is Avalon's younger sister.
86	2	"The Bond in the Boot"	Alex Chapple	Michael Peterson	September 24, 2009	5AKY02	9.12
Booth and Brennan investigate a highly classified case regarding the death of a man and a CIA analyst, which revolves around the unknown contents of a briefcase. Funding is cut back at the Jeffersonian, leaving Wendell's (Michael Grant Terry) scholarship at risk, but anonymous donations are made, saving his internship. Booth deals with effects of his coma, causing him to relearn how to fix the broken pipes for his sink, instead of paying for a plumber.
87	3	"The Plain in the Prodigy"	Allan Kroeker	Karine Rosenthal	October 1, 2009	5AKY03	9.43
The team investigates the remains of a teenage Amish boy who disappeared two months prior to Rumspringa, where he would explore the outside world. They later discover the boy was a piano prodigy and kept it as a secret from his family. Cam deals with parenting issues as she believes her stepdaughter Michelle might be having sex, leading Booth to help out.
88	4	"The Beautiful Day in the Neighborhood"	Gordon C. Lonsdale	Janet Lin	October 8, 2009	5AKY04	10.29
The team investigates the remains that were found in a barbecue pit during a suburban neighborhood block party, leading to several secrets about the residents in the neighborhood being exposed. Iranian intern Arastoo confesses to everyone that he has been faking his accent and explains why he did so. Booth's son Parker seems concerned that his dad does not have a girlfriend.
89	5	"A Night at the Bones Museum"	Jeannot Szwarc	Carla Kettner & Josh Berman	October 15, 2009	5AKY05	9.59
A mysteriously charred body that is found on an electrical fence turns out to be a mummified Egyptian royal that was loaned to the Jeffersonian from the Egyptian government. The team investigates as the curator that was prepping the mummy is found murdered. Booth's supervisor, the assistant director of the FBI, Andrew Hacker (Diedrich Bader), shows interest in Brennan and they later go on a date. Sweets convinces Brennan to give Daisy (Carla Gallo) another chance, having her return to the Jeffersonian as an intern.
90	6	"The Tough Man in the Tender Chicken"	Dwight Little	Dean Lopata	November 5, 2009	5AKY06	8.66
When the remains of a local chicken farmer are found mutilated by a nearby river, Booth and Brennan investigate the various suspects, including several animal rights activists who are protesting outside the chicken factory. Angela, feeling bothered by the practices of the chicken farm, asks for donations to save a piglet in which Brennan declines as her belief of saving one will not change anything, causing her to question why they are friends. After Wendell makes a donation to Angela, they kiss and a relationship starts to develop as Angela has now been celibate for five and half months.
91	7	"The Dwarf in the Dirt"	Chad Lowe	Karyn Usher	November 12, 2009	5AKY07	10.22
The team investigate the remains of a person with dwarfism who is found in a sinkhole. The victim was known as "The Iron Leprechaun", who competed in a wrestling league. Booth, still dealing with effects from his brain tumor, has problems with his aim and must be re-certified for FBI marksmanship. He then seeks advice from Dr. Gordon Wyatt (Stephen Fry), who is now a chef, in hopes of overcoming the problem. Wyatt suggests he should use his inclination towards protecting Brennan to his advantage.
92	8	"The Foot in the Foreclosure"	Jeff Woolnough	Pat Charles	November 19, 2009	5AKY08	9.88
When the charred remains of a person are found by a real estate agent during a tour of the house, Booth and Brennan must investigate the mysterious way the person turned to ashes. Booth deals with taking care of his grandfather Hank (Ralph Waite) as he prepares to move in, and Hank gives relationship advice to both Booth and Brennan.
93	9	"The Gamer in the Grease"	Kate Woods	Dean Lopata	December 3, 2009	5AKY09	9.92
The team investigate the death of a pro gamer whose body is found in a grease truck. The victim, Steve Rifton, was the only person to get a perfect score on a popular arcade game, Punky Pong. Intern Colin Fisher (Joel David Moore) invites Hodgins and Sweets to the premiere of the science fiction film Avatar, where each must take turns standing in line.
94	10	"The Goop on the Girl"	Tim Southam	Carla Kettner	December 10, 2009	5AKY10	10.90
A man dressed as Santa Claus wearing an explosive vest is blown up via a radio frequency after robbing a bank, leaving Booth and Brennan to investigate the identity of the bomber and who set off the explosives. Brennan plans on spending Christmas in El Salvador, but her father (Ryan O'Neal) convinces her to stay and spend it with him and her second cousin on her mother's side, Margaret (Zooey Deschanel). After solving the case, the Jeffersonian team attend the funeral of the man who was killed after they discover he was forced into the robbery, comforting the mother who was his only family. The team later celebrate a Christmas dinner at Brennan's.
95	11	"The X in the File"	Allison Liddi-Brown	Janet Lin	January 14, 2010	5AKY11	10.67
Booth and Brennan travel to Roswell, New Mexico, after remains resembling an alien are found in the desert. Hodgins deals with his jealousy after Angela and Wendell confess they are in a relationship.
96	12	"The Proof in the Pudding"	Emile Levisetti	Bob Harris	January 21, 2010	5AKY12	11.93
The Jeffersonian lab is put on lock down by mysterious government agents led by Mr. White (Richard T. Jones) when they demand Brennan and her team identify of cause of death for a highly classified set of remains. The team eventually come to believe the set of remains they are working on are actually that of assassinated President John F. Kennedy. Cam finds a positive pregnancy test in the woman's bathroom and after all the women deny it is theirs, she believes it might be Michelle's (Cam's adopted daughter). After, Angela confesses to Cam that it was actually hers, but did not want anyone else to know. In the interim, Cam had it tested again, and reveals to Angela that it was a false positive, meaning she is not pregnant.
97	13	"The Dentist in the Ditch"	Dwight Little	Pat Charles & Josh Berman	January 28, 2010	5AKY13	12.37
A human skeleton is found in a ditch on an old Civil War battleground and is covered in clay, making it difficult for the team to determine the cause of death. Booth's brother Jared (Brendan Fehr) returns from his travels with a new girlfriend, whom he intends to marry. Feeling suspicious, Booth performs a background check on her, which angers his brother. They later reconcile, where Jared tells him they do not keep secrets from each other and asks him to be his best man.
98	14	"The Devil in the Details"	Ian Toynton	Michael Peterson	February 4, 2010	5AKY14	12.37
Booth and Brennan investigate the remains of a demon-like body found in a church that has horns and a tail. The case leads them to Havenhurst Sanitarium, where the victim was committed, as he had schizophrenia. The case causes intern Arastoo Vaziri to talk about his beliefs of good and evil and he reveals a secret he has been keeping for many years.
99	15	"The Bones on the Blue Line"	Chad Lowe	Carla Kettner	April 1, 2010	5AKY15	8.44
While Dr. Sweets is on a subway train, a stranger tells him he has just been cured of leukemia, then an earthquake strikes and the train is thrown off its tracks as a water main breaks, causing havoc inside the train leading to death of the man who had just been cured of cancer. The accident exposes a skeleton that was caused by the flooding, leading Booth and Brennan to investigate. With the release of Brennan's fourth book, a reporter (Seiko Matsuda) interviews her for a Japanese magazine and follows her and the team around. Sweets deals with the near-death experience feeling it was a message to live his life fully, leading him to make a decision about his relationship with Daisy.
100	16	"The Parts in the Sum of the Whole"	David Boreanaz	Hart Hanson	April 8, 2010	5AKY16	9.99
Booth and Brennan set the record straight regarding when they first met as Dr. Sweets has completed his book detailing the relationship between the two which he believes they are in love. Sweets is worried that this information could invalidate his book so he has them tell the story of when they first met, which happened six years earlier. The story includes how Angela came to work for Brennan at the Jeffersonian; the first time Brennan, Hodgins and her grad student Zack (Eric Millegan) worked on fresh remains; and that Booth and Brennan shared a kiss during their first case and Brennan decided not to spend the night with him as they were both drunk.
101	17	"The Death of the Queen Bee"	Allan Kroeker	Mark Lisson	April 15, 2010	5AKY17	9.92
An investigation leads Brennan back to her old high school, where a classmate of Brennan's is found murdered, similar to another girl in her class 15 years prior. Booth and Brennan go undercover as a married couple during the high school reunion to try to discover the killer, which includes several of her previous classmates. Brennan is helped by her only friend from high school, the janitor, Ray Buxley (Robert Englund), to help find the killer. Back at the lab, Wendell accidentally finds out from Hodgins that Angela believed she was pregnant and did not tell him. Wendell then tells her would have taken his share of the responsibility and consequences. Later, Angela ends their relationship as she felt his answer to the pregnancy was that it was his obligation. After the case, the team get together at the bar sharing their high school experience. Brennan expresses she was glad she attended the reunion and that she realizes how lucky she is to have the friendship she has today.
102	18	"The Predator in the Pool"	Dwight Little	Karyn Usher	April 22, 2010	5AKY18	9.01
A case leads Booth and Brennan to an aquarium where the remains were found inside a shark. The case is brought to them by Dr. Catherine Bryar (Rena Sofer) of the National Oceanic and Atmospheric Administration, who seems to show an interest in Booth. Both Booth and Brennan try to move on into romantic relationships as Brennan goes on another date with Andrew Hacker, and Booth asks out Catherine after the case is solved.
103	19	"The Rocker in the Rinse Cycle"	Jeff Woolnough	Karine Rosenthal	April 29, 2010	5AKY19	9.28
When the body of thrill-seeker is found in a hotel laundry machine, Booth and Brennan investigate the place he was last seen–a rock and roll fantasy camp, hosted by the prolific rocker Simon Graham (Michael Des Barres). Cam looks for a gynecologist for her adoptive daughter Michelle. Cam later goes out on a date with Dr. Lidner (Elon Gold) after he asks her out.
104	20	"The Witch in the Wardrobe"	François Velle	Kathy Reichs	May 6, 2010	5AKY20	9.05
The remains of two witches, one of which is from the Salem witch trials from the 1600s and the other a modern day Wiccan, are discovered in the remains of a burnt out cabin. Booth and Brennan investigate the world of Wicca, including discovering the Wiccan group of which the victim was a part. Hodgins and Angela wind up in jail after some reckless driving and have to work the case from the jail cell. After spending quality time together, they realize they are still in love. Hodgins subsequently proposes to Angela and they are married by the judge who hears their case.
105	21	"The Boy with the Answer"	Dwight Little	Stephen Nathan	May 13, 2010	5AKY21	9.20
The Jeffersonian team and prosecutor Caroline Julian (Patricia Belcher) work to convict Heather Taffet aka the Gravedigger (Deirdre Lovejoy) who is defending herself at her trial. Brennan, Booth, and Hodgins are forced to drop their own charges against Taffet once they discover the missing remains of a young boy who was killed by the Gravedigger, so they could work and testify against Taffet. Believing Taffet will not be convicted, Brennan's father tries to kill her with a sniper rifle, but Booth is able to stop him and Max is jailed until the trial is over. After several attempts at finding evidence that Taffet successfully argues against, Hodgins discovers in the boy's mouth a dust mite that contains the DNA of Taffet, left there when he bit her. This evidence proves successful and the jury convicts Taffet of kidnapping and murder, but Taffet warns Brennan that "it's not over". The team later celebrates over drinks at the Founding Fathers bar.
106	22	"The Beginning in the End"	Ian Toynton	Hart Hanson & Stephen Nathan	May 20, 2010	5AKY22	9.21
The team investigate the remains of a hoarder whose body fell through the floor to another apartment when it collapsed due to major termite damage. They must sift through all his belongings to try to determine the cause of death. Hodgins is asked a favor from Angela's father (Billy Gibbons) to try to steal back a car he lost at a card game, although it just turns out to be a test to see if he would do it. Daisy is accepted to go to the Maluku Islands to study a full set of interspecies hominid remains that could be a crucial link in the evolutionary chain. She and Sweets discuss if he should go with her, as she will be gone for a year, but Sweets stays and they say their goodbyes at the airport. Brennan is also accepted to take part in the project, but is unsure if she wants to leave. Booth is contacted by the Army to return as a Sergeant Major to train soldiers in apprehending insurgents, but also is unsure if he wants to go. Later, the Jeffersonian team makes decisions that will have them apart for a year: Angela and Hodgins travel to Paris; Brennan and Daisy go to the Maluku Islands; and Booth goes to Afghanistan to train soldiers.

== DVD and Blu-ray release ==
The fifth season of Bones was released on DVD and Blu-ray (subtitled "Beyond the Grave Edition") in region 1 on October 5, 2010, in region 2 on October 18, 2010 and in region 4 on October 27, 2010. The set includes all 22 episodes of season five on a 6-disc DVD set and 4-disc Blu-ray set presented in anamorphic widescreen. Special features include two audio commentaries—"The Proof in the Pudding" by actors Tamara Taylor, John Francis Daley and Michaela Conlin and "The Beginning in the End" by executive producers Hart Hanson, Stephen Nathan and Ian Toynton. Featurettes include "The 100th Episode with Director David Boreanaz", "The Bodies of Bones" and "The Nunchuck Way". Also included are extended versions of "The Tough Man in the Tender Chicken" and "The X in the File", as well as deleted scenes and a gag reel.
