= Bones season 4 =

Bones
- Season 4
- Season 4 DVD cover art
- No. of episodes: 26

Release
- Original network: Fox
- Original release: September 3, 2008 – May 14, 2009

Season chronology
- ← Previous; Season 3 Next → Season 5

The fourth season of the American television series Bones premiered on September 3, 2008, with a two-hour episode, and concluded on May 14, 2009, on Fox. The show changed time slots again, airing on Wednesdays at 8:00 pm ET before moving to Thursdays at 8:00 pm ET in 2009. The season consisted of 26 episodes and averaged 10.8 million viewers.

== Cast and characters ==
=== Main cast ===
- Emily Deschanel as Dr. Temperance "Bones" Brennan, a forensic anthropologist
- David Boreanaz as FBI Special Agent Seeley Booth, the official FBI liaison with the Jeffersonian
- Michaela Conlin as Angela Montenegro, a forensic artist
- Tamara Taylor as Dr. Camille Saroyan, a forensic pathologist and the head of the forensic division
- T. J. Thyne as Dr. Jack Hodgins, an entomologist
- John Francis Daley as Dr. Lance Sweets, an FBI psychologist who studies the relationship between Dr. Brennan and Agent Booth

=== Recurring cast ===
- David Greenman as Marcus Geier, a forensic technician
- Patricia Belcher as Caroline Julian, a prosecutor
- Brendan Fehr as Jared Booth, Booth's brother
- Marisa Coughlan as FBI Agent Payton Perotta
- Nichole Hiltz as Roxie Lyon, Angela’s girlfriend
- Tuppence Middleton as Vera Waterhouse
- Eric Millegan as Dr. Zack Addy
- Ryan O'Neal as Max Keenan, Brennan's father
- Ty Panitz as Parker Booth, Booth's son
- Stephen Fry as Dr. Gordon Wyatt, Booth's former psychiatrist
- Billy Gibbons as Angela's father
- Deirdre Lovejoy as Heather Taffet

Interns

- Eugene Byrd as Dr. Clark Edison
- Ryan Cartwright as Vincent Nigel-Murray
- Michael Grant Terry as Wendell Bray
- Carla Gallo as Daisy Wick
- Joel David Moore as Colin Fisher
- Pej Vahdat as Arastoo Vaziri
- Michael Badalucco as Scott Starret

== Episodes ==
The season premieres with its first two-part episode, "The Yanks in the U.K." which was filmed on-location in the United Kingdom. Due to the season's extended episode count of 26 and multiple pre-emptions, Fox aired seven episodes throughout the month of April 2009, with new episodes airing on Monday and Wednesday, along with its regular timeslot of Thursday. This season sees the return of The Grave Digger, who was last seen in the second season. This time, The Grave Digger captures Booth. After Booth is rescued, the team discovers the true identity of The Grave Digger.

No. overall	No. in season	Title	Directed by	Written by	Original release date	Prod. code	US viewers (millions)
59 60	1 2	"The Yanks in the U.K."	Ian Toynton	Hart Hanson & Karine Rosenthal Stephen Nathan & Scott Williams	September 3, 2008	3AKY19 3AKY20	9.17 10.22
This two-hour season premiere, begins when Booth and Brennan are at Oxford University in Oxford, England for a conference. They are then called to London to help solve a case in collaboration with a pair of British investigators from Scotland Yard. Meanwhile, Angela's estranged husband, Grayson Barasa, is finally found, but he refuses to sign the divorce papers, much to the dismay of Hodgins and Angela. When one of the British investigators is murdered, Booth and Brennan become more determined to help solve the murder. Meanwhile, Angela and Hodgins continue to have relationship problems regarding their marriage.
61	3	"The Man in the Outhouse"	Steven DePaul	Carla Kettner & Mark Lisson	September 10, 2008	3AKY16	8.91
After an explosion in an outhouse, a body is discovered to have been left in the sewage. The body turns out to be a reality TV host with a long list of people that might want him dead and Booth and Brennan are left to narrow down the suspects.
62	4	"The Finger in the Nest"	Jeff Woolnough	Lyla Oliver	September 17, 2008	3AKY17	9.71
Parker, Booth's son, discovers a corpse's finger in a bird's nest, causing the team to launch an investigation to try to find the rest of the body. After finding the corpse, the team discovers that the death was caused by a dog, leading them to an illegal dog fighting ring and a search for the killer dog and its owner. Cesar Millan makes a guest appearance. Meanwhile, Hodgins struggles to come to terms with recent events and as such, finds himself having feelings of hate against his colleagues.
63	5	"The Perfect Pieces in the Purple Pond"	Jeannot Szwarc	Josh Berman	September 24, 2008	4AKY01	9.61
The pieces of a dismembered body are found lying in a purple pool of water, except the head is missing. The team finds that the body belongs to Jared Addison, a science fiction writer who had several mental problems. With Sweets's help, several suspects are hunted down, however the team has trouble finding enough evidence with the victim's head still missing... that is until they turn to Zack for help.
64	6	"The Crank in the Shaft"	Steven DePaul	Elizabeth Benjamin	October 1, 2008	3AKY18	9.82
The remains of a despised office manager are discovered in an elevator shaft, and Booth and Brennan must figure out which employee killed her. After some investigating, they find that the manager had more than a fair share of complaints on file. Meanwhile, Angela and Hodgins try to make peace in the lab after their break-up.
65	7	"The He in the She"	Craig Ross Jr.	Karina Csolty	October 8, 2008	3AKY15	10.34
When skeletal remains are found in the Chesapeake Bay, Brennan and Booth are on the case to investigate. With only the upper torso of the victim intact, the team has little to work from besides the remnants of the victim's breast implants. Brennan and Booth are led to a small church community in Maryland where the victim was a pastor, but they have no record of her existence prior to moving to the small town five years earlier.
66	8	"The Skull in the Sculpture"	Allan Kroeker	Janet Lin	November 5, 2008	4AKY03	10.09
A corpse is found inside a crushed car like those used in car sculptures made by an artist named Geoffrey Thorne. Evidence leads to the art gallery where Thorne displays his work. Roxie Lyon arrives on the scene and presents herself as Thorne's assistant. Roxie states that Geoffrey has been depressed and that he's been talking about being part of his exhibit. She is later revealed to be an ex girlfriend of Angela's. When Booth interrogates Roxie, he asks her if she slept with Geoffrey. Roxie claims that she didn't, since she's a lesbian, and to ask Angela if he doesn't believe her. Later, Roxie tells Angela that she was her muse and that when they broke up, Roxie lost her inspiration. Daisy Wick returns as the intern of the week.
67	9	"The Con Man in the Meth Lab"	Allison Liddi-Brown	Karine Rosenthal	November 12, 2008	4AKY04	10.87
Booth and Brennan investigate the scene where a body was uncovered during a police training exercise. The team identifies the body as a struggling inventor's father who had recently reunited with his son. But when a second body surfaces, the team is led on a trail of deception to find out who was the actual con-man in the inventor's life. Clark Edison returns to the lab, and he and Hodgins work on piecing together blueprints from one of the inventor's potentially valuable inventions. Meanwhile, Booth's younger brother Jared (guest star Brendan Fehr) moves to D.C. to take a job at the Pentagon, and Brennan, smitten with Jared, agrees to go on a date with him to a White House function. Her date with Jared leads her to learn information about Booth's past and give her a far greater understanding into her partner's motives.
68	10	"The Passenger in the Oven"	Steven DePaul	Carla Kettner	November 19, 2008	4AKY05	10.73
Booth and Brennan are en route to China where Brennan has been summoned to help identify pre-historic anthropological remains with Booth in tow to watch over her highly sensitive equipment. However, their flight is disrupted when a flight attendant discovers a fully cooked human body in the plane's industrial microwave. Booth and Brennan connect with the team back in the U.S. via internet connection and they use Brennan's high-tech equipment, as well as odds and ends from the airline passengers, to send evidence back to the Jeffersonian for processing. When they identify the victim as a travel writer working on a controversial story about airline pilots, Booth and Brennan must race against the clock and solve the murder before the plane lands in China and they lose their jurisdiction over the case. Meanwhile, back in the states, Angela and Roxie's relationship progresses as Hodgins tries to move on.
69	11	"The Bone That Blew"	Jessica Landaw	Carla Kettner	November 26, 2008	4AKY02	9.76
When a skull and various skeletal remains are found in a tree in a nationally protected wooded preserve, Brennan and Booth are on the case to investigate. Back at the Jeffersonian, Brennan learns of her father's new position as a teacher, a prospect she is less than happy to learn about, allegedly because of his recent acquittal for murder. In a lucky break, the victim's bones are identified in a government database as those of an ex-Marine who has been off-the grid for nearly three years. With no records of his whereabouts from the past three years, the team turns to the internet for answers. The investigation eventually leads Brennan and Booth to an ultra-elite private school and a group of rich and powerful families, one of whom the ex-Marine had worked for as a “nanny”. As the investigation continues, the team finds Brennan's father to be an unlikely asset to the case, but Brennan is opposed to her father's involvement.
70	12	"Double Trouble in the Panhandle"	Dwight Little	Lyla Oliver	January 22, 2009	4AKY06	9.97
The team investigates the death of female conjoined twins who were in the process of deciding to get separated or not. The twins were working in a circus, which means that Booth will come face to face with a clown during the investigation. Brennan and Booth go undercover as Wanda and Buck Moosejaw, Canadian performers in a knife-throwing act. Sweets helps Brennan and Booth understand Circus lingo.
71	13	"Fire in the Ice"	Chad Lowe	Scott Williams	January 22, 2009	4AKY07	7.52
The body of a fireman is discovered in a frozen lake. Booth becomes a suspect as he was seen fighting with the victim during an amateur hockey game some weeks ago. He is replaced by his colleague Agent Payton Perotta, much to Brennan's annoyance. When the investigation hits a dead end, the team, with Booth and Wendell's help, resort to an unusual method to collect the evidence needed. NHL legend Luc Robitaille guest stars.
72	14	"The Hero in the Hold"	Ian Toynton	Janet Lin & Karine Rosenthal	February 5, 2009	4AKY08	10.76
The evidence from the Gravedigger case has gone missing. Brennan and Hodgins, who have not fully recovered from being buried alive, are suspected of taking it. On the night of a ceremony recognizing Brennan, Booth gets knocked out, tasered, pumped full of drugs, and stuffed in a toy-like yellow submarine. When he gets out of the tiny submarine, Booth finds himself face to face with someone from his military past. The team works on locating Booth and finding who is behind the kidnapping, with the help of Booth's brother Jared. Agent Perotta also appears.
73	15	"The Princess and the Pear"	Steven DePaul	Matthew Donlan & Jeremy Martin	February 19, 2009	4AKY09	9.50
With Booth in the hospital with a bad back, Brennan must work with Agent Payton Perrota to investigate the murder of a promotional model for ImagiCon (a parody of the comic book convention Comic-Con). Their investigation leads them to discover that the murder of the woman might be linked to possession of the legendary prop sword Excalibur from a famous French movie, La Mort d'Arthur.
74	16	"The Bones That Foam"	David Boreanaz	Elizabeth Benjamin	March 12, 2009	4AKY10	9.55
A bungee-jumping couple plunged off of a hot-air balloon after getting married only to come face-to-face with a corpse lying at the bottom of the gorge. After ruling out suicide, Brennan, Booth and Sweets find themselves in the dirty side of the automobile sales industry. At the Jeffersonian, Cam notices an unknown substance oozing from the body and puts the lab into lockdown. The team have only 24 hours to unravel the mystery before the bones disintegrate.
75	17	"The Salt in the Wounds"	Steven DePaul	Carla Kettner & Josh Berman	March 19, 2009	4AKY11	10.19
Booth and Brennan investigate a petrified human body found buried in a mound of salt in a city de-icing truck. They discover that the victim was a pregnant 16-year-old high school volleyball player, and are shocked to find that nearly half of her teammates are either pregnant or already have had babies from the same father. Meanwhile, Roxie breaks up with Angela, who, seeking solace, has a one-night stand with Hodgins.
76	18	"The Doctor in the Den"	Ian Toynton	Janet Lin & Karine Rosenthal	April 2, 2009	4AKY12	8.98
The half-eaten body of Cam's former fiancé is found in the tiger enclosure at the wildlife park, and Booth and Brennan determine the death was no accident. The team pieces together the fiancé's final evening and questions suspects, including Brandon Casey, whom Sweets and Angela hypnotize to help jog his memory. Angela takes a vow of celibacy and it's revealed that Clark is romantically involved. In the end, Cam offers to adopt the doctor's daughter.
77	19	"The Science in the Physicist"	Brad Turner	Karina Csolty	April 9, 2009	4AKY13	8.88
Booth and Brennan are sent to investigate when human remains are found during a photo shoot. When the team uncovers a meteorite in the victim's ear, they are led to the Collar Institute of Science in D.C. There they learn the victim had been a part of a controversial project, Brennan and Booth must investigate the several death threats she had received. Meanwhile, Angela's father arrives in town to confront Hodgins.
78	20	"The Cinderella in the Cardboard"	Steven DePaul	Carla Kettner & Josh Berman	April 15, 2009	4AKY14	10.76
When an image of the Virgin Mary turns out to be a bloodstain at a cardboard recycling plant Booth and Bones find a flattened body inside a compressed bale of cardboard. The line of suspects grows longer when the team discovers that the marriage-obsessed young woman had a fiancé as well as numerous boyfriends from a cell-phone dating service. Booth and Bones must break the news to Sweets when they see his girlfriend Daisy trying on a wedding dress with another man, and Angela and Hodgins come to terms with their relationship.
79	21	"Mayhem on a Cross"	Jeff Woolnough	Dean Lopata	April 16, 2009	4AKY15	8.72
When a skeleton is found being used as a stage prop for a black metal band in Norway, authorities call the FBI upon discovering that the man, a bassist with the stage name Mayhem, is a US citizen. The investigation into underground extreme metal bands brings to light the teams' own surprising musical preferences and a revelation about Sweets' past. Meanwhile, Dr. Gordon Wyatt is back, helping Sweets write his book on Booth and Brennan by giving him a perspective on their relationship.
80	22	"The Double Death of the Dearly Departed"	Milan Cheylov	Craig Silverstein	April 20, 2009	4AKY16	8.38
When a colleague from the Jeffersonian's Egyptology department dies of heart failure, Brennan realizes at the wake that the death was not an accident. Brennan convinces Booth to steal the body and sneak it back to the Jeffersonian so she and Cam can investigate while the rest of the team put on a front to deflect suspicion. Cam runs into trouble when she attempts to get Michelle, her newly adopted teenager, to stop smoking.
81	23	"The Girl in the Mask"	Ian Toynton	Michael Peterson	April 23, 2009	4AKY17	8.22
When the head of Sachi Nakamura, the sister of Booth's friend, is discovered in Washington, D.C., her brother Ken, a detective from Tokyo, flies in to aid the search for his sister's killer. The investigation leads to an elite escort service, and the team must race against the clock when Sachi's roommate goes missing as well.
82	24	"The Beaver in the Otter"	Brad Turner	Scott Williams	April 30, 2009	4AKY18	8.83
Jimmy 'Beaver' Bouvier is found strung up in the costume of his college mascot, an otter. Booth and Bones must investigate whether he was dead beforehand, or was killed during a Middlesex University bonfire event.
83	25	"The Critic in the Cabernet"	Kevin Hooks	Stephen Nathan	May 7, 2009	4AKY19	8.62
The team is on the case when human remains are found inside a barrel of wine during a wine tasting. When the victim turns out to be a wine critic whose scathing reviews were capable of sending a vineyard to its ruin, everyone from the winery's owner to the victim's own wife becomes a suspect. Meanwhile, Brennan decides to have a baby and asks Booth to be the father; when Booth begins to doubt himself, he finds himself talking to Stewie Griffin from Family Guy (Seth MacFarlane reprising his role).
84	26	"The End in the Beginning"	Ian Toynton	Hart Hanson	May 14, 2009	4AKY20	8.70
All of the regular characters are seen living different lives. Booth and Brennan are married and own a nightclub called "The Lab". When a body is found at the club, Detectives Cam Saroyan and Jared Booth are called to investigate. However, everything is not as it seems. For example, Caroline Julian, normally a federal prosecutor, is a defense lawyer; and Sweets is the frontman of the band Gormogon, who was a cannibalistic serial killer. It is subsequently revealed that Booth has been in a coma for several days due to his brain tumor operation, and that the life he saw was possibly only a dream or a hallucination. It is also revealed that Brennan had been writing at his side, possibly narrating her story out loud as she wrote it, causing Booth to hallucinate what he did. She ends up deleting her work. The episode ends with Booth awakening from his coma with no memory of who Brennan is.

== DVD and Blu-ray release ==
The fourth season of Bones was released on DVD (subtitled "Body Bag Edition") in region 1 on October 6, 2009, in region 2 on October 26, 2009 and in region 4 on October 27, 2009. This was the first season to be released on Blu-ray, and was only released in region A alongside the region 1 DVD release. The region 1 DVD set only includes 22 episodes of season four, as the first four episodes of the season were made available as bonus episodes on the season three DVD set. While the Blu-ray release, and the region 2 and 4 versions include all 26 episodes of the season. Special features include two featurettes—"Androgyny: Playing Haru Tanaka" and "Squints in Training"; three extended episodes—"The Perfect Pieces in the Purple Pond", "The Doctor in the Den" and "The Girl in the Mask". Also included are deleted scenes and a gag reel.
