= John Boyd (actor) =

American actor

- Born: October 22, 1981 (age 44); New York City, US
- Education: Bennington College
- Occupation: Actor
- Years active: 2005–present
- Spouse: Nicole Vicius
- Children: 3
- Father: Guy Boyd

John Boyd is an American actor who is known for starring as Arlo Glass in the eighth and final season of the Fox espionage thriller 24 in 2010. He also co-starred in the Academy Award-winning political thriller Argo (2012) and starred from 2014 to 2017 as FBI Special Agent James Aubrey on the Fox crime procedural comedy-drama Bones from the 10th season until the 12th and final season. In 2019, he started as Special Agent Stuart Scola in CBS crime drama series FBI.

== Early life ==
Boyd is an alumnus of Bennington College.

== Career ==
Boyd began his acting career in 2005, appearing in short films and various minor roles in films and guest-starring on an episode of the NBC legal drama Law & Order in 2005; Boyd returned to the show in 2006, but as a different character. In 2010, he was cast in his first starring role on television in the eighth season of the Fox espionage thriller 24 as Arlo Glass.

Following the cancellation of 24, Boyd guest-starred in USA legal drama Suits and was scheduled to be cast as Todd in the Fox comedy pilot Iceland in 2011, but it was not picked up by the network. Boyd co-starred in the 2012 Academy Award-winning political thriller Argo with Ben Affleck and Bryan Cranston. In 2013, he guest-starred on the short-lived Fox thriller Touch, which reunited Boyd with his 24 co-star Kiefer Sutherland.

In 2014, Boyd began starring as FBI Special Agent James Aubrey in the Fox crime procedural comedy-drama Bones in the tenth season. He was credited as a special guest star during the season premiere titled "The Conspiracy in the Corpse" and was added to the main cast in the second episode titled "The Lance to the Heart" following the departure of John Francis Daley, who played Dr. Lance Sweets, from the show at the end of the season premiere. Boyd remained on the show until it ended with the twelfth season in 2017.

In 2017, in the fifth episode titled "The Tutor in the Tussle," James Aubrey (Boyd) meets with his estranged, criminal father Philip Aubrey. Philip Aubrey is played by Boyd's real-life father Guy Boyd.

== Filmography ==
=== Film ===
| Year | Title | Role | Notes |
|---|---|---|---|
| 2005 | Stay | Louis | Short film |
| 2005 | The Notorious Bettie Page | Jack | |
| 2005 | Building Girl | Colin | |
| 2006 | Follow Me | Grover | Short film |
| 2006 | Fields of Freedom | Private Dooley | |
| 2006 | Lady in the Water | One-eyebrow smoker | |
| 2007 | Careless | Drunk guy | |
| 2009 | The Greatest | Wyatt | |
| 2009 | Mercy | Erik | |
| 2010 | Jelly | Floyd Marks | |
| 2012 | Argo | Lamont | |
| 2018 | Peppermint | Marvin | |

=== Television ===
| Year | Title | Role | Notes |
|---|---|---|---|
| 2005 | Law & Order | Zack Burns | Episode: "Locomotion" |
| 2006 | Law & Order | Kenny Ellis | Episode: "Profiteer" |
| 2008 | Fringe | Ian Spencer (uncredited) | Episode: "In Which We Meet Mr. Jones" |
| 2010 | 24 | Arlo Glass | Main role, 24 episodes |
| 2011 | Suits | Gregory Boone | Episode: "Errors and Omissions" |
| 2011 | Iceland | Todd | Unsold TV pilot |
| 2013 | Touch | Kase | 4 episodes |
| 2014 | The Carrie Diaries | Elliot | 2 episodes |
| 2014–17 | Bones | James Aubrey | Main role, 56 episodes |
| 2019–present | FBI | Special Agent Stuart Scola | Main role (Season 2, episode 4 onwards), Recurring (episode 1–3) |
| 2020, 2023 & 2024 | FBI: Most Wanted | Special Agent Stuart Scola | Special Guest Star, Episodes: "Reveille, Imminent Threat, Part III, & Supply Chain" |
| 2023 | FBI: International | Special Agent Stuart Scola | Special Guest Star, Episode: "Imminent Threat, Part I” |
