= Lance Sweets =

Fictional character from the television series Bones

Dr. Lance Sweets, PhD., Psy.D
- Bones character
- First appearance: October 23, 2007 (3x04, "The Secret in the Soil")
- Last appearance: September 25, 2014 (10x01, "The Conspiracy in the Corpse")
- Created by: Hart Hanson
- Portrayed by: John Francis Daley
- Other appearances: The Finder

In-universe information
- Nicknames: Sweets, Lancelot, Baby Duck, Baby Boy Shrink
- Gender: Male
- Title(s): Doctor (Psy.D. and PhD.)
- Occupation: Psychologist
- Family: Mr. Finley (adoptive father; deceased) Mrs. Finley (adoptive mother; deceased)
- Spouses: Daisy Wick (fiancée)
- Children: Seeley Lance Wick Sweets (son)

Dr. Lance Sweets, Ph.D., Psy.D., is a fictional character in the American television series Bones. He was portrayed by John Francis Daley.

Daley first made three guest appearances as Sweets during the first eight episodes of Season 3, first appearing in "The Secret in the Soil". He was promoted to a series regular and appeared in the opening credits beginning with the episode "The Santa in the Slush". He also guest-starred on the spin-off The Finder. The character is killed off in the first episode of the show's tenth season, "The Conspiracy in the Corpse".

== Early life ==
Little is revealed about Sweets' birth parents. In "Double Trouble In The Panhandle", Sweets reveals that his birth mother was a psychic working in a circus in South Florida; upon reaching the age of majority he attempted to track her down, but could gain no information from the insular circus community. Before being adopted he was in foster care. He lived in four foster homes by the time he was adopted at age six by the Finleys. He mentioned that he was beaten by a foster dad "for sport" and the whip scars are still visible on his back. His loving, but elderly, adoptive parents died shortly before Dr. Sweets began working with Booth and Brennan, leaving him without a family. Sweets' relationship with his adoptive parents, however, left him with the belief that broken people can be saved by people with good hearts, inspiring him to become a psychologist. Most of this was uncovered by Dr. Gordon Wyatt in reading Sweets' manuscript on Booth and Brennan's working relationship, stating that works like his often reveal more about the writer than the subject matter. He correctly deduces that Sweets was adopted as a child and suffered some sort of abuse. Details about his life as a teenager are few; but the episode "Mayhem on a Cross" reveals that he had been a fan of death metal as a teenager, which he still listens to after a bad day.

Sweets is highly educated and intelligent despite his youth, holding two doctorates despite only being 22 years old when he made his first appearance in the show. He completed his undergraduate degree at the University of Toronto and has a master's degree in Abnormal Psychology from Temple University and two doctorates (Clinical Psychology and Behavioral Analysis) from Columbia University and the University of Pennsylvania. To have reached this level of education, Sweets must have begun college at age 14 or 15, attending for three years before obtaining his master's degree in (roughly one or two years) and then his doctorates within three years. This has led some members of the team to doubt his degrees' validity, and Sweets has admitted to Brennan that he earned money for graduate school by teaching psychological techniques to car salesmen — a fact that he is not proud of.

== Work ==
It is not known when Sweets officially joined the FBI or what his previous occupation, if any, was prior to joining the Bureau. He did mention that he was an intern at a mental health facility in Philadelphia, possibly coinciding with his time as a graduate student at Temple University or the University of Pennsylvania. Like his colleague FBI agent Seeley Booth, he is based at the J. Edgar Hoover Building and can be usually found in his consultation room. He occasionally accompanies Booth to interview victims' family members or analyze a crime scene for insight into a suspect.

Sweets' young age and youthful appearance has posed a problem for him at work as other agents sometimes do not take him seriously. When they first met each other Booth conjectured that the worst thing that had ever happened to Sweets was that he "lost at Mortal Kombat". He is usually known to other agents, including Booth, as "the shrink". When he and Booth first worked together, Booth often treated him in a condescending manner and would refer to or address him as "The Shrink", amongst other humorous variations, instead of his actual name. Likewise, Agent Olivia Sparling, a rookie agent he was paired with when Booth was unavailable, viewed him with disdain upon their first meeting but was also won over by his skill. On occasion Booth will pull rank and trick Sweets into doing an interrogation or unwanted tasks (mostly paperwork, going over documents or speaking to annoying suspects) for him, much to Sweets' chagrin. After Sweets received his badge in season 7, Booth still introduced him as "Dr. Sweets" so that the latter would be taken seriously.

Sweets appears to be formally trained as a psychoanalytic psychologist, often referencing Freudian theories and approaches, even describing the psychosexual stages of childhood development to Booth. Ironically, Dr. Wyatt notes that "Freud has been largely discredited" in "Mayhem on a Cross", but still shows a great amount of respect and support towards Sweets. Despite his age, Sweets' expertise is recognized and, often grudgingly, appreciated by Booth and the team. In more complicated cases or when dealing with difficult suspects he has been the only one able to offer any insight or get through to the suspect. He was also the first to correctly deduce murderer Christopher Pelant's real motives after the Jeffersonian team kept hitting dead ends with the physical evidence.

Sweets began seeing Brennan and Booth in "The Secret in the Soil". Through Fox Online Special Features, it is implied Booth and Brennan continue to see Dr. Wyatt through "The Soccer Mom and the Mini-Van" before seeing Sweets solely. Initially, the pair do not regard Sweets seriously, Booth for his youth and Brennan for his profession. Over time, however, they recognize his skill in profiling and even develop a friendship with him, comforting him after his girlfriend April breaks up with him and later recognizing that Sweets wishes to continue studying them because he likes them. The relationship of Booth and Bones with Sweets continued to grow, and he developed a father/son relationship with Booth. He becomes closer to Booth and Brennan after a moment during "Mayhem on a Cross" when they share their traumatic pasts, eventually becoming a surrogate family and hiding their emotional bond with banter. Sweets has also started appearing more frequently in the field; notably, undercover as Angela's aspiring-fireman-husband-with-a-bad-back, to gain information on a suspect without a warrant.

During his study of Booth and Brennan, Sweets began to write a book about them. In the episode "Mayhem on a Cross", Dr. Sweets received a review by Dr. Gordon Wyatt of his book on the relationship between Booth and Brennan. Dr. Wyatt explained that he felt Sweets had misinterpreted the relationship between Booth and Brennan by looking on a somewhat superficial level. The work primarily focused how Booth and Brennan are opposites and that their sexual attraction is limited because their primary responsibility is to their careers. Dr. Wyatt explains he feels Booth and Brennan are much more similar than Sweets understands and that one of the two is, in fact, aware of the underlying sexual tension between them and struggles with it daily. After learning about Booth and Brennan's backgrounds, he concludes that Sweets' "near obsession" with them and writing the book was a way of finding his place in the world and that he has created his emotional connection with them as a way of finding a family, something Brennan compares to "imprinting" like a baby duck. It is revealed in "The Dwarf in the Dirt" that Sweets has not published his book, because he fears how Booth and Brennan would respond to the book's conclusion that they are in love with each other. He asks Wyatt, now a chef, if he has the right to publish his book when Booth and Brennan cannot even admit to themselves that they are in love, but Wyatt tells him he left psychiatry so he would not have to deal with a dilemma like this.

During the time frame between Seasons 5 and 6 Sweets takes a sabbatical from the FBI while Dr. Brennan and Daisy went to the Maluku Islands, Booth was deployed to Afghanistan and Angela and Hodgins traveled to Paris. He was reluctant to return after calling off his engagement with Daisy but prosecutor Caroline Julian tricked him into returning by calling him up saying that Booth had returned with "posttraumatic stress syndrome" and needed psychological help (which was not true).

In Season 9 he takes a brief sabbatical but returns in several episodes to assist with Booth's cases. After Booth kills Pelant, Sweets returns permanently, only to find that the department has acquired a new computerized profiling system called VAL and linked it to Dr. Camille Saroyan's office at the Jeffersonian. Throughout the episode "The Lady on the List", he makes his displeasure known to Booth and Cam, who comments to Sweets that he "may as well hate a transistor radio". Booth eventually shuts his VAL down when physical evidence disproved its analysis, stating that he still prefers Sweets to a computer.

In Season 7, Sweets decided to earn his firearms qualifications, which likely meant that he was not a sworn special agent as FBI regulations require special agents to be armed. He stated that he wanted to back Booth up in light of the number of violent suspects Booth has to deal with on a regular basis and the fact that he also regularly accompanies Booth out into the field. At first Booth was skeptical and told Bones, "it's crazy for [Sweets] to own a gun". Unable to dissuade him, Booth "called in a favor" to take over as range master for Sweets' test stating that since Sweets wants to back him up, he needed to see for himself that he could trust Sweets with his back. Sweets was grazed by a bullet during the test but passed. In Season 9 he makes his first arrest, indicating that he has special agent status even though he is never addressed as such.

== Relationships ==
Sweets had a relationship with Daisy Wick, an intern at the Jeffersonian. He asked her to marry him and later they broke up. At the beginning of the program's tenth season, Sweets is revealed to have impregnated Wick sometime prior to that episode.

=== Colleagues ===
As a psychologist, Sweets' initial relationships with the main cast are as that of an advisor, and he often tries to help others, even when his aid is unwanted. Despite this, all of the main characters have gone to him for advice, usually more than once, and have developed some sort of friendship with him, although some (particularly Hodgins and Booth) once viewed him as a bit annoying.

Sweets confesses that he had a secret thing for Angela, mentioning in Booth's coma about Daisy. Hodgins misinterprets his revelation as a declaration love for Angela, and replies, "Angela? You don't have a chance with Angela." But, after being intimidated by her father in "The Science in the Physicist," Sweets loses interest.

Despite his aptitude for behavioral analysis, he believed for a time that all the members of the team hated him.

After Zack Addy was admitted to a psychiatric hospital for committing a murder, Sweets became his therapist and, until his death, saw him on a regular basis. Initially, Sweets believes that Zack does not feel guilty enough about murder and that he should feel less guilty about being taken in by Gormogon's rhetoric. However, in "The Perfect Pieces in the Purple Pond", Zack reveals that he is innocent of murder and simply provided Gormogon with information. Although Sweets wishes to reveal this to Brennan and Booth, Zack invokes patient confidentiality, knowing that he would be prosecuted as an accessory to murder and believes that he would not fare well in prison.

==== Seeley Booth ====
Although Booth is initially disrespectful of Sweets due to his youth, the two eventually develop a friendship, albeit one that is, for a time, pressed by Sweets' interest in Booth's past as an abused child and Booth's dismissive treatment of Sweets. Booth does, however, recognize Sweets' skill as a profiler and often takes Sweets along to conduct interrogations and analyze a victim or suspect's personal effects for some insight. Throughout the fourth season, the two develop a father/son relationship, something that is especially obvious when Sweets turns to Booth for advice about his girlfriend in "The Cinderella in the Cardboard". This is again apparent when Sweets doubts Booth's trust in him when Booth consults Dr. Wyatt over himself when he discovers that, following his operation, he is no longer the expert marksman he once was. However, Wyatt points out that Booth taking Sweets into interrogations was evidence of Booth's implicit trust in him, while Booth merely avoided discussing his potentially work-related issue with Sweets because Sweets' first loyalty would be to the FBI and he did not want to create a conflict of interest for him because he was too fond of him. In "The Critic in the Cabernet" when Booth is in the hospital, Sweets is visibly upset and emotional about Booth's predicament.

Booth also seems to have a grudging respect for Sweets's skill as a psychologist. Although Booth is unenthusiastic about their regular appointments, he occasionally seeks Sweets's advice and even asked him for help with Parker. On other occasions, Booth has asked for Sweets's help during investigations, even explicitly recommending him to Cam on one occasion. In the beginning of the fifth season, Sweets observes that Booth is in love with Brennan, but Sweets intervenes, believing that his attraction is a by-product of the alternate world he experienced during his coma. He warns Booth that the attraction may not be real and that he should not act on his feelings as he may later fall out of love and hurt Brennan. Although Booth initially disregards him, he later seems to realize the validity of his advice and ultimately decides not to tell Brennan that he is in love with her.

==== Temperance Brennan ====
Sweets has a good friendship with Brennan, despite her disdain for his profession. When Brennan sees Sweets' girlfriend, Daisy, trying on a bridal gown with another man, Brennan states that she likes Sweets and can't bring herself to lie to him because she thinks she can spare him some emotional pain. Later, after learning that Sweets was abused as a child, she shares a part of her own pained childhood with him in an attempt to connect with him. Prior to this, Sweets has made his own attempts to develop a friendship with Brennan, even asking on one occasion to call her "Bones" after she protects him from an attacker, although his request is promptly denied as the moniker was reserved exclusively for Booth. Later on, during "The Night in the Bones Museum", Brennan agrees to rehire Daisy when Sweets says he would take it as a personal favor, possibly as a result of her affection for him.

Brennan's dislike of psychology does, however, occasionally cause friction in their relationship. Like Booth, she eventually, and grudgingly, developed a respect for Sweets' profession. In "The Beaver in the Otter", Sweets notices three frat boys that were feigning their grief for their late frat brother. When Brennan learns he used psychology to deduce this, she says that he had simply 'guessed', upsetting Sweets. At the end of the episode, Sweets is able to uncover the killer, but when Brennan again asks him how, he simply says that Brennan won't believe him and that he 'guessed', revealing that her words had hurt him. On occasion, however, Brennan will admit to the uses of psychology, such as when she asked Sweets to help her learn to read people the same way Booth does. Additionally, in the episode "The Beautiful Day in the Neighborhood", Sweets attempts to understand why three people killed their neighbor. He explains that, although it is not necessary to the case, he wants that insight into the human mind, something that Brennan accepts and respects. There is, however, one aspect of Sweets' psychological training that Brennan seems to continually respect: his ability to discern lies, acknowledging that physical reactions can indicate dishonesty. Her respect for this ability is most apparent at the end of "The Tough Man in the Tender Chicken", when she suggests using Sweets as a "human polygraph test" in Booth's place when they realize that Booth's own ability to detect dishonesty has been compromised since his coma. When Booth tells Brennan that his marksmanship skill has fallen since his coma, she immediately suggests talking to Sweets and later tells Sweets of the many discrepancies in Booth's behavior since the coma.

Brennan continued to see Sweets as a family friend even after starting a family with Booth. He stayed with them for several months after he broke up with Daisy and when he was about to move into his new apartment, Brennan expressed her sadness that Sweets would no longer be there to help babysit Christine or share his recipes. When Booth was wrongfully imprisoned after the season 9 finale, Sweets took over Booth's fatherly duties and regularly took Christine to the park and also helped Brennan move into the new house.

==== Dr. Gordon Wyatt ====
Sweets has developed a friendly relationship with Dr. Gordon Wyatt, who in turn mentors Sweets and offers him guidance at times. Gordon has shown great respect for Sweets and his skill as a psychologist. Gordon also seems to be fairly protective of Sweets, particularly during "Mayhem on a Cross". Through Sweets' manuscript, Gordon was able to deduce that Sweets himself had been abused as a child and was adopted by an elderly couple who had recently died. He tells Sweets that he has a good heart and a genuine desire to help others that makes psychology his true calling, something that Gordon himself does not have. Later in the episode, while he is preparing a dinner for Brennan and Booth, he tells them of Sweets' past and encourages them to include him in their surrogate family.

=== Romances ===
Sweets dated April, a tropical fish specialist, until she broke up with him in "The Man in the Mud".

==== Daisy Wick ====
Sweets begins dating one of Dr. Temperance Brennan's interns, Daisy Wick, after meeting her during a case. He is initially drawn to her by the fact that she minored in psychology and later, after Booth and Brennan avoid another therapy session, calls her. At the end of "The Skull in the Sculpture", Sweets insists on personally breaking the news to her when Cam decides to fire her, telling Daisy that the upside of it is that they no longer must be discreet about their relationship. When Daisy confesses she thought that Sweets was ashamed of her, he kisses her in front of the entire team, surprising them all greatly.

In "The Cinderella In The Cardboard", Daisy is viewed fitting a wedding dress with an unknown male by Booth and Brennan. After much deliberation, Sweets confronts her, at which point they quickly resolve the fact that Daisy is not having an affair, and she was simply fitting the dress for her cousin, and the unknown male was her cousin's fiancé. At that point, Daisy closes the blinds to Sweets's office and they begin disrobing as the camera pans to another point of view.

In "Night in the Bones Museum", Sweets intercedes on Daisy's behalf and persuades Dr Brennan to offer Daisy another chance at the internship although she has been fired twice already; although not from lack of ability but rather the fact that she is "annoying". He teaches her breathing techniques to make her less so, but she begins to resent his constant presence at the lab. He realizes that his trying to change her was insulting, and resolves that if she ever fails in future, he will just "give [her] a hug". Daisy and Sweets then have sex in the Egyptology department.

In "The Bones On The Blue Line", Sweets proposes to Daisy, and she accepts. Though when she decides to go to the Maluku Islands on a year-long anthropological dig, they break up when he refuses to join her.

However, in the episode "The Shallow in the Deep", Daisy and Sweets are revealed to have been having casual sex; Booth and Brennan accidentally stumbled on them having sex in Sweets' office as Booth needed Sweets to sign his ready-for-duty form. Sweets realizes that he wants a stable relationship, and he and Daisy reconnect in a bar by realizing that they are not so different after all. They are shown near the end of the episode kissing. Later on in the season it is revealed that Sweets is planning on proposing to Daisy again.

Daisy's nickname for Lance is her "Sweet Lancelot", a reference to his name, Lance Sweets, and to the romantic character, Lancelot, of Arthurian myth. Sweets also sometimes refers to Daisy as "Miss Daisy", also using the phrase "What are you driving at, Miss Daisy?" in reference to the film, "Driving Miss Daisy".

In the Season 8 episode "The Gunk in the Garage", Sweets turns down a fellow FBI agent, Olivia Sparling, who is obviously interested in him, citing his serious relationship with Daisy; however, in the following episode, "The Tiger in the Tale", he and Daisy encounter trouble in their relationship.

Sweets and Daisy plan to finally move in together and rent an apartment. Though both are excited about this at first, after talking with both Angela and Booth, Sweets begins to second-guess living with Daisy, realizing that, though she wants to eventually get married, and even someday start a family; all the things he wasn't entirely sure about yet. As a result, Sweets, despite feeling bad, breaks off their relationship, and allows Daisy to keep the apartment. Though the two had a moment of reminiscing, they remained friends. Before the end of the season, Sweets actually thought Daisy missed him. She was flattered and admitted she missed him and the sex, a little.

In the Season 10 premiere, it is revealed that he and Daisy reconnected over the past year. The reconciliation of their relationship resulted in her pregnancy. She's seen approximately 5 months pregnant with their son; whom she calls "Little Lance" affectionately. Sweets is killed later in the episode. One of his last thoughts was of Daisy and he requested Dr. Brennan to tell her "not to worry", stating she worried too much. Prior to his death, Sweets and Daisy ask Booth to be their unborn son's godfather, and Sweets even wanted to name the baby 'Seeley'.

== Characterization ==
Lance Sweets is brought into the series early in the third season ("The Secret in the Soil") as a psychologist to Seeley Booth and Temperance Brennan. The FBI forced them to seek therapy because Booth had arrested Brennan's father and the FBI was considering severing their partnership. Sweets' presence provides a bit of comic relief, as he is often the target of insults from both his clients, though they do show sympathy for him on occasion. His youth (according to Angela, Sweets needs to show his ID at bars to drink) and inexperience with police work also prove to be a challenge for him in the series, as many don't take him seriously, although his psychological analysis of Booth and Brennan is typically quite accurate. Booth is very suspicious of his ability to predict behavior using psychoanalysis, calling it "Jedi mind tricks". Also, while able to quickly recognize when someone is lying (Booth has described him as a "portable polygraph"), he himself does not appear to be very good at lying; when he lied about his personal life in "Double Trouble in the Panhandle", both Booth and Brennan were able to tell easily.

Sweets is characterized as extremely intelligent and he has often been able to provide much-needed insight into a case when the Jeffersonian team hit a dead end with physical evidence. He is generally well-liked and valued by the "squints" despite Brennan's dislike of psychology and Hodgins' incessant jibes about his youthful appearance. Hodgins, Angela and Cam have all asked him for advice at least once in the show.

Besides his academic intellect and skill as a profiler, Sweets has various interests outside of psychology. A skilled chess player, he was also one of the youngest chessmasters in the federation which he was a member of during his college days. He is musically-inclined and plays the piano (as does actor John Francis Daley); in during the time frame between Seasons 5 and 6 he takes a sabbatical when Booth, Brennan, Angela, Hodgins and Daisy leave Washington DC for a year and becomes a freelance pianist. He is also well-read and familiar with William Shakespeare.

In the season 4 finale, "The End in the Beginning", he is presented as a bartender ("practically a psychologist") and the lead singer and keyboardist of a band called "Gormogon", a reference to a character in a previous story arc. He states he is not Gormogon and that it is simply a name; this may be a nod to a belief that many fans held that Sweets was, in fact, Gormogon. Even in this alternate world, Booth is still a father figure to Sweets, giving him the opportunity to audition at the nightclub, and Sweets is still in a relationship with Daisy. He is also protective of Brennan, having burnt evidence that he thought would implicate her.

== Death ==
In the final moments of the premiere episode of season 10, "The Conspiracy in the Corpse", Booth and Bones arrive to a parking garage after Booth received a distress call from junior FBI agent James Aubrey. They arrive to find Sweets lying on the ground and bleeding out with massive internal trauma. Also on the scene is Aubrey, who arrived moments after the incident, after hearing the shots Sweets fired at his assailant. After Booth and Bones seek to keep a delirious and fading Sweets from expiring, he finally succumbs to his wounds and dies as an ambulance is heard arriving in the background. His last words to Brennan and Booth, are "The world is a lot better than you think it is. It's..."

Sweets was determined to have been killed by a Navy SEAL named Kenneth Emory, who was acting on the orders of Glen Durant — aka the President of the Shadow Government.
