= Gormogons =

18th Century secret society

The Ancient Noble Order of the Gormogons was a short-lived 18th century secret society formed by expelled Freemason Philip Wharton. It left no records or accomplishments to indicate its true goal and purpose. From the group's few published articles it is thought that the society's primary objective was to hold up Freemasonry to ridicule. During its brief existence it was accused of being a Jacobite-leaning group, perhaps because the first known Grandmaster (or Oecumenical Volgi) was Andrew Michael Ramsay of Ayr, Scotland, a Jacobite of strong convictions. It also appears to have been a charitable organization, at least according to its surviving bylaws. There are also some surviving pendant badges, bearing their sign.

== Possible etymology of the name ==
Jonathon Green suggests in Cassell’s Dictionary of Slang that, in the form gormagon, the word is a blend of gorgon and dragon, while the Oxford English Dictionary describes the etymology as "meaningless: pseudo Chinese."

In The 1811 Dictionary of the Vulgar Tongue, the word gormagon was humorously defined thus: "A monster with six eyes, three mouths, four arms, eight legs, five on one side and three on the other, three arses, two tarses [penises], and a **** upon its back." The compiler Francis Grose gave the game away in his dictionary entry by explaining that it was "a man on horseback, with a woman behind him". (His "five legs on one side" description could be merely that the woman was riding side-saddle).

In a 1724 entry in The London Post, the order was said to have been brought to London by a "Mandarin", who in turn initiated several "Gentlemen of Honor" into its ranks. Scholars offer differing accounts as to when this order became extinct. For instance, it was proposed that it ended in 1738. Another account maintained that it survived until 1799, when an Act was passed in July 12th of that year suppressing all secret societies with the exemption of Freemasonry.

== In popular culture ==
The Gormogons have been referenced in the TV show Bones. Beginning with the season 3 premiere, "The Widow's Son in the Windshield", the Jeffersonian team investigated a cannibalistic serial killer they call Gormogon, for his obsession with secret societies and his targeting of the Knights of Columbus.

== See also ==
- Secret society
- Gormogon (Bones)
