= The Finder (American TV series) =

2012 American procedural drama TV series

- Promotional poster
- Genre: Drama
- Created by: Hart Hanson
- Starring: Geoff Stults; Michael Clarke Duncan; Mercedes Mason; Maddie Hasson
- Theme music composer: John Fogerty
- Opening theme: "Swamp Water"
- Country of origin: United States
- Original language: English
- No. of seasons: 1
- No. of episodes: 13

Production
- Executive producers: Hart Hanson; Daniel Sackheim; Barry Josephson
- Production location: Florida
- Running time: 43 minutes
- Production companies: Josephson Entertainment; Far Field Productions; 20th Century Fox Television

Original release
- Network: Fox
- Release: January 12 – May 11, 2012

Related
- Bones

The Finder is an American procedural drama television series created by Hart Hanson that ran as a midseason replacement on Fox from January 12, 2012, to May 11, 2012. The series originally aired on Thursdays at 9:00 pm, and moved to Fridays at 8:00 pm beginning April 6, 2012. It is a spin-off of another Fox television series, Bones (also created by Hanson), where the backdoor pilot, a season-six episode entitled "The Finder", aired in April 2011. It is loosely based on The Locator series of two books (The Knowland Retribution and The Lacey Confession) by Richard Greener. On May 9, 2012, Fox cancelled the series after its one limited season. It would be one of Michael Clarke Duncan’s final screen appearances before his death in September 2012, four months after this series’ final episode.

== Cast and characters ==
- Geoff Stults is Major Walter Sherman, U.S. Army (retired). Due to a traumatic brain injury suffered in the Iraq War due to a roadside bomb explosion that only he survived, Walter is paranoid, suspicious, and quirky (he also says that he is "not exactly inhibited"), but it also somehow resulted in him now being able to find anything, seeing patterns where others would not. His brain uses "Walter math" to explain these things to him. In the backdoor pilot, in Bones, FBI Special Agent Seeley Booth calls Walter's gift "the Finder Power," while Leo Knox calls it "Darna Shellah" and "Akashvani." Because of his ability to find anything, many powerful and influential people now owe him favors. Walter's catchphrase, as such, is "I'ma risk it," where he often makes a decision even after Leo legally advises him otherwise. In the pilot, Booth and he are revealed to have "history" and knew each other from their days in the Army. He has a habit of sometimes taking before-and-after Polaroids of clients. Walter has the knack of also finding out things that his clients did not want to know by finding what people are really looking for, not just what they think they are looking for. According to Walter, in "The Boy with the Bucket," he was named, by his mother, after poet Walt Whitman. He is depicted as being younger than his literary counterpart, having never been married, nor having any children. Walter's original literary incarnation served in Vietnam and never suffered brain damage.
- Michael Clarke Duncan is Leo Knox, a widower and former attorney. He owns the bar "The Ends of the Earth," located on Looking Glass Key, and he also serves as Walter's manager and legal advisor, and sometimes bodyguard. Leo is also known for his quoting of religious literature, particularly Buddhism. He calls Walter's power "Darna Shellah" and "Akashvani." According to Leo, he owes Walter his life. In episode three, "A Cinderella Story," Leo is shown to have lost his family (his wife Nina and teenaged daughter Ellie), to E. coli poisoning. He is based on the character Leonard Martin in The Knowland Retribution, the first "Locator" book, on which the series was based.
- Mercedes Mason is Deputy U.S. Marshal Isabel Zambada. While Walter's antics frequently get on her nerves, Walter and she have a "friends with benefits" arrangement. Isabel has ambitions of being the first Latina United States attorney general. While she works as a deputy U.S. marshal during the day to gain field experience, she attends law school at night. Her intention is to be "eating dinner in the White House within six years."
- Maddie Hasson is Willa Monday, a Romani juvenile delinquent. Willa is very talented with computers, but she is prohibited from using a computer for the duration of her probation. While Willa has been betrothed to her "cousin" Timo since she was five and Timo was 10, by their mutual "uncle", Uncle Shad, the head of their family, Willa and Timo only love each other as brother and sister. As Willa believes in true love, she wants for Timo to be able to be with the girl he loves, Magdalena. At the end of the season, Willa goes on the run, violating her probation, to avoid her betrothal to Timo. They are not really cousins; it is just the Romani way to refer to one another as such, being the Romani "family".
- Toby Hemingway is Timo Proud, a Romani and Willa's "cousin". Timo is five years older than Willa, and he has a talent for tarot reading. While Timo and Willa have been betrothed, Timo is himself in love with a mutual "cousin" of theirs, Magdalena.

== Development and production ==
Fox developed a quasi-spin-off series for Bones that was built around a character introduced in the sixth season. The series was created by Bones creator/executive producer, Hart Hanson, and based on The Locator series of two books written by Richard Greener: The Knowland Retribution and The Lacey Confession. The eponymous Locator, changed to Finder for the television adaptation, is Walter Sherman; Walter is an eccentric, but amusing recluse in high demand for his ability to find anything. He is skeptical of everything. He suffered brain damage after being the sole survivor of a roadside bomb explosion, which explains his constant paranoia and compulsion to find things ("I was looking for an insurgent bomb maker. My job was to find him… he found me first… the explosion… killed six good men… now I either find it, or I die trying.") – and for asking offensive, seemingly irrelevant questions to get to the truth. Production on the episode began in early 2011.

Creator Hart Hanson posted on Twitter (in a humorous manner) regarding the notes he got from the network, "I received studio notes on the Bones spin-off idea. They want it to be better. Unreasonable taskmasters. Impossible dreamers. Neo-platonists."

The characters make their base at The Ends of the Earth bar, on the fictional Florida Keys island of Looking Glass Key. Geoff Stults was cast as the lead character with Michael Clarke Duncan and Saffron Burrows (as Ike Latulippe, bartender and pilot) in supporting roles. The three characters were introduced in episode 19 of season 6.

The Finder was picked up for the 2011–12 season on May 10, 2011, with an order of 13 episodes. The series premiered midseason 2012, airing on Thursdays at 9:00 pm ET, occupying the Bones time slot when it was on hiatus.

Saffron Burrows did not appear beyond the backdoor pilot episode, leaving the series, because the network decided to reconceive the role. Mercedes Masöhn and Maddie Hasson joined the cast as the two female leads. Masohn plays Isabel Zambada, a deputy U.S. marshal; and Hasson plays Willa, a juvenile delinquent who helps with their investigations.

== Episodes ==
No.	Title	Directed by	Written by	Original release date	Prod. code	US viewers (millions)
1	"An Orphan Walks Into a Bar"	Daniel Sackheim	Hart Hanson	January 12, 2012	1ATT01	5.50
After recovering one of John Fogerty’s (guest-starring as himself) beloved guitars, Iraq veteran Walter Sherman helps a teenaged boy (Brett Davern) locate his missing father, a military pilot and war hero whose plane vanished while on an undisclosed mission. Walter turns to Deputy U.S. Marshal Isabel Zambada for insider information on the missing colonel, which links the lost plane to a high-level drug dealer and its illegal cargo. When Walter and Leo discover this unlikely connection to the missing father, they not only locate the fallen aircraft, but they also uncover the real purpose of the flight, helping the boy find closure. Meanwhile, at The Ends of the Earth bar, co-owners Leo and Walter keep a watchful eye on Willa, a teenager parolee employed at the bar as part of her probation from juvenile detention.
2	"Bullets"	Terrence O'Hara	Matt MacLeod	January 19, 2012	1ATT05	6.58
Walter looks for the bullets that were involved in the murder of a police officer 20 years ago. Meanwhile, Dr. Lance Sweets looks into whether Walter is fit to participate in federally mandated investigations, all the while assisting Walt in these investigative endeavors.
3	"A Cinderella Story"	Adam Arkin	Sanford Golden & Karen Wyscarver	January 26, 2012	1ATT03	8.44
Walter's investigation of a missing shoe culminates in a fairytale ending.
4	"Swing and a Miss"	Kevin Hooks	Aaron Ginsburg & Wade McIntyre	February 2, 2012	1ATT04	6.87
Isabel’s new boyfriend, Frank (Lance Gross), an all-star baseball player, is robbed, and Walter steps in to help find his stolen collectibles. In the process, Walter learns Frank has lost something more meaningful than memorabilia. To earn Willa’s trust, Leo and Walter bring her in on the case.
5	"The Great Escape"	Seith Mann	Emilia Serrano	February 9, 2012	1ATT07	6.22
Preston Miller (Jonathan Slavin), a magician, seeks Walter's help in finding his assistant who vanished during a failed disappearing act. Alongside Special Agent Judy Green (guest star Ever Carradine), Walter and Leo find clues leading to a counterfeit money ring. Meanwhile, Leo enlists Isabel's help in looking after Willa.
6	"Little Green Men"	Dwight Little	Will Pascoe	February 23, 2012	1ATT09	6.18
The Jeffersonian's Dr. Jack Hodgins ropes Walter into searching for an "alien" spacecraft videotaped by an incoming space shuttle pilot, who is now dead. The credibility of the other pilot, Col. Bradshaw, whose reputation was harmed by a shadowy government agency for participating in the disclosure, lies in the balance. All is not as it seems, though, and Walter's life, family, and friends face a very real threat from a woman code-named Pope (Peta Wilson). Meanwhile, Willa and Timo attempt to get their marriage arrangement dissolved by the notorious Uncle Shad (Eric Roberts).
7	"Eye of the Storm"	Alex Chapple	Aaron Ginsburg & Wade McIntyre	March 8, 2012	1ATT10	7.08
The episode revolves around Hurricane Catherine, which is currently in Florida, and begins with Willa's probation officer (Amy Aquino) coming by the bar for an impromptu inspection of her living quarters. She ends up having to stay due to the harsh weather. Walter, being his paranoid self, boards the bar up and calmly begins preparing to stay in, going as far as making punch and asking Isabel to come over. It all gets interrupted, however, by a newsflash on TV about a missing girl. The hurricane forces Walter to find the girl while remaining in his bar.
8	"Life After Death"	David Boreanaz	Nkechi Okoro Carroll	April 6, 2012	1ATT08	4.03
When a DJ begins playing new songs from a rapper who was gunned down 10 years ago, Walter is hired to recover the music for the distributor. Walter, instead, decides to try finding the rapper despite all evidence pointing to his death. In the course of his investigation, Walter learns more about the dead rapper's final moments, and the origin of his songs. In the process, he is able to help the rapper's still-mourning family heal.
9	"The Last Meal"	Milan Cheylov	Josh Friedman	April 13, 2012	1ATT02	3.45
In the process of finding a specific culinary dish for a man and his wife's anniversary, Walter searches for the chef behind the dish and the source of its unique, smokey flavor. The investigation becomes tense when everyone at his bar ends up in a life-or-death situation between the "Smoke Monster" chef (a nickname Walter does not understand) and a mob boss.
10	"The Conversation"	Jim Hayman	Patrick Massett & John Zinman	April 20, 2012	1ATT06	4.31
Walter is asked by a young girl (Yara Shahidi) for help in finding her recently disappeared father. Initially uninterested, Walter takes on the case when he discovers the man had been talking with someone else just moments after calling his family. He teams up with Agent McHottie (Kelly Carlson), from the FBI Gang Unit. Meanwhile, Leo is depressed as the birthday of his daughter arrives, and he, once again, contemplates his desire for revenge.
11	"The Inheritance"	David Straiton	Sanford Golden & Karen Wyscarver	April 27, 2012	1ATT12	3.97
A friend of Isabel's (Mageina Tovah) asks for Walter's help in finding her father's killer. Walter refuses to search for the killer, but agrees to help find an inheritance left behind for the daughter.
12	"Voodoo Undo"	Daniel Sackheim	Matt MacLeod & Emilia Serrano	May 4, 2012	1ATT11	4.00
Shortly after a shoot-out, a notorious crime boss (Nestor Serrano) seeks Walter's help, but finds this job proves to be extra dangerous, primarily because he believes he is under a voodoo curse.
13	"The Boy with the Bucket"	Vahan Moosekian	Hart Hanson & Patrick Massett & John Zinman	May 11, 2012	1ATT13	4.19
After discovering that a painting he found four years prior was a forgery, Walter begins searching for the original, but Walter's brother Langston (George Stults) shows up with news that their father is dying. Their father tasks Walter with finding his ex, the boy's mom (Annette O'Toole), who happens to be in the Witness Protection Program, as his dying wish. Meanwhile, Willa struggles with her soon-to-be arranged marriage to Timo.

== Broadcast ==
In Canada, the show was simsubbed against the Fox broadcast in most areas on the Global Television Network from January 12, 2012. It premiered in New Zealand on TV3 NZ on March 22, 2012, in Australia on Network Ten from June 25, 2012 and in the UK on the Universal Channel on July 11, 2012 Australia's Network Ten only aired three episodes before pulling the series from the schedule, and lost broadcast rights in March 2016 without airing the remaining episodes.

The order of the episodes that aired differs from the order produced and intended. This does create some discontinuity in the events of the show, such as Timo and Leo meeting for the first time in the episode "The Conversation", despite the two having met and conversed in previously aired episodes; the mention of Willa not having access to the internet in the same episode, despite her probation officer allowing it two episodes before; or the creation of an "honor jar" for paying one's bill, since Willa is not permitted behind the bar, when Willa was behind the bar (and the honor jar present) in earlier episodes.

The series was released on Disney+ on May 20, 2022.

== See also ==
- The Dead Zone – A TV series about a man who gains psychic abilities during a coma after sustaining brain damage
- Tracker – A TV series about a man who finds people and things in order to earns the rewards offered for them
