= John Francis Daley =

American filmmaker and actor (born 1985)

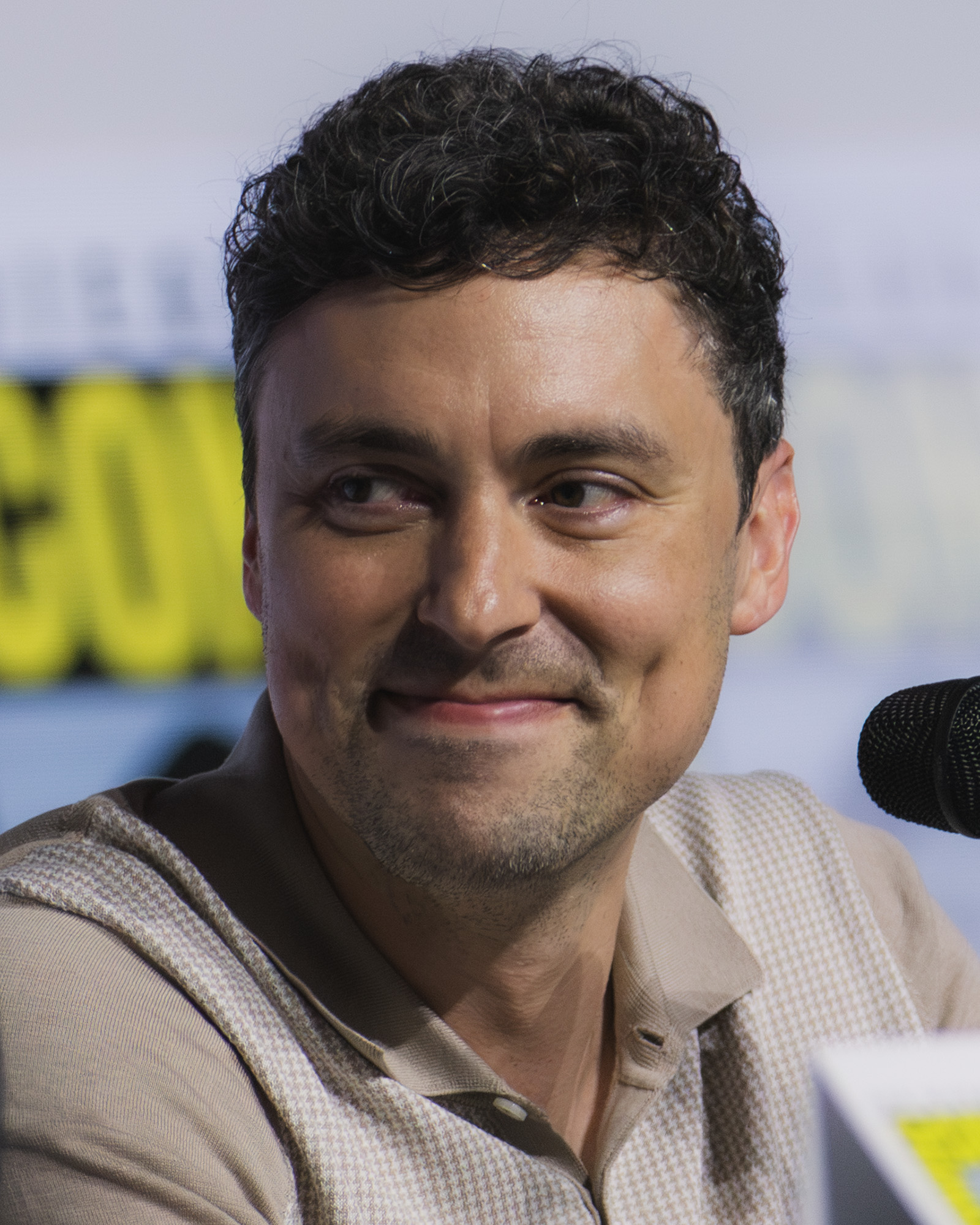
- Daley at the 2026 San Diego Comic Con
- Born: July 20, 1985 (age 41); Wheeling, Illinois, U.S.
- Occupations: Actor; film director; film producer; screenwriter
- Years active: 1998–present
- Spouse: Corinne Kingsbury (m. 2016)
- Children: 1

John Francis Daley (born July 20, 1985) is an American filmmaker and actor. He is best known for playing high school freshman Sam Weir on the NBC comedy-drama Freaks and Geeks and FBI criminal profiler Dr. Lance Sweets on the crime drama series Bones, for which he was nominated for a 2014 PRISM Award. He plays keyboards and sings for the band Dayplayer.

Daley is also known for his collaborative work with fellow writer and director Jonathan Goldstein, working on various films together. Daley and Goldstein's first work together was co-writing the comedy Horrible Bosses (2011), co-writers for The Incredible Burt Wonderstone (2013), co-story writing for Horrible Bosses 2 (2014), and co-writing/co-directing (in their directing debuts) the fifth film in the National Lampoon's Vacation film series, Vacation (2015). The duo were co-writers for Spider-Man: Homecoming (2017) with Jon Watts, Christopher Ford, Chris McKenna and Erik Sommers, and they co-directed the 2018 comedy Game Night and the 2023 fantasy Dungeons & Dragons: Honor Among Thieves.

== Early life ==
Daley is the son of R.F. Daley, an actor, and Nancy Daley, a piano teacher. His father is of Irish Catholic background, while his mother is Jewish. He grew up in Nyack, New York, where he played Danny in Nyack Middle School's production of Grease.

== Career ==
Daley began acting when he was cast as young Tommy in the U.S. and international tours of the Broadway hit The Who's Tommy. He played Sam Weir, protagonist of the "Geeks", in the television series Freaks and Geeks, and since then he has worked continuously in television, including series such as The Geena Davis Show, Boston Public, Regular Joe, Kitchen Confidential, Judging Amy, and Spin City. He was #94 on VH1's 100 Greatest Teen Stars.

In 2001, Daley co-directed a short film titled What Babies Do. He also wrote and starred in the comedy short Friday Night. In 2005, he appeared in the film Waiting... and in the Fox sitcom Kitchen Confidential. In 2007, Daley joined the cast of the Fox drama series Bones, portraying psychologist Lance Sweets. He co-wrote the season six episode "The Truth in the Myth" with his writing partner Jonathan Goldstein. Sweets was ultimately killed in the season 10 premiere; Bones executive producer Stephen Nathan said Sweets was killed because Daley wanted time off to direct a movie, and he was concerned that Daley's absence would be too long, especially if the directing job led to other jobs.

Daley was also featured in the music video for "Mercy Kiss" by Abandoned Pools.

In 2011, Daley and his writing partner Jonathan M. Goldstein wrote the black comedy Horrible Bosses. In 2013, Daley co-wrote The Incredible Burt Wonderstone with Goldstein; Daley also has a cameo in the film as a paramedic. In 2013, the two were hired to write Call of the Wild for DreamWorks Studios. John plays Ben House in Rapture-Palooza. Daley went on to write the story for the sequel to Horrible Bosses.

Daley and Goldstein co-wrote and co-directed the 2015 film Vacation, the latest installment of the National Lampoon's Vacation film series, starring Ed Helms and Christina Applegate.

Daley and Goldstein wrote the screenplay for the 2017 film Spider-Man: Homecoming with four other screenwriters, and were both considered to direct before Jon Watts was hired.

Daley and Goldstein directed the 2018 black comedy Game Night, based on a screenplay by Mark Perez. The film, starring Jason Bateman and Rachel McAdams, "earned a raft of glowing reviews for its whip-smart script, energetic performances, and deliberate avoidance of modern comedy's ubiquitous tropes," and grossed $117 million at the worldwide box office, versus a $37 million budget. While Daley and Goldstein did not receive screenwriter credit, they later said they rewrote "almost all of the original script's dialogue, totally overhauled the characters — most notably a creepy cop portrayed by Jesse Plemons — and comprehensively reworked the original script's third act."

In 2018, it was announced that the duo were set to direct a film adaptation of DC Comics' The Flash for their DC Extended Universe, but it was announced in July that they have left the project. Despite this, both Daley and Goldstein received story by credit alongside Joby Harold.

Goldstein and Daley wrote and directed the reboot of Dungeons & Dragons: Honor Among Thieves (2023).

Goldstein and Daley wrote and directed the 2026 action comedy Mayday, an original feature for Skydance and Apple that stars Ryan Reynolds and Kenneth Branagh.

== Filmography ==
=== Short films ===
Year	Title	Director	Writer
2001	What Babies Do	Yes	No
2011	Audio Tour	Yes	Yes

=== Feature films ===
Year	Title	Director	Writer	Producer
2005	Still Waiting	No		
2011	Horrible Bosses	No	Yes	No
2013	The Incredible Burt Wonderstone	No	Yes	No
2013	Cloudy with a Chance of Meatballs 2	No	Yes	No
2014	Horrible Bosses 2	No	Story	No
2015	Vacation	Yes	Yes	No
2017	Spider-Man: Homecoming	No	Yes	No
2018	Game Night	Yes	Uncredited	No
2019	Stuber	No	No	Yes
2021	Vacation Friends	No	Yes	No
2023	Dungeons & Dragons: Honor Among Thieves	Yes	Yes	Executive
2023	The Flash	No	Story	No
2025	A Minecraft Movie	No	Uncredited	No
2026	Mayday	Yes	Yes	Yes

Acting credits

Year	Title	Role	Notes
2000	Allerd Fishbein's in Love	Allerd Fishbein	Short film
2003	View from the Top	Rodney	
2005	Waiting...	Mitch	
2008	Burying the Ex	Zak	Original short film
2011	Horrible Bosses	Carter	
2013	The Incredible Burt Wonderstone	Paramedic	
2013	Rapture-Palooza	Ben	
2015	Dude Bro Party Massacre III	Ernest	Cameo role
2015	Vacation	Ride Operator	
2018	Game Night	Carter	
2022	5-25-77	Pat	

=== Television ===
Year	Title	Director	Writer	Producer	Notes
2011	Bones	No	Yes	No	Episode "The Truth in the Myth"
2019	In the Dark	Yes	Yes	Consulting	Episode "All About the Benjamin"
2021	Welcome to Georgia	No	Yes	Executive	
2024	Hysteria!	No	No	Executive	

Acting credits

Year	Title	Role	Notes
1999–2000	Freaks and Geeks	Sam Weir	18 episodes
2000–2001	Boston Public	Anthony Ward	5 episodes
2000–2001	The Geena Davis Show	Carter Ryan	22 episodes
2001	The Ellen Show	Erik	Episode: "Walden Pond"
2001	The Kennedys	Anthony	TV movie
2002	Spin City	Spencer	Episode: "Eyes Wide Open"
2003	Regular Joe	Grant Binder	5 episodes
2004	Judging Amy	Jace Crosby	Episode: "Roadhouse Blues"
2005–2006	Kitchen Confidential	Jim	13 episodes
2006	Stacked	Kevin	Episode: "The Third Date"
2007	The Call	Tom	TV movie
2007–2014	Bones	Dr. Lance Sweets	138 episodes
2010	Yo Gabba Gabba!	Himself	Episode: "Flying"
2012	The Finder	Dr. Lance Sweets	Episode: "Bullets"
2015	Bottom's Butte	Scott and Cabana Boy	Voice
2016	Fresh Off the Boat	Jordan	Episode: "Rent Day"
2019	Drunk History	James J. Andrews	Episode: "Behind Enemy Lines"

== Awards and nominations ==
Year	Award	Category	Nominated work	Result
2000	YoungStar Awards	Best Young Ensemble Cast – Television (shared with the cast)	Freaks and Geeks	Nominated
2000	YoungStar Awards	Best Young Actor/Performance in a Comedy TV Series	Freaks and Geeks	Nominated
2000	Young Artist Awards	Best Performance in a TV Series – Young Ensemble (shared with the cast)	Freaks and Geeks	Nominated
2001	Young Artist Awards	Best Performance in a TV Comedy Series – Supporting Young Actor	The Geena Davis Show	Nominated
2014	British Academy Children's Awards	Kids' Vote – Feature Film	Cloudy with a Chance of Meatballs 2	Nominated
2015	People's Choice Awards	Favorite TV Character We Miss Most	Bones	Nominated
2018	Georgia Film Critics Association Awards	Oglethorpe Award for Excellence in Georgia Cinema	Spider-Man: Homecoming	Nominated
2019	Georgia Film Critics Association Awards	Oglethorpe Award for Excellence in Georgia Cinema	Game Night	Nominated
2024	Hugo Awards	Best Dramatic Presentation – Long Form	Dungeons & Dragons: Honor Among Thieves	Won
