= Forensic arts =

Art used in law enforcement or legal proceedings

Forensic art is any art used in law enforcement or legal proceedings. Forensic art is used to assist law enforcement with the visual aspects of a case, often using witness descriptions and video footage.

It is a highly specialized field that covers a wide range of artistic skills, such as composite drawing, crime scene sketching, image modification and identification, courtroom drawings, demonstrative evidence, and postmortem and facial approximation aids. It is rare for a forensic artist to specialize in more than one of these skills.

Many forensic artists do the job as a collateral duty to their "regular" job in law enforcement, such as police officer, crime scene tech, etc. Such forensic artists perform their work while on a fixed salary and are not additionally compensated for artistic duties. There are few full-time forensic artist jobs available. Most full-time artists work in large cities, or in state or federal agencies. "Freelancing" in forensic art is a difficult career path, as ties to law enforcement are a necessary part of the job, and agencies have limited budgets to pay outside contractors.

The skill of facial approximation is closely associated and related to forensic anthropology in that an artist specializes in the reconstruction of the remains of a human body. Generally this discipline focuses on the human face for identification purposes. The forensic artist can create a facial approximation in a number of ways to include 2D (drawings), 3D (sculptures) and other methods using new computer technology. Forensic artists generally can add greater character and make their subjects come back to "life".

== Types of forensic arts and methods ==
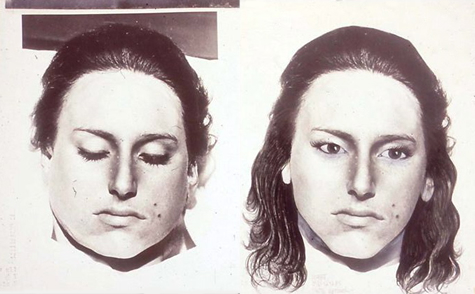
Example of postmortem drawing by Harvey Pratt, of Pamela Buckley, the Sumter County Jane Doe, who remained unidentified until 2021.

The following is a quick description of different forensic arts skills and what they involve:

- Composite sketching: the main objective is to help investigators generate leads based on physical descriptions. This is usually drawn by hand; an artist who is trained in interviewing victims and witnesses uses the information provided to draw what is described. Composite art produces a single, graphic image that is designed to be a likeness or similarity of the individual.
- Image modification: this is used to change and enhance a photograph in order to help an investigator and/or trial attorney. Examples of this include age progression/regression (see below), and the clarifying of images, such as from CCTV footage, to identify an individual.
- Image identification: this is the recording a person's distinguishing features for future reference. Investigators can use this tool to identify suspects who attempt to change their appearance to evade capture, as well as in the study of cold cases in which individuals may have changed their appearance since the event.
- Crime Scene Sketching: the drawing of a crime scene; in the sketch, an investigator includes measurements and dimensions to aid in displaying the layout of the scene. This helps support the information shown in photographs of the scene.
- Demonstrative evidence: any visible, physical evidence used in legal proceedings. These are used to demonstrate aspects of the case, reconstruct an event, and illustrate what happened. There are two categories of demonstrative evidence; court displays and investigative aids.
- Postmortem drawing: when an artist either looks at a deceased person's photograph or their remains to help identify who the person is and what they looked like prior to their death. This helps most in cases where the body is too damaged by an accident or decomposition.
- Age progression/regression: useful to determine what a person's appearance before or after a period of time. This is most commonly used in missing persons cases or during cold cases when investigators need an idea of what an individual looked like years prior to or following the investigation.
- Forensic sculpture: this is used to create three-dimensional models, usually using the skull of the victims. Other features are added such as fake eyes and wigs to add realism. This process can also inform the investigators of certain characteristics of the victim - such as age, race, and gender—through a detailed knowledge of the intricacies of skeletal structure and other corresponding features such as dental records. It is later photograph and used like postmortem and composite drawings. However, because forensic sculpture relies heavily on assumptions made by the artist, it is not considered a legally recognized technique for positive identification, and is thus used in an advisory capacity only.
- Collaboration: forensic artists, anthropologists and other professions are used to help determine the age, sex, and race of an identified skull.

== Composite sketching ==
Composite sketching is arguable the most fundamental example of forensic art. Lois Gibson, the most successful forensic artist leading to identify 750+ criminals, does composite drawings of perpetrators using a witnesses description. The first steps to making a sketch is to talk to a witness or victim. Interviewing the witness is half the job because they often want to forget the event due to trauma, so forensic artist must be gentle enough to coax descriptions out of the witness. When drawing, the artist ask for details, such as the hair color and style, eye shape and color, the shape and proportion of the nose and the mouth, and any particular facial expression. The artist usually will have a catalogue of visual aids that have individual parts of a person's face, with the most common being the FBI Facial Identification Catalogue. Next are any hairstyles, tattoos, scars, and clothes from the shoulders up. Clothing is usually remembered more than the face, and sometimes unique accessories like glasses or a bright hoodie can lead to a person's arrest. While the artist ask for some specifics, they tend to leave the drawing rather vague, as more calls and hints are made if the sketch kind of resembles a person than if it were to be an exact match to the person. Throughout the process, a suggestion about the look of the person being drawn must never be made. Some common drawing mistakes made by beginners are the shading of the nose, giving it depth, and the shape of the eyes. While it started out with a pencil and piece of paper, which some people still use, there is now also the option of using tablets or touchpads with a wireless pen. Around 10%-30% of sketches actually lead to a suspect's capture. While composite sketching may be helpful in identifying some people, it cannot be used in court as a piece of evidence, and the same goes for other facial recreations.

== Methods of manual 3D construction ==
Anthropometric, the study of measurements and proportions of the human body, was a method developed by Alphonse Bertillon.

A good start to all manual 3D construction is the actual shape of the person's actual skull. It is ideal to get a copy of the skull due to small structural differences between each person, and the fragility of using the actual skull of the person. Holes are covered to prevent damage to the actual skull and silicone is gently applied in layers, letting each layer dry as to not damage the previous one.

The Manchester method, also known as the anatomical method, is a form of 3D facial construction that is the most widely accepted. It was started by Richard Neave, who sculpts the facial muscles first, then adds a layer of clay as the skin, while also using tissue depth markers.

The American method was invented by Betty Pat. Gatliff. The reconstruction is straightforward by replicating the tissue depths using clay, skipping the facial muscles, and is as successful as Mikhail Gerasimov and Richard Neave.

Now, there is also computerized 3D forensic facial reconstruction. Manual model clay techniques are used within this method, but the computer systems vary, in that some computerized systems used 3D animation software to model the face onto the skull, while other systems use a virtual sculpture system with Haptic feedback. Haptic feedback is the ability to feel the surface of the skull during analysis and also provide important skeletal details for facial reconstruction such as muscle attachment strength, position of eye, position of malar tubercle etc.

== Face model reconstruction ==
Face model reconstruction is the process of building a computer model of a person's face, often from scans or images.

When creating a face model, the forensic artist looks at whether the person is masculine or feminine, as well as their skin tone, age, wrinkles, freckles, the shadow of the beard, and attractiveness. There are three segments they examine, the first being face shape. Some common features being checked are if the head is round, narrow or a heart shape, has high or low cheeks, has a high or low chin, possible a double chin, and the distance between lips and nose. The second segment is the eyes. Are they round, pointing upwards or downwards, eye color, thickness or thinness of eyebrows, whether the arch is high or low, the distance between the eyeballs, the distance between both eyebrows, and the distance between eyebrows and the eyes. The third segment is the hair. The 3D models have not been programmed to be used with hair, therefore, hair cannot be used the same way as facial attributes. A profile and frontal image of a person is used where five to 15 different key features of each hairstyle are selected. These different hairstyles features are from a database used by these professionals. The styles are put into the system where the algorithm automatically estimates the structure of the face. The system is also able to depict different shades of color.

== Sources ==
- Gibson, Lois (2008). Forensic Art Essentials. doi:10.1016/B978-0-12-370898-4.X5001-5. ISBN 978-0-12-370898-4.
