= Ian Toynton =

British-American director, producer and editor

- Born: 22 April 1946 (age 79)
- Occupation(s): Television director, producer, editor

Ian Toynton (born 1946) is a British-American television director, producer and editor.

== Early life and education ==
Toynton was educated at Haberdashers' Aske's Boys' School, Elstree.

== Career in television ==
Toynton is an Executive Producer/Director who started his TV career in the UK before moving to the States in the mid nineties. He has directed almost two hundred hours of television drama and has been nominated for a Primetime Emmy Award for 24 and has a British Academy of Film and Television Arts nomination for the British mini-series 'Widows'.

He also writes the children's illustrated book series 'Hooligan Bear'.
