= Hart Hanson =

American television producer and writer

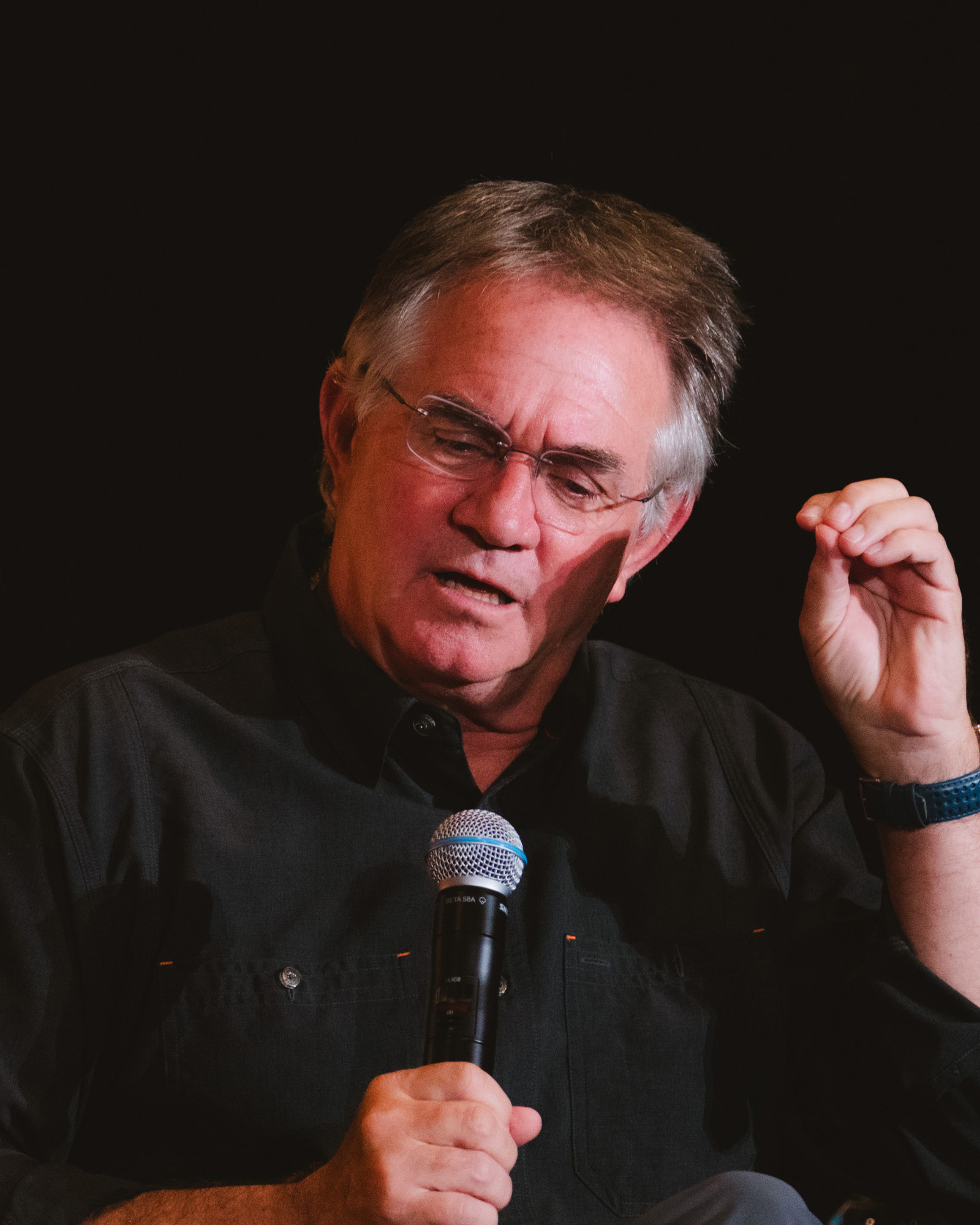
- Hart Hanson in 2025
- Born: July 26, 1957 (age 68); Burlingame, California, U.S.
- Education: University of Toronto (BA); University of British Columbia (MFA)
- Occupations: Writer, producer

Hart Hanson (born July 26, 1957) is an American-born television writer and producer, as well as an author. He is best known as the creator, executive producer, and writer of the TV series Bones.

== Biography ==
Hanson's family moved to Canada when he was a child. He received a BA from the University of Toronto and a MFA from the University of British Columbia, where he taught briefly. Hanson moved into Canadian television in the early 1990s, writing on a variety of dramas, including Neon Rider,The Odyssey, and Traders. He jumped to American productions later that decade, working on The Outer Limits and Stargate SG-1, among others.

Bones was developed during the latter part of the pitching season of 2004 when 20th Century Fox approached Hanson. Hanson was asked to meet Barry Josephson, who had purchased the rights to produce a documentary on forensic anthropologist Kathy Reichs. Hanson later also created and wrote its spinoff, The Finder.

In February 2013, Entertainment Weekly reported that Hanson would be writing about an "overweight, offensive cop" on FOX's television show, Backstrom.

Hanson wrote The Driver, a novel released by Dutton on August 8, 2017, and named by The New York Times as one of the best crime novels of 2017. It centers on limousine driver and war veteran Michael Skellig, who protects a sports mogul from assassins.

In 2019, Hanson joined a host of other writers in firing their agents as part of the Writers Guild of America's stand against the Association of Talent Agents and the practice of packaging.

He considers himself a lapsed Catholic.

== Filmography ==
- African Skies (1991), writer
- Candles, Snow & Mistletoe (1993), writer
- Trust in Me (1994), writer
- Guitarman (1994), writer
- Whale Music (1994), story editor
- Nobody's Business (1995), writer
- Expert Witness (2003), executive producer

=== Television ===
- Neon Rider (1991), Writer
- The Odyssey (1992–1994), writer, director, story editor
- Road to Avonlea (1992–1996), Writer
- Ready or Not (1993), writer
- North of 60 (1994–1996), writer
- Street Legal (1994), writer
- Trust in Me (1994), associate producer
- Traders (1996–2000), writer, supervising producer
- The Outer Limits (1997), writer
- Stargate SG-1 (1997–1999), writer
- Cupid (1998–1999), writer, consulting/supervising producer
- Snoops (1999), co-executive producer
- Judging Amy (2000–2003), writer, consulting producer, executive producer
- Joan of Arcadia (2003–2004), writer, consulting producer
- Bones (2005–2017), creator, writer, executive producer
- The Finder (2012), creator, writer, executive producer
- Backstrom (2014), creator, writer, executive producer

== Fiction ==
- The Driver (2017) ISBN 978-1101986363
- The Seminarian (2024) ISBN 979-8212234825

== Awards and nominations ==
Hanson has won four Gemini Awards. He was awarded Austin Film Festival's Outstanding Television Award in 2011.
