= Bones season 2 =

Bones
- Season 2
- Season 2 DVD cover art
- No. of episodes: 21

Release
- Original network: Fox
- Original release: August 30, 2006 – May 16, 2007

Season chronology
- ← Previous; Season 1 Next → Season 3

The second season of the American television series Bones premiered on August 30, 2006, and concluded on May 16, 2007, on Fox. The show maintained its previous time slot, airing on Wednesdays at 8:00 pm ET for the entire season. The season consisted of 21 episodes and averaged 9.4 million viewers. An additional episode, which was produced during the second season, aired during the second part of the third season.

The season saw a reworking of the original opening credits sequence to match each actor's name to footage of their character.

== Cast and characters ==
=== Main cast ===
Tamara Taylor joined the cast this season after the departure of Jonathan Adams. Taylor first appeared in the first six episodes of the season as a guest star and was promoted to a series regular and appeared in the opening credits beginning with episode 7.

- Emily Deschanel as Dr. Temperance "Bones" Brennan, a forensic anthropologist
- David Boreanaz as FBI Special Agent Seeley Booth, the official FBI liaison with the Jeffersonian
- Michaela Conlin as Angela Montenegro, a forensic artist
- Eric Millegan as Dr. Zack Addy, Dr. Brennan's lab assistant and now a professional forensic anthropologist
- T. J. Thyne as Dr. Jack Hodgins, an entomologist
- Tamara Taylor as Dr. Camille Saroyan, a forensic pathologist and the new head of the forensic division

=== Recurring cast ===
- Eddie McClintock as Tim "Sully" Sullivan
- Patricia Belcher as Caroline Julian, a prosecutor
- Stephen Fry as Dr. Gordon Wyatt, Booth's psychiatrist who evaluates his behavior
- Nathan Dean as FBI Special Agent Charlie Burns
- Ryan O'Neal as Max Keenan, Brennan's fugitive father
- Jessica Capshaw as Rebecca Stinson, Booth's ex-girlfriend and Parker's mother
- Heath Freeman as Howard Epps, a serial killer
- Ty Panitz as Parker Booth, Booth's son
- Chris Conner as Oliver Laurier
- Loren Dean as Russ Brennan, Brennan's brother
- Billy Gibbons as Angela's father
- David Greenman as Marcus Geier, a forensic technician
- Danny Woodburn as Alex Radziwill, a Diplomatic immunity and State Department official

== Episodes ==
The episode "Player Under Pressure" was originally supposed to air in April 2007 as the nineteenth episode of the season, but was delayed in the wake of the Virginia Tech massacre, as the episode's plot featured finding human remains on a college campus. The episode later aired in April 2008 as part of the third season, with new footage. The episode "Aliens in a Spaceship" introduces the storyline of the Grave Digger, an unresolved case. The Grave Digger would later return in the fourth season, when the team discovers its identity. Serial killer Howard Epps returns for two episodes, in which the team must discover more of his victims.

No. overall	No. in season	Title	Directed by	Written by	Original release date	Prod. code	US viewers (millions)
23	1	"The Titan on the Tracks"	Tony Wharmby	Hart Hanson	August 30, 2006	2AKY01	8.61
Brennan and Booth investigate the site of a train wreck where the bodies of a senator and a high-profile businessman are found within the wreckage. The businessman's body is found in a car on the train tracks, and at first look, it is an apparent suicide. While investigating a possible connection between the two victims, Brennan and her team discover the businessman is still alive, but severely injured, at a local hospital, and the body at the scene is someone else. As the clues begin to unravel, the investigation gets more complicated when details of the man's private life are revealed, leading Brennan and Booth to a private detective who may hold key information. Meanwhile, Brennan is introduced to Dr. Camille Saroyan, a first-rate pathologist who has been hired as the head of forensics at the Jeffersonian, and more importantly, Brennan's boss. It doesn't take long for Brennan to figure out "Cam" is a little too familiar with Booth and they share something of a past. Also, Booth encourages Brennan to visit her mother's grave site for the first time.
24	2	"The Mother and Child in the Bay"	Jesús Treviño	Stephen Nathan	September 6, 2006	2AKY02	9.13
Booth and Brennan investigate the remains of a woman and unborn baby washed up on the beach of the Delaware Bay. The body is identified as that of Carlie Richardson, a pregnant newly-wed whose mysterious disappearance one year ago had been a major national news story. However, the immediate prime suspect, Richardson's husband, has also disappeared. Meanwhile, Booth is annoyed his ex-girlfriend Rebecca, the mother of his son Parker, is letting Parker spend so much time with her new boyfriend.
25	3	"The Boy in the Shroud"	Sanford Bookstaver	Gary Glasberg	September 13, 2006	2AKY03	8.59
Brennan and her team dig through the trash to find clues when a young man wrapped in a shroud is found among garbage. After Angela is able to identify the deceased boy, Cam quickly assumes the main suspect to be the boy's girlfriend, Kelly, who is a product of the foster system. Brennan is hurt by this as she is also a product of the foster system. Meanwhile, things get tense when Brennan and Cam struggle for power in their disagreement on work styles. Cam threatens to fire Brennan, but backs down once Angela, then Booth, made her realize that action would cost her the whole Jeffersonian team as well as access to Booth who stated that he was with Bones "all the way".
26	4	"The Blonde in the Game"	Bryan Spicer	Noah Hawley	September 20, 2006	2AKY04	7.55
Skeletal remains of a young girl are found, and when brought back to the lab, the team recognizes this is not just any murder but Howard Epps, who the team encountered in the first season, a convicted serial killer on death row. He left clues leading to another body, a fresh kill only a week old. Brennan and her team scramble to decipher Epps' cryptic clues as they try in a desperate effort to find his accomplice who has been killing for Epps. When they realize another victim may be alive, the team works under pressure to try to find the young girl.
27	5	"The Truth in the Lye"	Steven DePaul	Scott Williams	September 27, 2006	2AKY05	7.80
Gruesome remains of a man dissolving in a bathtub of corrosive chemicals are found in a construction site. In a search of the man's identity, they realize he was living a double life with two different families. In what first appears to be a straightforward case of jealousy and insurance money, new clues send Brennan and Booth in a completely different direction and a third suspect is brought to light. Meanwhile, Brennan, curious, confronts Rebecca about her recent antics with Booth and her rejection of Booth's marriage proposal.
28	6	"The Girl in Suite 2103"	Karen Gaviola	Christopher Ambrose	October 4, 2006	2AKY06	8.10
Brennan and Booth are called to the site of an explosion in a Miami hotel where several people were either injured or killed, including an unidentified body found burned, thought to be the bomber. Initially, the explosion is thought to be the work of a Colombian drug cartel intending to target Judge Dolores Ramos, the Colombian judicial representative, who survived the blast. Diplomatic immunity and State Department official Alex Radziwill stand in way of Brennan and Booth's investigation as they pursue key clues about the case.
29	7	"The Girl with the Curl"	Thomas J. Wright	Karine Rosenthal	November 1, 2006	2AKY07	7.33
Brennan and Booth investigate the death of Brianna Swanson, a young beauty queen whose decomposed remains are discovered at a water filtration plant. Brianna's father is the initial suspect, but new clues lead elsewhere. Brennan and Booth investigate Brianna's dance school, where they find new information leading to several suspects. Meanwhile, Hodgins works up the nerve to ask Angela out on a date. At first, she rejects due to their situation as co-workers but after seeking advice from Brennan and Cam, she agrees to go.
30	8	"The Woman in the Sand"	Kate Woods	Elizabeth Benjamin	November 8, 2006	2AKY08	7.52
The team head to the outskirts of Las Vegas to investigate the murder of a missing federal prosecutor and a related murder of a female boxer. While questioning a suspect at a casino, Booth finds himself face to face with his old addiction: gambling. He and Bones go undercover as a couple to infiltrate an underground fight circuit to find out who or what got the victims killed.
31	9	"Aliens in a Spaceship"	Craig Ross Jr.	Janet Tamaro	November 15, 2006	2AKY09	7.83
The team investigate the murder of two kidnapped teenage twin boys. The boys were placed in a spaceship-like capsule and buried alive underground. Soon, Brennan and Hodgins find themselves victims of the "Grave Digger", and Booth frantically searches for them as they slowly run out of oxygen underground. The case as broadcast has no conclusion (it was solved in the season 4 episode "The Hero in the Hold"). The Fox Network website initially displayed a summary for the episode which included an original ending where the Grave Digger was identified as the female reporter who coauthored a book about the Grave Digger. The summary was later revised to reflect the episode as broadcast in which the Grave Digger is unidentified and the scene replaced by character reunion moments.
32	10	"The Headless Witch in the Woods"	Tony Wharmby	Stephen Nathan & Karine Rosenthal	November 29, 2006	2AKY10	8.66
Brennan and Booth investigate when a headless corpse is found in the woods along with a frightening video tape of events on the night of the murder. Meanwhile, Hodgins and Angela are assigned to find any possible information on the video, much to Hodgins' glee, as Angela grasps his arm out of fear of what she sees. The episode's plot is a slight parody of the famous found-footage horror film, The Blair Witch Project, with even the famous antagonist (the Blair Witch) of the film, presented as a legend in this episode (referred to here as "Maggie Cinders"). The murder suspects claim that "Maggie" killed the victim, and Brennan even finds a second, unidentified head that seems to corroborate that claim. At the end of the episode, after the killer is caught, Hodgins and Angela are relieved to turn off the video, but then they notice the silhouette of a headless female figure with an axe heading toward the victim right before he was killed. Freaked out, they both offer probably correct and rational theories explaining it, with Angela fearfully asking Hodgins at the end, "Can I stay at your place tonight?", much to Hodgins' obvious pleasure.
33	11	"Judas on a Pole"	David Duchovny	Hart Hanson	December 13, 2006	2AKY11	8.62
Zack defends his dissertation to obtain his doctorate and asks help from a colleague. Meanwhile, Booth and Brennan are called to the scene where a man's body was found gutted, burned and hung like a scarecrow on the roof of a hotel that housed Federal witnesses. Booth determines the victim was a snitch working in an organized crime syndicate. Brennan's brother, Russ, informs her of a phone call he received from their father, warning him they are both in danger. Soon after, a priest contacts Brennan telling her that her father insists she and Booth drop their case. They determine the body found was actually an ex-FBI agent, tracking Russ to kill him — hence explaining the warning from Brennan's father. With the help of Angela, Booth and the team uncover a decades-old cover-up that could potentially ruin his career if he decides to continue with the investigation.
34	12	"The Man in the Cell"	Jesús Treviño	Noah Hawley	January 31, 2007	2AKY12	12.40
Booth and Brennan are ordered to the cell of serial killer Howard Epps to identify the remains of an inmate. To their surprise, the charred remains don't belong to Epps. It's soon learned Epps has escaped and is on a revenge path, which involves Booth's young son, Parker. Due to the danger of the case, Brennan must get FBI protection. Cam inhales a toxin while performing an autopsy, which puts her life in danger.
35	13	"The Girl in the Gator"	Allan Kroeker	Scott Williams	February 7, 2007	2AKY13	12.57
When Booth is ordered to go see a psychiatrist (guest star Stephen Fry) after irrationally discharging his firearm (at the clown on the top of an ice cream truck), Brennan is paired up with Agent Tim Sullivan to investigate the apparent murder of a college student in the Everglades, and by the time the case is solved Sullivan and Brennan express their mutual interest in each other.
36	14	"The Man in the Mansion"	Dwight Little	Christopher Ambrose	February 14, 2007	2AKY14	12.28
When a benefactor of the Jeffersonian is found murdered, it's up to the team to find out who, but Hodgins' past with the widow complicates matters. Meanwhile Booth continues to see the therapist (guest star Stephen Fry), and Brennan is progressing in her exploratory relationship with Sullivan.
37	15	"The Bodies in the Book"	Craig Ross Jr.	Karine Rosenthal	March 14, 2007	2AKY15	10.36
Three separate bodies are found murdered exactly the way Brennan wrote them in her new book. However, the killer's method was different every time, leading the team to believe that it was not one but three killers. Booth and Sully become concerned for Brennan, while she insists she can take care of herself. This increases tension between Sully and Brennan, straining their relationship. Booth tries to help them along, apparently fine with the couple. At the end of the episode, Sully and Brennan reconcile and kiss and Booth, walking away, looks back sadly.
38	16	"The Boneless Bride in the River"	Tony Wharmby	Gary Glasberg	March 21, 2007	2AKY16	10.47
During Brennan's vacation, a woman's body is found with its bones removed. The team interviews people who knew the woman, but they all seemed to be hiding something. Meanwhile Sully tells Brennan he bought a boat and will be leaving for a year, at the end of the case, to tour the Caribbean; he asks Brennan to take a year-long sabbatical and go with him. At the end of the episode Sully sails off in his new boat, "Temperance", while Brennan waves good-bye, as she has decided not to go.
39	17	"The Priest in the Churchyard"	Scott Lautanen	Lyla Oliver	March 28, 2007	2AKY17	10.58
Brennan and Zack examine corpses, which have been spilled out of their coffins, due to a burst water main in an old cemetery on the St. Agatha church grounds. However, as they identify the individual bodies to be put back in their proper place, they find one skeleton that is out of place. Father Donlan, who runs the church, says all these bodies had been buried for at least 50 years and yet Brennan believes one of them was buried five years ago with no coffin. When it is confirmed the deceased was murdered, Booth and Brennan investigate the priests and administrator of the church and argue about the validity of religion.
40	18	"The Killer in the Concrete"	Jeff Woolnough	Dean Widenmann	April 4, 2007	2AKY18	10.53
The remains of a body are discovered encased in concrete, and Booth has a hunch the victim is connected to an organized-crime boss. When Booth suspects a dead, former hit man (Hugh Kennedy) is apparently alive, he contacts the bounty hunter who found what was left of his remains (a severed leg). When Booth travels to Baltimore to find the hit man, he gets knocked unconscious and tied up by Kennedy himself, but Kennedy soon flees, leaving Booth relatively unhurt whilst still restrained. Meanwhile, Brennan's estranged father pays her a visit. Brennan later appeals to her father to find Booth, having not heard from him. When they get to Baltimore, they find Kennedy's hotel room and the bounty hunter inside. Brennan gets violent with her when she finds Booth's tooth in the hallway, suspecting the bounty hunter's involvement in her partner's abduction. Meanwhile, Booth is being tortured by Kennedy's former rival crime boss, Gallagher and his partner. When Booth is finally located in an aircraft hangar, Brennan and Max come to his rescue. When Gallagher tries to escape, he's arrested by the FBI waiting outside while his partner injures himself when Booth tips over his chair. Booth tries to arrest Max even in his state, given Max's status as a fugitive. Brennan helps her father slip away.
41	19	"Spaceman in a Crater"	Jeannot Szwarc	Elizabeth Benjamin	May 2, 2007	2AKY20	10.56
The team investigates the death of an astronaut who appears to have fallen to Earth from a high altitude. While Brennan and Booth question his associates at the Space Agency, Hodgins theorizes about a conspiracy involving extraterrestrials. Hodgins asks Angela to marry him but she refuses, asking him to keep trying.
42	20	"The Glowing Bones in the Old Stone House"	Caleb Deschanel	Stephen Nathan	May 9, 2007	2AKY21	10.23
Brennan and Booth are called by Homeland Security to investigate the scene at an old stone house where some glowing bones have been found. Fearing the remains might be radioactive, the pair don protective hazmat suits and cautiously enter the house, where they find the glowing bones but no radioactivity. Back at the Jeffersonian, the team examines the bones and determines the identity of the victim, but there is no immediate explanation as to why the remains are emitting a green glow. With each of their specialties called upon, the whole Jeffersonian team joins Brennan and Booth in pursuing the murder mystery, which leads them to a group of friends who are shocked to discover one of their own is the victim. During the course of the investigation, the victim and their friends' MySpace pages, along with the photos, videos and blogs they contain, are a virtual tool for the Jeffersonian team's search for answers. Meanwhile, Hodgins professes his love for Angela in a very unusual way. In the end, Angela decides to propose to Hodgins and they agree to get married.
43	21	"Stargazer in a Puddle"	Tony Wharmby	Hart Hanson	May 16, 2007	2AKY22	10.88
The team works on finding how Chelsea Cole, a fan of astronomy who suffered from Werner syndrome, died. Meanwhile, Hodgins and Angela prepare for their wedding. Zack is asked to serve his country in Iraq. Brennan's father, Max, tries to let her in on her past and brings her a 1993 video of her mother. Booth and Max get into a fist fight before Max surrenders to his arrest. The investigation leads to the victim's mother as the killer who admits guilt, confessing that she killed her disabled daughter thinking she was dying herself, fearing what would happen to Chelsea if she died. Brennan has a confronting revelation about the mother, acknowledging that she did what she did out of love. This holds significance for Brennan due to her parents abandoning her as a child, realizing they did it out of love. After resolving the case, Angela and Hodgins prepare for the wedding and Booth shares some touching information with Brennan. After a surprising turn of events, Caroline Julian informs the couple that Angela is still married to a man from a previous relationship, which she assumed hadn't been serious. The couple escape embarrassment, leaving Brennan and Booth facing each other awkwardly at the altar.

== DVD release ==
The second season of Bones was released on DVD in region 1 on September 11, 2007, in region 2 on October 15, 2007 and in region 4 on December 3, 2008. The set includes all 21 episodes of season two on a 6-disc set presented in anamorphic widescreen. Special features include two audio commentaries—"The Glowing Bones in the Old Stone House" by writer Stephen Nathan, actress Emily Deschanel and director Caleb Deschanel and "Stargazer in a Puddle" by executive producers Stephen Nathan, Barry Josephson and Hart Hanson. Featurettes include "The Memories in the Season" and "Visceral Effects: The Digital Illusions of Bones". Also included are deleted scenes and a gag reel.
