= Bones season 3 =

Bones
- Season 3
- Season 3 DVD cover art
- No. of episodes: 15

Release
- Original network: Fox
- Original release: September 25, 2007 – May 19, 2008

Season chronology
- ← Previous; Season 2 Next → Season 4

The third season of the American television series Bones premiered on September 25, 2007, and concluded on May 19, 2008, on Fox. The show moved back to its original time slot, airing on Tuesdays at 8:00 p.m. ET before moving to Mondays at 8:00 p.m. ET in 2008. Although a full slate of 20 episodes were produced, the 2007–2008 Writers Guild of America strike interfered with the writing of Season 3, and the network rearranged the broadcast schedule to compensate. One episode from the second production season, "Player Under Pressure", was moved to the third broadcast season, and six episodes from the third production season were moved to the fourth broadcast season. Due to this rearrangement, the show had an extended hiatus after "The Santa in the Slush" aired on November 27, 2007; the show returned on April 14, 2008. The season averaged 8.9 million viewers.

== Cast and characters ==
=== Main cast ===
John Francis Daley joined the cast this season, originally appearing as a guest star in three episodes, and then being promoted to a series regular and appeared in the opening credits beginning with episode 9.

- Emily Deschanel as Dr. Temperance "Bones" Brennan, a forensic anthropologist
- David Boreanaz as FBI Special Agent Seeley Booth, the official FBI liaison with the Jeffersonian
- Michaela Conlin as Angela Montenegro, a forensic artist
- Eric Millegan as Dr. Zack Addy, Dr. Brennan's lab assistant and forensic anthropologist
- Tamara Taylor as Dr. Camille Saroyan, a forensic pathologist and the head of the forensic division
- T. J. Thyne as Dr. Jack Hodgins, an entomologist
- John Francis Daley as Dr. Lance Sweets, an FBI psychologist who studies the relationship between Dr. Brennan and Agent Booth

=== Recurring cast ===
- Patricia Belcher as Caroline Julian, a prosecutor
- Nathan Dean as FBI Special Agent Charlie Burns
- David Greenman as Marcus Geier, a forensic technician
- Ryan O'Neal as Max Keenan, Brennan's father
- Loren Dean as Russ Brennan, Brennan's brother
- Eugene Byrd as Dr. Clark Edison
- Ty Panitz as Parker Booth, Booth's son

== Episodes ==
This season featured the season-long story arc revolving around the cannibalistic serial killer known as Gormogon. In the season finale, the team discovers the Gormogon's identity and in the process, uncover the horrifying secret that one of their own has been working with Gormogon. The episode "Player Under Pressure" was originally supposed to air during the second season in April 2007 but was delayed in the wake of the Virginia Tech massacre. The original version included references to Hodgins planning to ask Angela to move in with him when they were already engaged at this point, so they shot new scenes for Hodgins and Angela.

No. overall	No. in season	Title	Directed by	Written by	Original release date	Prod. code	US viewers (millions)
44	1	"The Widow's Son in the Windshield"	Ian Toynton	Hart Hanson	September 25, 2007	3AKY01	8.40
The team investigates a case concerning a skull smashing through the windshield of a group of teenagers' car. The skull belongs to a violinist who disappeared after a concert and may have been a victim of cannibalism, leading them to an old bank vault filled with occult items. While Zack is away, Brennan searches for a new assistant. Angela and Hodgins hire a private investigator to track down Angela's ex-husband, who is identified with the nickname "Berimbau" (incorrectly defined as the name of a Brazilian flute). The case does not conclude at the end of the episode, but begins the recurring Gormogon story arc.
45	2	"Soccer Mom in the Mini-Van"	Allan Kroeker	Elizabeth Benjamin	October 2, 2007	3AKY03	7.98
A minivan explodes at a car park, killing a woman. After piecing together her remains, Booth and the team realize that she is a known fugitive to the FBI for nearly thirty years. It turns out that the woman had been a member of the National Liberation Army, a leftist radical group who were presumed responsible for several crimes, in the 1970s. The case is reopened as Booth finds himself in an awkward position when his former mentor, who was the agent in charge of the case, and prosecuting attorney Caroline Julian clash. Meanwhile, Brennan visits her father, who is in prison after being arrested by Booth.
46	3	"Death in the Saddle"	Craig Ross Jr.	Josh Berman	October 9, 2007	3AKY02	8.48
After the decomposed body of a man, whose feet were removed and arms bound, is found in the woods, the team is called in to investigate. The man is discovered to have stayed at a pony play retreat and was killed with a hoof knife. His wife discovered him at the retreat with another woman just before he died, and both become suspects in the case as well as the lover's ex-husband. Meanwhile, Angela attempts to go under hypnosis to find out the name of her husband nicknamed Berimbau to divorce him in order to marry Hodgins. Though the hypnosis fails initially it ultimately leads her to the name, Grayson Barasa.
47	4	"The Secret in the Soil"	Steven DePaul	Karine Rosenthal	October 23, 2007	3AKY04	8.94
Booth and Brennan are called to investigate a decomposed body found on the grounds of an organic composting site. The body, belonging to the founder of an organic supermarket chain, was indicated by its unusually high temperature to have been incinerated. The team discovers a double homicide when flesh from another body is found, which turns out to have belonged to the first victim's daughter. Meanwhile, the FBI forces Booth and Brennan to undergo psychological counseling with Dr. Lance Sweets.
48	5	"Mummy in the Maze"	Marita Grabiak	Scott Williams	October 30, 2007	3AKY05	8.85
The FBI is called to investigate after the mummified remains of a teenage girl are found in a Halloween-themed maze. Brennan and her team determine the girl has been dead for about a year. Another mummified remains of a teenage girl are found at a Halloween amusement park funhouse, who they determine was killed approximately two years ago. When the team finds out a third teenage girl is missing, they realize they have until the Halloween holiday to save her.
49	6	"Intern in the Incinerator"	Jeff Woolnough	Christopher Ambrose	November 6, 2007	3AKY06	9.52
Employees of the Jeffersonian Institute become murder suspects when the remains of a Jeffersonian intern is found in the building's incinerator. Booth, Brennan and their team set about to investigate her death and find she had been working on authenticating items from the bank vault of the Gormogon case, which is still open. They acquire further motives for her death when they discover she had been in a romantic relationship with a married Jeffersonian employee. Meanwhile, Booth poses as Cam's boyfriend and accompanies her to her family get-together.
50	7	"Boy in the Time Capsule"	Chad Lowe	Janet Lin	November 13, 2007	3AKY07	9.12
The body of a teenage boy is found by his former high school classmates to have been hidden inside a time capsule that was buried 20 years ago. As the team investigates the class of 1987 to find the boy's killer, they find a disk among his belongings, containing a game which would have been a landmark title in 1987 if released. They also discover he was the father of a classmate's son. The team relive their high school memories as they sift through the evidence. Brennan and Booth receive some psychological profiling advice of the killer from their therapist, Dr. Sweets.
51	8	"The Knight on the Grid"	Dwight Little	Noah Hawley	November 20, 2007	3AKY08	8.70
Booth and Brennan's investigation into the death of a priest leads them back on the case of the Gormogon serial killer when the priest's kneecaps were discovered to have been surgically removed. They realize the killer has a pattern for choosing victims after Angela finds a victim tree in the evidence vault. The team attempts to make predictions on who the next victim is while Dr. Sweets provides psychological insights into the killer for Brennan and Booth. Meanwhile, Brennan's brother reappears.
52	9	"The Santa in the Slush"	Jeff Woolnough	Elizabeth Benjamin & Scott Williams	November 27, 2007	3AKY10	9.62
Three days before Christmas, Booth, Brennan and their team are sent to investigate the death of a Santa Claus impostor after his body was discovered in the sewer near a mall. The team discovers the man's legal name was Kristopher Kringle and was highly regarded in his profession while he worked for a local "Rent-A-Santa" business. Meanwhile, Brennan and Booth find themselves under a mistletoe, and Brennan decides to spend Christmas with her father, brother and his family.
53	10	"The Man in the Mud"	Scott Lautanen	Janet Tamaro	April 14, 2008	3AKY11	8.54
A body is discovered at Homestead Natural Hot Springs in a spring filled with mud. Booth and Brennan go to investigate the scene and find that the body is Tripp Goddard, a motorcycle racer who had been murdered after a race about two weeks prior. Sweets' girlfriend is also introduced.
54	11	"Player Under Pressure"	Jessica Landaw	Janet Tamaro	April 21, 2008	2AKY19	8.64
All team members are working to identify the bones from a college athlete who suffered a lot of fractures. After the body is identified they talk to his sister and somebody who acted as a sort of an adviser for the deceased.
55	12	"The Baby in the Bough"	Ian Toynton	Karine Rosenthal	April 28, 2008	3AKY09	9.68
A woman's car is run off the road and she is killed, but her baby miraculously survives the accident. Booth and Brennan go to the woman's hometown to try to find out who's responsible for running her car off the road. Bones, with help from Booth, takes care of the baby until the team finds out who killed the mother.
56	13	"The Verdict in the Story"	Jeannot Szwarc	Christopher Ambrose	May 5, 2008	3AKY13	8.13
Brennan's father Max Keenan is on trial for the alleged murder of FBI Deputy Director Kirby. Everyone on the team, except for Brennan, is called as a witness for the prosecution during the trial. Brennan on the other hand is the forensics advisor for the defense, and she must rely on both her dedication to her family and her skill as an anthropologist to help free her father.
57	14	"The Wannabe in the Weeds"	Gordon C. Lonsdale	Josh Berman	May 12, 2008	3AKY12	9.42
When aspiring singer Tommy Sour (Ace Young) is found dead, an investigation leads to the Checker Box Restaurant's Open Mic Night. Brennan reveals she is more musically inclined than she appears, and Booth is shot, his fate unknown.
58	15	"The Pain in the Heart"	Allan Kroeker	Hart Hanson & Stephen Nathan	May 19, 2008	3AKY14	10.15
After Booth's "funeral" (which was in fact a covert operation, Booth being very much alive), a human jawbone shows up at the Jeffersonian, Brennan and the team quickly realize the Gormogon serial killer has struck again. In a shocking turn of events, an explosion in the lab injures Zack and Hodgins, Cam discovers that Gormogon's silver skeleton is missing from the basement vault. The team realize that it is an "inside job" and every Jeffersonian employee as well as Booth and Sweets become suspects.

== DVD release ==
The third season of Bones was released on DVD (subtitled "Totally Decomposed Edition") in region 1 on November 18, 2008, in region 2 on November 17, 2008 and in region 4 on March 4, 2009. The set includes all 15 episodes of season three on a 5-disc set presented in anamorphic widescreen. The first four episodes of broadcast season four, which were part of production season 3, are included as bonus episodes on the region 1 and 2 releases. Special features include "Director's take", a series of episodic featurettes—"The Vault", "Making of the Body", "Car Crash-Exploding Van", "Squints", and "The Angelator". Three episodes ("The Knight on the Grid", "The Santa in the Slush" and "The Baby in the Bough") include their extended versions, while "Player Under Pressure" (an episode originally produced during season two) includes both the aired and original unaired version. Also included is a gag reel.
