= The Titan on the Tracks =

- Bones episode
- Episode no.: Season 2 Episode 1
- Directed by: Tony Wharmby
- Written by: Hart Hanson
- Production code: 2AKY01
- Original air date: August 30, 2006

Guest appearances
- Tamara Taylor as Camille Saroyan; Allison Dunbar as Brianna Lynch; Ray Wise as Rick Turco; Christine Estabrook as Lisa Supek; Ann Cusack as Brianna's Lawyer; Timothy Landfield as Daniel Burrows; Sam Witwer as Mitchell Downs; Alex Hyde-White as Mr. Hobbes; JoNell Kennedy as Dr. Lawrence; Jeremy Luke as Eddie Bean; Marlon John as Fireman

Episode chronology
← Previous "The Woman in Limbo"	Next → "Mother and Child in the Bay"

"The Titan on the Tracks" is the second season premiere of the American television series Bones and the 23rd episode overall. Written by series creator Hart Hanson and directed by Tony Wharmby, the episode first aired on the Fox network on August 30, 2006. The episode's plot features the investigation of FBI Special Agent Seeley Booth (played by David Boreanaz) and Dr. Temperance Brennan (played by Emily Deschanel) into the deaths of a U.S. senator and an ex-basketball player. The episode also introduces a new main character, Dr. Camille Saroyan (played by Tamara Taylor), who is Brennan's new superior.

== Summary ==
As Special Agent Booth drives Dr. Brennan to the crime scene, they discuss Brennan's vacation and her decision to keep looking for her father, despite his warning (in "The Woman in Limbo"). They arrive at the crime scene, where a train has derailed after crashing into a parked car on the tracks. A prominent senator was killed and an ex-basketball player appears to have been at the wheel of the car. Booth introduces Brennan to her new boss, Dr. Camille Saroyan, who has been hired by Dr. Goodman to be the Head of Forensic Division at the Jeffersonian Institute.

Brennan's colleagues, Dr. Jack Hodgins and Angela Montenegro, think that she deserves the position as the Head of Forensic Division. Angela notes that Booth and Cam act like they were previously involved. Preliminary examination of the evidence identifies the driver as Warren Lynch, a CEO and ex-basketball player. Soon, it is revealed that Lynch was a heroin addict, and that he had died several hours before his car was placed in front of the train. However, after Zack's cranial reconstruction, Angela does a facial reconstruction that proves the driver not to be Warren Lynch.

Booth and Brennan find Lynch comatose in a hospital. As they investigate further, it becomes clear that he and his shady private investigator, Rick Turco, were involved in the plot from the start, to win hundreds of millions of dollars from betting that the shares of his company would plummet.

Meanwhile, the man who murdered Brennan's mother is killed in prison by a maniac who murdered his entire family. When Brennan finds out her father ordered the hit on his wife's murderer, Brennan begins to question whether he is a good man, and whether she should continue looking for him. When Brennan finally gives in to Booth's idea of talking to her mother and laying flowers at her grave, she finds that her father had visited the grave, and still cares deeply for his wife.

== Music ==
The episode featured the following music:

- The Greatest - Cat Power
- Be Here Now - Ray LaMontagne

== Conception ==
The original idea for the premiere episode of Season 2 was of "an assassin targeting FBI agents". When the writers presented the idea to the studio, the executives suggested that they could create a more dramatic scenario and the idea of a train wreck was born. Hart Hanson, the writer of the episode, expanded the plot to include his ideas of "high-powered CEO’s manipulating the stock market to earn millions", which were brought about from his experience in working on the Canadian television show, Traders.

== Response ==
On its original airdate in the Wednesday 8:00 pm ET timeslot, the premiere of the second season of Bones attracted 8.61 million viewers with 6.7% household rating and 11% household share. Bones was ranked first in total viewers and second among the 18- to 49-year-olds demographic in its timeslot.
