= October Faction (TV series) =

2020 American supernatural drama television series

- Genre: Supernatural; Drama; Horror
- Created by: Damian Kindler
- Based on: The October Faction by: Steve Niles and Damien Worm
- Starring: Tamara Taylor; J. C. MacKenzie; Aurora Dawson-Hunte (as Aurora Burghart); Gabriel Darku; Maxim Roy; Stephen McHattie; Wendy Crewson; Megan Follows
- Composer: Tim Welch
- Country of origin: United States
- Original language: English
- No. of seasons: 1
- No. of episodes: 10

Production
- Executive producers: Damian Kindler; James Thorpe; Eric Birnberg; Thomas Walden; Lydia Antonini; Matthew McCluggage; Steve Niles; Ted Adams; John Calvert
- Producers: Mohamad El Masri; John Calvert
- Production locations: Toronto, Ontario; Cambridge, Ontario
- Cinematography: Miroslaw Baszak
- Editors: Ben Wilkinson; Lisa Grootenboer; Michael Doherty; Hugh Elchuk; Don Cassidy
- Camera setup: Single-camera
- Running time: 36–49 minutes
- Production companies: High Park Entertainment; IDW Entertainment; Plastic Hallway Productions West

Original release
- Network: Netflix
- Release: January 23, 2020

October Faction is an American supernatural drama television series created by Damian Kindler, based on the comic series of the same name by Steve Niles and Damien Worm. It premiered on Netflix on January 23, 2020. The series stars Tamara Taylor, J. C. MacKenzie, Aurora Dawson-Hunte, Gabriel Darku, Wendy Crewson, Megan Follows and Stephen McHattie. In March 2020, the series was canceled after one season.

== Synopsis ==
October Faction follows the story of a monster-hunting couple, Fred and Deloris Allen, and their twin teenage children, Geoff and Viv. Following the death of Fred's father Samuel, the family decides to go back to their home town Barrington-on-Hudson, in New York, to arrange the funeral. Haunted with childhood memories of his brother's death and the incessant arguments with his parents over his inadequacy and his choice in women, Fred is repulsed by his childhood home. The children soon begin showing supernatural tendencies. During an impromptu séance Viv has visions of a creature with long hair chained to the seafloor, struggling to free itself. Her brother Geoff accidentally reveals a teacher's deepest, darkest secret about his wife in front of his classmates. Both are ridiculed by the popular cliques for being outsiders.

Fred and Deloris are members of Presidio, a secret organization tasked to protect humanity from various breeds of monsters. They must hide their identities from the townsfolk and appear to live a normal life. This proves hard from the start as strange things begin to unfold in the sleepy little town.

== Cast ==
=== Main ===
- Tamara Taylor as Deloris Allen, a supernatural hunter who is part of a secret organization known as "Presidio"
- J. C. MacKenzie as Fred Allen, Deloris' husband and a fellow Presidio supernatural hunter who came from a family of Presidio supernatural hunters
- Aurora Dawson-Hunte as Viv Allen, Deloris and Fred's teenage daughter
- Gabriel Darku as Geoff Allen, Deloris and Fred's openly gay teenage son and Viv's twin
- Maxim Roy as Alice Harlow, a murderous warlock hunting the Allens after she caused the deaths of her own family and friends, Viv and Geoff's natural mother
- Stephen McHattie as Samuel Allen, Fred's father who is thought dead, but is a prisoner of Presidio
- Wendy Crewson as Maggie Allen, Fred's mother and a retired Presidio archivist
- Megan Follows as Edith Mooreland, the head of Presidio

=== Recurring ===
- Anwen O'Driscoll as Cathy MacDonald, Viv's potential friend who betrays her trust first chance she gets
- Nicola Correia-Damude as Gina Fernandez, the local sheriff of Barrington-on-Hudson and Deloris' friend
- Sara Waisglass as Madison St. Claire, a bully to Viv and Cathy's former friend
- Praneet Akilla as Phillip Mishra, a closeted jock and initially a bully to Geoff
- Michelle Nolden as Hannah Mercer, a Presidio agent and Fred's mistress
- Dayo Ade as Moshe, a werewolf who forms a grudging friendship with Fred and Deloris, and later with the Barrington sheriff department
- Robin Dunne as Woody Markham, a deputy sheriff of Barrington-on-Hudson
- Charles Vandervaart as young Fred
- Taveeta Szymanowicz as young Deloris
- Robert Bazzocchi as Steve Thompson, a student who died in a car wreck, but whose ghost can be seen by Geoff.

== Episodes ==
No.	Title	Directed by	Written by	Original release date
1	"Presidio"	Director X	Damian Kindler	January 23, 2020
Fred Allen and his wife Dolores work for Presidio, an organization that hunts and kills various supernatural creatures. During a Presidio assignment, Fred is notified that his father, Samuel, has died. He takes his family back to Barrington-on-Hudson, his hometown in upstate New York, for the funeral. At his boyhood home, he and Dolores clean the house of Presidio weapons and files, as his parents and his brother, Seth, were also Presidio agents. At the wake, other teens from the town are rude to Fred and Dolores' seventeen-year-old twin children, Viv and Geoff. To impress them, Geoff suggests a seance to contact their grandfather to find where money that is rumored to be in the house is hidden. During the séance, Viv makes a psychic connection with Alice Harlow, a woman who is chained to concrete blocks underwater. The connection revives the woman and releases the chains. After the woman surfaces, it is apparent she is not a normal human, but a powerful warlock. Meanwhile, Dolores and Fred go to the store during the wake to restock on drinks and hors durves. While there, they spot a vampire couple stalking a store worker. They find the worker dead in the back and dispatch them, trying to clean up the evidence as best they can while stoned from a joint they found in Fred's old car.
2	"No Country for Old Vamps"	Director X	Mohamad El Masri	January 23, 2020
The Allens have settled into Fred's old home, and the twins are attending the local high school. Alice attacks Presidio agents in Boston and accesses the Presidio computer to learn the location of the Allen family. Fred begins to clean out Seth's old room and discovers a large ritual symbol on the floor. Geoff is bullied by a teacher and suddenly reveals embarrassing personal information in class that humiliates the teacher. The twins go on a school field trip. Alice disables the school bus and blocks it with a truck. She freezes time to get close to the twins unnoticed. She realizes Viv was the one who released her, and therefore leaves. Later, Viv finds one of the sketches she did before the field trip showed the scene of the truck blocking the bus. Fred's father is revealed to not be dead but is being held prisoner by Presidio. He is interrogated about the symbol Fred found, but won't cooperate.
3	"The Horror Out of Time"	Damian Kindler	George Strayton	January 23, 2020
Presidio electronic communications are on lockdown since the computer breach in Boston. Fred has to meet with a Presidio agent, Hannah Mercer. He gives her a copy of the symbol he found in Seth's room, and they sleep together as they have been having an ongoing affair. Dolores goes out for a drink and is attacked by a gang of Vampires seeking revenge for the couple that Dolores and Fred killed at the supermarket. She is able to fight them off and escape. Viv confides in Geoff and her new friend Cathy about her premonition about the truck and the bus. Geoff strikes up a conversation with Steve Thompson, a student he sees in the school hall, and finds out later that he had been killed in a car wreck. The agent returns to Presidio with the photograph of the symbol and indicates Samuel Allen has succeeded in some clandestine experiment that may be a threat to a Presidio project called "The Initiative". The leader of Presidio indicates Fred and Dolores may be a threat also. Fred and Dolores track down the gang that attacked Dolores only to find they have already been killed.
4	"Soirees of Future Past"	Damian Kindler	Keely MacDonald	January 23, 2020
In 1995, Fred and Dolores are fighting monsters in Bangalore and Dolores is wounded in the abdomen. When she receives medical treatment, the doctor informs them that Dolores will not be able to have children. In the present, Dolores and Fred go to Presidio headquarters in New York City, and Geoff decides to throw a party at their house while they are gone. Alice arrives at the party and slips through time to get past all the students unnoticed. Steve reappears to Geoff, and Geoff has visions of the night Steve died. Viv meets a boy, and he talks her into going outside, where he forces himself on her. She begins to fight back, but the boy is thrown off her by a hooded stranger with a scanner attached to his eye. He scans Viv and leaves. Alice makes her way to Samuel's study and finds a secret room full of artifacts. Fred and Dolores return home unexpectedly and see the extensive aftermath of the party. They begin to chastise Viv and Geoff. Alice is startled when she hears the Allens' voices and hurriedly grabs a small urn off a shelf, setting off a security alarm. Fred and Dolores grab weapons to pursue the intruder. Geoff and Viv walk in and see the weapons and the room full of artifacts. Alice escapes into the woods, and Fred and Dolores try to figure out a way to explain everything to the twins.
5	"Truth and Consequences"	Megan Follows	Melissa Blake	January 23, 2020
The dust settles after the party, and Geoff and Viv are angry with their parent's long deception, but return to school. Discussions ensue, but are interrupted by breaches to Fred's security systems. He leaves to track intruders. Dolores is elsewhere in the woods and is confronted by Gina, who has figured out Fred and Dolores may be involved in a recent murder (of a monster, which was covered up) at a supermarket. But their standoff is interrupted by Alice the warlock, who has gained in strength by bathing in human blood and the ashes from the urn. Alice makes Gina turn her gun on herself, and she is shot in the abdomen and ends up in the hospital. A surprise band of monsters, in military fatigues and armed, arrive and almost kill Alice, who escapes. Alice then hunts down and kills most of this armed band. The search for Alice escalates, and the kids are recalled home.
6	"Open Your Eyes"	Megan Follows	Christina Walker	January 23, 2020
Viv shields the strange hooded stranger with a scanner attached to his eye at the family house, believing him to be no threat. The episode deals with increasing distrust of Presidio by the Allens. In Presidio hq, Hannah Mercer starts gossip about the Allens, while her boss still secretly detains Samuel Allen. In the woods, Alice continues to murder the armed group of monsters and then heads to the Allens' house. Fred's insider contact in Presidio helps him covertly identify marauding vampires and helps Fred connect Alice to a band of warlocks known as 'Harlow House' (but he is found out assisting Fred, and Hannah shoots him dead). Alice enters the house, knifes Fred's mother, who is still breathing by the end of the episode, but another group of Presidio armed forces is now chasing her, and she kills most of them also. Chaos ensues.
7	"Nadir"	Mina Shum	James Thorpe	January 23, 2020
The episode deals with the humanization of monsters and their stories, and Fred and Dolore's realization that Presidio is inhumane and has a secret, but still unknown, agenda. Running to save his family, Fred gets in a standoff with the last remaining armed monster, a vampire named Moshe. A spirited discussion ensues, in which Moshe reveals how his family spent years evading capture and death, before Fred's deceased brother, Seth, killed his wife and child in cold blood. Seth is revealed to have been a sadistic hunter. Fred wavers in killing the vampire, and an uneasy truce is made so they can locate Alice. Dolores cauterizes Fred's mother's wound to stop her from bleeding to death. Alice now has Geoff and Viv captured in another house, and tells them that they are, in fact, warlocks. They are unsure, escape, but are recaptured by Presidio forces, who then neutralize them with warlock powers. Meanwhile, Fred, Dolores, and Moshe infiltrate a secret Presidio facility still in upstate New York to rescue one of Moshe's group (Niklaus) capable of detecting warlocks, and discover experimentation on monsters taking place. Niklaus is rescued but dies. The Presidio boss shows Fred's mother that Samuel is still alive.
8	"Alice"	Mina Shum	Keely MacDonald & Mohamad El Masri	January 23, 2020
A backstory about Alice, who, as a warlock living in a secluded community (Harlow House), tries to engage with humanity and makes a human friend. Her warlock community is highly skeptical. The friend turns out to be an undercover agent directed by Samuel and turns her over to Presidio, having gotten Alice to reveal the location of Harlow. Presidio attacks Harlow and kills many, using sonic tech to neutralize warlock powers. Omari, Alive's partner, is killed by Seth, and Samuel takes the ashes of warlock leaders, where their powers reside, to use them for his own scheme. A bombshell is that it turns out Alice's twins, born on that day, are actually Geoff and Viv, already exhibiting warlock powers, and they were taken from Alice and adopted by Fred and Dolores as babies.
9	"Bonds of Blood"	David Frazee	Melissa Blake & George Strayton	January 23, 2020
A year-old flashback, dealing with Samuel 'creating' Dante in a ritual using the ashes, for unknown reasons... (he turns out to be a reincarnation of Seth, his son, who he desperately wanted back). Samuel is imprisoned earlier in the series because of it, but is not talking. Fred and Dolores are having a rethink about their Presidio actions and long careers, now that their adopted kids have been revealed as warlocks, and hate them for what they did. Fred realizes Dante is Seth reincarnated.
10	"The October Faction"	David Frazee	Damian Kindler & James Thorpe	January 23, 2020
Many of the teens from school, alongside other townsfolk, convene at a town carnival; Alice summons her powers there and, using the ashes of her elders, places the deceased warlocks in the townsfolk's bodies, using a spell to recreate her lost community. Presidio locates her through a spike in supernatural activity. The Barrington police force and their feisty chief suspect the just-arrived 'FBI' (actual Presidio) are more than they seem. Presidio attacks the Carnival, tranquilizing anybody they suspect of being a warlock. They are pursued by the town police, who are aided by Moshe. The townspeople being possessed by a warlock are taken by Presidio to the Allen family home. The head of Presidio, Edith, threatens Alice, who is chained there too. Edith's motive is to wipe out all subhumans (monsters) and especially warlocks, having captured several to experiment on. She also plans to destroy all of Barrington and all evidence of their actions with it ("cleaning a mass-scale event" is what she and Presidio call it). She tries to enlist Viv with a semi-plausible argument, offering her the option to stop the violence and work with Praesidio to understand more about Warlocks and Monsters. She also claims Praesidio's main goal is to study monsters, which is a lie. Dolores reconciles with Geoff, explaining how she and Fred came to adopt them. Meanwhile, Fred is in a limbo state between life and death, conversing with the twins' real father, Omari. The twins join hands in the family house, allowing them to find Alice and restore her powers. Alice releases Dolores, who she was being transported with, and with their different skills they corner Edith, and Alice kills her. Moshe teams up with Police Chief Fernandez: they are both after Alice now. Maggie Allen, Fred's estranged mother, takes over Presidio, which could be good for all the Allens. But we see Samuel and Seth (possessing the murderer's body) in cells inside Presidio. A loose thread- whether Fred rejoins the world from limbo- is not resolved.

== Production ==
=== Development ===
On September 28, 2018, it was announced that Netflix had given the production a series order for a first season consisting of ten episodes. Damian Kindler, Director X, Megan Follows, Mina Shum, and David Frazee are set to direct some episodes. The series was created by Damian Kindler who will also act as writer and executive producer. Additional executive producers are set to include James Thorpe, Steve Niles, Thomas Walden, Eric Birnberg, George Strayton and Melissa Blake. Production companies involved with the series include High Park Entertainment and IDW Entertainment. On March 30, 2020, Netflix cancelled the series after one season.

=== Casting ===
Sometime after the series order announcement, it was confirmed that Tamara Taylor, J.C. MacKenzie, Aurora Burghart, Gabriel Darku, Wendy Crewson, Megan Follows and Stephen McHattie would star in the series. In October 2018, Maxim Roy was cast in a recurring role.

=== Filming ===
Filming for the first season took place on location in Cambridge, Ontario from September to December 2018.

== Release ==
On January 8, 2020, Netflix released the official trailer for the series.

== Reception ==
On Rotten Tomatoes, the series holds an approval rating of 29% with an average rating of 5.5/10, based on 7 reviews. Complaints were made about unfinished plotlines but some reviewers found the series quirky and entertaining, regretting its cancellation after one season.
