= Gabriel Darku =

Canadian actor

- Born: March 25, 1995 (age 31); Saint John, New Brunswick, Canada
- Education: Toronto Film School
- Occupation: Actor
- Years active: 2015–present

Gabriel Darku (born March 25, 1995) is a Canadian actor, best known for his role as Geoff Allen in the Netflix series October Faction. Some of his other notable roles include Trey in ReBoot: The Guardian Code, Connor Rijkers in Slasher, Roger Faide in The Fore-men, Dylan in Imperfect High, Everett in The Great Christmas Switch, and Pete in Ruby and the Well. He has appeared in television and streaming productions, primarily in science fiction and supernatural genres.

== Life and career ==
Gabriel Darku was born in Saint John, New Brunswick and raised in Yellowknife, Northwest Territories, Canada. He became interested in acting after appearing in a McDonald's television commercial in 2012. During his school years, he competed as a national-level gymnast and pursued music, teaching himself to play guitar and drums while also playing saxophone at high school concerts and in jazz bands.

Darku later moved to Toronto, where he studied at the Toronto Film School, earning a diploma in Acting for Film, TV, and Theatre.

In 2015, Darku made his television debut in Heroes Reborn: Dark Matters, a digital companion series to NBC's Heroes Reborn. He later played Trey/Frag in the 2018 YTV/Netflix series ReBoot: The Guardian Code, a modern adaptation of the 1990s animated series that combined live-action and CGI.

In 2019, Darku starred as Geoff Allen in the supernatural drama television series October Faction, based on the comic book series by Steve Niles and Damien Worm. His other television credits include appearances in American Gods, Private Eyes, and Impulse.

== Filmography ==
=== Television ===
Year	Title	Role	Notes
2015	Heroes Reborn: Dark Matters	Brian	Web series
2016	Shadowhunters	Jeremy	Recurring role
2018	ReBoot: The Guardian Code	Trey / Frag	Main role
2018	Impulse	Zach Jaymes	Recurring role
2019–2023	Slasher	Connor Rijkers / Detective Kenneth Rijkers	Main role (Seasons 3 & 5)
2019	American Gods	Young Shadow	Guest role
2020	October Faction	Geoff Allen	Main role
2021	The Expanse	Yoan	Recurring role
2021	The Great Christmas Switch	Everett	Television film
2022–2024	Ruby and the Well	Pete Evans	Guest role
