= David Greenman =

American actor (born 1977)

David Greenman (born October 27, 1977, in Syracuse, New York) is an American actor best known for portraying the character of Danny McCall from 2005 to 2006 on the ABC daytime soap opera General Hospital.

== Biography ==
Greenman was born and raised in Manlius, New York, a suburb of Syracuse. His parents are a judge and nurse, and he has one younger sister. He graduated from Fayetteville-Manlius High School and attended Cornell University, where he was a pre-med theatre arts major.

He performed and directed theatre during college, and then moved to Los Angeles where he has worked as an actor and screenwriter. In addition to his role on General Hospital, he has recurred on Bones as "FBI Forensic Tech Marcus Geier" and in the role of "Fred" on Gilmore Girls, and has also guest-starred on According To Jim, Monk, The Mentalist, Weeds, and The New Adventures of Old Christine.

== Filmography ==
- About Last Night (2014)
