= Tamara Taylor =

Canadian actress (born 1970)

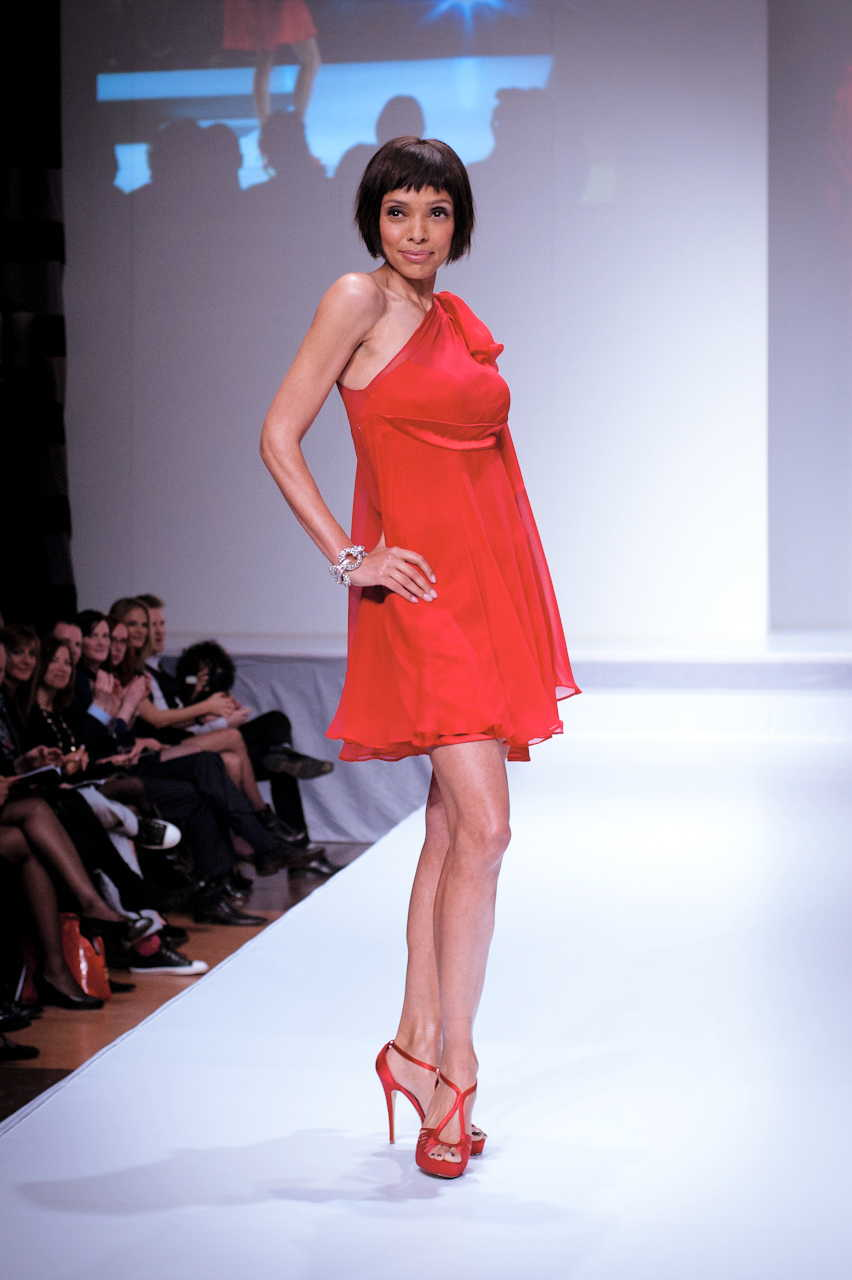
- Taylor in 2012
- Born: September 27, 1970 (age 55); Toronto, Ontario, Canada
- Occupation: Actress
- Years active: 1987–Present
- Spouse: Miles Cooley (m. 2007; div. 2012)

Tamara Taylor (born September 27, 1970) is a Canadian actress. She appeared in the role of Dr. Camille Saroyan, head of the Forensic Division, in the forensic crime drama Bones. She also appeared in season seven of Agents of S.H.I.E.L.D., in which she played Sibyl, one of the two main antagonists. She also starred in the first two seasons of Law & Order: Organized Crime.

== Early life and career ==
Taylor was born in Toronto to a Bajan father and a Scottish mother. She dropped out of high school to try modeling and see the world, with her mother supportive of her decision: "School will always be there, she told me."

She has appeared in the CBS medical drama 3 lbs as Della and the UPN series Sex, Love & Secrets in the role of Nina; both series were short-lived.

Taylor has made guest appearances on NCIS, Numb3rs, Lost, CSI: Miami, Without a Trace, Party of Five and Dawson's Creek. In her feature film debut, Senseless, she played Marlon Wayans's love interest. She portrayed Debrah Simmons in the 2005 romantic-comedy Diary of a Mad Black Woman, Halle Berry's best friend in Introducing Dorothy Dandridge, and had a brief role in Serenity, the movie conclusion of the TV series Firefly by Joss Whedon. Through her part in Serenity, Taylor was able to audition for a show with actor David Boreanaz, who had previously worked with Whedon in Buffy the Vampire Slayer and Angel. She also appeared in the TV series Lost, as the former girlfriend of Michael and mother of Walt.

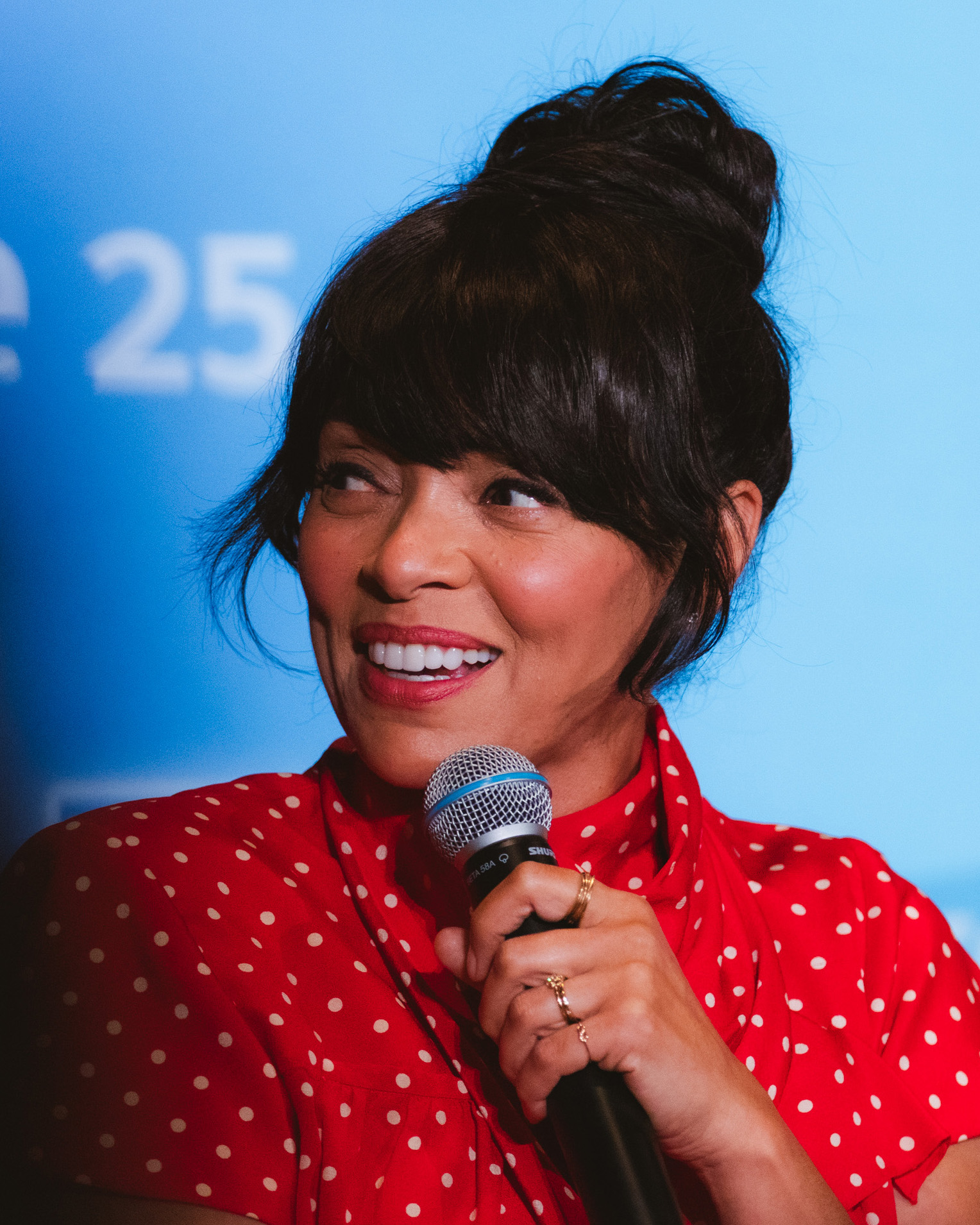
Taylor in 2025

She first appeared in Bones in the first episode of the second season, "The Titan on the Tracks", portraying the character Dr. Camille Saroyan. In the first six episodes of the season, she was credited as a guest star because creator and writer Hart Hanson had planned to kill her off in episode 12 when Howard Epps, a recurring serial killer, poisoned her, to create more tension and drama between the two main characters, but the response to her character was so strong that the writers offered her a position as a recurring regular in the show. Thus, from the following episode, "The Girl with the Curl", she was credited as a main character for the remainder of the series.

Tamara Taylor later recurred on the final season of Agents of S.H.I.E.L.D. portraying secondary antagonist Sibyl.

In October 2022, it was announced that Taylor would join the final series of the FX series Snowfall. She will appear in Season 3 of Wild Cards as Vivienne, the long-lost mother of the series' female protagonist.

== Personal life ==
Taylor married attorney Miles Cooley in 2007. They divorced in May 2012.

== Filmography ==
=== Film ===
| Year | Title | Role | Notes |
|---|---|---|---|
| 1998 | Senseless | Janice Tyson | |
| 2005 | Diary of a Mad Black Woman | Debrah Simmons | |
| 2005 | Serenity | Teacher | |
| 2007 | Gordon Glass | Karen | |
| 2011 | Shuffle | Linda | |
| 2015 | Justice League: Gods and Monsters | Bekka / Wonder Woman | Voice, direct-to-video |
| 2015 | Reluctant Nanny | Andrea Moore | |
| 2017 | August Falls | Mina | |
| 2022 | Diary of a Spy | Anna | |

=== Television ===
| Year | Title | Role | Notes |
|---|---|---|---|
| 1991 | A Different World | Roast Attendee | Uncredited; Episode: "Never Can Say Goodbye" |
| 1992 | Freshman Dorm | Carla | Episode: "The Scarlett Letter" |
| 1996–1997 | Party of Five | Grace Wilcox | 16 episodes |
| 1998 | Dawson's Creek | Laura Weston | 2 episodes |
| 1999 | Early Edition | Meredith Armstrong | Episode: "Blowing Up is Hard to Do" |
| 1999 | Providence | Tracy Doyle | Episode: "The Phantom Menace" |
| 1999 | Introducing Dorothy Dandridge | Geri Nicholas | Television film |
| 2000 | City of Angels | Dr. Ana Syphax | 14 episodes |
| 2002–2003 | Hidden Hills | Sarah Timmerman | 18 episodes |
| 2003 | Miracles | Dr. Linda Qualey | Episode: "The Ferguson Syndrome" |
| 2003 | Everwood | Dr. Lence | Episode: "Daddy's Little Girl" |
| 2003 | Becker | Dana McCall | Episode: "The Unbelievable Wrongness of Talking" |
| 2003 | Without a Trace | Tracy McAllister | Episode: "Trip Box" |
| 2004 | The District | Agent Midge Halpern | Episode: "A.K.A." |
| 2004 | Six Feet Under | Inez | Episode: "Bomb Shelter" |
| 2004 | CSI: Miami | Dr. Leslie Harrison | Episode: "Crime Wave" |
| 2004 | One on One | Judy | Episode: "Who Brought the Jive Turkey?" |
| 2005 | Lost | Susan Porter | 2 episodes |
| 2005 | Sex, Love & Secrets | Nina | 8 episodes |
| 2005–2006 | NCIS | Special Agent Cassie Yates | Episode: S2 "SWAK” & S3 “Jeopardy” |
| 2006 | Numbers | Olivia Rawlings | Episode: "The O.G." |
| 2006 | 3 lbs | Della | Episode: "Lost for Words" |
| 2006–2017 | Bones | Dr. Camille Saroyan | Main role (seasons 2-12); 223 episodes |
| 2015 | Hell's Kitchen | Herself | Episode: "4 Chefs Compete" |
| 2015 | Justice League: Gods and Monsters Chronicles | Bekka / Wonder Woman | Voice; Episode: "Big" |
| 2018 | Altered Carbon | Oumou Prescott | 5 episodes |
| 2019 | The L Word: Generation Q | Maya | Episode: "Lapse in Judgement" |
| 2020 | October Faction | Deloris Allen | 10 episodes |
| 2020 | Agents of S.H.I.E.L.D. | Sibyl | 5 episodes |
| 2021–2022 | Law & Order: Organized Crime | Angela Wheatley | 15 episodes |
| 2021 | Law & Order: Special Victims Unit | Angela Wheatley | Episode: "The People v. Richard Wheatley" |
| 2023 | Snowfall | Cassandra Turner | 5 episodes |
| 2025 | All's Fair | Det. Camila Monroe | Episode: "This Is Me Trying" |
| 2026 | Wild Cards | Vivienne | |
