= Bones (TV series) =

American procedural drama television series (2005–2017)

- Genre: Police procedural Drama
- Created by: Hart Hanson
- Inspired by: The life of forensic anthropologist and author Kathy Reichs
- Showrunners: Hart Hanson; Stephan Nathan; Michael Peterson; Jonathan Collier
- Starring: David Boreanaz; Emily Deschanel; Michaela Conlin; Eric Millegan; T. J. Thyne; Jonathan Adams; Tamara Taylor; John Francis Daley; John Boyd
- Theme music composer: The Crystal Method
- Composers: Peter Himmelman; Sean Callery
- Country of origin: United States
- Original language: English
- No. of seasons: 12
- No. of episodes: 246 (list of episodes)

Production
- Executive producers: Hart Hanson; Barry Josephson; Stephen Nathan; Ian Toynton; Carla Kettner; Jonathan Collier; Michael Peterson; Randy Zisk
- Producers: Kathy Reichs; Emily Deschanel; David Boreanaz; Gene Hong
- Running time: 43 minutes
- Production companies: Josephson Entertainment; Far Field Productions; 20th Century Fox Television

Original release
- Network: Fox
- Release: September 13, 2005 – March 28, 2017

Related
- The Finder

Bones is an American police procedural drama television series created by Hart Hanson for Fox. It premiered on September 13, 2005, and concluded on March 28, 2017, airing for 246 episodes over 12 seasons. The show is based on forensic anthropology and forensic archaeology, with each episode focusing on a Federal Bureau of Investigation (FBI) case file concerning the mystery behind human remains brought by FBI Special Agent Seeley Booth (David Boreanaz) to Temperance "Bones" Brennan (Emily Deschanel), a forensic anthropologist. It also explores the personal lives of the characters. The rest of the main cast includes Michaela Conlin, T. J. Thyne, Eric Millegan, Jonathan Adams, Tamara Taylor, John Francis Daley, and John Boyd.

The series is based on the life and novels of forensic anthropologist Kathy Reichs, who also produced the show. Its title character, Temperance Brennan, is named after the protagonist of Reichs' crime novel series. In the Bones universe, Brennan writes successful mystery novels featuring a fictional forensic anthropologist named Kathy Reichs.

Bones is a joint production by Josephson Entertainment and Far Field Productions in association with 20th Century Fox Television and syndicated by 20th Television. The series is the longest-running one-hour drama series produced by 20th Century Fox Television.

== Premise ==
The premise of the show is an alliance between forensic anthropologist Temperance "Bones" Brennan and FBI Special Agent Seeley Booth. Brennan is the central character and team leader of the fictional Jeffersonian Institute Medico-Legal Lab, a federal institution that collaborates with the FBI. This reflects the historical relationship between the FBI and scientists of the Smithsonian Institution. Set in Washington, D.C., the show revolves around solving federal legal cases by examining the human remains of possible murder victims. While the majority of their cases take place in the surrounding Washington metropolitan area, they have been called in to investigate cases in other locales, including Mexico, Argentina, and Iran.

Brennan and her team provide scientific expertise, and Booth provides FBI criminal investigation techniques. In addition to the prospective murder cases featured in each episode, the series explores the backgrounds and relationships of its characters, particularly the romantic tension between Brennan and Booth. An important ongoing dynamic between Brennan and Booth is their disagreement about science and faith. Brennan argues for science, evidence, and atheism. Booth argues for intuition, faith, and God. Their relationship is highlighted by the introduction of Lance Sweets, an FBI psychologist, who not only helps inform the investigations, but also is meant to serve as a mediator for Brennan and Booth.

The series is known for its dark comedic undertones, which serve to lighten the gravity of the show's intense subject matter, human bodies in an advanced state of decay. While many of the cases they investigate are self-contained to singular episodes, and generally deal with murders that are motivated by personal desires, the team does occasionally investigate serial killers – such as the Gravedigger, the Puppeteer, Howard Epps, and Gormogon – and politically charged perpetrators such as Jacob Broadsky.

The series also features the interpersonal relationships of the Jeffersonian staff – including pathologist and coroner Camille Saroyan, forensic artist Angela Montenegro, entomologist Jack Hodgins, and a rotating set of interns who assist Dr. Brennan – and how their cases and victims affect their views and lives.

== Cast and characters ==
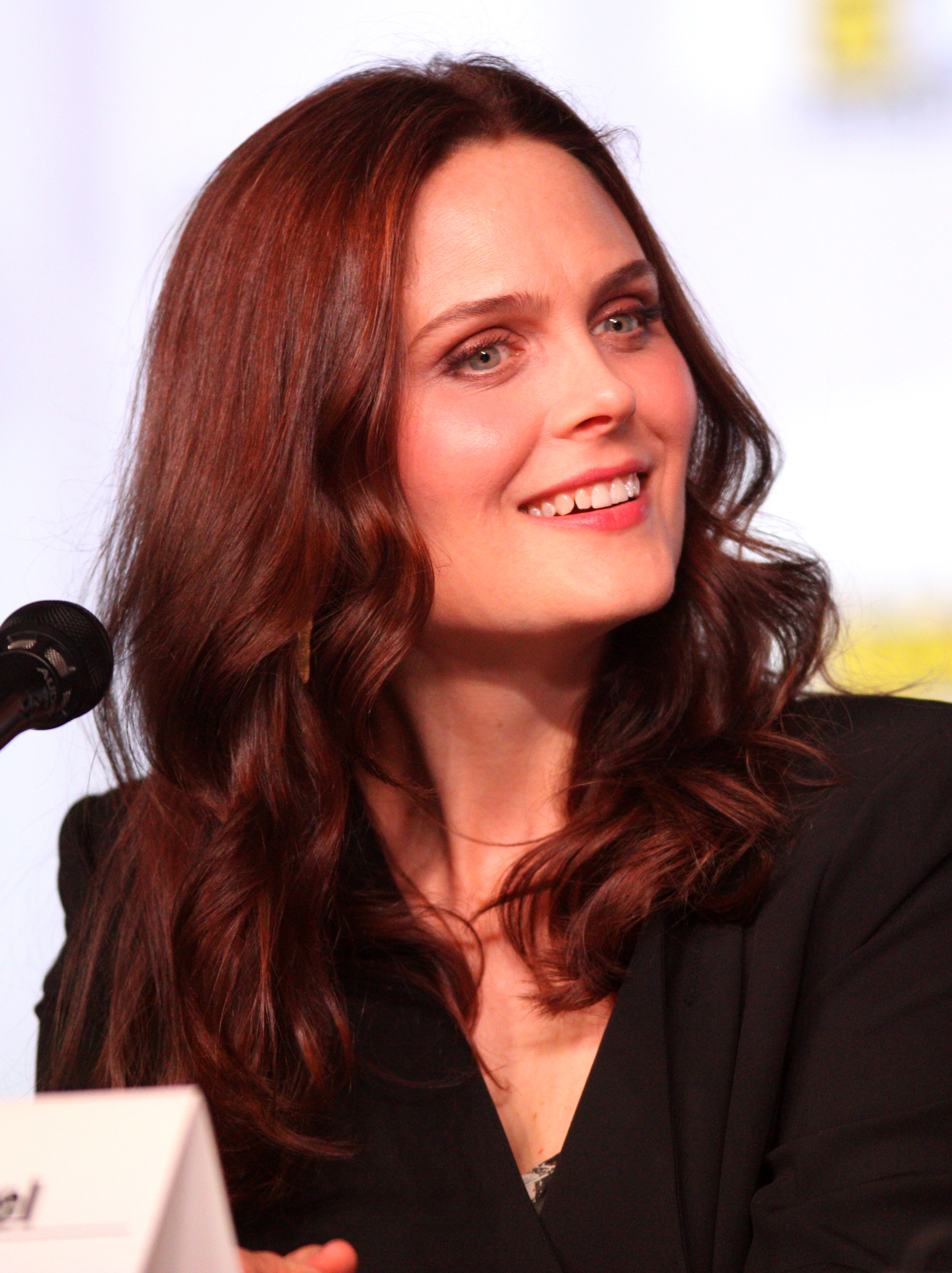
Emily Deschanel portrays Temperance "Bones" Brennan

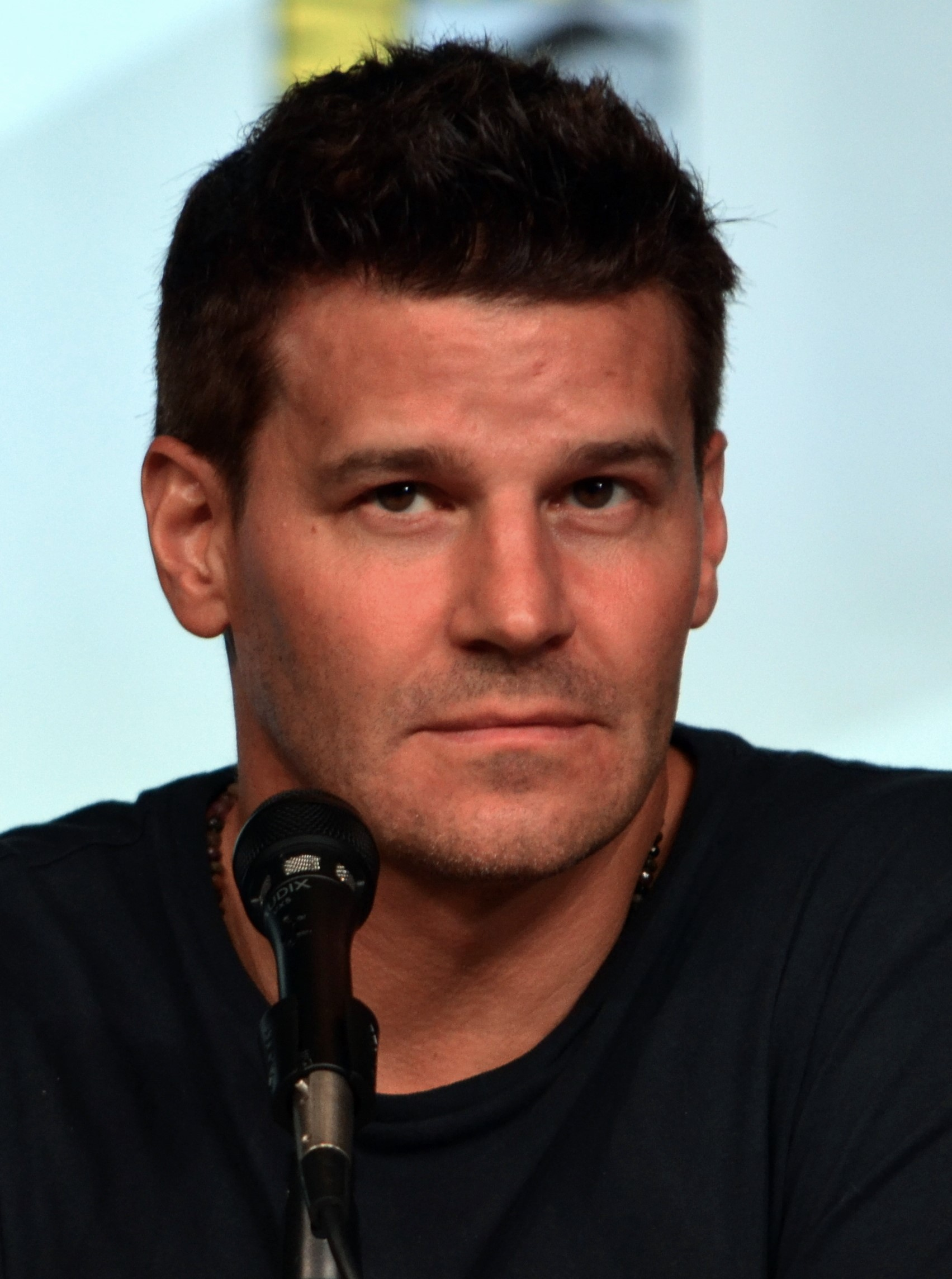
David Boreanaz portrays Seeley Booth

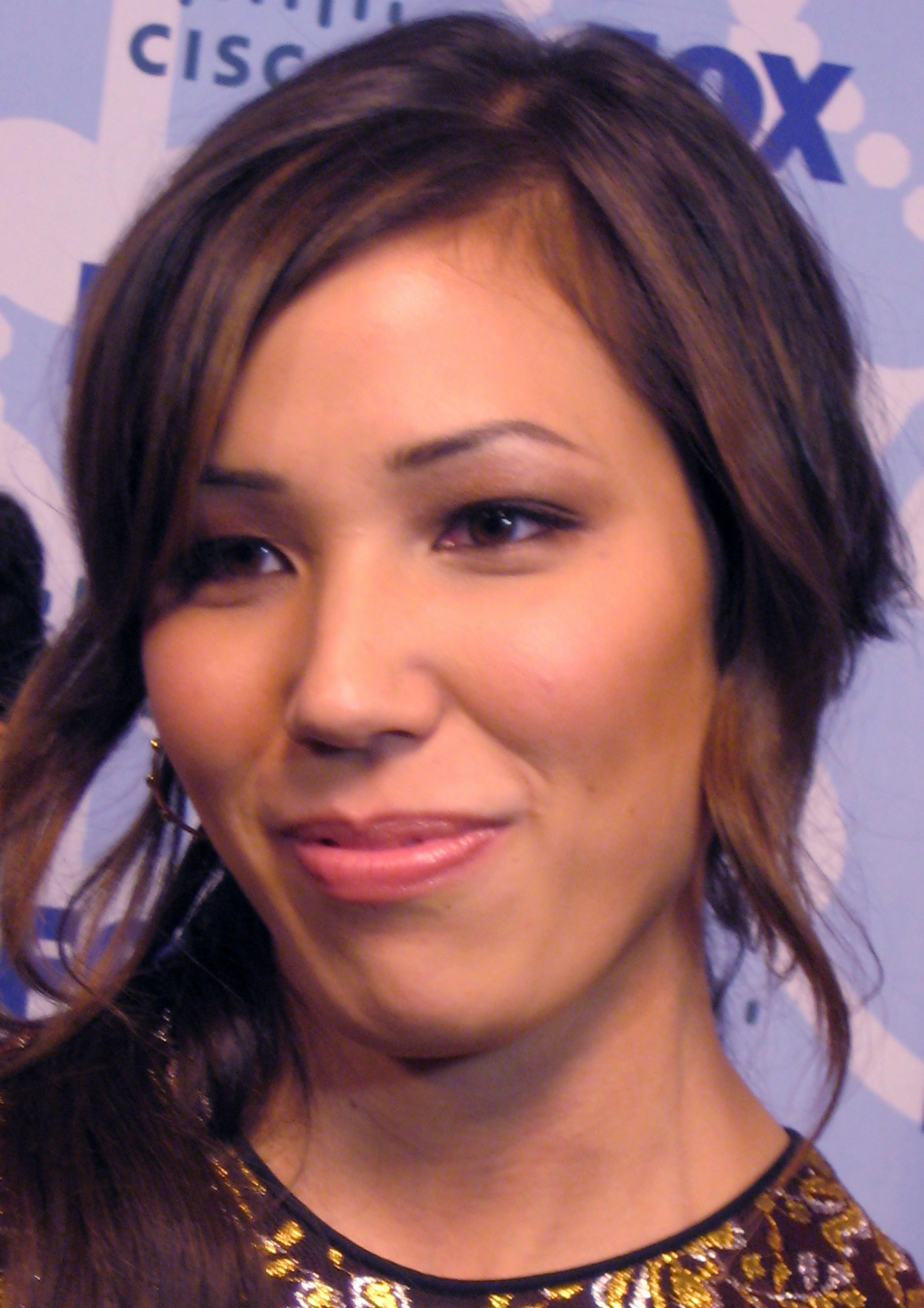
Michaela Conlin portrays Angela Montenegro

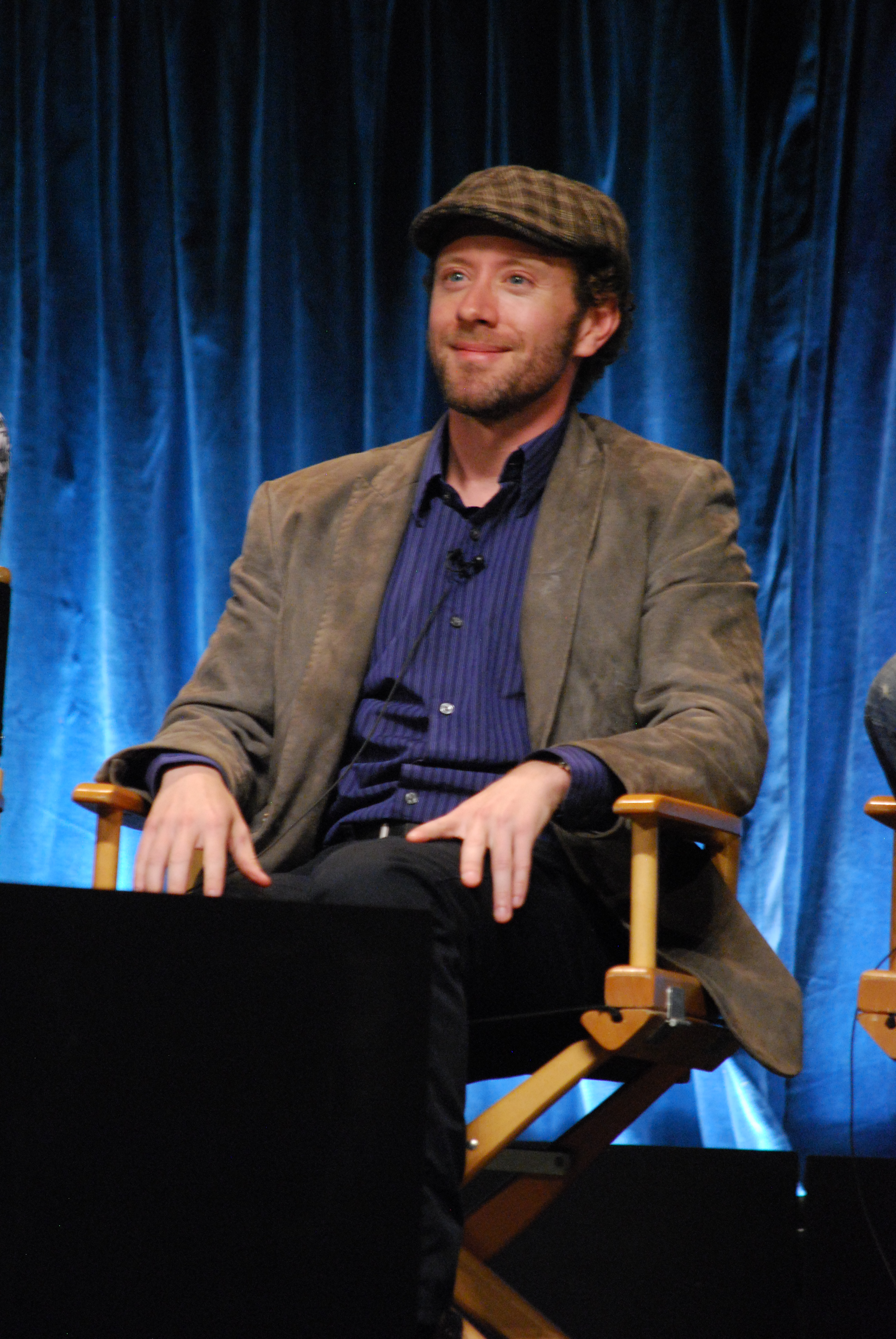
T. J. Thyne portrays Jack Hodgins

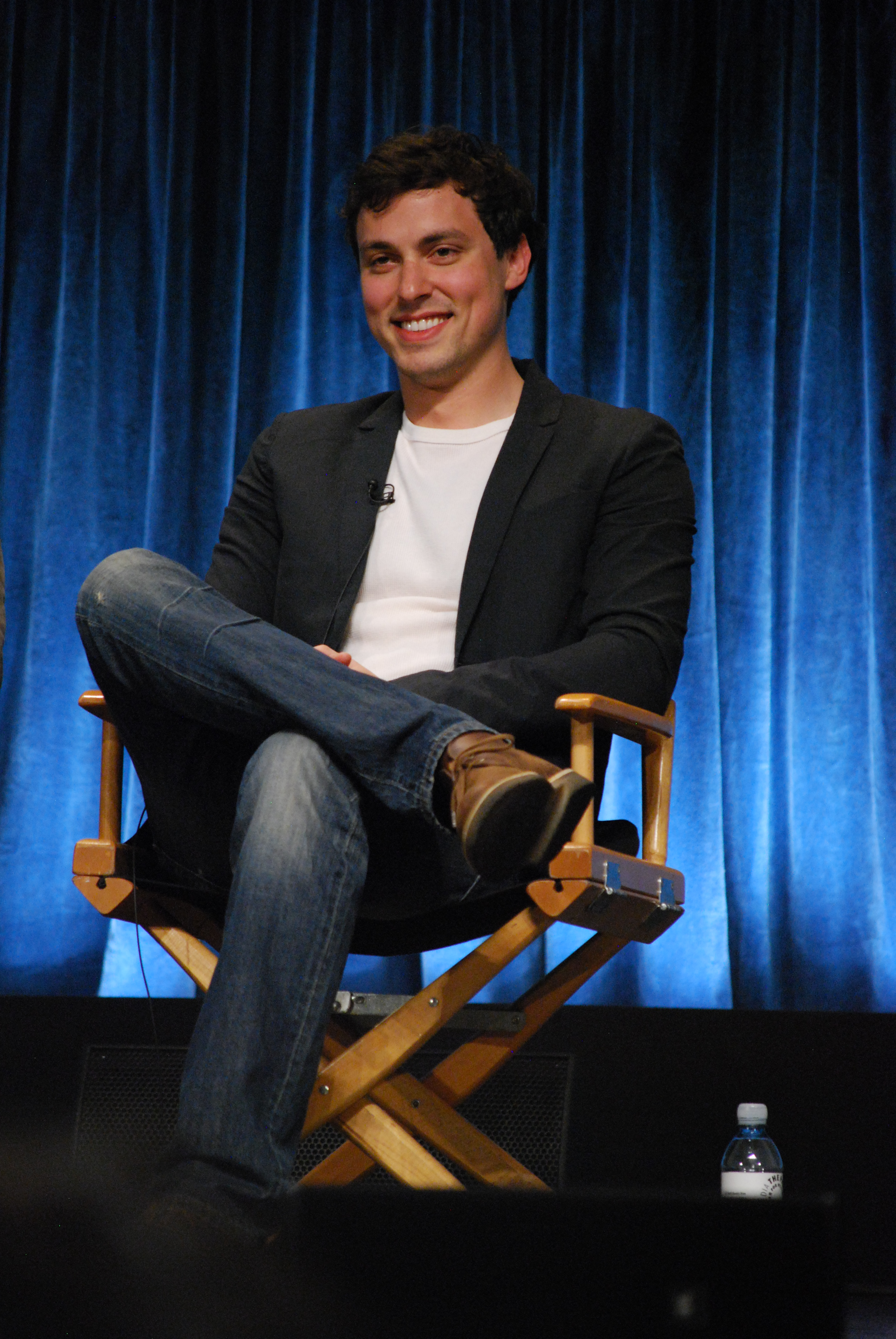
John Francis Daley portrays Lance Sweets

=== Main cast ===
- Emily Deschanel as Temperance "Bones" Brennan: A brilliant forensic anthropologist, she works at the renowned Jeffersonian Institute located in Washington, D.C. Her birth name was Joy Keenan, which her parents changed after they turned away from a life of crime, and she was educated at Northwestern University. She is an empiricist and a wealthy author of crime fiction drawn from her experiences. She is an atheist and a staunch believer in facts and evidence, to the exclusion of feelings; consequently, she comes off as distant and detached. Her lack of social skills provides most of the show's lighthearted humor, primarily through her catchphrase, "I don't know what that means," whenever a pop culture reference is introduced into the conversation. She is noted to have a high IQ and impressive reasoning skills. Despite being superficially very different, Booth and she share a deep connection and begin a relationship near the end of season six. In season seven, they have a daughter together, whom they name Christine, in honor of Temperance's late mother. They marry in season nine. Their son, Hank, named after Booth's paternal grandfather, is born in season 11. She is also stepmother to Booth's son from a previous relationship, Parker.
- David Boreanaz as Seeley Booth: FBI Special Agent Booth seeks out Brennan's professional help in his investigations involving human remains that cannot be identified without her skills. His character is often used as an audience surrogate to provide a layman's translation of the scientific jargon-filled dialogue, especially in the "squints" conversations, or laboratory scenes. He gives Brennan her nickname, "Bones", which she first hates, but comes to accept. He is a skilled investigator and interrogator who often relies on his "gut" and "cop instincts" (qualities foreign to Brennan). He is a decorated veteran of the United States Army Rangers, where he was a sniper. Booth has a son, Parker, from a previous relationship, and a younger brother, Jared, an officer in the U.S. Navy. He has two children with Brennan: a daughter, Christine, and a son, Hank. Raised in the Roman Catholic church, Booth is a devout believer in God and heaven. He frequently debates spiritual issues with Brennan, who regards all religions as primitive superstitions unsupported by empirical evidence. He plays hockey on a team with intern Wendell Bray, with whom he is close. He is purportedly a member of the well-known Booth family, and as such is related to Lincoln's assassin John Wilkes Booth.
- Michaela Conlin as Angela Montenegro: A forensic artist at the Jeffersonian Institute and Brennan's best friend, Montenegro is also her team specialist in forensic facial reconstruction—helping identify the victims. She can also generate holograms using her three-dimensional graphics program (the "Angelator" and later, the "Angelatron") to simulate various scenarios of a crime to help determine the cause of death. She and Brennan are best friends and rarely argue. She is open, friendly, and caring and repeatedly tries to draw Brennan out of the lab. She is often described as a free spirit. Angela's father is played by Billy Gibbons, guitarist of ZZ Top, who guest stars as a fictional version of himself. In season two, Angela begins a relationship with Jack Hodgins. They try to wed, but Angela discovers she is already married to a man she barely remembers; after her divorce from him is finalized, she and Hodgins break up. During this time, Angela dates intern Wendell Bray, but she marries Hodgins in season five and gives birth to their son, Michael Vincent, in season six. Her birth name is Pookie Noodlin, as revealed in the 10th season.
- Eric Millegan as Dr. Zack Addy (seasons 1–3; guest star, seasons 4–5, 11–12) is introduced in season one as Brennan's graduate student and intern. In season two, he receives his doctorates in forensic anthropology and applied engineering, and joins the staff of the Jeffersonian as a full-fledged professional. Like Brennan, his inability to pick up on Booth, Hodgins, and Montenegro's pop-culture jokes and references is a running gag and a source of humorously awkward moments in the lab, though he has shown he has other "normal" interests such as being a basketball fan and a trained singer. A recurring element in the show involves Addy and Hodgins amicably but resolutely competing to be "King of the Lab". In the episode, "The Pain in the Heart", a trophy, presented to him by Saroyan that recognizes Zack as "King of the Lab", is revealed. Zack is removed from his position on Brennan's team in the season three finale, "The Pain in the Heart", when he is revealed to be the apprentice of the serial killer Gormogon. He resides in a psychiatric facility after pleading insanity to avoid a prison term, as Hodgins told him he "would not do well" in the general prison population. At the end of season 11, Zack escapes the facility after he is suspected of being another serial killer called "The Puppeteer". At the beginning of season 12, Zack is exonerated when his doctor is proven to be the killer, instead. Zack confesses his innocence in the Gormogon murders to Booth and Brennan. A major storyline in season 12 is exonerating Zack. In the penultimate episode, "A Day in the Life", Zack is exonerated of murder thanks to Hodgins, with help from Brennan and Caroline Julian at his hearing. However, the judge rules that he must finish out the last 13 months of his sentence for the separate crime of aiding a known killer. Zack remains institutionalized, albeit with a release date just over a year away.
- T. J. Thyne as Jack Hodgins is an entomologist who is also an expert on spores and minerals, but whose hobby is conspiracy theories. Hodgins regularly identifies as the lab's "bug and slime guy". During an investigation, he primarily deals with particulates and trace evidence, and at the crime scene will provide Booth with an approximate time of death. He is best friends with former coworker Zack Addy and often tries to "educate" him on social norms. They often compete for the title of "King of the Lab", referring to whoever has more useful information in the investigation at hand. His family owns the fictional Cantilever Group, and he is extremely wealthy and is a major sponsor of the Jeffersonian. However, Hodgins tries to keep this concealed from his colleagues. It eventually comes out during an investigation, but no one allows his family's wealth to significantly affect their relationship with him. He later loses all his money due to the scheming of serial killer Christopher Pelant, but in time, Hodgins regains a considerable portion of it. He sells a hot sauce he develops in collaboration with intern Finn Abernathy, which becomes immensely popular. Later, he develops an unbreakable beaker and a polymer floor mat. He marries Angela Montenegro in season five. She gives birth to their son, Michael Vincent, in season six. In season 11, Hodgins is wounded in a bomb attack and left paralyzed from the waist down. At the end of the series, Hodgins is promoted to temporary head of the Jeffersonian lab while Cam and Arastoo are on leave after their wedding.
- Jonathan Adams as Daniel Goodman (season 1): An archaeologist turned administrator, he is the director of the Jeffersonian Institute. He is a loving husband and father to a pair of five-year-old twin girls. His way of working leads Hodgins to think of him as subjective, long-winded, and lacking the qualities of a pure scientist, although the antagonism between the two develops into a friendly rivalry as the season progresses. He has not made any appearances beyond season one. As of episode 23, "The Titan on the Tracks", he is said to be on sabbatical, and is not seen for the rest of the series.
- Tamara Taylor as Camille Saroyan (seasons 2–12) succeeds Dr. Goodman as the head of the forensic division at Jeffersonian Institute and is a pathologist. She was a coroner in New York City. Cam had a romantic relationship with Booth before she joined the Jeffersonian, and a brief relationship during the show. At first, Brennan and she have an uneasy working relationship, but she grows to be an integral member of the Jeffersonian team and well respected by all of its members, including Brennan. In season four, she adopts 16-year-old Michelle, whose father Cam previously dated and lived with, after Michelle's father is murdered. Later in the series, she becomes romantically involved with intern Arastoo Vaziri. They marry in the series' penultimate episode "The Day in the Life", taking a sabbatical after the final case is concluded.
- John Francis Daley as Lance Sweets (seasons 3–10) is an FBI psychologist assigned to Booth and Brennan after Booth arrests her father. He is frequently consulted to provide a profile of the suspects and victims involved and to give a more "humanized" perspective on the case. Due to his age, he is initially treated by Booth and the Jeffersonian team in a condescending manner, but eventually earns their respect and their friendship; another FBI psychologist notes to Brennan and Booth that Sweets has imprinted onto them like a duckling, and he briefly lived with them. Throughout the series, he has an on-again/off-again relationship with intern Daisy Wick. He eventually is accepted by Brennan, who notably dismisses psychology as a "soft science", and is often sought out for advice by the team on both professional and personal matters. In the season 10 premiere, Daisy and he are revealed to be expecting a baby and that they had gotten married. Soon after, he is fatally assaulted while serving a warrant. He dies with Booth and Brennan by his side.
- John Boyd as James Aubrey (seasons 10–12) is a junior FBI agent working under Booth after Sweets's death. Originally, Aubrey tries to win Booth's approval and trust, as Booth is reluctant to work with him due to Aubrey's inexperience and his grief for Sweets. However, he is eventually accepted by Booth and the rest of the team. Aubrey gets along with everyone, and his love of food is often the subject of jokes. When he was a child, his father was an investment broker who cheated his clients and fled the country, abandoning Aubrey and his mother and leaving them with nothing. In season 11, Aubrey's father is found to be back in the country. In season 12, Aubrey is finally approached by his father, who asks him for money. He reveals he has another wife and young son back in the country where he had fled, to persuade Aubrey to give him financial aid. However, Aubrey realizes it is all a lie and eventually turns his father in. Near the end of season 12, Aubrey is offered a promotion to supervisory special agent in Los Angeles. Though Aubrey originally took the Los Angeles job, he instead decides to take a similar position in Washington, D.C., in the series finale.

=== Recurring cast ===
- Loren Dean as Russ Brennan (seasons 1–3): Russ Brennan, or Kyle Keenan, is the older brother of Temperance Brennan - Joy Keenan, and the son of Max Keenan. Russ has a troubled past and has spent some time in prison. He is involved with a woman named Amy Hollister and loves her two daughters, Emma and Hayley. After Temperance and he were abandoned by their parents, he also abandoned his sister, which led to long-held animosity from her. He first appears in the season one finale, where he patches things up with his sister and also reunites with his father in season two. His last appearance is in season three, although he is mentioned in later seasons.
- Billy Gibbons as Angela Montenegro's father (seasons 1–10): The character is a fictionalized version of Gibbons himself–a bearded guitarist in a famous rock band that plays sold-out stadium shows–but despite all the knowing winks to him being Gibbons, the character is never named, only referred to in dialogue as "Angela's father", "Dad," "my father".
- Patricia Belcher as Caroline Julian (seasons 1–12): Caroline is the acerbic, witty, and often meddlesome assistant U.S. attorney (AUSA) from the U.S. Department of Justice. She is a friend of Booth's and is always willing, if not eager, to help his partner and him in their cases. She gives Booth a hard time after he accidentally wrecks her prized AMC Gremlin in the course of a hot pursuit.
- Ryan O'Neal as Max Keenan (seasons 2–12): Max Keenan, or Matthew Brennan, is the father of Russ and Temperance Brennan. His wife and he were nonviolent bank robbers who became involved with gangs in the 1970s. They changed their identities to lead honest lives with their children. Booth arrests Max on murder charges in season two, and he is tried in season three. The jury finds him not guilty on all counts and he is released, finally able to reconnect openly with his children. He is a frequent presence in Brennan and Booth's lives, particularly after the birth of his granddaughter Christine. During season 12, he dies while protecting his grandchildren.
- Stephen Fry as Gordon Wyatt (seasons 2, 4–5, 12) who is an FBI psychiatrist and later becomes a chef.
- Eugene Byrd as Clark Edison (seasons 3–12) is the most serious and professional of the Jeffersonian interns, as well as the most organized; he initially dislikes discussing his personal life and his coworkers' personal lives while at work. While Brennan is on the run after being suspected of murder, Cam hires Clark as the new forensic anthropologist. After Brennan's return, Cam keeps him on to focus on archaeological work while Brennan works on criminal investigations.
- Brendan Fehr as Jared Booth (seasons 4–5) is Agent Seeley Booth's younger brother, who is notorious for getting into trouble. However, in a continuing "Gravedigger" episode, Jared uses his military contacts to help save his brother's life, at the cost of his Navy career. In seasons four and five, his appearances are troublesome to his older brother, especially when he announces his engagement to a former escort, whom he later divorces. In season 11, the trend continues, but this time with a much more dire outcome, as Jared is the newest victim for the Jeffersonian. Detached forensic work on Brennan's part is needed to discover that his remains are not those of Seeley Booth.
- Ryan Cartwright as Vincent Nigel-Murray (seasons 4–6) is an Englishman and a graduate of the University of Leeds. He has a habit of reciting trivia while working. In season six, he is fatally shot in the chest by sniper Jacob Broadsky; his death ends up being the catalyst in Booth and Brennan's relationship. Hodgins and Angela give their son the second middle name Vincent.
- Michael Grant Terry as Wendell Bray (seasons 4–12) is Dr. Brennan's top scholarship intern. He dates Angela briefly during season five and is close friends with Booth, who regards Wendell as the most relatable of the interns. In season nine, he is diagnosed with Ewing's sarcoma by Brennan after breaking his arm during a hockey game. After seeking treatment, he appears to be in full remission and continues to work at the lab. In late season 12, after Wendell has trouble writing his thesis, Brennan helps him realize that his passion is not forensic anthropology after all. By the end of the series, Wendell intends to leave the Jeffersonian to find his true passion.
- Carla Gallo as Daisy Wick (seasons 4–12): Overeager and somewhat manipulative, she is often annoying to other workers at the Jeffersonian, though she eventually develops a close friendship with Hodgins. She has an on-again, off-again relationship with Lance Sweets. Sweets also helps Daisy and the others in the lab get along with each other. They later have a son named Seeley Lance Wick-Sweets, born some months after his father's death.
- Joel David Moore as Colin Fisher (seasons 4–12) has depression and has a very dark sense of humor. He sometimes spends time at mental-health facilities for treatment, so is the intern least often shown working in the lab. He is adept at estimating bone remodeling.
- Pej Vahdat as Arastoo Vaziri (seasons 4–12) starts by having a fake Iranian accent, so he does not have to constantly explain his Islamic beliefs, but later admits it is fake. He is a sensitive and devout man, and begins dating Cam in season eight; they become engaged in season 11 and get married in season 12.
- Luke Kleintank as Finn Abernathy (seasons 7–9) is the youngest intern to date, and has a messy background that includes a stay at a juvenile detention center. He is from North Carolina and has a thick Southern accent, which leads Hodgins to call him "Opie". Finn, in turn, calls Hodgins, who is from a very wealthy family, "Thurston". Hodgins and he go into business together to sell a hot sauce that Abernathy's grandmother made before she died, after Hodgins uses traces from Abernathy's last bottle of the sauce to reverse-engineer the recipe. Cam's daughter Michelle and he fall in love and begin dating, initially behind her mother's back. She later breaks up with him after moving away to college, realizing that the distance and new developments in their lives have caused them to drift apart.
- Brian Klugman as Oliver Wells (seasons 8–11) is a lab assistant who arrogantly boasts of his 160 IQ. He has multiple doctorates in various subjects and is the only intern who is a physician. He struggles to get along with all of the lab members. Brennan and he butt heads, especially after he tells her that he aims to surpass her reputation. A self declared polymath, he has a wide, if indolent, range of interests, from physics to psychology.
- Laura Spencer as Jessica Warren (seasons 9–12) grew up in an educational cooperative. She has five older brothers and she graduated from Michigan State University top of her class at the age of 19. She desires creativity in science, which contrasts with Brennan's insistence upon no speculation. She believes in trusting her gut. She is somewhat outspoken. In season 9, she first appears in the episode "The Drama in the Queen". At the end of the episode, she has a one-night stand with Sweets. In season 11, she engages in a relationship with FBI agent James Aubrey, which ends in season 12.
- Ignacio Serricchio as Rodolfo Fuentes (seasons 9–12) is a Cuban forensic anthropologist seeking asylum in the U.S. While he was already a qualified forensic anthropologist in Cuba, he is working towards the same qualifications in America. He is also a shameless flirt and has openly flirted with Angela and Brennan, both of whom are married. Though Angela was flattered by his attentions, both women turned down his advances. Despite his flirting, Hodgins takes him under his wing and becomes a good friend to him. He carries his father's prayer beads with him despite not believing in God because he believes that one needs to experience a little bit of everything to make good life decisions. While starting as an intern, Fuentes eventually gets his doctorate and joins the Jeffersonian staff in season 12.
- Sara Rue as Karen Delfs (seasons 11–12) is a flaky behavioral analyst assigned to help Booth and Bones on a case. She asked Agent Aubrey out, but he was seeing Jessica Warren at the time. She transferred to Kansas after a few episodes, but she returned in the first episode of season 12 after being sexually harassed at that job by her married boss. She was accused of being the one out to kill Bones (she had the requisite psychological skills), but was cleared when they discovered the real killer. In the second-to-last episode, Aubrey got falling-down drunk at Cam and Arastoo's wedding reception. Karen had Jessica bring him to her apartment to recover, since it was closer to the reception hall. In the final episode, she learned that Aubrey and Jessica had broken up. She bought him some fried chicken and they went off to eat comfort food and commiserate. The implication was that they were on the verge of starting a relationship.

== Production ==
=== Conception ===
The concept of Bones was developed during the latter part of the pitching season of 2004 when 20th Century Fox approached series creator Hart Hanson with an idea for a forensics show. Hanson was asked to meet with executive producer Barry Josephson, who had purchased the rights to produce a documentary on the forensic anthropologist and author Kathy Reichs. Although Hanson was reluctant about being involved in making a police procedural, he signed on and wrote the pilot episode after having an intensive meeting with Josephson about the show. As the show is based on the works of Reichs, the writers constantly involve her in the process of producing the episodes' story lines. Although the show's main character is also loosely based on Reichs, producers decided to name her Temperance Brennan, after the character in Reichs' novels; Reichs has stated that she views the show as somewhat of a prequel to her novels, with the TV show's Temperance Brennan as a younger version of the novels' Temperance Brennan.

In order to make Bones a unique crime drama in the midst of the multiple procedural dramas that already populated network television, like the Law & Order and CSI franchises, Hanson decided to infuse the show with as much dark humor and character development as possible. Another element conceived for the show was the "Angelatron", a holographic projector that provides a way to replace the flashbacks often used by other procedural shows. In addition to their expositional purposes, the holographic images, which are created by visual effects, brought a unique visual style to the show that the producers were looking for.

=== Casting ===
David Boreanaz was the first actor to be cast in Bones. Series creator Hart Hanson described the actors who had auditioned for the role of Seeley Booth as "pretty boy waifs"; he immediately responded when the head of the studio, Dana Walden, suggested Boreanaz for the role. Boreanaz was offered the role but was unenthusiastic about getting involved after a difficult meeting with executive producers Barry Josephson and Hart Hanson, even though he thought the script was well-written. However, after the producers contacted him again to convince him to accept the role, Boreanaz agreed to sign on and was cast as Seeley Booth.

Emily Deschanel was cast in the role of Temperance Brennan just before production began on the Bones pilot. After Deschanel finished the film Glory Road, the film's producer Jerry Bruckheimer recommended that she audition for Bones. Deschanel impressed Hart Hanson at her audition with her assertiveness. In a tense moment in the audition scene, David Boreanaz stepped closer to Deschanel; and Deschanel held her ground rather than retreating as most of the other actresses did. Hanson remarked that, in such a situation, "90% of actors would take a step back". Deschanel was subsequently cast in the role.

Beginning with season four, Zack Addy (Eric Millegan) was replaced by a succession of lab assistants: Wendell Bray (Michael Grant Terry), Colin Fisher (Joel Moore), Arastoo Vaziri (Pej Vahdat), Vincent Nigel-Murray (Ryan Cartwright), Clark Edison (Eugene Byrd) and Daisy Wick (Carla Gallo). One—Scott Starett (played by Michael Badalucco, formerly of The Practice)—is much older than the typical grad student. Marisa Coughlan guest-starred in a few mid-season episodes as FBI agent Payton Perotta, who was brought to the Jeffersonian as a temporary substitute for Booth when he was incapacitated. Betty White guest starred as Dr. Beth Mayer, a mentor to Brennan, in seasons 11 and 12.

=== Filming ===
Most of Bones is filmed in Los Angeles, California, despite the fact that the show is mainly set in Washington, D.C., where the fictional Jeffersonian Institute is located. The external shots are of the Natural History Museum in Los Angeles and the Wallis Annenberg Building at the University of Southern California. The interiors of the Jeffersonian Institute were specially built on a large sound stage at the 20th Century Fox lot in Century City, Los Angeles. The two-part season four premiere was filmed on location in London and Oxford, England.

=== Music ===
The soundtrack album titled Bones: Original Television Soundtrack, produced by Maria Alonte McCoy and Billy Gottlieb, was released in 2008. It contains 13 songs recorded by popular artists for the show.

== Broadcast and release ==
=== Episodes ===
Season	Episodes	Originally released	
Season	Episodes	First released	Last released
1	22	September 13, 2005	May 17, 2006
2	21	August 30, 2006	May 16, 2007
3	15	September 25, 2007	May 19, 2008
4	26	September 3, 2008	May 14, 2009
5	22	September 17, 2009	May 20, 2010
6	23	September 23, 2010	May 19, 2011
7	13	November 3, 2011	May 14, 2012
8	24	September 17, 2012	April 29, 2013
9	24	September 16, 2013	May 19, 2014
10	22	September 25, 2014	June 11, 2015
11	22	October 1, 2015	July 21, 2016
12	12	January 3, 2017	March 28, 2017

Almost every episode title alliteratively alludes to how the victim is discovered in said episode, like "The Prisoner in the Pipe" and "The Recluse in the Recliner", or to the main plot device of the episode, like "The Blackout in the Blizzard" and "The Verdict in the Story".

=== American ratings ===
In 2016, a New York Times study of the 50 TV shows with the most Facebook Likes found that Bones was "most popular in areas scattered around the West Coast, and tends to be less popular in places with large nonwhite populations".

Seasonal rankings (based on average total viewers per episode) of Bones.

Note: Each U.S. network television season starts in late September and ends in late May, which coincides with the completion of May sweeps.

Season	Episodes	Timeslot (ET)	Original airing			Rank	Viewers (in millions)
Season	Episodes	Timeslot (ET)	Season premiere	Season finale	TV season	Rank	Viewers (in millions)
1	22	Tuesday 8:00 pm (2005); Wednesday 8:00 pm (2006)	September 13, 2005	May 17, 2006	2005–06	#60	8.90
2	21	Wednesday 8:00 pm	August 30, 2006	May 16, 2007	2006–07	#50	9.40
3	15	Tuesday 8:00 pm (2007); Monday 8:00 pm (2008)	September 25, 2007	May 19, 2008	2007–08	#51	8.90
4	26	Wednesday 8:00 pm (2008); Thursday 8:00 pm (2009)	September 3, 2008	May 14, 2009	2008–09	#32	10.81
5	22	Thursday 8:00 pm	September 17, 2009	May 20, 2010	2009–10	#32	10.02
6	23	Thursday 8:00 pm (2010); Thursday 9:00 pm (2011)	September 23, 2010	May 19, 2011	2010–11	#29	11.57
7	13	Thursday 9:00 pm (2011); Monday 8:00 pm (2012)	November 3, 2011	May 14, 2012	2011–12	#48	9.26
8	24	Monday 8:00 pm	September 17, 2012	April 29, 2013	2012–13	#42	9.52
9	24	Monday 8:00 pm (September–November 2013; March–May 2014); Friday 8:00 pm (November 2013 – January 2014)	September 16, 2013	May 19, 2014	2013–14	#40	8.43
10	22	Thursday 8:00 pm	September 25, 2014	June 11, 2015	2014–15	#71	7.27
11	22	Thursday 8:00 pm	October 1, 2015	July 21, 2016	2015–16	#71	7.27
12	12	Tuesday 9:00 pm	January 3, 2017	March 28, 2017	2016–17	#78	5.54

The series premiere of Bones attracted an average of 10.8 million viewers with 6.7% household share and 11% household rating. Bones finished first among the 18-to-49-year-old demographic and in total viewers in its Tuesday 8:00 pm ET timeslot. New York described the show as "the best drama of the new network season" and a "sexed-up variation of all the CSIs". Regarding the show's procedural structure, Entertainment Weekly notes that Bones has a "pretty standard Crossing Jordan/CSI-style framework" but holds up because of the chemistry between the two lead characters; "that old Sam-and-Diane, Maddie-and-David, Mulder-and-Scully opposites-attract stuff never feels standard when it's done right."

Following the broadcast of the series' third episode, Fox ordered a full season of Bones. The network renewed it for a second season after a strong performance in ratings in the timeslot following American Idol and on its own without the American Idol's lead-in audience. Overall, the first season of Bones ranked 60th in viewership among prime-time shows and 53rd among the 18 to 49 year old demographic, with a seasonal average of 8.9 million viewers.

The second-season premiere attracted 8.61 million viewers in its Wednesday 8:00 pm timeslot, finishing second among the 18 to 49 years old demographic and first in total viewership with 6.7% household rating and 11% household share. As a lead-in for American Idol, the second-season finale of Bones obtained 10.88 million viewers with 3.5% household rating and 11% household share. It tied first in viewership among the 18 to 49 years old demographic with The Price Is Right Million Dollar Spectacular on CBS. In the 2006–07 television season, Bones improved its ranking to 50th place in viewership among prime-time shows with 9.4 million viewers and was ranked 51st among the 18 to 49 year old demographic. The show improved its ranking during its third season, placing 51st overall. However, its overall viewership was down from the previous season, averaging 8.9 million, the same as in the first season. Viewership began to steadily increase with its fourth season.

The ninth-season premiere attracted 7.8 million viewers and a 2.3 rating in the key 18–49 demographic during its Monday 8:00 pm timeslot. Its final Monday airing resulted in a 2.0 rating and 7.36 million viewers. Bones was subsequently moved to Fridays at 8:00 pm November 15, 2013, where ratings dropped 40 percent to a 1.2 and 5.85 million viewers in its initial airing in that timeslot.

=== Broadcast history ===
Bones premiered September 13, 2005, on the Fox network and was broadcast weekly in the Tuesday 8:00 pm ET timeslot before it moved to the Wednesday 8:00 pm ET timeslot in 2006. The first season finished May 17, 2006, with a total of 22 episodes.

The second season premiered on the Fox network August 30, 2006, and retained its Wednesday 8:00 pm ET timeslot. The second-season finale aired May 16, 2007, ending its second season with 21 episodes. One episode, "Player Under Pressure", was left unaired, which was originally scheduled to be broadcast as the second season's 19th episode but was pulled by the Fox network in the United States after the Virginia Tech massacre. The plot involved the discovery of the human remains of a college athlete and eventually aired April 21, 2008, as a part of the third season.

The third season premiered September 25, 2007, in its original premiere timeslot, Tuesday 8:00 pm ET. The show went on hiatus on November 27, 2007, because of the 2007–08 Writers Guild of America strike and returned on April 14, 2008, in the Monday 8:00 pm ET timeslot. The shortened third season finished May 19, 2008, with a total of 15 episodes.

The fourth season premiered September 3, 2008, on the Fox network in the Wednesday 8:00 pm ET timeslot with a two-hour episode that was filmed on location in London and Oxford, England. Originally scheduled to return from hiatus January 15, 2009, Bones instead resumed one week later because of preemption by President Bush's farewell address. As a result, two new episodes, "Double Trouble in the Panhandle" and "Fire in the Ice", were aired back-to-back January 22, 2009, airing in a new timeslot, Thursday 8:00 pm ET. The fourth-season finale aired May 14, 2009, with a total of 26 episodes.

The fifth season premiered September 17, 2009, on the Fox network and retained its Thursday 8:00 pm ET timeslot. It consisted of 22 episodes and ended May 20, 2010.

Off-network syndication of Bones began the week of January 28, 2008, on TNT.

March 29, 2012, announcing the renewal for an eighth season, Kevin Reilly, Fox's Chairman of Entertainment, said, "Over the past seven seasons, Hart Hanson, Stephen Nathan and the incredible Bones cast and crew have redefined the traditional crime procedural with an irreverent and adventurous sensibility, and I'm really happy to have this distinctive fan-favorite on our schedule for another season."

=== Online distribution ===
20th Century Fox Television released free episodes of Bones and several other primetime series online for viewing on Netflix, Hulu, and MySpace, which was owned by the same parent company, News Corporation, that owned 20th Century Fox Television (now a subsidiary of The Walt Disney Company). This began October 3, 2006, but access is restricted to United States residents only. Bones was available on their official website via Fox On Demand. In Canada, recent episodes were made available on the Global TV website. In the U.S. and Canada, the series was available on Netflix until 2017. All twelve seasons are also available on Amazon Prime.

In December 2025, Disney announced that Bones was among the television series to surpass one billion hours streamed on Disney+ in 2025.

== Spin-off series ==
=== The Finder ===
In October 2010, it was revealed that Fox was developing a potential spin-off series that would be built around a new recurring character that would be introduced in the sixth season. The potential spin-off series would also be created by Bones creator/executive producer Hart Hanson, and be based on The Locator series of two books written by Richard Greener. The character of Walter is described as an eccentric but amusing recluse in high demand for his ability to find anything. He is skeptical of everything—he experienced brain damage while overseas, which explains his constant paranoia and his being notorious for asking offensive, seemingly irrelevant questions to get to the truth. Production on the episode was scheduled to begin in December 2010, but was delayed to early 2011 due to creative differences.

Creator Hart Hanson posted on Twitter (humorously) regarding the notes he got from the network, "I received studio notes on the Bones spin-off idea. They want it to be better. Unreasonable taskmasters. Impossible dreamers. Neo-platonists." During Fox's TCA press tour, executive producer Stephen Nathan revealed production on the episode featuring The Finder began in February 2011, with the episode airing in April.

In the episode, Booth and Brennan travel to Key West, Florida, where the spin-off is said to take place. Nathan went on to say regarding the casting of character

You want to find people you want to see every single week do one unique character. That's why when you have Hugh Laurie, who is essentially playing a very unlikable character, you love to see him. And that is a rare, rare quality to find. And the finder won't be an unlikable character, but because it is a unique character, it's difficult to find just the right person.

Geoff Stults was cast as the lead character with Michael Clarke Duncan and Saffron Burrows cast as the other two lead characters. The three characters were introduced in episode 19 of the sixth season.

The Finder was picked up for the 2011–12 season May 10, 2011, with an order of 13 episodes. The series was canceled May 9, 2012, and aired its final episode two days later.

=== Bones: Skeleton Crew ===
A spin-off series consisting of 26 two-minute episodes, called Bones: Skeleton Crew, was produced by Fox and launched through a partnership with Sprint Nextel in conjunction with MasterCard's sponsorship. It was released to Sprint TV subscribers in November 2006 and released on the official website of Bones on December 4, 2006. The episodes do not feature the show's main cast; its plot revolves around three Jeffersonian Institute lab technicians who use their skills to solve a mystery. In 2025, after several years of being considered fully lost, three of its episodes were found on the Internet Archive.

== Reception ==
=== Critical response ===
Reviews for the pilot episode were mixed, and it holds a Metacritic score of 55 out of 100, based on 29 critical reviews. Subsequent episodes have received generally positive reviews.

USA Today comments that, compared to other crime shows, the show "is built on a more traditional and solid foundation: the strength of its characters", and "what sets Tuesday's Bones premiere apart from the procedural pack are stars Emily Deschanel and David Boreanaz, as the season's most appealing new crime fighters." On the other hand, Media Life Magazine said that while Bones has "an amazingly clever notion, brilliant even", its "execution doesn't match the conception" and, based on its first episode, the show "fails to evolve into a gripping series. In fact, it quickly becomes so derivative of so much else on television—especially, strangely, X-Files—that one might even call it bone-headed."

=== Accolades ===
Bones has received two Emmy nominations, for Outstanding Art Direction for a Single Camera Series for "The Hero in the Hold" at the 61st Primetime Emmy Awards and for Outstanding Special Visual Effects in a Supporting Role for "The Twist in the Twister" at the 64th Primetime Emmy Awards.

Emily Deschanel was nominated for a 2006 Satellite Award for Best Actress – Television Series Drama.

The series has also won two Genesis Awards for the episodes "The Woman in Limbo" and "The Tough Man in the Tender Chicken" for raising awareness on the issues of pig slaughtering and industrial chicken farms, while the episode "The Finger in the Nest" received a nomination.

Bones was nominated for two awards at the 37th People's Choice Awards, for Favorite TV Crime Drama and Emily Deschanel for Favorite TV Crime Fighter. The series received three nominations at the 38th People's Choice Awards, for Favorite TV Crime Drama, David Boreanaz for Favorite TV Drama Actor and Emily Deschanel for Favorite TV Drama Actress. The series received two nominations at the 42nd People's Choice Awards, for Favorite TV Crime Drama and Emily Deschanel for Favorite TV Crime Drama Actress.

Bones was nominated for a 2014 Prism Award for Best Drama Episode – Substance Abuse for the episode "The Friend in Need" and John Francis Daley for Best Performance in a Drama Series Episode.

== Other media ==
=== Books ===
Aside from the television broadcast of Bones, its characters and concepts have also been produced in print, on the Internet and in short videos for mobile phones. Currently, there are two print books related to the series, one a novel and the other an official guide.

- Buried Deep (also released as "Bones Buried Deep"; ISBN 978-1-4165-2461-8), written by Max Allan Collins, was published by Pocket Star February 28, 2006. The book is based on the characters in the television series rather than the characters created by Kathy Reichs, who had inspired the concept of Bones. Its plot focuses on Dr. Temperance Brennan and Special Agent Seeley Booth's investigation into the skeletal remains left on the steps of a federal building and its connection with a Chicago mob family. Angela, Hodgins and Zack only appear on the end of telephone conversations with Brennan.
- Bones: The Official Companion (ISBN 978-1-84576-539-2) is written by Paul Ruditis and published by Titan Books, released October 16, 2007. The book includes cast and crew interviews, episode guides and a background detail on real-life forensics.

=== Social and web media ===
Fox initially made extensive use of the internet to promote Bones. Prior to the broadcast of the second-season episode "The Glowing Bones in the Old Stone House", profiles of the characters involved in the episode were put up on their own MySpace web page. The blog entries of the characters were created to give insight into the potential suspects to be featured in the episode. In the episode, Brennan and her team uses clues from these web pages, which the viewers can also access.

Bonus content was posted by Fox on Bones' official site during the third season, which include short videos featuring Booth and Brennan waiting to see Dr. Sweets for couple's therapy.

=== Crossover with Sleepy Hollow ===
The eleventh season episode "The Resurrection in the Remains" contains a crossover with fellow Fox TV series Sleepy Hollow which concludes in Sleepy Hollow's third season episode "Dead Men Tell No Tales".

=== Mention in Lucifer ===
In Season 3, Episode 20, of Lucifer, Lucifer binge-watches all 12 seasons of Bones over the course of a week to stay awake. His love for the show is recalled in the final season when he plans to watch Bones with his future daughter, Rory Morningstar, as a bonding moment. Rory then informs her father about a show called More Bones, a spin-off of the series from her time.

=== Podcast ===
On June 28, 2023, Emily Deschanel and Carla Gallo announced a new podcast called Boneheads. The podcast features behind-the-scenes secrets and insights as Deschanel (Brennan) and Gallo (Daisy Wick) rewatch episodes of Bones. The first episode was to be released on July 19, 2023, but the due to the 2023 SAG-AFTRA strike, the launch of the podcast was delayed. On September 18, 2024, the Boneheads podcast released their first two episodes.

== Home media ==
The first three seasons, the ninth, tenth, eleventh and twelfth season were released on DVD format only, while seasons four through eight were also released on Blu-ray Disc format.

Season	Episodes			Release dates		
Season	Region 1	Region 2	Region 4	Region 1	Region 2	Region 4
Season 1	22	22	22	November 28, 2006	October 30, 2006	January 11, 2007
Season 2	21	21	21	September 11, 2007	October 15, 2007	December 3, 2008
Season 3	15	19	15	November 18, 2008	November 17, 2008	March 4, 2009
Season 4	26	22	26	October 6, 2009	October 26, 2009	October 27, 2009
Season 5	22	22	22	October 5, 2010	October 18, 2010	October 27, 2010
Season 6	23	23	23	October 11, 2011	October 17, 2011	November 9, 2011
Season 7	13	13	13	October 9, 2012	October 1, 2012	November 7, 2012
Season 8	24	24	24	October 8, 2013	September 30, 2013	November 20, 2013
Season 9	24	24	24	September 16, 2014	September 15, 2014	November 26, 2014
Season 10	22	22	22	September 29, 2015	October 12, 2015	November 11, 2015
Season 11	22	22	22	January 3, 2017	November 7, 2016	December 7, 2016
Season 12	12	12	12	June 13, 2017	June 19, 2017	June 14, 2017
The Complete Series	246	246	246	June 13, 2017	October 2, 2017	June 21, 2017

== Lawsuit ==
In a ruling made public in 2019, 21st Century Fox was found guilty of using Hollywood accounting practices to defraud the producers and stars of the series and was ordered to pay $179 million in missing profits.
