= Atlantic International Film Festival =

Canadian film festival

- Location: Halifax, Nova Scotia, Canada
- Founded: 1980
- Most recent: 2026
- Website: www.atlanticfilmfestival.ca

Current: 2026
- 2027 2025

The Atlantic International Film Festival (AIFF) is a Canadian international film festival held annually in Halifax, Nova Scotia since 1980. AIFF is the largest Canadian film festival east of Montreal, regularly premiering the region's top films of the year, while bringing the best films of the fall festival circuit to Atlantic Canada.

In 2017, the festival rebranded itself as the FIN Atlantic International Film Festival, with the FIN blending a dual reference to a fish's fins due to Halifax's connection to the ocean fisheries, and the conclusion of a film. In 2023, the festival dropped the "FIN", and returned to its previous branding as the Atlantic International Film Festival.

== Events ==
AIFF holds multiple events throughout the year. The Atlantic International Film Festival is an 8-day event, screening films from Canada and around the world, and showcasing Atlantic Canadian films and artists. During the first three days of the Festival, AIFF simultaneously runs AIFF Partners, an international co-production and co-financing market focusing on narrative feature film and series, which brings together producers and industry decision-makers from Canada and around the world. In the spring, AIFF holds AIFF Kids (formerly Viewfinders: Atlantic Film Festival for Youth), a touring event designed to engage, entertain, and educate young people. AIFF Outdoor (formerly Outdoor Film Experience) is AIFF's outdoor summer film series held in various locations across the Halifax Regional Municipality.

Although the festival screens films from across Canada and internationally, its principal awards program is reserved specifically for films from the Atlantic Canada region. It also does not generally bill most of its screenings as "galas", as many larger film festivals do; apart from the opening and closing films, the only other screenings to be billed as galas are the "Atlantic Canadian Gala", highlighting a film made within the region, and the "Reel Coast Shorts" gala, highlighting short films by Atlantic Canadian directors.

== Attendance ==
The 2005 festival experienced a 24 per cent attendance increase from the previous year with 29,400 in overall attendance, including 28 sold-out screenings and events. In 2007 attendance was up 18 per cent over 2006, with a record-setting 33,500 people taking part in the 27th annual event.

== Awards, premieres, and gala screenings ==
=== 2003 ===
The opening film was The Event, directed by Thom Fitzgerald.

=== 2004 ===
The opening film was Wilby Wonderful, directed by Daniel MacIvor.

=== 2005 ===
The opening film was 3 Needles, directed by Thom Fitzgerald, and Jason Eisener's short The Teeth Beneath premiered.

=== 2006 ===
The opening film was The Journals of Knud Rasmussen, directed by Zacharias Kunuk, and the closing film was Susanne Bier's After the Wedding.

=== 2007 ===
The opening film was Shake Hands With The Devil and The Bodybuilder and I was named best Canadian documentary.

=== 2008 ===
Down to the Dirt won Best Atlantic Feature and Jason Eisener received the award for Best Editing for his short film Treevenge.

=== 2009 ===
The opening film was Trailer Park Boys: Countdown to Liquor Day.

- Gordon Parsons Award for Best Canadian Feature: Cole — Carl Bessai
- Rex Tasker Documentary Award: Love and Cameras in America — Nathan Fielder
- Ed Higginson Cinematography Award: Four Feet Up — Christopher Ball
- Best Atlantic Short Film: Super Science — Joel MacKenzie
- Best Art Direction: Ghost Vase — Joel MacLeod and Adam Rafuse

=== 2010 ===
Films that were screened included Bruce McDonald's Trigger, Evan Kelly's debut feature The Corridor, and Paul Andrew Kimball's debut feature Eternal Kiss.

=== 2011 ===
Charlie Zone won Best Atlantic Feature and Best Director (Michael Melski) and Thom Fitzgerald's Cloudburst won the People's Choice Audience Award. A number of high-profile actors, including Brenda Fricker, Billy Boyd, Adam Sinclair, Kristin Kreuk and Famke Janssen, were in attendance. The opening film was Rollertown, the closing film was Mike Clattenburg's Afghan Luke, and the CBC Shorts Gala featured short films by Cory Bowles and Christian Sparkes.

=== 2012 ===
Blackbird was awarded Best Atlantic Feature and Best Director (Jason Buxton). This year's festival also featured the premieres of Roaming, the first film produced through Telefilm Canada's First Feature Program, The Disappeared, and Paul-Émile d'Entremont's documentary Last Chance.

=== 2013 ===
There Are Monsters was awarded Best Atlantic Feature and Best Director (Jay Dahl).

=== 2014 ===
- Gordon Parsons Award for Best Atlantic Canadian Feature: Cast No Shadow
- Best Atlantic Documentary: Bounty: Into the Hurricane — Edward Peill, Geoff D'Eon
- Best Atlantic Canadian Director: Christian Sparkes, Cast No Shadow
- Michael Weir Award for Best Atlantic Screenwriting: Joel Thomas Hynes, Cast No Shadow
- Best Atlantic Cinematographer: Scott McClellan, Cast No Shadow
- Joan Orenstein Award for Outstanding Performance by an Actress: Mary-Colin Chisholm, Cast No Shadow
- David Renton Award for Outstanding Performance by an Actor: Percy Hynes White, Cast No Shadow
- Best Atlantic Canadian Short Film: Transfer, Christopher Spencer-Lowe
- Best Atlantic Canadian Short Film, Honorable Mention: Ox, Ben Proudfoot
- Best Atlantic Canadian Animation: Suo Tower, Siloen Daley and Dylan Edwards
- Best Atlantic Canadian Score: Tanya Davis, Heartbeat
- Best Atlantic Canadian Sound Design: Eric Leclerc, The Toll
- First Feature Project: Your Money or Your Wife, Brittany Amos and Iain MacLeod
- Telefilm Canada Script Pitch: Seth A. Smith and Darcy Spidle, The Crescent

=== 2015 ===
- Gordon Parsons Award for Best Atlantic Canadian Feature: Across the Line — Director X
- Best Atlantic Documentary: Strange and Familiar: Architecture on Fogo Island — Katherine Knight, Marcia Connolly
- Best Atlantic Short Film: 4 Quarters — Ashley McKenzie
- Best Atlantic Short Documentary: The Weir: Fishing Fundy's Giant Tides — Jerry Lockett
- Best Atlantic Animation: Alien Love Story — Ron McDougall
- Best Atlantic Canadian Director: Stephen Dunn, Closet Monster
- Michael Weir Award for Best Atlantic Screenwriting: Stephen Dunn, Closet Monster
- Joan Orenstein Award for Outstanding Performance by an Actress: Meredith MacNeill, Your Money or Your Wife
- David Renton Award for Outstanding Performance by an Actor: Craig Brown, Your Money or Your Wife
- Best Atlantic Cinematographer: Marcia Connolly, Strange and Familiar: Architecture on Fogo Island
- Best Atlantic Original Score: Lukas Pearse and Mike Ritchie, North Mountain

=== 2016 ===
- People's Choice: Moonlight
- Gordon Parsons Award for Best Atlantic Canadian Feature: Maudie
- Best Atlantic Documentary: Perfume War – Michael Melski
- Best Atlantic Short Documentary: My Life So Far – Alan Collins
- Best Atlantic Short Film: Hustle & Heart - Koumbie
- Best Atlantic Animation: Rubbed the Wrong Way – Struan Sutherland
- Best Atlantic Canadian Director: Ashley McKenzie, Werewolf
- Michael Weir Award for Best Atlantic Screenwriting: Sherry White, Maudie
- Best Atlantic Cinematographer: Craig Norris, Kokota: The Islet of Hope
- Best Atlantic Editor: Brad Sayeau, We're From Here
- Best Atlantic Original Score or Song: Hillsburn, Hillsburn: A Band Becomes
- Joan Orenstein Award for Outstanding Performance by an Actress: Bhreagh MacNeil, Werewolf
- David Renton Award for Outstanding Performance by an Actor: Andrew Gillis, Werewolf
- Telefilm Canada Script Pitch: Mary Lewis, February

=== 2017 ===
- Gordon Parsons Award for Best Atlantic Canadian Feature: Black Cop — Cory Bowles
- Best Atlantic Documentary: In the Waves — Jacquelyn Mills
- Best Atlantic Short Film: Thug — Daniel Boos, Simon Mutabazi, Emmanuel John
- Best Atlantic Short Documentary: Invading Giants — Melani Wood, Kevin A. Fraser
- Best Atlantic Animation: Him — Lorna Kirk
- Best Atlantic Canadian Director: Cory Bowles, Black Cop
- Michael Weir Award for Best Atlantic Screenwriting: Darcy Spidle, The Crescent
- Best Atlantic Cinematographer: Guy Godfree, Suck It Up
- Best Atlantic Editor: Jacquelyn Mills and Steve Wadden, In the Waves
- Best Atlantic Original Score or Song: Seth A. Smith, The Crescent
- Joan Orenstein Award for Outstanding Performance by an Actress: Danika Vandersteen, The Crescent
- David Renton Award for Outstanding Performance by an Actor: Simon Mutabazi, Thug
- Telefilm Canada Script Pitch: Rebecca Babcock, Anew

=== 2018 ===
- Gordon Parsons Award for Best Atlantic Canadian Feature: An Audience of Chairs — Deanne Foley
- Best Atlantic Documentary: Shadow Men (Nos hommes dans l'ouest) — Renée Blanchar, Maryse Chapdelaine
- Best Atlantic Short Film: Duck Duck Goose — Shelley Thompson
- Best Atlantic Short Documentary: The Song and the Sorrow — Millefiore Clarkes
- Best Atlantic Animation: Billy's Behemoth Blast — Josh Owen
- Best Atlantic Canadian Director: Deanne Foley, An Audience of Chairs
- Michael Weir Award for Best Atlantic Screenwriting: Rosemary House, An Audience of Chairs
- Best Atlantic Cinematographer: Philippe Lavalette, Shadow Men (Nos hommes dans l'ouest)
- Best Atlantic Editing: Peter Giffen, Marie Wright and Meaghan Wright, The Social Shift
- Best Atlantic Original Score or Song: Duane Andrews, An Audience of Chairs
- Joan Orenstein Award for Outstanding Performance by an Actress: Shelley Thompson, Splinters
- David Renton Award for Outstanding Performance by an Actor: Taylor Olson, Hopeless Romantic
- Telefilm Canada Script Pitch: John Davie, The Lady Made of Light

=== 2019 ===
- Gordon Parsons Award for Best Atlantic Canadian Feature: Murmur - Heather Young, Martha Cooley
- Best Atlantic Documentary: Drag Kids - Megan Wennberg
- Best Atlantic Short Film: Little Grey Bubbles - Charles Wahl
- Best Atlantic Short Documentary: I Am Skylar - Rachel Bower
- Best Atlantic Canadian Director: Heather Young, Murmur
- Michael Weir Award for Best Atlantic Screenwriting: Heather Young, Murmur
- Best Atlantic Cinematographer: Jeff Wheaton, Murmur
- Best Atlantic Editing: Andrew MacCormack, Gun Killers
- Joan Orenstein Award for Outstanding Performance by an Actress: Sophia Bell, Sunnyside
- David Renton Award for Outstanding Performance by an Actor: Joel Thomas Hynes, Body & Bones

=== 2020 ===
- Gordon Parsons Award for Best Atlantic Canadian Feature: Bone Cage — Taylor Olson
- Best Atlantic Canadian Director: Taylor Olson, Bone Cage
- Best Atlantic Documentary: Bread in the Bones — Darrell Varga
- Best Atlantic Short Documentary: Queen of Chaos — Kaila Bolton
- Best Atlantic Short Film: Taylor Olson, Inceldom, or Why Are the Angry Men Angry
- Michael Weir Award for Best Atlantic Screenwriting: Taylor Olson, Bone Cage
- Best Atlantic Cinematographer: Kevin Fraser, Bone Cage
- RBC Script Development: It's the Fear That Keeps Me Awake — Scott Jones

=== 2021 ===
- Gordon Parsons Award for Best Atlantic Canadian Feature: Wildhood — Bretten Hannam
- Best Atlantic Canadian Director: Bretten Hannam, Wildhood
- Joan Orenstein & David Renton Award for Outstanding Performance in Acting: Avery Winters-Anthony, Wildhood
- Best Atlantic Documentary: The Silence (Le Silence) — Renée Blanchar
- Best Atlantic Short Documentary: Nalujuk Night — Jennie Williams
- Best Atlantic Short Film: Baduk — Induk Lee
- Michael Weir Award for Best Atlantic Screenwriting: Bretten Hannam, Wildhood
- Best Atlantic Cinematographer: Kevin A. Fraser, Tin Can
- Best Atlantic Editor: Mathieu Bélanger and Jonathan Keijser, Peace by Chocolate
- Best Atlantic Original Score: Seth A. Smith, Tin Can
- RBC Script Development: Justin O’Hanley, The Secret of the Ridgemoor Resort

=== 2022 ===
- Gordon Parsons Award for Best Atlantic Canadian Feature: Queens of the Qing Dynasty — Ashley McKenzie
- Best Atlantic Canadian Director: Ashley McKenzie, Queens of the Qing Dynasty
- Joan Orenstein & David Renton Award for Outstanding Performance in Acting: Andy Jones, Grown in Darkness and Sarah Walker, Queens of the Qing Dynasty
- Best Atlantic Documentary: Bernie Langille Wants to Know What Happened to Bernie Langille — Jackie Torrens
- Best Atlantic Short Documentary: Grandmothers — Millefiore Clarkes
- Best Atlantic Short Film: Coin Slot — Scott Jones
- Michael Weir Award for Best Atlantic Screenwriting: Taylor Olson and Koumbie, Bystanders
- Best Atlantic Cinematographer: Jeff Wheaton, The Year Long Boulder
- Best Atlantic Editor: Sarah Byrne, Bernie Langille Wants to Know What Happened to Bernie Langille
- Best Atlantic Original Score: Century Egg, Little Piece of Hair
- RBC Script Development: Nikki Martin, The Space Between

== AIFF Partners ==
AIFF Partners (formerly known as "Strategic Partners" and "FIN Partners") is an annual international film co-production market, held in Halifax, Nova Scotia, Canada. The event has been held annually since its inception in 1998, and is held simultaneously with the first three days of the Atlantic Film Festival. The 28th edition of the event will take place on September 10–13, 2025.

Every year, the AIFF Partners organizers accept a curated roster of delegates from around the world, in a bid to provide a 'one-stop shop' for film and TV producers and early-stage projects. Similar in format to International Film Festival Rotterdam's Cinemart, the European Film Market's co-production forum, and Independent Film Week's No Borders, AIFF Partners is Canada's premiere film and television co-production event. While the event attracts a strong core attendance from Canada, the US and the UK, it also focuses on an annual group of spotlight countries.

=== Spotlight countries ===
2024/2025: The 5 Nordics
2023/2024: New Zealand
2020/2021: Benelux, Germany, and the United States
2018/2019: United Kingdom, the Republic of Ireland, and the United States
2016/2017: Nordic countries and the United States
2014/2015: Latin America and the United States
2013: India and United Kingdom
2012: United States and the United Kingdom
2011: South Africa, United States and Australia
2009: Germany and Ireland
2008: Argentina, Brazil and Mexico
2007: France
2006: Australia, New Zealand and South Africa
2005: Germany
2004: Ireland
