= Queen of the Andes (film) =

2020 Canadian drama film

- Film poster
- Directed by: Jillian Acreman
- Written by: Jillian Acreman
- Produced by: Arianna Martinez
- Starring: Bhreagh MacNeil; Hailey Chown; Maggie Vaughan; Cassidy Ingersoll
- Cinematography: Jesse Anthony
- Edited by: Matthew Carr
- Production company: Little Bear Productions
- Release date: September 17, 2020 (AFF)
- Running time: 92 minutes
- Country: Canada
- Language: English

Queen of the Andes is a Canadian drama film, directed by Jillian Acreman and released in 2020. The film stars Bhreagh MacNeil as Pilar, a research scientist who has been selected by the Canadian government to participate in a crewed mission to colonize Mars, but is reluctant to leave her friends and family behind and tries desperately to find a way out of it; meanwhile, her girlfriend Arrow (Hailey Chown) is an activist who is campaigning against the proposed colonization of Mars.

The film premiered on September 17, 2020 at the Atlantic Film Festival.

Barry Hertz of The Globe and Mail reviewed the film favourably, writing that "One of the smartest moves Acreman makes is giving much of the screen over to MacNeil, who is as sympathetic here as she was startling in Ashley McKenzie's Werewolf back in 2016. Few of MacNeil's co-stars are able to match her presence, though, resulting in a half-professional, half-amateur state of actorly dissonance. Also spotty is the script, which solves some messy emotional puzzles with a disconcerting level of ease. But true to the name of the Telefilm program that's responsible for this project, Jillian Acreman is a talent to watch. Whether she decides to stay earthbound for her next project or grasp for an even higher stratosphere is up to her. Personally, I think she could go interstellar."
