= Catherine Banks =

Canadian playwright

- Occupation: playwright
- Writing career
- Period: 2000s–present
- Notable works: Bone Cage, It Is Solved By Walking

Catherine Banks is a Canadian playwright. She is a two-time winner of the Governor General's Award for English-language drama, in 2008 for Bone Cage and in 2012 for It Is Solved By Walking.

She resides in Sambro, Nova Scotia, a rural community within the Halifax Regional Municipality.

Her other plays have included Three Storey, Ocean View, Bitter Rose and Miss'n Me. Her latest project involves adapting Ernest Buckler's novel The Mountain and the Valley for the stage.

Banks has cited Michel Tremblay and María Irene Fornés as being among her literary inspirations.

Her play Bone Cage was adapted by actor and director Taylor Olson for the 2020 theatrical film Bone Cage.
