= Bone Cage =

2020 Canadian film directed by Taylor Olson

- Film poster
- Directed by: Taylor Olson
- Written by: Taylor Olson
- Based on: Bone Cage by Catherine Banks
- Produced by: Melani Wood
- Starring: Taylor Olson; Amy Groening; Christian Murray
- Cinematography: Kevin A. Fraser
- Edited by: Shawn Beckwith
- Music by: Terry Ahearn; James O'Toole
- Production companies: Afro Viking Pictures; Bone Cage Productions; Telefilm Canada; The Talent Fund
- Distributed by: Levelfilm
- Release date: September 17, 2020 (FIN)
- Running time: 89 minutes
- Country: Canada
- Language: English

Bone Cage is a 2020 Canadian drama film written and directed by Taylor Olson. Adapted from play of the same name by Catherine Banks, the film stars Olson as Jamie, a forestry worker whose ethical conflicts about participating in clearcutting, but having no options to leave the job, are beginning to affect his personal relationships, and Amy Groening as Chicky, his sister who has placed her own dreams of leaving town in search of something better on hold to stay and care for their ailing father Clarence (Christian Murray).

The film's cast also includes Ursula Calder as Jamie's fiancée Krista, Sam Vigneault as Jamie's best friend and Krista's brother Kevin, and David Rossetti as Chicky's married lover Reg, as well as Stephanie MacDonald, Reid Price, Sebastien Labelle, Ann-Marie Kerr, Bob Mann, Monte Murray, Jacob Sampson and Thom Payne.

The film premiered on September 17, 2020, at the FIN Atlantic Film Festival, where it won the awards for Best Atlantic Feature, Best Atlantic Director, Best Atlantic Screenplay and Best Atlantic Cinematography.

The film received two Canadian Screen Award nominations at the 9th Canadian Screen Awards in 2021, for Best Supporting Actress (Groening) and Best Adapted Screenplay (Olson).
