= Taylor Olson =

Canadian actor, director, and screenwriter (born 1993)

- Born: May 12, 1992 (age 34); Masset, British Columbia, Canada
- Occupations: Actor, Filmmaker
- Years active: 2014–present
- Known for: Bone Cage

Taylor Olson is a Canadian actor, writer and filmmaker from Halifax, Nova Scotia. He is best known as the director, writer and lead actor of the 2020 film Bone Cage, for which he was a Canadian Screen Award nominee for Best Adapted Screenplay at the 9th Canadian Screen Awards.

== Early life and education ==
Before moving to Halifax, Nova Scotia, Taylor Olson was born in Masset, British Columbia. Olson attended Dalhousie University's Fountain School of Performing Arts. He graduated in 2014, with a Bachelor of Arts with Honours in Theatre (Acting). While at the Fountain School, Olson was one of two recipients of the 2012 Andrew and David Stitt Memorial Prize.

== Career ==
Olson has appeared in over 70 films and television shows, and has had supporting or guest roles in the television series Pure, Sex & Violence, Mr. D, Diggstown, Trailer Park Boys, and This Hour Has 22 Minutes, as well as films including Black Cop, Hopeless Romantic, Spinster, Tin Can and Dawn, Her Dad and the Tractor, and the web series I Am Syd Stone.

He has also performed in stage roles in Halifax, including in a 2017 production of Catherine Banks's original theatrical version of Bone Cage, Neptune Theatre's world premiere of Controlled Damage, and Daniel MacIvor's solo play Monster, for which he was nominated for a Theatre Nova Scotia Robert Merritt Awards for Outstanding Lead Performance, 2020, as well as won Best Actor, Best Drama, EFT's Upstage Award and Best Solo Show at the Halifax Fringe Festival, 2019.

In 2022, Olson co-created, co-wrote, and directed the comedy series King & Pawn for BellFibeTV1. In 2023, the series was renewed for a second season. In 2023, Olson was cast in the comedy series O'Don's, also for FibeTV1. He plays Matt, one of the chefs at the titular Irish pub. The series premiered on January 15, 2024 with a five-episode first season. A second season was renewed, with production starting in January 2025.

His sophomore feature film Look at Me had its premiere at the 2024 Slamdance Film Festival.

His third feature film, What We Dreamed of Then, is slated to premiere at the 2025 Atlantic International Film Festival. In the same year he debuted the short-run TV1 comedy series Hey Halifax, Hello! Today!.

== Awards ==
Year	Award	Category	Film/play	Result
2017	ACTRA Maritime Awards	Outstanding Male Actor in a Leading Role	Hustle & Heart	Nominated
2017	ACTRA Maritime Awards	Outstanding Male Actor in a Leading Role	Ariyah & Tristan's Inevitable Break-Up	Nominated
2018	ACTRA Maritime Awards	Outstanding Male Actor in a Leading Role	Cut	Nominated
2019	ACTRA Maritime Awards	Outstanding Male Actor in a Supporting Role	Hopeless Romantic	Nominated
2020	ACTRA Maritime Awards	Outstanding Male Actor in a Leading Role	Masc	Nominated
2020	ACTRA Maritime Awards	Outstanding Male Actor in a Leading Role	You Too, Chuckles	Nominated
2020	ACTRA Maritime Awards	Outstanding Male Actor in a Leading Role	Bad Morning	Nominated
2021	ACTRA Maritime Awards	Outstanding Performance	Bone Cage	Won
2021	ACTRA Maritime Awards	Outstanding Performance	Inceldom	Nominated
2021	9th Canadian Screen Awards	Best Adapted Screenplay	Bone Cage	Nominated
2022	ACTRA Maritime Awards	Outstanding Performance	I Hate You	Nominated
2023	ACTRA Maritime Awards	Outstanding Performance	Bystanders	Won
2025	13th Canadian Screen Awards	Best Lead Performance in a Comedy Film	Look at Me	Nominated
2026	14th Canadian Screen Awards	Canadian Screen Award for Best Sketch Comedy Series & Ensemble Performance	Hey Halifax, Hello! Today!	Nominated
2026	14th Canadian Screen Awards	Canadian Screen Award for Best Direction, Variety or Sketch Comedy	Hey Halifax, Hello! Today!	Nominated
