= Ilkay Silk =

Ilkay Silk CC
- Born: 1947 (age 78–79); Nicosia, British Cyprus
- Education: Henrietta Barnett School; New College of Speech and Drama
- Children: Anna Silk
- Awards: Member of the Order of Canada

Ilkay Silk CC (born in 1948 in Nicosia, British Cyprus) is a Cypriot-born British and Canadian award-winning actress, playwright, producer, administrator, and educator. Between 1978 and 2014 she was the Director of Drama for St. Thomas University (STU), producing more than sixty plays. The Canadian Theatre Encyclopedia has compared Silk's contributions to theatre practice and education in New Brunswick to be a career which "parallels that of Toronto's Dora Mavor Moore and Calgary's Betty Mitchell".

Silk also co-founded the Theatre New Brunswick’s Young Company (1974); served as President of the New Brunswick Filmmakers' Co-operative (1983–1985); co-chaired the New Brunswick Arts Board (1990–1994); co-founded the Atlantic University and Community Theatre Festival (1997); was a founding director of the NotaBle Acts Theatre Festival (2001); chaired the TNB Board of Governors (2007–2012); and chaired the TNB Foundation (2012–present).

Having left an indelible mark on New Brunswick's cultural scene, in 2016 she was awarded Member of the Order of Canada for her contributions to arts and culture organizations in New Brunswick.

== Early life ==
Silk was born in Nicosia, Cyprus, to Turkish Cypriot parents in 1948. At the age of five she moved to London with her parents. Her earliest acting role was as the second king in a nativity play, and then at the age of eleven she was playing Hamlet in the annual Shakespeare production at her all-girls school. At the age of seventeen she attended a weeklong workshop at Oxford with the British Drama League. Silk's formal theatre education began at the New College of Speech and Drama, before graduating in 1969.

== Career ==
Upon graduating, Silk began teaching drama at The Henrietta Barnett Grammar School in London. The following year, she followed her husband, Peter Silk, to Fredericton, New Brunswick, so that he could pursue his post-doctoral work at the University of New Brunswick. They rented a basement apartment in Fredericton owned by Walter Learning. Silk auditioned for Theatre New Brunswick's (TNB) Christmas pantomime, directed by professor Ted Daigle, who later hired her to lead theatre at St. Thomas University.

Silk worked at TNB as an actor, technical assistant, and wardrobe mistress until she co-founded the TNB Young Company in 1974. She was then hired to a new staff position in 1978 at St. Thomas University as Drama Coordinator to direct plays for Theatre St. Thomas (TST) and to teach drama. Alongside Professor Russ Hunt and her colleague Michael Eagan, Silk was also instrumental in having STU's Black Box Theatre built in 1994. She was later hired as a fulltime staff member to run the university's theatre activity.

== Filmography ==
Film
| Year | Title | Role | Notes |
|---|---|---|---|
| 2021 | Queen of the Andes | Elswit | |

Television
| Year | Title | Role | Notes |
|---|---|---|---|
| 2006 | Canada Russia '72 | Ambassador Meagher | 2 episodes |

== Awards ==
- Excellence Award for Arts in Education from the province of New Brunswick (1999)
- The Playhouse Honours Award (2008)
- Member of the Order of Canada (2016)

== Personal life ==
Silk currently resides in Fredericton and in Los Angeles — where she lives with her daughter Anna Silk who is also an actress.
