= Amy Groening =

Canadian actress

- Occupation: Actress
- Years active: 2008–present
- Website: https://www.amygroening.com/

Amy Groening is a Canadian actress from Winnipeg, Manitoba. She is most noted for her performance as Chicky in the film Bone Cage, for which she received a Canadian Screen Award nomination for Best Supporting Actress at the 9th Canadian Screen Awards in 2021.

Her other film roles have included Spinster and Dawn, Her Dad and the Tractor.

== Filmography ==
=== Film ===
Year	Title	Role	Notes
2009	Customer Relations	Keira McAllister	
2011	Goon	Teenage Singer	
2011	Father's Day	Chelsea	
2014	Teen Lust	Cheryl	
2016	The Void	Dispatch	
2019	Halloween Party	Grace	
2019	Spinster	Bride	
2020	Bone Cage	Chicky	
2021	Dawn, Her Dad and the Tractor	Tammy	
2023	King of Killers	Karla Garan	
2024	To the Moon	Claire	

=== Television ===
Year	Title	Role	Notes
2012	Todd and the Book of Pure Evil	Lacey	Episode: "Deathday Cake"
2013	Horizon	Mabel Jones	Television film
2014	Reign	Charlotte	2 episodes
2015	Backpackers	Franny	5 episodes
2018	Mr. D	Marie	Episode: "Finnished Teaching"
2018	Frankie Drake Mysteries	Winnie Hudson	Episode: "Now You See Her"
2019	My One & Only	Lisa Grey	Television film
2020	The Secret Ingredient	Sara	Television film
2020	Project Christmas Wish	Joan	Television film
2021	Snowkissed	Jayne	Television film
2021	A House on Fire	Celeste Walker	Television film
2021	Missing and Alone	Ella	Television film
2021	'Tis the Season to be Merry	Darlene Walters	Television film
2022	We Wish You a Married Christmas	Kayla	Television film
2023	A Dash of Christmas	Sarah Blake	Television film
2023	The Santa Summit	Ava	Television film
2023	Miracle in Bethlehem, PA	Frankie	Television film
2024	'Twas the Date Before Christmas	Jessie	Television film
2026	Because of Cupid	Naomi	Television film
