= Tin Can (film) =

- Directed by: Seth A. Smith
- Written by: Seth A. Smith; Darcy Spidle
- Produced by: Nancy Urich
- Starring: Anna Hopkins; Michael Ironside
- Cinematography: Kevin Fraser
- Edited by: Seth A. Smith
- Music by: Seth A. Smith
- Production company: Cut Off Tail
- Distributed by: levelFilm
- Release date: October 8, 2020 (Sitges)
- Running time: 104 minutes
- Country: Canada
- Language: English

Tin Can is a 2020 Canadian science fiction horror film, directed by Seth A. Smith. The film stars Anna Hopkins as Fret, a parasitologist who is working on the cure to a fungal pandemic when she is abducted and imprisoned in a life suspension chamber by mysterious forces.

The cast also includes Simon Mutabazi, Amy Trefry, Michael Ironside, Shelley Thompson and Taylor Olson.

Smith has clarified that the film was shot prior to the COVID-19 pandemic.

The film premiered at the Sitges Film Festival in 2020, and had its North American premiere at the Fantasia Film Festival in August 2021. It was also screened at the 2021 FIN Atlantic Film Festival, where it won the awards for Best Score and Best Cinematography in an Atlantic Canadian film. It has been acquired for commercial distribution by levelFilm, with commercial release planned for 2022.

== Plot ==
Fret, a scientist researching a deadly contagious fungal disease in Canada, makes a breakthrough that could protect people from, or reverse the effects of, the disease. She tells a coworker while examining the results, and plans to leverage this new knowledge to enable humanity to fight back. When she later exits the lab, she is assaulted, knocked unconscious, and the face shield of her biohazard suit is broken. When she wakes, she finds herself sitting on a ledge inside a small hexagonal container with tubes coming out of various parts of her body.

As she struggles to free herself from the tubes, and slowly regains consciousness, she hears noises around her and pounds on the sides of the container. Initially, all she hears is a single voice of a man she knows who is in a similar container. As they communicate through the container walls, they start to hear other noises, eventually finding yet another person similarly situated. As different people wake up in their containers and interact with her, she slips back and forth between reality and memories from before her assault, allowing the audience to piece her life back together up to this point.

In chronological order: apparently, she was hired by a company called Vase as a slime mold researcher, and entered into a relationship with the head of the company, John, who eventually cheated on her. She takes some spore samples from victims and infects him in revenge. He asks a lady to assault and force her into a cryogenic preservation tube, and in return, reserves a place for her and her diseased son in cryogenic preservation tubes his company is building, hoping to be awakened when a cure is found. Other members of Vase also go into the cryogenic chamber to awaken when a cure is ready.

Likely, a cure is never found as Fret is put to cryogenic sleep, and awakens not knowing how long has passed. Outside her tube, she sees men (or machines, it's hard to tell at first), in gold-armored suits opening tubes and moving the occupants out of the room. Fret knocks over her tube and forces the bottom off and seemingly escapes the gold robot-machines, though it is unknown until later in the movie that she was actually turned into a gold robot-machine, replacing the one she attacked during her escape. While John is rescued from being destroyed by one of the robot-machines due to his infection by Fret (now as a robot-machine), she takes his body, covered in fungal growths, to the machine to have the growths removed (painfully), and transformed into a robot-machine himself.

== Cast ==
- Anna Hopkins: Fret/Gold
- Simon Mutabazi: John
- Michael Ironside: Wayne
- Amy Trefry: Darcy
- Chik White: Copper/Cobalt
- Sam Vigneault: Ellis/Copper
- Sara Campbell: Thumper
- Shelley Thompson: Newscaster/Vase
- Terrance Murray: Joseph
- Koumbie: Lab technician
- Taylor Olson: Lab technician
