= Andrew Gillis =

Canadian actor and musician

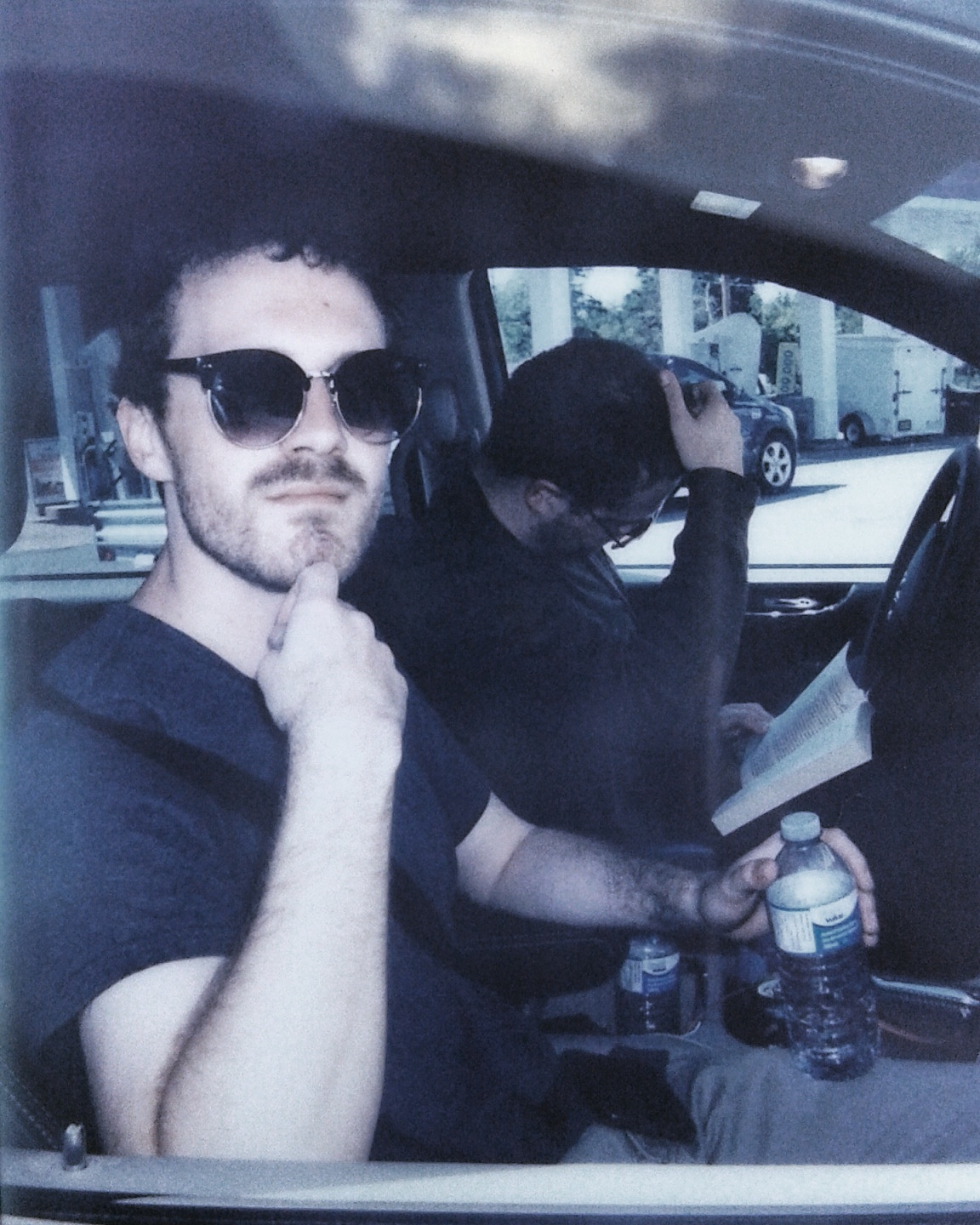
Actor Andrew Gillis on tour with Rebecca's Room.

Andrew Gillis is a Canadian actor and musician. He is most noted for his performance in the 2016 film Werewolf, for which he garnered a Canadian Screen Award nomination for Best Actor at the 5th Canadian Screen Awards. He also won the award for Best Actor at the 2016 Atlantic Film Festival, and was a nominee for Best Actor in a Canadian Film at the Vancouver Film Critics Circle Awards 2016.

From New Waterford, Nova Scotia, Gillis also performs as a musician with the band Rebecca's Room. He previously appeared in 4 Quarters, a short film by Werewolf director Ashley McKenzie, on which he was also credited as a cowriter. Gillis played a supporting role in Seth Smith's 2017 thriller The Crescent.
