= Toronto Film Critics Association Awards 2017 =

Annual Canadian film awards ceremony

21st Toronto Film Critics Association Awards
- Date: December 10, 2017

Highlights
- Best Picture: The Florida Project
- Most awards: The Florida Project, Get Out, Lady Bird (2)
- Most nominations: Lady Bird, Phantom Thread, Three Billboards Outside Ebbing, Missouri (4)

The 21st Toronto Film Critics Association Awards, honoring the best in film for 2017, were awarded on December 10, 2017.

== Winners ==
Category	Winners and nominees	Films
Best Film	Sean Baker	The Florida Project
Best Film	Paul Thomas Anderson	Phantom Thread
Best Film	Martin McDonagh	Three Billboards Outside Ebbing, Missouri
Best Canadian Film	Ashley McKenzie	Werewolf
Best Canadian Film	Kevan Funk	Hello Destroyer
Best Canadian Film	Joyce Wong	Wexford Plaza
Best Actor	Daniel Day-Lewis	Phantom Thread
Best Actor	Timothée Chalamet	Call Me by Your Name
Best Actor	Gary Oldman	Darkest Hour
Best Actress	Frances McDormand	Three Billboards Outside Ebbing, Missouri
Best Actress	Sally Hawkins	The Shape of Water
Best Actress	Saoirse Ronan	Lady Bird
Best Supporting Actor	Willem Dafoe	The Florida Project
Best Supporting Actor	Sam Rockwell	Three Billboards Outside Ebbing, Missouri
Best Supporting Actor	Michael Stuhlbarg	Call Me by Your Name
Best Supporting Actress	Laurie Metcalf	Lady Bird
Best Supporting Actress	Allison Janney	I, Tonya
Best Supporting Actress	Lesley Manville	Phantom Thread
Best Director	Greta Gerwig	Lady Bird
Best Director	Paul Thomas Anderson	Phantom Thread
Best Director	Jordan Peele	Get Out
Best Screenplay	Jordan Peele	Get Out
Best Screenplay	Greta Gerwig	Lady Bird
Best Screenplay	Martin McDonagh	Three Billboards Outside Ebbing, Missouri
Best First Feature	Jordan Peele	Get Out
Best First Feature	William Oldroyd	Lady Macbeth
Best First Feature	Ashley McKenzie	Werewolf
Best Animated Feature	Nora Twomey	The Breadwinner
Best Animated Feature	Lee Unkrich	Coco
Best Animated Feature	Ann Marie Fleming	Window Horses
Best Foreign-Language Film	Ruben Östlund	The Square
Best Foreign-Language Film	Agnès Varda and JR	Faces Places
Best Foreign-Language Film	Andrey Zvyagintsev	Loveless
Best Documentary Film	Agnès Varda and JR	Faces Places
Best Documentary Film	Brett Morgen	Jane
Best Documentary Film	Ceyda Torun	Kedi
