= King & Pawn =

Canadian comedic television series

- Genre: Sitcom; Comedy
- Created by: Taylor Olson; Tieren Hawkins
- Directed by: Taylor Olson
- Starring: Reid Price; Julia Williams; Shelley Thompson; Taylor Olson; Tieren Hawkins; Bob Mann; Koumbie; Tyrone Parsons
- Composer: Bob Mann
- Country of origin: Canada
- Original language: English
- No. of seasons: 3
- No. of episodes: 15

Production
- Executive producers: Mike Smith; Gary Howsam; Robb Wells; John Paul Tremblay
- Production location: Halifax, Nova Scotia
- Cinematography: Tim Mombourquette; Paul McCurdy
- Running time: 22 minutes
- Production company: Sleepy Bear Productions

Original release
- Network: Bell FibeTV1; Swearnet
- Release: 5 April 2022 – present

King & Pawn is a Canadian television series starring Reid Price. The series follows the misadventures of a loveable loser who inherits his estranged father's pawnshop and the quirky staff of screwballs who come with it.

On May 21, 2024, King & Pawn became available for streaming in Canada on Swearnet.com - "The Home of the Trailer Park Boys.

== Premise ==
King & Pawn follows a lovable loser, Rhett McManus (Reid Price) as he inherits his estranged father's pawnshop, becoming forced to contend with a screwball staff, an assortment of eccentric customers, and an ever-growing list of problems as he attempts to turn a profit.

== Cast ==
- Reid Price as Rhett McManus
- Julia Williams as Norma Jean
- Shelley Thompson as Maggie Rollins
- Taylor Olson as Holden Gunderson
- Tieren Hawkins as Allen
- Koumbie as Eliza Rollins (regular in seasons 1–2, recurring in season 3)
- Bob Mann as Mark Flaherty, Esq (guest in season 1, regular in seasons 2–3)
- Tyrone Parsons as Kurtis (regular in season 3)

== Notable guest stars ==
- Jonathan Torrens as George Pamplemousse (season 2, episode 3)

== Production ==
The series first season was released in Canada on April 5, 2022, exclusively to Bell Fibe TV customers on Bell FibeTV1.

In 2023, the series was renewed for a second season.

In 2024, co-creators Taylor Olson and Tieren Hawkins received a nomination for Outstanding Achievement in Screenwriting at the 2024 Screen Nova Scotia Awards Gala.

== Episodes ==
No. overall	No. in season	Title	Directed by	Written by	Original release date
1	1	"What the Frack?"	Taylor Olson	Tieren Hawkins; Taylor Olson	5 April 2022
After being left his estranged father's pawnshop, Rhett McManus is met head-on by chaos and thrown into the midst of a decades-old rivalry against competitor Maggie Rollins. A need for quick cash takes a special scheme to solve.
2	2	"Too Hot to Haggle"	Taylor Olson	Tieren Hawkins; Taylor Olson	5 April 2022
In an attempt to refill the stores' shelves, Rhett heads to the storage locker auctions - ending up in a bidding war with Maggie and Eliza. A blood-thirsty loan shark informs Norma Jean of an outstanding lien.
3	3	"The Fun Never Ends"	Taylor Olson	Tieren Hawkins; Taylor Olson	5 April 2022
On the day Norma Jean finally hits the jackpot, a surprise guest from Rhett's past brings the King and Pawn an influx of increasingly violent visitors and an unwanted police presence.
4	4	"Father, Son, & Holy Heck"	Taylor Olson	Tieren Hawkins; Taylor Olson	5 April 2022
With all fires under control, Rhett seizes the opportunity to go on a romantic double date with Holden and Allen closely in tow. A chance reintroduction leads to Maggie and Xan becoming unlikely allies against the King and Pawn.
5	5	"Just Roll With It"	Taylor Olson	Tieren Hawkins; Taylor Olson	5 April 2022
With the crew locked out of the King and Pawn, Eliza takes Norma Jean, Allen, and Holden into the lion's den in a daring heist to drum up much-needed bail money.

=== Season 2 (2023) ===
No. overall	No. in season	Title	Directed by	Written by	Original release date
6	1	"The Wrong Arm of the Law"	Taylor Olson	Tieren Hawkins; Taylor Olson	13 March 2023
A surprise subpoena pressures Rhett, leading him to seek assistance from the only lawyer he knows.
7	2	"Now, That's a Family!"	Taylor Olson	Taylor Olson; Bob Mann	20 March 2023
Rhett's attempt at a romantic display inadvertently leads King and Pawn into a "dangerous" situation with wannabe-robbers.
8	3	"Therapy at the Prawn Shop"	Taylor Olson	Taylor Olson; Bob Mann	27 March 2023
In an effort to escape the trial, Rhett hires a therapist to interview and evaluate the King and Pawn staff.
9	4	"You Can't Handle the Truth"	Taylor Olson	Taylor Olson; Bob Mann	3 April 2023
Mark guides Rhett, Eliza, and the King and Pawn staff in facing Maggie for their day in court.
