= Lowlife (2012 film) =

- Directed by: Seth A. Smith
- Written by: Seth A. Smith; Darcy Spidle
- Produced by: Nancy Urich
- Starring: Chik White; Kate Hartigan; Mitchell Wiebe
- Edited by: Seth A. Smith
- Music by: Seth A. Smith
- Production company: Cut/Off/Tail Pictures
- Release date: September 23, 2012
- Running time: 99 minutes
- Country: Canada
- Language: English

Lowlife is a 2012 Canadian psychological horror film directed by Seth A. Smith. It was first shown at the 2012 Fantasia International Film Festival, then the Atlantic Film Festival where it won the audience award for best feature. In November 2012, the filmmakers organized a DIY Canada-wide theatrical release in 25 cities reaching every province and territory, screening in independent theaters and alternative venues.

== Cast ==
- Chik White as Asa
- Kate Hartigan as Elle
- Mitchell Wiebe as Damon
- John Urich as Dog
- KC Spidle as Boss
- Paul Hammond as Tommy Gods
- William Simmons as The Transient

== Filming ==
The film was shot in the coastal forests surrounding Halifax, Nova Scotia. Shooting took place in the spring of 2011. Lowlife was Seth Smith's first feature film.

== Reception ==
Vice's Noisey named it "the feel bad hit of 2012" after the release of the trailer. In a review, Film Bizarro said, "It's a really well-crafted movie that manages to be equally terrifying, disgusting, confusing, humorous and highly inspirational to watch." Writer Stephen Cooke compared watching it to "being visually dragged through the mud." Best Horror movies said "It’s a weird, experimental feature that could very well draw a cult following" or "could conceivably disappear just as easily".

== Release ==
The film was released on home video and VOD in August 2014 on BRINKvision.
