= Jackie Torrens =

Canadian actress

Jackie Torrens is a Canadian actress, writer and filmmaker based in Halifax, Nova Scotia. She was born in Charlottetown, Prince Edward Island.

== Acting ==
She began her career as an actress, most notably being cast as the frumpy but shrewd office manager Wanda Mattice in the television series Made in Canada in 1998. Along with the rest of the show's core ensemble, she is a three-time Gemini Award winner for Ensemble Performance in a Comedy Program or Series, winning at the 16th Gemini Awards in 2001, the 17th Gemini Awards in 2002, and the 19th Gemini Awards in 2004. They were also nominated, but did not win, at the 18th Gemini Awards in 2003, and Torrens was individually a Canadian Comedy Award nominee for Best Performance by a Female, Television at the 3rd Canadian Comedy Awards in 2002.

In 2013, she was cast as social worker Drucie Mackay in the television series Sex & Violence, for which she was nominated for Best Actress in a Continuing Leading Dramatic Role at the 3rd Canadian Screen Awards in 2015.

She has also won an award from the Nova Scotia chapter of the ACTRA Awards for her performance in the film Across the Line, and was nominated for both Sex & Violence and the film Heartbeat.

== Writing ==
Her stage plays have included Live! Nude! Animal!, Five Fables, Strange Antiques, That Is My Heart and Georama.

She has received several Robert Merritt Award nominations both as a playwright and as a stage actress.

== Filmmaking ==
In 2014, she released the documentary film Edge of East. With Jessica Brown, she is a partner in Peep Media, and has also released the documentary films My Week on Welfare, Small Town Show Biz: 2 Dreams from a Harbourtown, Radical Age and Bernie Langille Wants to Know What Happened to Bernie Langille.

Bernie Langille won the award for Best Atlantic Documentary at the 2022 FIN Atlantic Film Festival.

== Filmography ==
=== Film ===
- Marion Bridge (2002)
- The Wild Dogs (2002)
- Heartbeat (2014)
- Across the Line (2015)

=== Television ===
- Made in Canada (1998–2003)
- Sex & Violence (2013–2017)
