= Queens of the Qing Dynasty =

2022 Canadian film

- Film poster
- Directed by: Ashley McKenzie
- Written by: Ashley McKenzie
- Produced by: Britt Kerr; Nelson McDonald; Ashley McKenzie
- Starring: Sarah Walker; Ziyin Zheng
- Cinematography: Scott Moore
- Edited by: Ashley McKenzie; Scott Moore
- Music by: Cecile Believe; Yu Su
- Animation by: Cyril W. Chen
- Production company: Hi-Vis Film
- Distributed by: Medium Density Fibreboard Films (MDFF) (Canada); Factory 25 (United States)
- Release dates: February 15, 2022 (Berlinale); March 3, 2023 (Canada); May 5, 2023 (United States)
- Running time: 122 minutes
- Country: Canada
- Language: English

Queens of the Qing Dynasty is a Canadian experimental drama film written, directed, and co-produced by Ashley McKenzie. It premiered on February 15, 2022, as a part of the Encounters program at the 72nd Berlin International Film Festival, and had its North American premiere in the Wavelengths program of the 2022 Toronto International Film Festival. The film was later released in Canada by Medium Density Fibreboard Films (MDFF) on March 3, 2023, and by Factory 25 in the United States on May 5.

== Plot ==
The film follows Star, a troubled teenager who has been hospitalized following a suicide attempt, and An, a genderqueer volunteer at the hospital whose companionship and friendship helps Star to feel less isolated as they bond over their shared uncertainties about their futures.

== Cast ==
- Sarah Walker as Star
- Ziyin Zheng as An
- Wendy Wishart as Gail
- Jana Reddick as social worker
- Yao Xue as Violet
- Cherlena “Sassi” Brake as Cher
- Reg MacDonald as charge nurse
- Carl Getto as psychiatrist
- Nidhin KH as boyfriend
- Rony Robson as OR nurse

== Production ==
At the time of production, both Sarah Walker and Ziyin Zheng were first-time film actors; Walker had previously studied dance and was classically trained as a soprano, and Zheng had experience in theater. Walker's character, Star, was based on a teenager who auditioned for a role in McKenzie's prior film Werewolf, but was, according to McKenzie, ultimately unable to act in front of a camera. However, McKenzie later became an advocate for the teenager as she struggled to find support within the Canadian healthcare system, and subsequently became fascinated with her speech patterns. To prepare for the role of Star, Walker spent time with this teenager, who had by then befriended McKenzie. According to McKenzie, the teenager has seen the film and compared the viewing experience to an "acid trip".

McKenzie also built Ziyin Zheng's character, An, around their own personality, having met Zheng after they became neighbors during the production of Werewolf. McKenzie has said that Zheng expressed a desire to play a "sassy bitch" in one of her films, which she then incorporated into the drafts of Queens of the Qing Dynasty. Additionally, McKenzie hired a script consultant to better speak to the character's experiences as a Chinese-Canadian immigrant.

McKenzie has stated that her foremost points of inspiration while crafting the film didn't revolve around specific directors, but rather individual on-screen performances, such as those in the Mike Leigh films Career Girls and Secrets and Lies, as well as Gena Rowlands's lead performance in the John Cassavetes film Love Streams, and Anna Faris's performance in the Gregg Araki stoner comedy Smiley Face.

Queens of the Qing Dynasty was shot entirely on location in Cape Breton, Nova Scotia.

== Release ==
Queens of the Qing Dynasty saw its world premiere on February 15, 2022 at the 72nd Berlin International Film Festival in the Encounters section, a competitive subcategory for experimental works. The subsequently appeared in the Wavelengths Program of the 47th Toronto International Film Festival (TIFF) for its North American premiere. The film was acquired for Canadian distribution by Medium Density Fibreboard Films (MDFF) in September 2022, and received international distribution by Factory 25 in early 2023. Queens of the Qing Dynasty was released in Toronto theaters on March 3, 2023, and in New York theaters on May 5. Mubi released the film on its streaming platform on November 15, a double bill with McKenzie's previous film Werewolf.

== Reception ==
On review aggregator website Rotten Tomatoes, Queens of the Qing Dynasty currently holds an approval rating of 88% based on 17 reviews. On Metacritic, the film holds a score of 78 out of 100 based on 8 reviews, indicating "generally favorable" reception.

Writing for The New York Times, Beatrice Loayza described the film as "wonderfully bizarre" and praised Sarah Walker's lead performance, stating, "Walker, captivatingly raw, makes Star both charming and frustrating in her aloofness." In a review published in The Playlist after the film's TIFF premiere, Mark Asch also lauded Walker's performance, stating, "McKenzie and cinematographer Scott Moore’s scrutiny of naturalistic and amateur performers keeps this from being a sentimental film. Sarah Walker is great in an unself-conscious way, foggily conveying Star’s blinking on-off struggle to bridge the gap between her inner monologue and the outer world. She speaks in a thick voice that sounds effortful and takes in the world with watchful, silent eyes. It’s the rare performance that’s magnetic in its passivity."

Giving the film three out of five stars for The Guardian, Cath Clarke's review was more mixed, ultimately concluding, "Some might be bored or alienated by the lack of action – the camera often seems to arrive in the aftermath of an event. I found its mood hypnotic but unsettling, like having my nerves rubbed up the wrong way." Similarly, B. Panther wrote for Paste magazine, "[A] script playing in subtlety, disaffection and emotional distance, coupled with this abstract score, can sometimes make the film feel like it isn’t going anywhere during its two hours. We are with these characters for a brief but intense time in their lives. The changes these characters go through are so internal, so minute, that they’re difficult to register. It sometimes feels like we’re stuck in a scene study, uncertain if we’re supposed to be building to something bigger."

== Awards ==
The film was shortlisted for the Directors Guild of Canada's 2022 Jean-Marc Vallée DGC Discovery Award. It won three awards at the 2022 FIN Atlantic Film Festival, for Best Atlantic Feature, Best Atlantic Director and the Joan Orenstein & David Renton Award for Outstanding Performance in Acting (Walker). It was nominated for a Canadian Screen Award for Achievement in Costume Design.
