= Ernest Buckler =

Canadian writer (1908–1984)

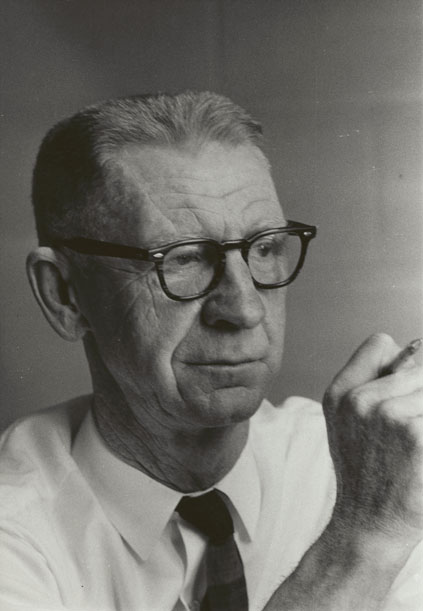
- Born: 19 July 1908; West Dalhousie, Nova Scotia
- Died: 4 March 1984 (aged 75); Bridgetown, Nova Scotia
- Writing career
- Notable works: The Mountain and the Valley

Ernest Buckler OC (19 July 1908 – 4 March 1984) was a Canadian novelist and short story writer best known for his 1952 novel, The Mountain and the Valley and the short story The first born Son. "Since its publication in 1954, Ernest Buckler's story of David Canaan's life in the Annapolis Valley, The Mountain and the Valley, has gradually established itself as a touchstone of Canadian Modernism. Its continuing presence in Canadian Literature courses and its effect on such writers as Margaret Laurence and Alice Munro attest to its power as a novel exploring imaginative experience." (Van Rys 1995)

Buckler was born in the village of West Dalhousie, Nova Scotia, where he attended a one-room schoolhouse. He was a scholarship student at Dalhousie University (B.A., 1929), and a philosophy student at the University of Toronto (M.A., 1930). After graduation, he stayed in Toronto, working as an actuary, until 1936, when he returned to rural Nova Scotia, eventually settling on a farm in Centrelea near Bridgetown.

In 1967, he was awarded the Canadian Centennial Medal and in 1974, he was made an Officer of the Order of Canada.

In 1978, he was awarded the Leacock Medal for Whirligig.

== Bibliography ==
=== Novels ===
- The Mountain and the Valley. New York City: Henry Holt, 1952.
- The Cruelest Month, 1963.

=== Other works ===
- Ox Bells and Fireflies: A Memoir. Toronto: McClelland and Stewart, 1968; New York: Knopf, 1968.
- Nova Scotia: Window on the Sea. Toronto: McClelland and Stewart, 1973.
- The Rebellion of Young David and Other Stories. Toronto: McClelland and Stewart, 1975.
- Whirligig. Toronto: McClelland and Stewart, 1977.
- The Harness
- The Locket
- Penny in the Dust, 1927.
- The Clumsy One
- The Bars and the Bridge
- Long, Long After School
