= North/South =

Canadian television series

- Created by: Floyd Kane
- Starring: David Patrick Flemming; David Alexander Miller; Loretta Yu; Peter Williams; Debra McCabe
- Country of origin: Canada
- No. of seasons: 1
- No. of episodes: 6

Production
- Production companies: Halifax Film Company (Note: As North South Productions Incorporated); Inner City Films

Original release
- Network: CBC Television
- Release: July 4 – July 13, 2006

North/South is a Canadian soap opera created by Floyd Kane and produced by the Halifax Film Company and Inner City Films, featuring Cory Bowles. The show ran for one season, airing on CBC Television between July 4 and July 13, 2006.
