= Seth A. Smith =

Canadian artist, filmmaker and musician

Seth A Smith (born 1977) is a Canadian artist, filmmaker and musician from Halifax, Nova Scotia. He is the frontman for Dog Day and director of feature films The Crescent and Lowlife.

== Film ==
After directing a number of shorts and music videos, Smith shifted focus to film. In 2012, he completed his first feature, Lowlife, which Vice named "The feel bad hit of 2012." The film won the Audience Award at The Atlantic Film Festival and went on to receive a 20-city crowd source theatrical release in Canada. His second feature, The Crescent, premiered at the Toronto International Film Festival in 2017 and won a number of awards and honourable mentions at various other festivals. Smith was nominated for the Directors Guild of Canada's DGC Discovery Award.

His third feature film, Tin Can, premiered at the Sitges Film Festival in 2020, and his fourth, Permanent Damage, premiered in 2026 at the 30th Fantasia International Film Festival.

== Music ==
Along with Nancy Urich, KC Spidle, and Meg Yoshida, Smith is a member of Dog Day band. They produce material at their home studio, Fundog Recordings. Smith's other recording projects include film soundtracks, solo recordings, and a collaboration with indie musician Chad VanGaalen.

== Visual art ==
A substantial part of Smith's visual art practice has been in design and screenprinting with Yorodeo and collaboration with artist Paul Hammond.
