= Bernie Langille Wants to Know What Happened to Bernie Langille =

- Directed by: Jackie Torrens
- Written by: Jackie Torrens
- Produced by: Jessica Brown
- Starring: Bernie Langille
- Cinematography: Kevin Fraser
- Edited by: Sarah Byrne
- Production company: Peep Media
- Release date: April 30, 2022 (Hot Docs)
- Running time: 78 minutes
- Country: Canada
- Language: English

Bernie Langille Wants to Know What Happened to Bernie Langille is a Canadian documentary film, directed by Jackie Torrens and released in 2022. The film follows Bernie Langille, a man who is investigating the 1968 death of his namesake grandfather at CFB Gagetown under mysterious circumstances.

The story is told through a mixture of contemporary footage of the younger Bernie talking about his investigations, old family movies of the older Bernie, and miniature figurine reenactments of the various theories about the death. The film is an expansion of a shorter documentary film Torrens released in 2018.

The film premiered on April 30, 2022, at the Hot Docs Canadian International Documentary Festival. It was subsequently screened at the 2022 FIN Atlantic Film Festival, where it won the awards for Best Atlantic Documentary and Best Atlantic Editor (Sarah Byrne).
