= Stanleyville (film) =

2021 Canadian dark comedy film

- Theatrical release poster
- Directed by: Maxwell McCabe-Lokos
- Screenplay by: Rob Benvie; Maxwell McCabe-Lokos
- Produced by: Hayley Brown
- Starring: Susanne Wuest; Cara Ricketts; Christian Serritiello; George Tchortov; Adam Brown; Julian Richings
- Cinematography: Cabot McNenly
- Edited by: Duff Smith; Graham Tucker
- Music by: Joseph Shabason
- Production companies: Anthropoid, Ontario Inc.; Scythia Films; Memory International
- Distributed by: Oscilloscope; Yellow Veil Pictures
- Release dates: August 15, 2021 (Fantasia); April 22, 2022 (Canada)
- Running time: 88 minutes
- Country: Canada
- Language: English

Stanleyville is a 2021 Canadian dark comedy film directed by Maxwell McCabe-Lokos (in his directorial debut) from a screenplay he co-wrote with Rob Benvie. It stars Susanne Wuest, Cara Ricketts, Christian Serritiello, George Tchortov, Adam Brown, and Julian Richings. The film premiered at the Fantasia International Film Festival on August 15, 2021, and was released in theaters on April 22, 2022. It received generally positive reviews from critics.

== Premise ==
Maria Barbizan, Bofill Pancreas, Andrew Frisbee Jr., Felicie Arkady, and Manny Jumpcannon are five strangers participating in an eight-round competition for an orange SUV. Maria is a married mother of one. She decided to step away from her dull life after she saw a hawk fly into her office window. The invitation to the competition from a strange gentleman named Homunculus gave her a sense of purpose, believing that she was specifically selected to compete. In the first game, the players are asked to blow and pop as many balloons as they can. While Andrew lies about his score to win the round, Maria admits that she was unable to blow and pop a single balloon. The second game is on cognitive sequencing. Felicie wins the round, though some players, including Maria, struggle to complete it.

The third round is a two-hour challenge to write a motivational anthem. Homunculus locks them in the room, and Maria demands the other players stay, fearing the risk of disqualification. Maria notices a quote by explorer Henry Morton Stanley, which reads, "Granted that I know little of my real self, still, I am the best evidence for myself." She performs the quote in the form of a hum when Homunculus returns. Manny hurts his finger for an injury point, but he does not receive it, and the third point is given to Andrew. The next round asks for the creation of a telecommunications device in less than fourteen hours. Felicie wins the point by simply presenting Andrew's phone as her device. Homunculus says the fifth round is to give him someone else's ear lobe. Manny mishears the task and cuts off his own. Bofill cuts off Manny's other ear lobe and wins the point.

In the sixth game, the players see who can hold their breath the longest. Manny wins the point but he holds his breath for too long and dies. Everyone agrees to move forward in the competition. Maria is saddened at the realization that they were randomly selected. Bofill consumes an excessive amount of protein shakes. Homunculus explains the rules of the seventh round: The players have 60 seconds to extinguish a candle flame. If they fail, everybody will be killed. While Felicie and Andrew argue, Maria turns the flame off with her finger and wins the point. Bofill dies minutes before the final round begins. Homunculus uses Maria's functioning telecommunications device to summon someone on the other end. The voice reveals the last game's name, "Andrew Frisbee Loser". An irritated Andrew kills Homunculus and Maria takes over as host. She makes up the new eighth game, in which the first person to get a hat will win. Andrew stabs Felicie with a sword to get the hat but Felicie shoots and kills him. Felicie takes the keys to the prized SUV and leaves. Maria stays behind to unlock an emergency exit door in the room, which leads to the outdoors. Maria sees a hawk flying in the air and frowns.

== Cast ==
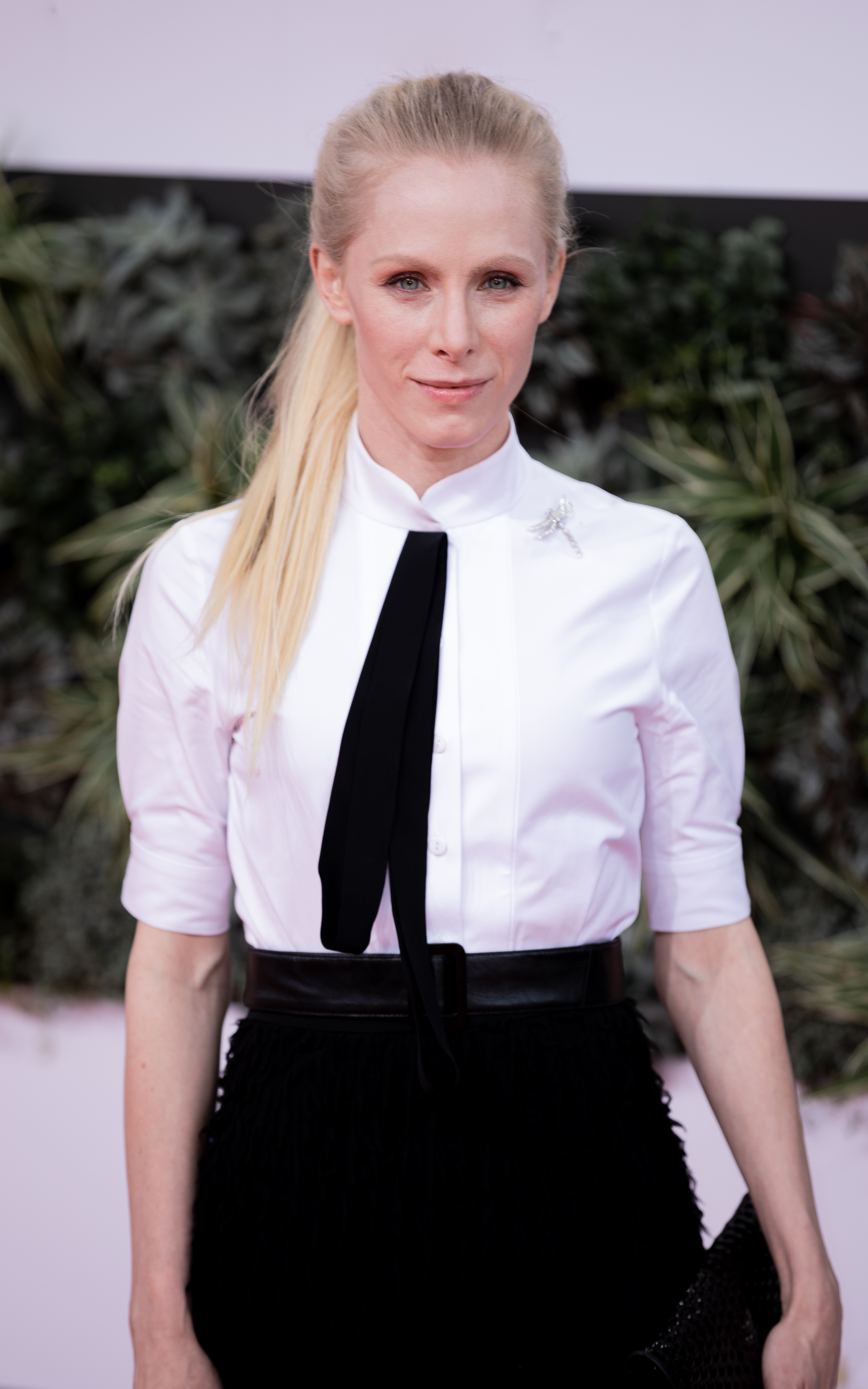
The lead character, Maria, is played by Susanne Wuest

- Susanne Wuest as Maria Barbizan
- Cara Ricketts as Felicie Arkady
- Christian Serritiello as Andrew Frisbee Jr.
- George Tchortov as Bofill Pancreas
- Adam Brown as Manny Jumpcannon
- Julian Richings as Homunculus

== Production ==
In June 2018, Telefilm Canada announced it would help finance the film. The cast was revealed in July 2019. Principal photography took place in Hamilton, Canada, while exterior shots were filmed in Berlin, Germany. Production was scheduled to conclude on August 8, 2019.

== Release ==
The film premiered at the Fantasia International Film Festival on August 15, 2021. It was released in theaters on April 22, 2022, by Oscilloscope.

== Reception ==
On the review aggregator website Rotten Tomatoes, 65% of 31 reviews are positive, with an average rating of 6.5/10. The website's critical consensus reads, "Stanleyville may not have much substance beneath its beguilingly weird surface, but this off-kilter concoction has a certain quirky charm." Metacritic, which uses a weighted average, assigned a score of 51 out of 100 based on eight critics, indicating "mixed or average reviews".

Barry Hertz of The Globe and Mail wrote that "It’s Squid Game meets Big Brother. Or maybe it’s the Stanford Prison Experiment meets Cube. Or perhaps it is just what happens when you give a few hundred thousand dollars to a filmmaker with a very specific, very cult-film-moulded sensibility, and step the hell back."
