= Dawn, Her Dad and the Tractor =

2021 Canadian drama film

- Poster
- Directed by: Shelley Thompson
- Written by: Shelley Thompson
- Produced by: Terry Greenlaw; Shelley Thompson
- Starring: Maya Henry; Robb Wells; Amy Groening; Reid Price
- Cinematography: Kevin A. Fraser; Frank Adam Novak
- Edited by: Amy Mielke
- Music by: Scott Macmillan
- Production companies: Picture Plant; Rusty Tractor
- Release date: May 27, 2021 (Inside Out)
- Running time: 90 minutes
- Country: Canada
- Language: English

Dawn, Her Dad and the Tractor is a 2021 Canadian drama film, directed by Shelley Thompson. The film stars Maya Henry as Dawn MacGinnis, a young transgender woman from Nova Scotia who returns home for her mother's funeral, and tries to rebuild her relationship with her estranged father John Andrew (Robb Wells) through working together to restore John Andrew's old broken-down tractor.

The film's cast also includes Amy Groening, Reid Price, Richie Wilcox, Francine Deschepper and Taylor Olson.

The film was shot in various locations in Nova Scotia, including Windsor, Chester, Halifax and Antigonish, in 2020.

The film premiered on May 27, 2021, at the Inside Out Film and Video Festival.

It received five nominations for the Screen Nova Scotia awards in 2022, including Best Feature Film, WIFT Best Nova Scotia Director (Thompson) and ACTRA Award Outstanding Performance nominations for Francine Deschepper, Reid Price and Robb Wells.
