= Floyd Kane =

Canadian film director, screenwriter, producer

- Born: East Preston, Nova Scotia, Canada
- Occupations: Film director; Screenwriter; Producer

Floyd Kane is a Canadian film and television director, screenwriter, and producer. He is best known as the creator of Diggstown, the CBC series filmed in Atlantic Canada.

== Early life and education ==
Floyd Kane was born in East Preston, a predominantly Black community in the Canadian province of Nova Scotia. He pursued an English degree at St. Mary's University in Halifax before enrolling at Dalhousie Law School.

== Career ==
Kane graduated law school and commenced his legal career articling with Blake, Cassels & Graydon in Toronto. He was admitted to the Ontario Bar in 1998.

From 1999 to 2003, Kane secured a position as in-house legal counsel at Salter Street Films, a movie and television production company based in Atlantic Canada. As a media lawyer and production executive, he worked on notable productions such as This Hour Has 22 Minutes and the Bowling For Columbine documentary. While practicing law within the film industry, Kane also pursued his passion for writing screenplays.

In 2004, he joined Halifax Film Company as the Vice President of Creative and Business Affairs. In 2006, Kane created North/South, a Canadian soap opera produced by the Halifax-based production company that aired on CBC Television. Set in Halifax, the show centers on four contrasting families involved in the city's construction industry. During the same year, the Halifax Film Company eventually transformed into DHX Media, where Kane continued as a VP until 2010.

In 2010, he started his own independent company, Freddie Films Inc., producing projects such as the 2015 film Across the Line, a screenplay he wrote.

In 2018, he created the CBC original drama, Diggstown, which was the first Canadian legal drama television series to feature a Black Canadian woman as its lead character.
