= Rhonda's Party =

2010 Canadian short film directed by Ashley McKenzie

- Directed by: Ashley McKenzie
- Written by: Christine Comeau
- Produced by: Nelson MacDonald
- Starring: Marguerite McNeil; Karine Vanasse
- Cinematography: Becky Parsons
- Edited by: Thorben Bieger
- Release date: 2010
- Running time: 8 minutes
- Country: Canada
- Language: English

Rhonda's Party is a Canadian short drama film, written and directed by Ashley McKenzie and released in 2010. The film stars Marguerite McNeil as Rhonda, a reclusive elderly woman living in a nursing home who has been planning a 100th birthday party for her closest friend in the home, and Karine Vanasse as Amy, a nurse who has been left with the task of informing Rhonda that the other woman has died the night before the party.

== Awards ==
The film won CBC Television's Short Film Face-Off in 2011, and was named to the Toronto International Film Festival's annual year-end Canada's Top Ten list.

McNeil won an ACTRA Award for Outstanding Performance, Female from the Nova Scotia chapter of ACTRA for her performance. The film won the award for Best Cinematography at the 2011 Air Canada enRoute Film Festival.

In 2013, McKenzie won the A&E Short Filmmakers Award and the Shaw Media Fearless Female Director Award at the National Screen Institute's Online Short Film Festival.
