= Do I Know You from Somewhere? =

- Directed by: Arianna Martinez
- Screenplay by: Arianna Martinez; Gordon Mihan
- Produced by: Gordon Mihan; Lance Kenneth Blakney
- Starring: Caroline Bell; Ian Ottis Goff; Mallory Amirault
- Cinematography: Lance Kenneth Blakney
- Edited by: Gordon Mihan; Lance Kenneth Blakney
- Music by: Zachary Greer
- Production company: Strike Pictures
- Distributed by: Vortex Media
- Release date: September 6, 2024 (TIFF)
- Running time: 79 minutes
- Country: Canada
- Language: English

Do I Know You from Somewhere? is a Canadian drama film directed by Arianna Martinez, and released in 2024. Described as a multiverse story told without special effects, the film stars Caroline Bell as Olive, a woman who has been in a relationship with Benny (Ian Ottis Goff) for a number of years since they first met at a mutual friend's wedding, only for her reality to begin shifting until one day Benny has been fully replaced by Ada (Mallory Amirault), a woman Olive does not recognize even though they've been in a relationship for a number of years since they first met at the same wedding.

The cast also includes Gillian Salmon, Hailey James Trifts, Dani Brun, Megan Murphy, Sophie Brander, Jean-Michel Cliche, Bhreagh MacNeil, Alex Rioux, Gordon Mihan and Sydney Hallet in supporting roles.

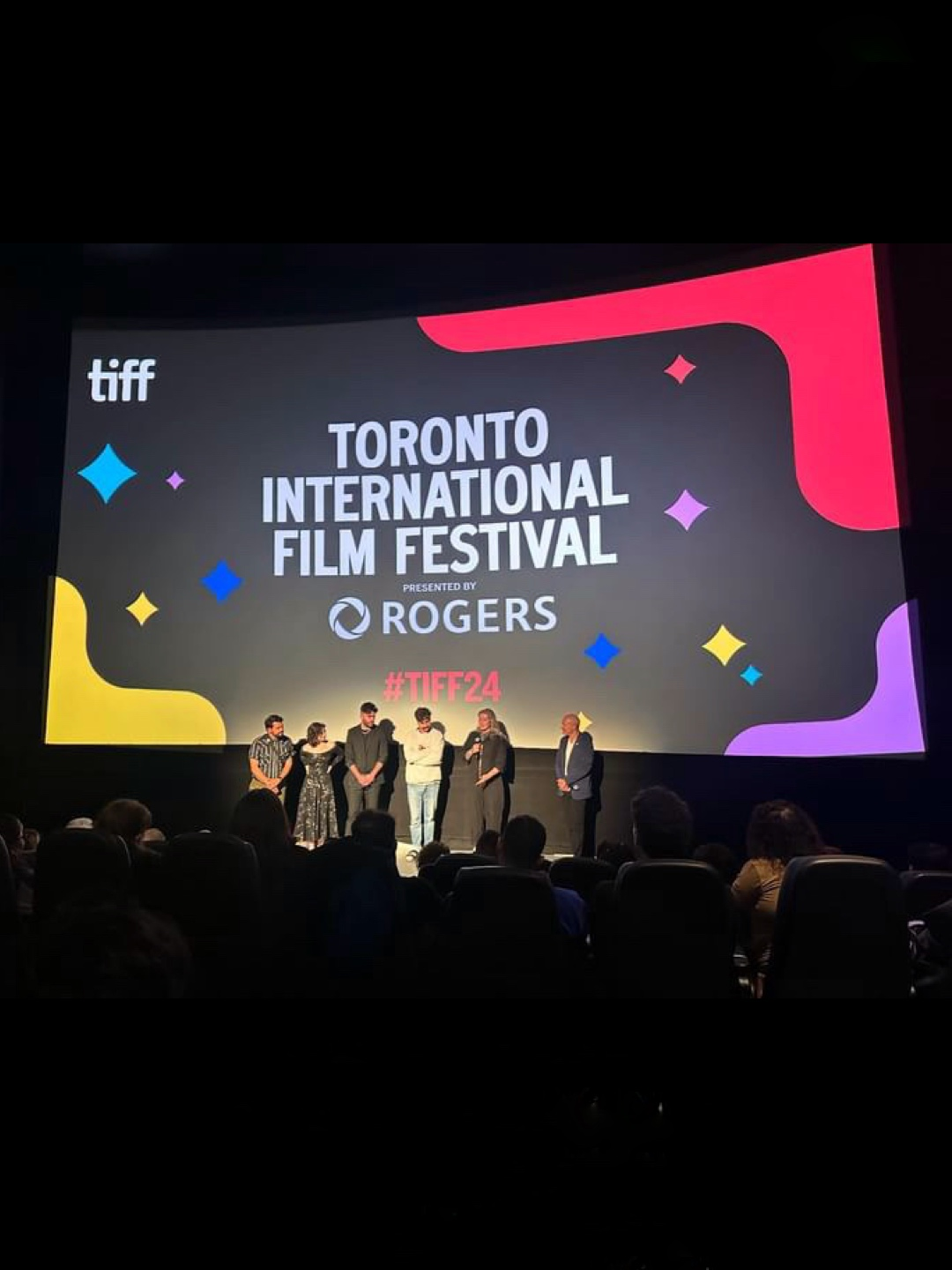
The team behind "Do I Know You From Somewhere?" introduces the film for the TIFF World Premiere at the Scotiabank Theatre in 2024.

Martinez's feature directorial debut, the film was shot in 2023 in various locations throughout New Brunswick.

The film premiered in the Discovery program at the 2024 Toronto International Film Festival, and was also screened at the 2024 Atlantic International Film Festival. It had its International Premiere at the 29th Busan International Film Festival as part of the Flash Forward section.
