= Bhreagh MacNeil =

Canadian actress

Bhreagh MacNeil is a Canadian actress. She is most noted for her performance in the 2016 film Werewolf, for which she garnered a Canadian Screen Award nomination for Best Actress at the 5th Canadian Screen Awards. She also won the award for Best Actress in a Canadian Film at the Vancouver Film Critics Circle Awards 2016, and at the 2016 Atlantic Film Festival.

Originally from Big Pond, Nova Scotia, she studied theatre at Memorial University of Newfoundland's Grenfell Campus.

She starred in the 2020 film Queen of the Andes, and had a supporting role in Do I Know You from Somewhere? in 2024.
