= Susanne Wuest =

Austrian actress (born 1979)

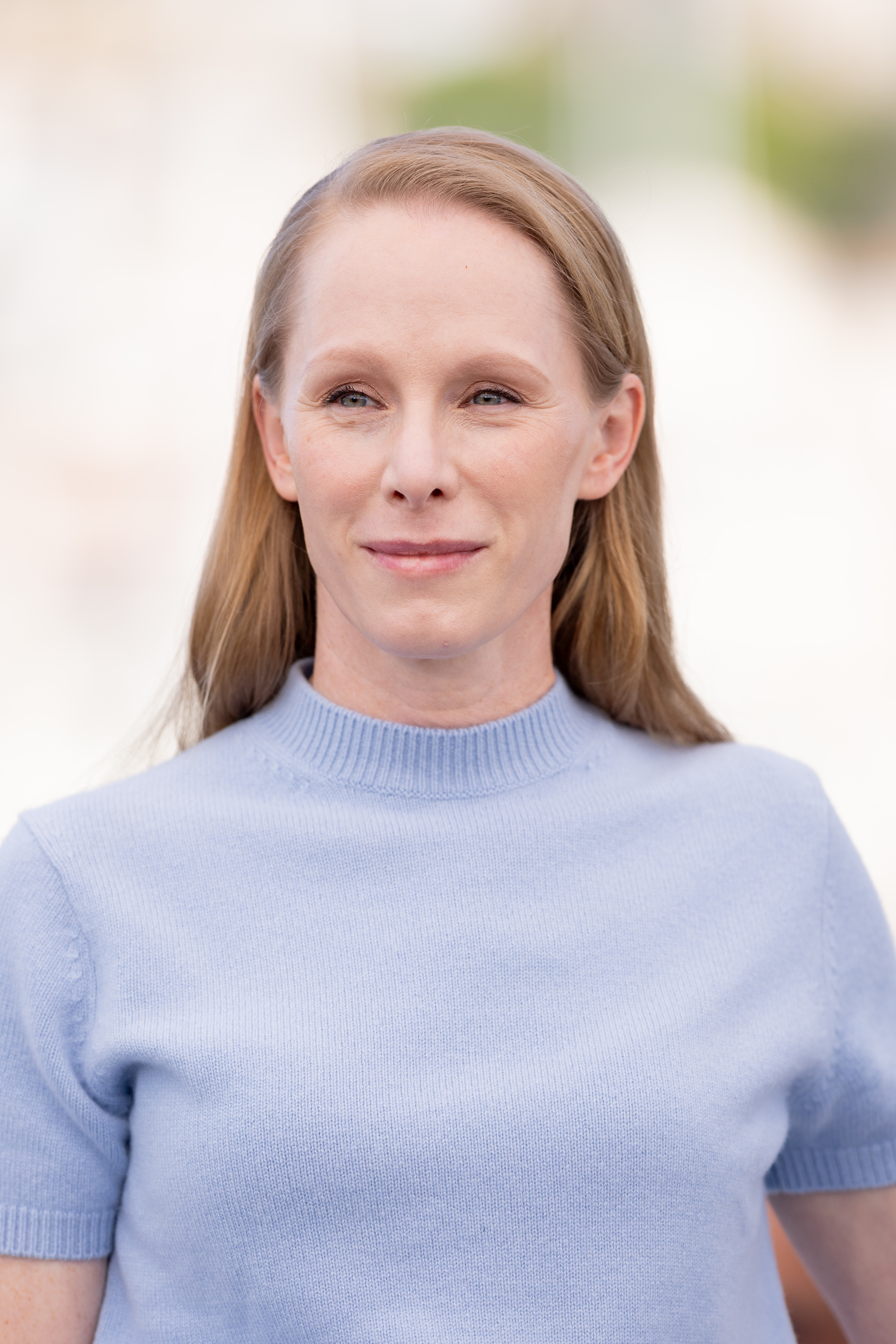
- Wuest in 2025
- Born: Susanne Elisabeth Wuest; 26 September 1979 (age 46); Vienna, Austria
- Occupation: Actress
- Years active: 1995–present

Susanne Elisabeth Wuest (born 26 September 1979) is an Austrian actress.

== Career ==
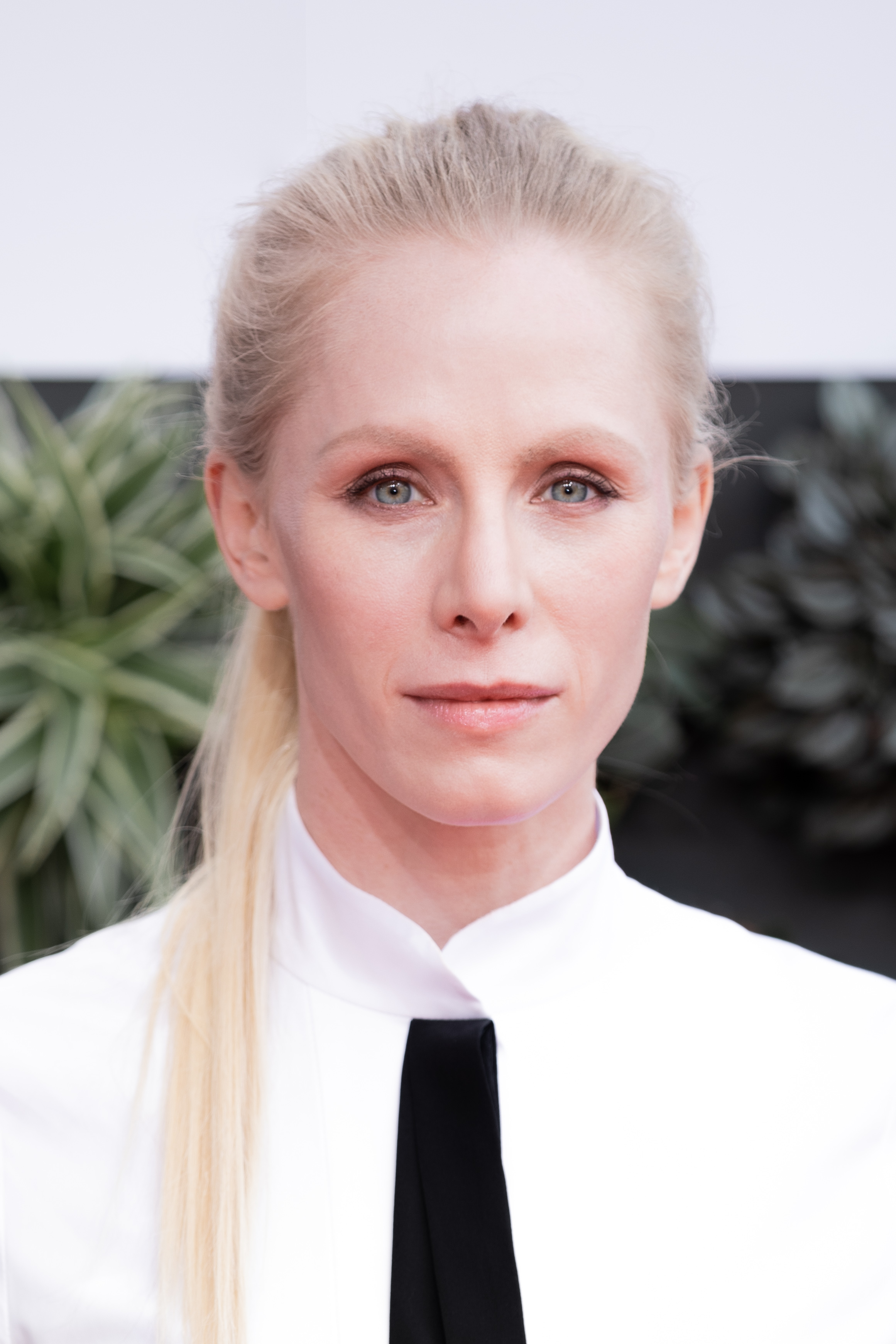
Susanne Wuest, 2019

Initially a piano enthusiast as a child, Wuest has since carved out a career in film. She appeared as the vampire Lisa in the web-series, Judas Goat for the Edinburgh film company, Seventh Crow. It was a 5 part mini-series that then went on to win several Scottish film awards. Her leading roles in films include Antares and Goodnight Mommy.

== Films ==
- 1995: Replay (Freispiel) – dir. Harald Sicheritz
- 2002: Der Wald – dir. Martin Semlitsch
- 2002: Mein Russland – dir. Barbara Gräftner
- 2003: Donau, Duna, Dunaj, Dunav, Dunarea – dir. Goran Rebic
- 2004: Antares – dir. Götz Spielmann
- 2006: Toast – dir. Jessica Hausner
- 2006: Die Geschworene – dir. Nikolaus Leytner
- 2007: Soko Wien/Donau – dir. Erhard Riedlsperger
- 2008: Trapped in Perfection – dir. Michel Katz
- 2009: Thank You, Mr. President – dir. Lenn Kudrjawizki
- 2009: Deutschland 09 – dir. Wolfgang Becker
- 2009: The Secret Society of Fine Arts – dir. Anders Ronnow Klarlund
- 2009: Pepperminta – dir. Pipilotti Rist
- 2010: Mörderschwestern – dir. Peter Kern
- 2010: Max Schmeling – dir. Uwe Boll
- 2010: Carlos – Der Schakal – dir. Olivier Assayas
- 2010: Panta Rhei – dir. Kristin Franke
- 2010: La Lisière – Am Waldrand – dir. Géraldine Bajard
- 2011: The Hatch – dir. Mike Ahern
- 2011: Molly und Mops – Ein Mops kommt selten allein – dir. Michael Karen
- 2012: Schnell ermittelt – dir. Andreas Kopriva
- 2013: Tatort: Zwischen den Fronten – dir. Harald Sicheritz
- 2013: Paul Kemp – Alles kein Problem – Schwarz auf Weiß – dir. Sabine Derflinger
- 2014: Judas Goat – dir. Pavel Szczepaniak
- 2014: Schwarzer Zucker – dir. Kristin Franke
- 2014: Goodnight Mommy – dir. Veronika Franz and Severin Fiala
- 2014: Der Kriminalist – Treu bis in den Tod
- 2015: The Shaman (2015) (Short Film) - Soul of the Colossus
- 2015: Nacht der Angst
- 2015: Reiff für die Insel – Katharina und der große Schatz (TV series episode)
- 2016: SOKO Kitzbühel – Amour Fou
- 2016: Das Geheimnis der Hebamme – dir. Roland Suso Richter
- 2016: A Cure for Wellness
- 2016: Das Sacher – dir. Robert Dornhelm
- 2017: Auf der anderen Seite ist das Gras viel grüner
- 2017: Tatort: Stau
- 2017: Iceman
- 2017: Mademoiselle Paradis
- 2017: Der Tod und das Mädchen – Van Leeuwens dritter Fall
- 2018: My Brother's Name Is Robert and He Is an Idiot
- 2018: Sunset
- 2018: Perfume (Parfum)
- 2018: Lore – Hinterkaifeck
- 2019: Südpol
- 2020: 18% Grey
- 2020: Spides (8 Folgen)
- 2021: Gefangen
- 2021: SOKO Stuttgart: Der tote Graf
- 2021: Stanleyville
- 2022: Der Bergdoktor – Kalte Stille
- 2022: We Might As Well Be Dead (Wir könnten genauso gut tot sein) – dir. Natalia Sinelnikova
- 2022: High Spirits (2-part TV-film)
- 2023: Tatort: Aus dem Dunkel
- 2023: Dear Darkness
- 2024: Inedia
- 2024: I'll play Mother
- 2024: Pauline
