= Across the Line (2015 film) =

- Film poster
- Directed by: Director X
- Written by: Floyd Kane
- Produced by: Elizabeth Guilford; Floyd Kane; Michael Donovan; Mark Gosine; Amos Adetuyi
- Starring: Stephan James; Sarah Jeffery; Steven Love; Lanette Ware; Jeremiah Sparks; Shamier Anderson; Denis Theriault; Simon-Paul Mutuyimana; Jim Codrington; Jackie Torrens; Cara Ricketts
- Cinematography: Sami Inayeh
- Edited by: Dev Singh
- Music by: Menalon
- Production companies: Freddie Films; Circle Blue Media; DHX Media
- Distributed by: A71 Pictures; Entertainment One
- Release date: September 19, 2015 (Atlantic)
- Running time: 97 minutes
- Country: Canada
- Language: English

Across the Line is a 2015 Canadian drama film directed by Director X (in his feature film directorial debut). The film stars Stephan James and Sarah Jeffery. It is set in Nova Scotia, where it was shot.

== Background ==
The film's storyline was inspired by the 1989 Cole Harbour District High School race riots.

== Plot ==
The film is set in North Preston, Nova Scotia where Mattie (Stephan James), a black hockey player, is being considered for a professional career. However, his hopes are threatened by growing racial strife at his school while his brother Carter (Shamier Anderson) is involved in criminal activity. Mattie also has a romantic interest in Jayme (Sarah Jeffery), who already has a white boyfriend.

== Cast ==
- Stephan James as Mattie Slaughter - Hockey prospect
- Sarah Jeffery as Jayme Crawley - John's girlfriend
- Steven Love as John - Jayme's boyfriend
- Lanette Ware as Velma Slaughter - Mother
- Jeremiah Sparks as Ancel Slaughter - Father
- Shamier Anderson as Carter Slaughter - Older brother
- Denis Theriault as Todd
- Simon-Paul Mutuyimana as Dwight
- Jim Codrington as Fraser Crawley - Father policeman
- Jackie Torrens as Shelley Doucette
- Cara Ricketts as Lori Downey

== Production ==
The film was originally titled Undone. The film was produced by Floyd Kane, Michael Donovan, Mark Gosine and Amos Adetuyi and was written by Kane, a native of East Preston, NS. Kane attended Cole Harbour High School when a race riot erupted at the school in 1989.

== Release ==
The first screening of Across the Line was September 19, 2015 at the Atlantic Film Festival where it won the award for Best Atlantic Feature. The film opened in limited release in British Columbia and Ontario on April 8, 2016, with screenings in various Canadian cities throughout that month.

== Reception ==
On the review aggregator website Rotten Tomatoes, 83% of 6 critics' reviews are positive. The National Post assessed the film at 2.5/4 stars, noting the story's unwavering focus on racial themes was "to the detriment of the film's depth and realism" but noted that video producer Director X "makes the transition to feature film-making look easy".

In 2017, the film was the subject of an episode of The Filmmakers, the Canadian Broadcasting Corporation's web talk series on Canadian film.
