= Cara Ricketts =

Canadian film, stage and television actor

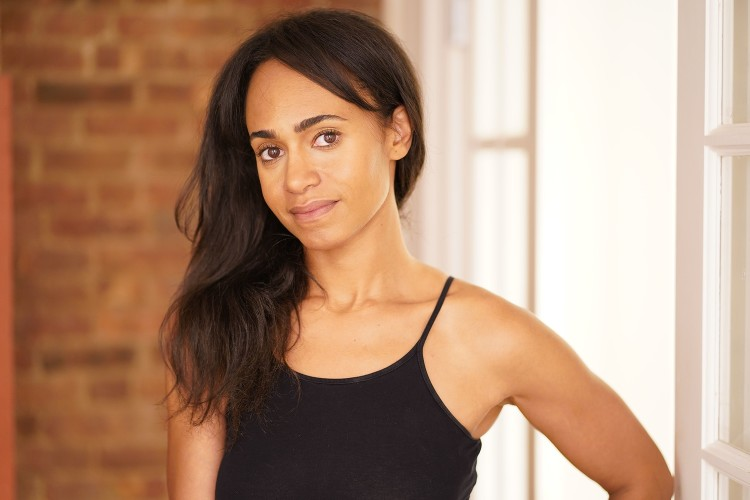
- Education: Canadian Film Centre; Stratford Festival; Humber College
- Occupation: Actress
- Years active: 2005–present

Cara Ricketts is a Canadian actress, best known for her roles as Mary Lacroix in Anne with an E and Lilly Rue in the 2019 revival of Street Legal.

== Life ==
Born and raised in Toronto, Ontario, Canada she is an alumna of the Canadian Film Centre's Actors Conservatory, the Stratford Festival's Birmingham Conservatory and the theatre program at Humber College.

She first became known as a stage actress, appearing in 2005 productions of Joseph Jomo Pierre's Born Ready and Stephen Adly Guirgis's The Last Days of Judas Iscariot. Her later stage roles included Titania in A Midsummer Night's Dream, Beneatha in A Raisin in the Sun, Portia in the Stratford Festival production of Julius Caesar, Queenie in The Wild Party Ruth in Harold Pinter's The Homecoming, and Hedda in Henrik Ibsen's Hedda Gabler She received a Dora Mavor Moore Award nomination for Best Leading Actress (Musical Theatre) in 2016 for The Wild Party, and won The 2020 ACTRA Award for her performance as Mary Lacroix in Anne with an E

Her film roles have included Across the Line, Jean of the Joneses and Stanleyville. On television, she has had supporting or guest roles in Orphan Black, Titans, The Resident, Whatever, Linda, The Book of Negroes and Revenge of the Black Best Friend.

She won an ACTRA Award for Outstanding Performance, Female from the Toronto chapter of ACTRA in 2020 for Anne with an E.

== Filmography ==
=== Television ===
| Year | Title | Role | Notes |
|---|---|---|---|
| 2007 | The Gathering | Raelle Tucker | TV Mini Series |
| 2008 | The Tower | Chelle Jenkins | TV Movie |
| 2008 | Air Crash Investigation | Cydya Smith | Episode: "Behind Closed Doors" |
| 2010 | As You Like It | Celia | TV Short |
| 2013 | Murdoch Mysteries | Rosina Denman | Episode: "Murdoch of the Living Dead" |
| 2013 | Saving Hope | Allison Davis | Episode: "All Things Must Pass" |
| 2013 | Satisfaction | Pretty Paramedic | Episode: "The Blackout Cometh" |
| 2015 | Whatever, Linda | Didi De May | web series |
| 2015 | The Book of Negroes | Bertilda | Episode #1.3 Episode #1.4 |
| 2017 | Orphan Black | Brie | Episode: "Manacled Slim Wrists" |
| 2017 | Law & Order: Special Victims Unit | Mrs. Salerno | Episode: "American Dream" |
| 2018 | Titans | Ms. Bond | Episode: "Origins" |
| 2018 | Frankie Drake Mysteries | Dot | Episode: "Dressed to Kill" |
| 2018-2019 | Anne with an E | Mary Lacroix | 6 Episodes |
| 2019 | Street Legal | Lily Rue | Starring role, Tv Series: 6 episodes |
| 2021 | Departure | Dr. Lopez | 4 Episodes |
| 2021 | The Resident | Rose Williams | 8 Episodes |
| 2021 | Hudson & Rex | Elanie Lewis | Episode: "Sleeping Beauty" |
| 2022 | Revenge of the Black Best Friend | Cynthia | Comedy web series |
| 2023 | Manifest | Jessica Halvorsen | Episode: "Ghost Plane" Episode: "Final Boarding" |

=== Film ===
| Year | Title | Role | Notes |
|---|---|---|---|
| 2012 | Twelfth Night | Maria | |
| 2013 | Momsters Playground | Verona | Short |
| 2014 | The Anniversary | Anne | |
| 2015 | Across The Line | Lori Downey | |
| 2015 | Chameleon | Sheryse | Short |
| 2016 | Jean of the Joneses | Laura Simmons | |
| 2017 | The Definites | Madison | |
| 2017 | The Mavericks | Becky | Short |
| 2017 | The Meaning of Life | Nurse Sherry | |
| 2018 | Emmy | | Short |
| 2021 | Sometime Other than Now | Anita | Short |
| 2021 | Home Sweet Home Alone | Aunt Beth | |
| 2021 | PAW Patrol: The Movie | Additional Voices | Voice role |
| 2021 | Stanleyville | Felicie Arkady | |
| 2022 | Diaspora | Melina | Short |

=== Videogames ===
| Year | Title | Role | Notes |
|---|---|---|---|
| 2016 | Far Cry Primal | Sayla | |
| 2018 | Far Cry 5 | Dr. Sarah Perkins | |
| 2018 | Assassin's Creed Odyssey | Xenia | |
| 2019 | Far Cry New Dawn | Mickey | |
| 2020 | Hyper Scape | Nahari | |
| 2021 | Far Cry 6 | Lita | |
| 2023 | Avatar: Frontiers of Pandora | Etuwa | |
