= Adam Brown (actor) =

British actor and comedian

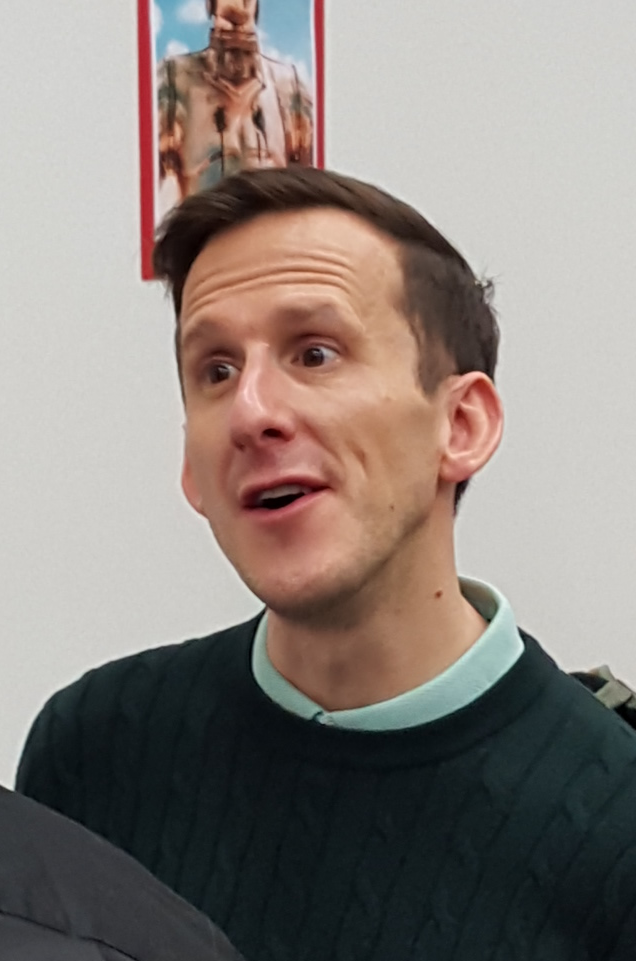
- Adam Brown in 2015
- Born: 29 May 1980 (age 46); Hungerford, Berkshire, England

Adam Brown (born 29 May 1980) is an English actor and comedian. He is best known for playing the dwarf Ori in Peter Jackson's Hobbit trilogy and Cremble in Pirates of the Caribbean: Dead Men Tell No Tales.

== Life and stage career ==
He studied at the John O'Gaunt Community Technology College in his birthplace, Hungerford, Berkshire. Following his time at John O'Gaunt, he trained in Performing Arts at Middlesex University, London, where he met Clare Plested and helped co-found the British comedy theatre troupe Plested and Brown. He wrote and performed in all seven of their shows: Carol Smillie Trashed my Room, The Reconditioned Wife Show, Flamingo Flamingo Flamingo, Hot Pursuit, Minor Spectacular, Health & Stacey and The Perfect Wife Roadshow. A regular at the Edinburgh Festival he toured with his company across the UK as well as performances in Armenia, South Korea and New Zealand. With the rest of the Plested and Brown team (Amanda Wilsher and Clare Plested) he has worked with David Sant (Peepolykus), Phelim McDermott (Improbable), Cal McCrystal (The Mighty Boosh) and Toby Wilsher (ex-Trestle).

== Film and television career ==
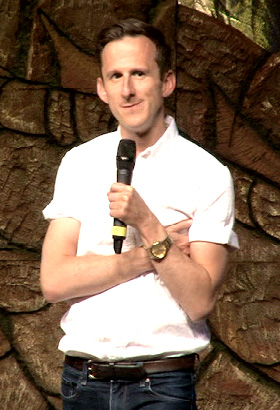
Adam Brown in 2015 at the Hobbitcon III convention in Bonn, Germany

Brown plays the dwarf Ori in the film series based on J. R. R. Tolkien's The Hobbit. The films marked his first film appearance. Commenting on Brown's casting, director Peter Jackson was quoted as saying, "Adam is a wonderfully expressive actor and has a unique screen presence. I look forward to seeing him bring Ori to life."

== Personal life ==
Brown is openly gay and lives in Brighton. Brown married his long-term partner, stage and screen actor Charles Brunton, in 2024.

== Stage work ==
Year	Work	Location	Role
2000	Carol Smillie Trashed My Room		
2001	The Reconditioned Wife Show		
2003	Flamingo Flamingo Flamingo		
2005	Hot Pursuit		
2005	The OFSTED Inspector		
2007	Beauty and the Beast	Newbury Corn Exchange	
2008	Minor Spectacular		
2008	Aladdin	Newbury Corn Exchange	
2009	Health & Stacey		
2009	Mucking Around		
2009	Puss in Boots	Newbury Corn Exchange	
2010	The Perfect Wife Roadshow		
2010	Sleeping Beauty	Newbury Corn Exchange	
2021	Cinderella	Newbury Corn Exchange	
2022	Mother Goose	UK Tour	
2023	Iolanthe	English National Opera	the Page

== Filmography ==
=== Television ===
Year	Title	Role	Notes
2009	ChuckleVision	Oswald Potter	Episode: "Top of the Cops"
2017	The End of the F***ing World	Kyle	
2026	House of the Dragon	Glendon Footly	Episode: "Tumbleton"

=== Film ===
Year	Title	Role	Notes
2012	The Hobbit: An Unexpected Journey	Ori	
2013	The Hobbit: The Desolation of Smaug	Ori	
2013	Minimus	Minimus	Short film
2014	The Hobbit: The Battle of the Five Armies	Ori	
2016	The Limehouse Golem	Mr. Gerrard	
2017	Pirates of the Caribbean: Dead Men Tell No Tales	Cremble	
2021	Stanleyville	Manny Jumpcannon	

=== Video games ===
Year	Title	Role	Notes
2016	The Bunker	John	
