= Marguerite McNeil =

Canadian actress (1935–2021)

Marguerite McNeil (January 21, 1935 – November 6, 2021), née MacDougall, was a Canadian film and television actress and playwright, best known for her recurring role as Marguerite Murphy in the television series Trailer Park Boys.

A native of Glace Bay, Nova Scotia, she moved to New York City after high school to study acting, and had stage roles in New York City, London and Toronto before moving back to Nova Scotia to be near her family. In Nova Scotia she had regular stage roles, including productions of Alec Butler's Black Friday, Janet Munday's The Sewer Show, Tennessee Williams's Cat on a Hot Tin Roof and Bryden MacDonald's The Weekend Healer, Divinity Bash Nine Lives and The Extasy of Bedridden Riding Hood.

She also collaborated with MacDonald in the writing of the plays Our Miserable Lives and An Island Woman, and was an acting teacher.

Apart from a small appearance in the 1981 film My Bloody Valentine, she began acting in film and television primarily in the 1990s, with supporting roles in the films The Scarlet Letter and Sweet Angel Mine. She subsequently appeared in films including Love and Death on Long Island, New Waterford Girl, The Divine Ryans, Marion Bridge, Whole New Thing, Black Eyed Dog, Rhonda's Party and All the Wrong Reasons, and the television series Lexx, Shattered City: The Halifax Explosion and Mr. D.

She won an ACTRA Award for Outstanding Performance, Female in 2011 for Rhonda's Party, and the Legacy Award from the Robert Merritt Awards in 2012 for her lifetime contributions to Nova Scotia theatre.
