= Iceman (2017 film) =

2017 German adventure film

- Directed by: Felix Randau
- Written by: Felix Randau
- Produced by: Jan Krüger
- Starring: Jürgen Vogel; Franco Nero; Susanne Wuest
- Cinematography: Jakob Bejnaworicz
- Edited by: Vessela Martschewski
- Music by: Seelenluft
- Production companies: Port-au-Prince; Echo Film; Lucky Bird Pictures; Amour Fou Vienna
- Release date: 8 August 2017 (LFF)
- Running time: 96 minutes
- Countries: Germany; Italy; Austria
- Language: Rhaetian

Iceman (German: Der Mann aus dem Eis, lit. 'The Man from the Ice') is a 2017 German-Italian-Austrian adventure drama film written and directed by Felix Randau. It is a fictional story about the life of Ötzi, a natural mummy of a man discovered on 19 September 1991 in the Ötztal Alps.

The film, which was filmed in the Tyrolean and Bavarian Alps, features almost no dialogue, with a minimal amount in untranslated language based on reconstructed Rhaetian, created for the film by a linguist.

== Plot ==
In the Ötztal Alps, more than 5300 years ago, a Neolithic clan has settled near a creek. It is their leader Kelab's responsibility to be the keeper of the group's holy shrine, Tineka, contained in a wooden box. While Kelab is hunting, the settlement is attacked by three men, including Krant and his son Tasar. The attackers find the shrine and take it. The other members of the tribe are brutally murdered. The only survivor is a newborn baby. Blinded by pain and fury, Kelab sets out after the murderers on a trek through the Alps, bringing with him the newborn baby and a goat for its milk to feed the baby.

He comes across a group of three men and seemingly kills two of them before realizing these are not the persons who attacked his village. They appear to be a father and son and the third man is an abductee the other two had kidnapped. He decides to let the abductee go, warning the man to not follow him. He next meets an old man (named Ditob) and a younger woman (named Kulan). They allow him to stay with them for the night and feed him by the campfire. At night, the younger woman comes to him to have sex but he rebuffs her advances.

The next day he continues on his travels but he leaves the newborn baby and goat behind with the old man and woman. He catches up to the three attackers but the attackers are higher on the mountain and shoot arrows down at him. The arrows miss but one of the attackers falls off a cliff as Kelab chases them. Kelab approaches the dead body and gouges out his eyes while screaming his dead wife and son's names. The remaining two attackers get away, but Kelab pursues them high into the snowy Alps. He finally comes close to them and charges them both, wounding Tasar, but falls into a crevasse. He survives the fall and he unsuccessfully tries to climb out of the crevasse. Eventually, a rope is thrown down to him and he climbs out, his rescuer being the abductee from before.

Krant and Tasar make it to their camp and greet the younger man's wife, Mitar. While Mitar is comforting Tasar on his wounded leg, Kelab kills him with an arrow. Kelab and Krant fight, with Kelab overpowering and killing Krant. He returns to their camp to find the Tineka and brings Krant's body to the funeral pyre. During the night, Mitar unsuccessfully tries to kill him; Kelab quickly sets off again into the high Alps but is suddenly struck by an arrow shot by one of the two abductors from earlier, completing their own revenge. Kelab rolls down the mountainside before dying in the deep snow.

== Cast ==
- Jürgen Vogel – Kelab (Ötzi)
- Susanne Wuest – Kisis
- André Hennicke – Krant
- Sabin Tambrea – Tasar
- Violetta Schurawlow – Mitar
- Franco Nero – Ditob
- Anna F. – Kulan

== Historicity ==
Although analysis of the iceman's DNA has proven that his eyes were brown, the filmmakers, incongruously, portray them as blue. Said Randau, "That's just because the actor who plays Ötzi has blue eyes and we decided not to change it."

== Reception ==
On the review aggregator Rotten Tomatoes, the film has an approval rating of 88% based on 24 reviews, with a weighted average rating of 6.40 out of 10. The website's critical consensus reads: "A prehistoric drama with the heart of a western, Iceman uses classic archetypes – and deft direction – to tell a stark and simple yet powerfully effective story." On Metacritic, the film has a score of 52 out of 100, based on 6 critics, indicating "mixed or average reviews".

== Accolades ==
List of awards and nominations
Award	Date of ceremony	Category	Recipient(s)	Result	Ref.
German Film Awards	27 April 2018	Best Makeup	Heike Merker	Nominated	
German Film Awards	27 April 2018	Best Sound	Gregor Bonse, Thomas Neumann, Marc Parisotto	Nominated	
German Film Critics Association Awards	2 February 2018	Best Film Score	Beat Solèr	Won	
Hamburg International Film Festival	6 October 2018	Best Feature	Felix Randau	Nominated	
Locarno International Film Festival	11 August 2018	Variety Piazza Grande Award	Felix Randau	Nominated	
