= Dog Day (band) =

Canadian indie rock band

- Dog Day in 2007. (Photo: Francesca Talone)

Background information
- Origin: Halifax, Nova Scotia, Canada
- Genres: Indie rock, Pop Music, Punk
- Years active: 2004-2013; 2018-present
- Labels: Fundog, Tomlab, Outside Music, Black Mountain Music, Out Of Touch Records, Divorce Records, NOYES Records
- Members: Nancy Urich; Seth Smith; KC Spidle; Meg Yoshida
- Past members: Crystal Thili; Rob Shedden; Seamus Dalton; Mark Grundy
- Website: Dogdaymusic.com

Dog Day is a Canadian indie rock band based in Halifax, Nova Scotia currently consisting of husband and wife team Seth Smith and Nancy Urich, joined with Casey Spidle and Meg Yoshida.

== History ==
Smith began a solo project Hi-Firey; he joined with Urich and began the band as a side project from their main band, The Burdocks. The duo soon changed their name to Dog Day when another husband and wife pair, KC Spidle and Crystal Thili, joined the band. The band released its debut EP, Thank You in 2005, initially on homemade CD-Rs and later in a rerelease on Out of Touch Records. They were subsequently signed to German label Tomlab.

They released their debut full length, Night Group, in 2007 on Tomlab, and followed up with Concentration in 2009 which was mixed and produced by John Agnello at Water Music Recording in Hoboken, New Jersey.

Spidle subsequently left the band following his divorce from Thili, and was temporarily replaced by Rob Shedden. Shedden left the band to focus on Long Long Long, and original members Urich and Smith recorded released a third album as a duo. Deformer was released on their own label, Fundog in 2011.

In late 2013, the duo released a fourth album called Fade Out. It was recorded at their home studio seeing Spidle, Michael Catano and Dale Fahey play as guest musicians. After the release, the duo toured joined with Mark Grundy on bass and Seamus Dalton on drums. The record held the number one position on national college charts for two months. The band went on hiatus after the release of Fade Out.

On July 31, 2018, the band's hiatus ended with the announcement that they would be playing at SappyFest 2018.

== Discography ==
=== Albums ===
- 2007 - Night Group
- 2009 - Concentration
- 2011 - Deformer
- 2013 - Fade Out
- 2020 - Present
- 2024 - A T-shirt With Writing on It

=== EPs ===
- 2005 - Thank You
- 2007 - Borden Sessions/See You Later (split release with Husband and Knife)
- 2009 - Elder Schoolhouse

=== Singles ===
- 2007 - "Oh Dead Life"
- 2007 - "Lydia"

== See also ==
- Music of Canada
- Canadian rock
- List of Canadian musicians
- List of bands from Canada
- Category:Canadian musical groups
