= Look at Me (2024 film) =

2024 Canadian comedy-drama film

- Film poster
- Directed by: Taylor Olson
- Written by: Taylor Olson
- Produced by: Taylor Olson; Koumbie; Kirsten Luella Bruce
- Starring: Taylor Olson; Koumbie
- Cinematography: Tim Mombourquette
- Edited by: Shawn Beckwith
- Production company: Afro Viking Pictures
- Release date: January 22, 2024 (Slamdance)
- Running time: 87 minutes
- Country: Canada
- Language: English

Look at Me is a 2024 Canadian comedy-drama film, written, produced, and directed by Taylor Olson. Adapted from his own semi-autobiographical stage play of the same name, the film stars Olson as a fictionalized version of himself, a bisexual actor who goes on a difficult emotional journey toward self-acceptance after suffering a relapse in his prior struggle with an eating disorder.

The cast also includes Koumbie, Sam Vigneault, Josh MacDonald, Oliver Boyle, Jessica Barry, Thom Payne, Jeremy Smith, Matthew Lumley, Frietzen Kenter, Varun Guru, Emily Jewer, Beth Amiro, David Light, Kathleen Dorian, Peter Sarty, Richie Wilcox and Stephanie MacDonald in supporting roles.

Olson has called the film a "fictional autobiography", clarifying that while the film is based on his own personal experiences, some parts of it were fictionalized for the purposes of making the story more dramatically compelling. His original play was a one-man show, with the other characters added for the film.

The film premiered in the Unstoppable Features section of the 2024 Slamdance Film Festival. It had its Canadian premiere at the Canadian Film Festival, where Olson won the award for Best Performance.

== Production ==
Look at me was funded by the Canada Council for the Arts, Arts Nova Scotia, and the province of Nova Scotia.

== Critical response ==
Reviews for the film are generally positive.

In Film Threat, Ryan Devir wrote: "Look At Me effectively creates anxiety in the audience. It's uncomfortable, jarring in its editing, charming, hopeful, bleak, and succeeds in putting the viewer in Taylor's emotional state."

Writing in ScreenFish, Steve Norton said: "It's this emphasis on men's mental health that makes the film feel like an anomaly. While other film's breach the topic, Look at Me courageously sits within it. Olson is shown to be a man who appears to have deeper humility than many other men. Even so, he still struggles to acknowledge his own feelings out loud. As such, Look seems to dive into the waters of masculinity in ways that other film's only tiptoe. With his battle with bulimia and self-image, we are shown the damage of male toxicity when it is turned inwards as opposed to against others. This can make the film a difficult watch, but still utterly essential."

== Awards ==
Olson received a Canadian Screen Award nomination for Best Lead Performance in a Comedy Film at the 13th Canadian Screen Awards in 2025.
