= West Dalhousie =

Community in Nova Scotia, Canada

Coordinates: 44°43′8.15″N 65°13′32.99″W

West Dalhousie in Nova Scotia

West Dalhousie is a community in the Canadian province of Nova Scotia, located in Annapolis County. It is named after George Ramsay, 9th Earl of Dalhousie. In 2025, a wildfire prompted an evacuation.
