= Christian Murray =

Canadian actor and writer

Christian Murray is a Canadian actor and writer. He has written for This Hour Has 22 Minutes, Talking to Americans and Daily Tips for Modern Living, and wrote the play Bone Boy which he directed in Halifax in 2012.

He lives in Halifax, Nova Scotia, with his partner Mary-Colin Chisholm and their daughter Emlyn.

== Awards ==
- Canadian Comedy Award, 2001 and 2002, for This Hour Has 22 Minutes
- Gemini Award, "Best Writing in a Comedy or Variety Program or Series", 2000, for This Hour Has 22 Minutes
