= Diggstown (TV series) =

2019 Canadian TV series

- Genre: Legal drama
- Created by: Floyd Kane
- Directed by: Lynne Stopkewich; Kelly Makin; Cory Bowles
- Starring: Vinessa Antoine; Natasha Henstridge; C. David Johnson; Stacey Farber; Brandon Oakes; Shailene Garnett; Tim Rozon; Dwain Murphy
- Country of origin: Canada
- No. of seasons: 4
- No. of episodes: 26

Production
- Executive producers: Floyd Kane; Amos Adetuyi; Brenda Greenberg; Todd Berger; Kelly Makin
- Production locations: Halifax, Nova Scotia and Martinique Beach Provincial Park, Nova Scotia
- Running time: 44 min.
- Production companies: Circle Blue Entertainment; Freddie Films Inc; DHX Media

Original release
- Network: CBC
- Release: March 6, 2019 – November 16, 2022

Diggstown is a Canadian legal drama television series created by Floyd Kane. The first Canadian drama series to feature a Black Canadian woman as its lead character, the series stars Vinessa Antoine as Marcie Diggs, a lawyer who leaves her high-powered corporate job to work for a legal aid clinic in Dartmouth, Nova Scotia, after her aunt commits suicide.

The first season premiered on CBC Television on March 6, 2019. A second season was announced in May 2019, following the conclusion of the first season. On June 21, 2020, the series was renewed for a third season which is set to premiere on October 6, 2021. In early 2021, Fox picked up the series for distribution, but the series ultimately never aired on the network.

The CBC announced in October 2022 that the show's fourth season would be its last, with the finale scheduled to air on November 16.

== Plot ==
Diggstown follows Marcie Diggs (Vinessa Antoine), a star corporate lawyer who reconsiders her priorities and moves back home (to the greater Halifax-Dartmouth area) to work in a legal-aid office after her beloved aunt takes her own life following the pressures of a malicious prosecution.

== Cast ==
- Vinessa Antoine as Marcie Diggs
- Natasha Henstridge as Colleen MacDonnell
- C. David Johnson as Reggie Thompson
- Stacey Farber as Pam MacLean
- Brandon Oakes as Doug Paul
- Shailene Garnett as Iris Beals
- Tim Rozon as Constable Carson Myers
- Dwain Murphy as Avery Mueller
- Mpho Koaho as Percy Lincoln
- Kim Roberts as Ona Reeves

== Episodes ==
Season	Episodes	Originally released	
Season	Episodes	First released	Last released
1	6	March 6, 2019	April 3, 2019
2	6	March 4, 2020	April 1, 2020
3	8	October 6, 2021	November 24, 2021
4	6	October 12, 2022	November 16, 2022

=== Season 1 (2019) ===
No. overall	No. in season	Title	Directed by	Written by	Original release date	Canadian viewers
1	1	"Willy MacIsaac"	Kelly Makin	Floyd Kane	March 6, 2019	338,000
We are introduced to Marcie Diggs, a former top corporate lawyer who has left her profession to return home (to the greater Halifax-Dartmouth area) and to work in a legal aid office. Marcie struggles with her anger towards the pastor whom she blames for her aunt Rolanda's suicide (the pastor banned her from her church and called her "filth"). Marcie represents a father who is charged with DUI. Pam represents a friend.
2	2	"Renee Joy"	Cory Bowles	Floyd Kane	March 13, 2019	291,000
Marcie is representing Renee Joy, a girl strip-searched by police. But an activist lawyer, Percy Lincoln, pursues the matter as a human rights complaint, which could result in Renee not getting a much needed scholarship.
3	3	"Taisir Ahmed"	Lynne Stopkewich	Andrew Burrows-Trotman	March 20, 2019	296,000
Taisir, one of Marcie's clients, is grabbed by secret police and being held with an accusation of terrorism (which will make him unavailable for upcoming appointment that he has to be at for getting his mother a visitor's visa). Marcie tries to find Taisir, but the authorities keep shuffling him around so his lawyer can't be present to represent him. Pam takes over case of one of Marcie's client who is in dispute with a slumlord and Pam works on getting client a new place to live. Doug Paul is concerned his daughter is being taken advantage of by her 'mentor'.
4	4	"Delroy Nelson"	Kelly Makin	Ellen Vanstone	March 27, 2019	279,000
Matthew Clarke starts a bar fight (with Delroy) that ends with Matthew on ground and not breathing. Delroy starts to do CPR, but his action is misinterpreted and he is dragged away from patient. Skip to weeks later and deceased's mother is charge of media that are attacking Delroy's character.
5	5	"Nikki LeBlanc"	Cory Bowles	Lynn Coady	April 3, 2019	231,000
6	6	"Kim Bond"	Lynne Stopkewich	Floyd Kane	April 3, 2019	162,000

=== Season 2 (2020) ===
No. overall	No. in season	Title	Directed by	Written by	Original release date	Canadian viewers
7	1	"Vince Hu"	Kelly Makin	Floyd Kane & Priscilla White	March 4, 2020	195,000
A newly graduated RCMP patrolman is involved in a high-speed road traffic accident, where a mother of two dies at the scene. Marcie faces persecution from her neighborhood and friends when she tries to defend him. Some of his colleagues take matters into their own hands to bias the case, further hampering Marcie's work.
8	2	"Cheryl Battiste"	Cory Bowles	Lynn Coady & Priscilla White	March 11, 2020	N/A
A young Miꞌkmaq woman stands accused of murdering a white teen after she and her friend are racially and physically attacked by the teen and his companion.
9	3	"Willy MacIsaac Redux"	Cory Bowles	Floyd Kane & Priscilla White	March 18, 2020	141,000
10	4	"Tanya Ivanova"	Sharon Lewis	Ellen Vanstone	March 25, 2020	N/A
11	5	"Vi Bayley"	Lynne Stopkewich	Lisa Codrington & Priscilla White	April 1, 2020	N/A
12	6	"Dani Ewing"	Cory Bowles	Priscilla White	April 1, 2020	N/A

=== Season 3 (2021) ===
No. overall	No. in season	Title	Directed by	Written by	Original release date
13	1	"Nina Francis"	Cory Bowles	Floyd Kane	October 6, 2021
14	2	"Jojo Carvery"	Cory Bowles	Lynn Coady	October 13, 2021
15	3	"Percy Lincoln"	Cory Bowles	Lakna Edilima & Ellen Vanstone	October 20, 2021
16	4	"Enter Vivian Jefferson"	Lynne Stopkewich	Floyd Kane	October 27, 2021
17	5	"Ivy Maloney"	Juanita Peters	Lynn Coady & Amber-Sekowan Daniels	November 3, 2021
18	6	"Miles Jones"	Lynne Stopkewich	Floyd Kane & Motion Brathwaite	November 10, 2021
19	7	"Christian Spry"	Shamim Sarif	Ellen Vanstone & JP Larocque	November 17, 2021
20	8	"Riley Seaver"	Robert Adetuyi	Floyd Kane & Lynn Coady	November 24, 2021

=== Season 4 (2022) ===
No. overall	No. in season	Title	Directed by	Written by	Original release date
21	1	"Larissa Crooks"	Cory Bowles	Floyd Kane	October 12, 2022
22	2	"Basil Allen"	Rama Rau	JP Larocque & Caleigh Bacchus	October 19, 2022
23	3	"Donald Kitpu Christmas"	Cory Bowles	Ellen Vanstone & Roxann Whitebean	October 26, 2022
24	4	"Trudy Willis"	Shamim Sarif	Floyd Kane & Lakna Edilima & James Battiston	November 2, 2022
25	5	"Marcie Diggs"	Shamim Sarif	Lynn Coady	November 9, 2022
26	6	"Cruz Diaz"	Floyd Kane	Floyd Kane	November 16, 2022

== International release ==
BET+ acquired U.S. streaming rights to the series in April 2020. Fox acquired the U.S. television broadcast rights for the series in January 2021, however this never occurred and the show wasn't aired on the network during the 2021-22 television season. BET later on started airing the series on linear television in the US in January 2024.

== Reception ==
The series has received at least one positive review. The Globe and Mail called the series "a charming, no-glitz legal drama".
