= The Mountain and the Valley =

1952 novel by Ernest Buclker

- Canadian Critical Edition (2010)
- Author: Ernest Buckler
- Language: English
- Publication date: 1952

The Mountain and the Valley is the 1952 debut novel by Canadian author Ernest Buckler.

== Synopsis ==
The novel focuses on the life of David Canaan, a young man growing up in rural Nova Scotia.

== Release ==
The Mountain and the Valley was first published in 1952 through Clarke, Irwin & Company. Per William French of The Globe and Mail, the novel caused Buckler to receive "star treatment" in New York and comparisons to literary mainstays such as D. H. Lawrence, Thomas Wolfe, and Ernest Hemingway. Rights to the book in the United States were obtained by New American Library; 150,000 copies were sold alongside 7,000 hardback novels, a feat that French commented was unusual for the literary debut of an unknown novelist.

Despite also receiving praise from Canadian critics, the book initially sold poorly in Canada, something that French attributes to a lack of promotion and for Clarke, Irwin & Company, which held the Canadian rights, opting to only import approximately 500 copies of their United States release. They had initially only ordered 250 copies, which they doubled only after receiving pressure to increase the numbers. French reported that Buckler was invited to sign copies at a Halifax bookstore, however the lack of physical copies meant that the store was unable to obtain any for the signing. They encouraged Buckler to come if he could supply his own copies for signing.

The Mountain and the Valley has been republished in Canada through the New Canadian Library, which by 1972 had sold 28,000 copies and was in its fifth printing.

== Reception ==
Critical reception for The Mountain and the Valley has been favorable and poet Alden Nowlan has called it "one of the great novels of the English language", a sentiment shared by journalist William French. The book was a common staple of Canadian literature courses in the 1970s and 80s, however Robert Reid of Waterloo Region Record noted that as of 2004 it was taught less frequently.

In 1952 Stuart Keate reviewed the novel for The New York Times, writing that "Had his excesses of imagery, his infatuation with the language, been curbed by a somewhat sterner editorial pencil, it is altogether possible that this good book might have been a great one."
