= The Crescent (film) =

- Directed by: Seth A. Smith
- Screenplay by: Darcy Spidle
- Story by: Seth A. Smith
- Produced by: Nancy Urich
- Starring: Danika Vandersteen, Woodrow Graves, Terrance Murray, Britt Loder, Andrew Gillis
- Cinematography: Craig Buckley
- Edited by: Seth A. Smith
- Music by: Seth A. Smith
- Production company: Cut/Off/Tail Pictures
- Distributed by: Raven Banner
- Release date: 7 September 2017 (Toronto)
- Running time: 99 minutes
- Country: Canada
- Language: English

The Crescent is a Canadian horror film directed by Seth A. Smith, which premiered at the 2017 Toronto International Film Festival. The story centres around a painter and her two-year-old son at a remote seaside cottage following a death in the family.

== Plot ==
After the death of her husband, Beth with her toddler son Lowen escape to a remote family beach house. There, Beth copes with her grief and the new struggles of single parenting by losing herself in her art, the process of paper marbling. Lowen also seems to be affected by the loss and frequently acts out in tantrums which causes Beth to further detach from him. After a series of hazardous mishaps in the new environment, the two begin to rebuild their bond. But a strange neighbor named Joseph seems intent on breaking up the two. And as a result of his meddling, Beth descends further into grief. In a rash act, she abandons Lowen by attempting to drown herself in the sea. Lowen finds himself alone, forced to fend for himself and save his mother from the ghoulish residents of the beach.

== Cast ==
- Danika Vandersteen as Beth
- Woodrow Graves as Lowen
- Terrance Murray as Joseph
- Andrew Gillis as Pete
- Britt Loder as Sam
- Andrea Kenyon as Gramma

== Reception ==
At the Atlantic International Film Festival, the film won awards for Best Performance by an Actress, Best Atlantic Original Score, and Best Atlantic Screenwriting. The film was also nominated for the Directors Guild of Canada's DGC Discovery Award.

Reviews of the film are generally positive. On review aggregator Rotten Tomatoes, the film holds an approval rating of 75%, based on 12 reviews, with an average rating of 7.4/10. Barry Hertz of The Globe and Mail gave the film a 3.5 out of 4 calling it "New and brilliant horror." John Defore of The Hollywood Reporter gave it a 3 out of 5 and described it as "A self-consciously artsy horror film set in liminal places like the seashore and the border between wakefulness and sleep." Kurt Halfyard of Screen Anarchy named it "A visionary fusion of horror tradition and originality."
