= Marion Bridge (film) =

- Theatrical release poster
- Directed by: Wiebke von Carolsfeld
- Written by: Daniel MacIvor
- Starring: Molly Parker; Rebecca Jenkins; Stacy Smith; Marguerite McNeil; Elliot Page
- Music by: Lesley Barber
- Distributed by: Mongrel Media (Canada)
- Release date: September 7, 2002 (Toronto Film Festival)
- Running time: 90 minutes
- Country: Canada
- Language: English

Marion Bridge is a 2002 Canadian drama film directed by Wiebke von Carolsfeld. The film won the award for Best Canadian First Feature Film at the 2002 Toronto International Film Festival. Based on a dramatic play by Daniel MacIvor, the film is notable for being Elliot Page's first performance in a feature film.

== Plot ==
Agnes (Molly Parker), an alcoholic and drug-user who is struggling to overcome her self-destructive behaviour, returns from Toronto, Ontario, to her Cape Breton Island hometown of Sydney, Nova Scotia, because of the failing health of her mother Rose (Marguerite McNeil). Rose, an Irish-Canadian who is also an alcoholic, lies dying of cancer at a local hospital. Agnes stays at her childhood home with her older sister Theresa (Rebecca Jenkins), a devout Catholic whose husband recently left her for a younger woman, and Louise (Stacy Smith), a middle sister who has retreated from the outside world. Waiting at their mother's deathbed, they are forced to face the resentments, trust issues, and scars of their past, particularly the sexual abuse they suffered at the hands of their father, as they make peace with one another and with their mother.

The sisters bring their ailing mother home despite the mistrust they feel at Agnes' pledge to care for Rose, but Agnes cleans the house, acts what appears to be responsibly, and even encourages Louise to play her guitar and socialize with a friend from church. When Theresa's husband Donnie is left by his girlfriend, Theresa is compelled to comfort him and clean his house as she blames herself for his betrayal; he wanted children while she didn't, which is in her mind is a sin.

Agnes is unable to stop herself repeatedly driving to a gift shop in rural Marion Bridge in hopes of building a relationship with 16-year-old Joanie (Elliot Page), her daughter who resulted from the rape by her father. When Theresa finds out what Agnes has been doing, she warns her sister not to tell Joanie about her relationship to their family, and she refuses to consider Agnes' suggestion that they talk to their father.

Eventually Theresa relents about meeting Joanie, and accompanies Agnes to a meeting with her. Joanie's adoptive mother Chrissy (Hollis McLaren) confronts them, and asks that they wait until Joanie is an adult before telling her their secret. When Joanie visits the sisters and asks Agnes whether she is her mother, Agnes denies it, telling her Chrissy is her real mother.

Before she dies, the girls’ mother Rose asks her daughters to forgive her for ignoring things she didn't want to see as she believed it was best for everyone. The sisters finally visit their father, who is suffering from dementia, and his wife. With Agnes' encouragement, Louise buys a new truck and the sisters drive out to Marion Bridge for a picnic with Joanie and Chrissy.

== Production ==
The film was shot in Halifax, Nova Scotia and Cape Breton Island including Whitney Pier and Sydney River.

== Critical response ==
On the review aggregator website Rotten Tomatoes, 76% of 17 critics' reviews are positive. Metacritic, which uses a weighted average, assigned the film a score of 71 out of 100, based on 10 critics, indicating "generally favorable" reviews.

In The New York Times review, film critic Stephen Holden praised Marion Bridge as "exquisitely acted" as well as "truthful and quietly compelling," adding that "it uncovers a complexity and depth of feeling rarely glimpsed in a family drama."
