= Mary-Colin Chisholm =

Canadian actress

Mary-Colin Chisholm is a Canadian actress, playwright, and co-assistant director of the theatre companies LunaSea Theatre and Frankie Productions.

== Career ==
In 2000, Chisholm directed the theatrical piece called Frankie, starring Mary Ellen Maclean. Christian Murray coached the movement and provided sound for the play and the three later founded the theatre company Frankie Productions. Chisholm was then commissioned to write the CBC radio series He'd Be Your Mother's Father's Cousin, which she later adapted to for the stage.

In 2005, Chisholm appeared as Christine in Daniel MacIvor's How It Works. Chisholm performed in a co-op production of The Donahue Sisters by Geraldine Aron at the TNS Studio Space in Halifax in 2006. Four of the actors later decided to form a theatre company which was incorporated in 2007 as LunaSea Theatre. The company has performed, amongst others, Chisholm's To Capture Light, Alan Bennett's Talking Heads, and an all-woman production of Twelfth Night (2009).

In 2008, Chisholm performed in Christian Murray's play, Bone Boy, as the mother of a child brought to life from a tooth.

In 2010, Chisholm played the emergency medical technician, Eleanor Carr, in the SyFy-produced TV series Haven and she also appeared in the Canadian thriller The Corridor.

Chisholm directed Lauchie, Liza and Rory by Sheldon Currie in 2010 for the Eastern Front Theatre and in 2011 for the Mulgrave Road Theatre, in association with Frankie Productions at the National Arts Centre in Ottawa, Ontario. She also performed in Caryl Churchill's Top Girls for the LunaSea Theatre, as well as in Michel Nadeau's And Slowly Beauty ... playing the waitress Anita.

In 2012, Chisholm performed the role of God in the play, Creation, and in a one-woman version of her play He'd Be Your Mother's Father's Cousin at Festival Antigonish.

In 2014, Chisholm appeared in the award-winning film Cast No Shadow.

Chisholm's play Half-Cracked: The Legend of Sugar Mary premiered at Neptune Theatre in Halifax, Nova Scotia in 2018 under the direction of Martha Irving.

== Playwright credits ==
- Safe Haven (1991)
- He'd Be Your Mother's Father's Cousin (2000)
- Strange Humours (2000)
- To Capture Light (2008)
- Half-Cracked: The Legend of Sugar Mary (2018)

== Television credits ==
- Black Harbour (1996 - 1999)
- Pit Pony (1999)
- Made in Canada (1999 - 2003)
- Haven (2010)

== Filmography ==
Year	Title
2003	Homeless to Harvard: The Liz Murray Story
2008	The Memory Keeper's Daughter
2009	Trailer Park Boys: Countdown to Liquor Day
2010	The Corridor
2011	Cloudburst
2014	Cast No Shadow
2018	Splinters
2021	Wildhood

== Awards ==
In 2008, Chisholm was the recipient of the Mayor's Award for Achievement in Theatre at the Robert Merritt Awards. Chisholm has been nominated for several Robert Merritt Awards including Outstanding Actress (in 2011 for Woman and Scarecrow, 2009 for Talking Heads: An Evening of Alan Bennett Monologues, and 2002 for Sisters), Outstanding Director (2011 for Lauchie, Liza and Rory), Outstanding Play by a Nova Scotian Playwright (2003 with Jackie Torrens, Ed Thomasen, and Bruce Barton for Private Views) and Outstanding Supporting Actress (2007 for The Little Years). Chisholm was awarded the Theatre Nova Scotia Legacy Award at the 2018 Robert Merritt Awards. In 2019, she was nominated at the Merritt Awards in the category Outstanding Play by a Nova Scotian Playwright for her play Half-Cracked: The Legend of Sugar Mary.
