= The Corridor (2010 film) =

- Film poster
- Directed by: Evan Kelly
- Written by: Josh MacDonald
- Produced by: Gilles Bélanger; Craig Cameron; Josh MacDonald; Mike Masters
- Starring: Stephen Chambers; James Gilbert; David Patrick Flemming; Mary-Colin Chisholm; Nigel Bennett
- Cinematography: Christopher Ball
- Edited by: Thorben Bieger
- Release dates: 22 September 2010 (Atlantic Film Festival); 30 March 2012
- Running time: 98 minutes
- Country: Canada
- Language: English

The Corridor is a 2010 Canadian horror film directed by Evan Kelly and starring Stephen Chambers, James Gilbert, David Patrick Flemming, Mary-Colin Chisholm and Nigel Bennett.

== Plot ==
Friends on a weekend excursion follow a path into a forest that leads to death and horror.

A group of high school friends reunite years later for a weekend of partying and catching up on old times. Isolated deep in the snow-covered forest, they stumble upon a mysterious corridor of light. Like a drug, the corridor's energy consumes them, driving them to the point of madness. One by one, they turn on each other, taking their evil to the next level. Mayhem leads to murder as they race to outlast each other, and the corridor's supernatural powers.

== Cast ==
- Stephen Chambers as Tyler Crawley
- James Gilbert as Everett Manette
- David Patrick Flemming as Chris Comeau
- Matthew Amyotte as Robert 'Bobcat' Comeau
- Glen Matthews as Jim 'Huggs' Huggan
- Mary-Colin Chisholm as Pauline Crawley
- Nigel Bennett as Lee Shephard
- Elphege Bernard as Female Student
- Heather Salsbury as Lee

== Reception ==
Dread Central said, "The dynamic between the actors, the graphic but controlled violence, and the psychedelic, sci-fi wonderment of The Corridor make it well worth your time."

Horror News said, "While we would like many more questions to be answered, the “lack of” feels ok in this instance to allow for the mystery elements to fully embellish. “The Corridor” is a fantastic thrill ride of horror and science fiction worth seeing."
