= Spinster (film) =

2019 Canadian film

- Film poster
- Directed by: Andrea Dorfman
- Written by: Jennifer Deyell
- Starring: Chelsea Peretti; Jonathan Watton; Kate Lynch; Susan Kent; Nadia Tonen
- Cinematography: Stéphanie Weber Biron
- Release date: December 6, 2019 (Whistler)
- Running time: 87 minutes
- Country: Canada
- Language: English

Spinster is a 2019 Canadian film directed by Andrea Dorfman and written by Jennifer Deyell.

The film premiered at the 2019 Whistler Film Festival and was released on August 7, 2020.

Chelsea Peretti stars as Gaby, the titular spinster, who at the age of 39 struggles with the fact that she is still single and has never had children.

== Plot ==
Gaby (Peretti) is a charismatic caterer who lives in Halifax, Nova Scotia. On her 39th birthday, she arrives home and catches her boyfriend of three months moving out. He admits that he only intended their relationship to be a fling and was never truly attracted to Gaby. Gaby is depressed but her married best friend Amanda reassures her that she still has time to marry and have children.

Encouraged by Amanda, Gaby awkwardly begins to search for a new man to enter a relationship with. After making a connection with one of her Tinder dates, Gaby is crushed when he leaves immediately after they have sex.

After her disastrous date, Gaby takes a break from dating and begins to consider what she wants with her life and begins living in the moment instead of putting decisions on hold to accommodate any future partners. After her father offers to give her the money he would have spent on her wedding in a lump sum, Gaby decides to open a restaurant. After talking to her neighbour, a professor who never married or had children, Gaby begins to make peace with being alone and pursues her relationships with her family and friends.

While out on a hike, Gaby finds a stranger, Will, who was lost in the woods. After rescuing him, the two form an immediate bond and kiss; Gaby is disappointed to discover he lives on the opposite coast in B.C. Though Will wants to pursue a relationship with Gaby, she turns him down deciding that she is happy with her life as it currently is.

On her 40th birthday, Gaby opens her restaurant named after her dog.

== Reception ==
As of October 2021, 82% of the 34 reviews compiled on Rotten Tomatoes are positive, with an average rating of 6.5/10. The website's critics consensus reads: "Led by a nuanced performance from Chelsea Peretti, Spinster offers a refreshingly three-dimensional -- and often very funny -- picture of modern single life." On Metacritic, it had a score of 56 out of 100 based on reviews from 9 critics.

Writing for Cult MTL, Alex Rose wrote that the film was essentially an "anti-romantic comedy", making use of many romantic comedy tropes in the service of a story about the positive aspects of being single.
