= Shelley Thompson =

Canadian actress

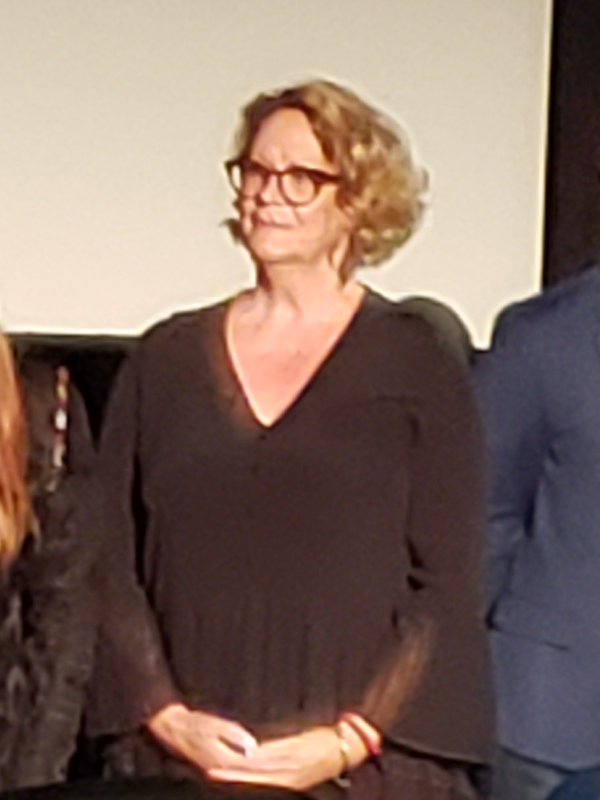
- Born: March 9, 1959 (age 66); Calgary, Alberta, Canada
- Education: Royal Academy of Dramatic Art
- Occupation: Actress
- Children: T. Thomason

Shelley Alice Thompson (born March 9, 1959) is a Canadian actress. She is best known for her character Barbara Lahey on the hit mockumentary program Trailer Park Boys.

== Biography ==
Shelley Thompson was born in Calgary, Alberta. She was trained at RADA in London and worked for many years in the UK. She had played roles in London's West End and at the Royal National Theatre, as well as leading roles in regional theatres. She was a regular in BBC radio drama during her time in Britain, and recorded dozens of audio books – titles including works by Margaret Atwood and Jane Smiley. She played "Rita King" for the first six series of the Children's ITV comedy series, Mike and Angelo, and made guest appearances on Drop the Dead Donkey, EastEnders and Chelworth. She also played the role of Sarah's stepmother Irene Williams in Jim Henson's 1986 fantasy epic Labyrinth. She has appeared in all seasons of Trailer Park Boys, both specials, and the feature film.

Since returning to Canada, her work has included season at the Atlantic Theatre Festival (Ariel in the Tempest and Viola in Twelfth Night), work at the Neptune Theatre, The Prairie Theatre Exchange, The Globe Theatre, Regina, and Festival Antigonish.

Since 2012, she has been shifting her focus to stage and screenwriting and directing. Her plays include plays A Kind of Faith (2004), Leaving Wonderland (2015), children's plays Bluenose Billy (2006), (Note: She has also co-written with Sheldon Currie and Griffen Prize-winning poet Anne Simpson.) Belinda the Bicycle Witch (2008), Lost and Found (2009), and ...And How Are We Today. (Note: Also co-written with poet Anne Simpson.) She was also seen on stage in A Good Death, Be My Baby, and Criminal Genius".

She has been a finalist in the Atlantic Writing Competition as a poet. Her work has been featured in literary journals like Toward the Light and Papirmasse, as well as on the CBC website. Her short stories have also been included in anthologies and broadcast on CBC Radio, in collaboration with The Blue Engine String Quartet during Christmas of 2010 and 2011.

Presently shifting to writing/directing for film, she has just finished her first narrative short, DAWG (Festivals include the Atlantic Film Festival, The San Diego International Kids Film Festival, Nickle Film festival NFL and more....)

She is working on feature films Dawn, Her Dad and the Tractor, Billy, Dash and Dawg, and The Benefit. In 2015 she was a resident at the Canadian Film Centre, Toronto, as a screenwriter, and in 2016 was invited to be one of eight Women In the Director's Chair (2017).

In 2018, Thompson won the WIDC's Feature Film Award, a prize which goes toward the production of a female director's debut feature film.

Awards include: ACTRA Maritimes winner for (short) Two Penny Road-Kill 2013, Best Supporting Actress, LA's Love Unlimited Festival, 2011 for (short) WAKE, and Gemini, 2008, Best Ensemble, as Barb Lahey, for Trailer Park Boys. Merritt Award- Best Actress in a Leading Role- for Glorious. Several Stage nominations for: Humble Boy – Flora, Criminal Genius – Shirley, Tamara (Dora) – Aelis.
