= Werewolf (2016 film) =

2016 film

- Film poster
- Directed by: Ashley McKenzie
- Written by: Ashley McKenzie
- Produced by: Nelson MacDonald; Ashley McKenzie
- Starring: Andrew Gillis; Bhreagh MacNeil
- Cinematography: Scott Moore
- Edited by: Ashley McKenzie
- Music by: Youth Haunts
- Production company: Grassfire Films
- Distributed by: La Distributrice de films
- Release date: 9 September 2016 (TIFF)
- Running time: 79 minutes
- Country: Canada
- Language: English

Werewolf is a 2016 Canadian drama film directed by Ashley McKenzie and starring Andrew Gillis and Bhreagh MacNeil. It marks McKenzie's feature film directorial debut. The film premiered at the 2016 Toronto International Film Festival, and subsequently received numerous accolades, including several Canadian Screen Award nominations, and the $100,000 Toronto Film Critics Association prize for best Canadian film of the year in 2017.

== Premise ==
Werewolf centres on Blaise (Andrew Gillis) and Vanessa (Bhreagh MacNeil), two drug addicts living in New Waterford, Nova Scotia.

== Production ==
The film was shot on Cape Breton Island for 26 days, and was funded through various government grants, including from Telefilm Canada.

The story was inspired by a real-life couple in New Waterford; McKenzie learned they were referred to as "the lawnmower crackheads" because they went from house to house offering to mow people's lawns.

== Release ==
After premiering at the Toronto International Film Festival in 2016, Werewolf went on to screen at festivals across Canada including the Vancouver International Film Festival and Festival du nouveau cinema. Its international premiere was at the 67th Berlin International Film Festival. The film was released theatrically across Canada in 2017.

== Reception ==
=== Critical response ===
The film received mostly positive reviews from critics. On review aggregator Rotten Tomatoes, the film has an approval rating of 88% based on 17 reviews, with an average rating of 7.4/10. Metacritic gave the film a score of 73 out of 100 based on 9 critical reviews, indicating "generally favorable reviews".

The Hollywood Reporter called it a "cruel story of Canadian youth". Barry Hertz of The Globe and Mail gave the film a four star review and called it "one of the summer's best movies." Chris Knight of The National Post gave the film a three and a half star review and called it "an assured piece of storytelling." In an article called "A Generational Shift in Filmmaking", Richard Brody of The New Yorker wrote "McKenzie fuses a documentary-like observational precision with a creative imagination that endows her characters' struggles with a quietly monumental grandeur."

In less enthusiastic reviews, Linda Barnard of the Toronto Star wrote that "McKenzie has effectively drawn us in, although lack of narrative makes the film frustratingly slow in spots," and Joe Leydon of Variety wrote that "the familiarity and predictability of its scenario about co-dependency in the lower depths make the relatively short Canadian indie seem longer than it is."

=== Accolades ===
At the 2016 Atlantic Film Festival, Werewolf won several awards, including Best Director (McKenzie), Best Actress (MacNeil), and Best Actor (Gillis). On 16 October 2016, the film won the Focus Canada Grand Prize at the Festival du nouveau cinema in Montreal. On 7 December 2016, the film was named to TIFF's annual "Canada's Top 10" list. At the 5th Canadian Screen Awards, the film received nominations for Best Actor, Best Actress, Best Cinematography, and Best Editing.

In 2017, Werewolf won the $100,000 Toronto Film Critics Association prize for best Canadian film of the year.

Award	Date of ceremony	Category	Recipient(s)	Result	Ref(s)
Atlantic Film Festival	15–22 September 2016	Best Director	Ashley McKenzie	Won	
Atlantic Film Festival	15–22 September 2016	Best Actress	Bhreagh MacNeil	Won	
Canadian Screen Awards	12 March 2017	Best Actor	Andrew Gillis	Nominated	
Canadian Screen Awards	12 March 2017	Best Actress	Bhreagh MacNeil	Nominated	
Canadian Screen Awards	12 March 2017	Best Cinematography	Scott Moore	Nominated	
Canadian Screen Awards	12 March 2017	Best Editing	Ashley McKenzie	Nominated	
Vancouver Film Critics Circle	16 December 2016	Best First Film by a Canadian Director	Ashley McKenzie	Won	
Vancouver Film Critics Circle	16 December 2016	Best Actress in a Canadian Film	Bhreagh MacNeil	Won	
Toronto Film Critics Association	10 December 2017	Best Canadian Film	Ashley McKenzie, Nelson MacDonald	Won	
