= Ashley McKenzie (director) =

Canadian director and screenwriter

- Born: 1984 (age 41–42)
- Occupations: Film director, screenwriter, editor
- Years active: 2010–present

Ashley McKenzie (born 1984) is a Canadian director, screenwriter, and editor. She is known for her feature film directorial debut Werewolf (2016), which won numerous accolades, including the $100,000 Toronto Film Critics Association prize for best Canadian film of the year. She began her career making short films, including Rhonda's Party (2010), which won the CBC's Short Film Face-Off in 2011.

== Early life ==
McKenzie was born on Cape Breton Island and raised in New Waterford, Nova Scotia.

== Career ==
McKenzie began her career making short films in 2010. Her first short film, Rhonda's Party (2010), won the CBC's Short Film Face-Off in 2011 and was named to the Toronto International Film Festival's annual year-end Canada's Top Ten list. Her second short film, When You Sleep (2012), won the award for Best Atlantic Emerging Director at the 2012 Atlantic Film Festival, and screened at the Cannes Film Festival in Telefilm Canada's short film showcase. Her third short film, Stray, was released in 2013 and her fourth film, 4 Quarters (2015), won Best Atlantic Short at the 2015 Atlantic Film Festival.

For her short film work, McKenzie has won the National Screen Institute's Shaw Media Fearless Female Director Award three times, in 2013, 2014, and 2015.

McKenzie made her feature film directorial debut with Werewolf (2016), a film about two drug addicts in Cape Breton. Werewolf premiered at the Toronto International Film Festival and has since won several awards; at the 2016 Atlantic Film Festival, Werewolf won the awards for Best Director (McKenzie), Best Actress (MacNeil), and Best Actor (Gillis). At the 5th Canadian Screen Awards, McKenzie was nominated for the Canadian Screen Award for Best Achievement in Editing. Gillis was nominated for Best Actor and MacNeil was nominated for Best Actress. In 2016, for her work on the film, McKenzie won the Stella Artois Jay Scott Prize. The following year, after its theatrical release, Werewolf won the $100,000 Toronto Film Critics Association prize for best Canadian film of the year.

Her second feature film, Queens of the Qing Dynasty, premiered at the 2022 Berlin Film Festival.

== Personal life ==
McKenzie has said in an interview with Xtra Magazine that she identifies as being on the asexual spectrum.

== Artistry ==
Joe Leydon of Variety described McKenzie's directing style as having "borderline Bressonian austerity." In an article called "A Generational Shift in Filmmaking", in discussing Werewolf, Richard Brody of The New Yorker wrote that "McKenzie fuses a documentary-like observational precision with a creative imagination that endows her characters' struggles with a quietly monumental grandeur."

== Accolades ==
Year	Association	Category	Nominated work	Result
2016	Atlantic Film Festival	Best Director	Werewolf	Won
2017	Vancouver Film Critics Circle	Best Director of a Canadian Film	Werewolf	Nominated
2017	Vancouver Film Critics Circle	Best Screenplay for a Canadian Film	Werewolf	Nominated
2017	Canadian Screen Awards	Best Achievement in Editing	Werewolf	Nominated
2017	Toronto Film Critics Association	Best Canadian Film	Werewolf	Won
