= Bones season 8 =

Bones
- Season 8
- Season 8 DVD cover art
- No. of episodes: 24

Release
- Original network: Fox
- Original release: September 17, 2012 – April 29, 2013

Season chronology
- ← Previous; Season 7 Next → Season 9

The eighth season of the American television series Bones premiered on September 17, 2012, and concluded on April 29, 2013, on Fox. The show maintained its previous time slot, airing on Mondays at 8:00 pm ET, and consists of 24 episodes. Fox ordered an additional two episodes, that were produced during the eighth season, but aired during the first part of season nine.

== Cast and characters ==
=== Main cast ===
- Emily Deschanel as Dr. Temperance "Bones" Brennan, a forensic anthropologist
- David Boreanaz as FBI Special Agent Seeley Booth, who is the official FBI liaison with the Jeffersonian
- Michaela Conlin as Angela Montenegro, a forensic artist and wife of Jack Hodgins
- Tamara Taylor as Dr. Camille Saroyan, a forensic pathologist and the head of the forensic division
- T. J. Thyne as Dr. Jack Hodgins, an entomologist, mineralogist, palynologist, and forensic chemist, and husband of Angela Montenegro
- John Francis Daley as Dr. Lance Sweets, an FBI psychologist who provides psychological reports on criminals and staff including Brennan and Booth

=== Recurring cast ===
- Patricia Belcher as Caroline Julian, a prosecutor that often works with the team
- Andrew Leeds as Christopher Pelant, a hacker who was previously under house arrest and framed Brennan for murder; he is currently a fugitive wanted by the FBI
- Reed Diamond as Hayes Flynn, an FBI special agent
- Ryan O'Neal as Max Keenan, Brennan's father
- Danielle Panabaker as Olivia Sparling, a rookie FBI special agent
- Joanna Cassidy as Marianne Booth, Seeley's mother
- Tiffany Hines as Michelle Welton, Cam's adopted daughter
- Cyndi Lauper as Avalon Harmonia, a psychic
- Scott Lowell as Dr. Douglas Filmore, a Canadian podiatrist
- Danny Woodburn as Alex Radziwill, a Diplomatic immunity and State Department official

Interns

- Eugene Byrd as Dr. Clark Edison
- Luke Kleintank as Finn Abernathy
- Michael Grant Terry as Wendell Bray
- Pej Vahdat as Arastoo Vaziri
- Carla Gallo as Daisy Wick
- Joel David Moore as Colin Fisher
- Brian Klugman as Dr. Oliver Wells

== Production ==
The series was renewed for an eighth season on March 29, 2012. Executive producer Stephen Nathan commented that season eight would include storylines that were originally intended for the previous season but could not be used then due to its reduced episode count. Twenty-two episodes were produced during season eight, with the extra four episodes ordered by Fox for the previous season incorporated into season eight, making a total of 26 episodes. In March 2013, it was reported that only 24 of the 26 episodes would air in season eight, as the two other episodes would be filmed after the season eight finale, and would be aired during the beginning of the ninth season. Series creator Hart Hanson believed the show could last another two seasons (seasons 9 and 10), saying "we're very, very confident in having at least a season 9, and I can see as far as season 10 before my eyes get misty."

== Episodes ==
No. overall	No. in season	Title	Directed by	Written by	Original release date	Prod. code	US viewers (millions)
143	1	"The Future in the Past"	Ian Toynton	Hart Hanson & Stephen Nathan	September 17, 2012	8AKY01	7.98
Three months have passed since Brennan went into hiding after being framed for murder by Christopher Pelant (Andrew Leeds). Booth has been demoted to desk duty while Cam and her team are still reeling from Brennan's absence. The Jeffersonian team, with Angela's help, catches a break with the discovery of the body of Pelant's old guidance counselor and, with Brennan's help, they learn Pelant killed her and Brennan is cleared of the murder charge. Pelant is arrested but manages to escape from the FBI using unorthodox means.
144	2	"The Partners in the Divorce"	Allison Liddi-Brown	Michael Peterson	September 24, 2012	8AKY02	7.61
The Jeffersonian team investigates the murder of a ruthless divorce lawyer who made several enemies in the past. Meanwhile, Brennan tries to get back into her old routine after being on the run for three months, and tensions mount between her and Booth due to their separation.
145	3	"The Gunk in the Garage"	Kate Woods	Jonathan Collier	October 1, 2012	7AKY15	6.99
When the Jeffersonian team investigates the murder of a man in an explosion, they find that the victim has a twin, complicating the investigation. Meanwhile, Booth is taken off field duty to work on getting the department's budget approved, possibly leading to a promotion. Sweets and a rookie FBI agent (Danielle Panabaker) instead lead the investigation.
146	4	"The Tiger in the Tale"	Dwight Little	Dean Lopata	October 8, 2012	8AKY03	7.20
The Jeffersonian team investigates the death of Jared Drew, an animal expo employee, and in the course of their investigation into his death, they enter the world of illegal animal trafficking. Meanwhile, Brennan thinks she would make an excellent presidential candidate, and Sweets and Daisy take on a big change in their relationship.
147	5	"The Method in the Madness"	Kate Woods	Keith Foglesong	November 5, 2012	8AKY04	7.30
The Jeffersonian team investigates the death of a woman whose body was found mutilated and discarded in a city garbage can. Meanwhile, Booth invites Sweets to stay with Brennan and him while Sweets searches for a new apartment, and Angela questions why she is using her artistic talent reconstructing the faces of dead people instead of following her passion.
148	6	"The Patriot in Purgatory"	François Velle	Stephen Nathan	November 12, 2012	7AKY14	6.96
After being inspired by basketball coach Phil Jackson, Brennan calls together the interns for a team building exercise to identify bones at the Jeffersonian that have remained unidentified for years. They soon discover the remains of one unidentified man who was found near the Pentagon days after the September 11 attacks. All of the Jeffersonian forensic team come together to help solve the case. When Booth realizes that the victim was a fellow Gulf War veteran who had become homeless and was thought to have gone missing, he is determined to find the identity of the victim and bring the family some closure.
149	7	"The Bod in the Pod"	Tim Southam	Pat Charles	November 19, 2012	8AKY05	7.11
Booth and Brennan investigate how a crime-scene cleaner’s body washed to shore inside a sealed pod. The Jeffersonian team pit their wits against their prime suspect, who also happens to be an experienced crime scene cleaner. Back at the lab, Angela and Hodgins discover Cam has been keeping a secret, a romance with a special someone.
150	8	"The But in the Joke"	Ian Toynton	Keith Foglesong	November 26, 2012	7AKY13	7.96
A street artist, who is covertly plastering his art on a billboard, falls and lands directly into his own glue – and into human remains. So the team must not only figure out the identity of the remains, but must also find a strategic way to remove the part of the corpse that is still glued to the street artist. Meanwhile, Booth tries his hand at a comedy club’s "open mic" night in order to seek out potential suspects and Angela’s love of art leads her to become attracted to the street artist.
151	9	"The Ghost in the Machine"	Milan Cheylov	Hart Hanson	December 3, 2012	7AKY17	7.29
This episode is told and filmed from the point of view of the deceased victim. Everyone at the Jeffersonian begins wondering about life and death when the remains of a 14-year-old boy are found in a greenhouse. Angela calls upon Avalon Harmonia (Cyndi Lauper) when she believes that Avalon could help find out who murdered the young boy but, when Avalon arrives, everyone believes that she shouldn't be there; she later returns saying that she believes he's sad. Avalon finds that the young boy was set to have a good future, and she vows to help him make the journey to the afterlife. Brennan begins to worry about Booth when he continues to believe the murderer is Colin's father. Brennan brings Colin home in hopes of finding something to solve the case. The team finds that Colin's death was an accident, after he was riding on the hood of a car, and his friends decided not to tell and, instead, hide the body. The team, with Avalon, play a video Colin made for the girl he loved.
152	10	"The Diamond in the Rough"	Alex Chapple	Nkechi Okoro Carroll	January 14, 2013	8AKY06	8.04
Booth and Brennan go undercover in their previously used identities as "Buck and Wanda Moosejaw" (which they first used in the season 4 episode "Double Trouble in the Panhandle") at a ballroom dancing competition TV show when a contestant is found murdered, with jewels stuck to the body's bones. At the Jeffersonian, Hodgins and Wendell have difficulty removing the crystals from the bones, while Angela questions her career, hoping to revive her past as an artist.
153	11	"The Archaeologist in the Cocoon"	Jeannot Szwarc	Sanford Golden & Karen Wyscarver	January 14, 2013	8AKY07	7.79
Brennan and the team work on unraveling an archaeologist who seems to have been spun into a cocoon around a tree branch. He wrote novels on sensational topics and sold the items pertaining to the topic of his books for a price. Brennan and Edison compete on who will get to analyze bones that seem to indicate that they could be the victims of the world's first hate crime. Meanwhile, Brennan decides to curb her bad habits for the fear that her daughter Christine will inherit them.
154	12	"The Corpse on the Canopy"	Rob Hardy	Jonathan Collier	January 21, 2013	8AKY09	8.53
Hodgins and Angela wake up to find a corpse in their bedroom, after being drugged. The personal attack on the team and Egyptian flower petals near their son makes them believe that Pelant is back. Despite Hodgins' desire to hunt Pelant down immediately and directly, Booth calls a closed-doors investigation and places the Jeffersonian on lock-down while the team is forced to use analog technology and not computers, to avoid being hacked by Pelant, as they try to figure out Pelant's next move. Booth and the FBI eventually catch Pelant, but he is able to escape, although he is wounded by a gunshot from Booth. Before the FBI gets to him, Pelant manages to hack and take control of a MQ-9 aimed at a school full of children in Afghanistan and hacks into all of Hodgins' bank accounts, forcing Hodgins to choose between his fortune or the schoolchildren. Pelant is later seen sewing his own wounds, having sustained serious wounds to his face and right eye from Booth's shot, at a vet clinic with a dead body nearby.
155	13	"The Twist in the Plot"	Milan Cheylov	Kim Clements	January 28, 2013	8AKY08	9.25
Booth and Brennan investigate two corpses found at the same burial site. The identifications reveal one was a terminal cancer patient and the other her doula, hired to help her process her diagnosis and the end of her life. The case causes Booth and Brennan to confront their individual and very different after-death arrangements. Back at the lab, Daisy returns to work her first case since her break-up with Sweets.
156	14	"The Doll in the Derby"	Tawnia McKiernan	Michael Peterson	February 4, 2013	8AKY10	9.06
Angela goes undercover as a roller derby skater after one of the skaters is found dismembered. Meanwhile, Booth secretly does charity work for children with Neurofibromatosis (NF), and Wendell celebrates his 29th birthday.
157	15	"The Shot in the Dark"	François Velle	Dave Thomas	February 11, 2013	8AKY11	8.82
Brennan is shot while working on a case late at night at the Jeffersonian, after having an argument with Booth at home. She is rushed to the hospital after Booth returns to the Jeffersonian and discovers her unconscious and gravely wounded. FBI Agent Olivia Sparling is brought in to assist the investigation. The Jeffersonian team is left dumbfounded by the lack of any bullets or an exit wound in Brennan. Meanwhile, while in surgery, Brennan hallucinates that she converses with her deceased mother (Brooke Langton).
158	16	"The Friend in Need"	Jeffrey Walker	Dean Lopata	February 18, 2013	8AKY12	8.47
The Jeffersonian team investigate the death of a teenage boy whose remains are found inside a suitcase. Although his family describe him as a shy, innocent boy, Booth and Brennan discover he was involved with illegal activity and was present at a high school party where a girl was raped. Meanwhile, Cam's daughter Michelle is back in town, but wants to keep it a secret from Cam; however, her boyfriend, Jeffersonian intern Finn, is uncomfortable keeping it from Cam.
159	17	"The Fact in the Fiction"	Dwight Little	Keith Foglesong	February 25, 2013	8AKY13	8.77
The Jeffersonian sees the addition of a new intern, Dr. Oliver Wells, who is very intelligent and whose personality clashes with the rest of team, especially Dr. Brennan. His more open-minded look at the investigation, including the possibility of time travel, causes Brennan to rethink her narrow-minded observations.
160	18	"The Survivor in the Soap"	Tim Southam	Nkechi Okoro Carroll	March 4, 2013	8AKY14	8.41
The Jeffersonian team investigates the death of Symchay Conteh, a young man whose remains were found in a barrel at a hazardous waste disposal facility. They discover that the victim was an immigrant and child soldier from war-torn Sierra Leone who was granted asylum in the United States as a young teenager in order to start a new life. The case gets personal for intern Arastoo, who sympathizes with the victim as he and his family had fled Iran during the chaos of the Revolution and the Iran–Iraq War. Booth, Sweets and Brennan are confronted by the horrors of the Sierra Leone Civil War as they interview a traumatized war photographer and try to find Conteh's friend, who had fled Sierra Leone and is in the US illegally. Meanwhile, Cam and Arastoo reveal their secret relationship to the Jeffersonian team. Brennan and Booth discuss their vacation plans.
161	19	"The Doom in the Gloom"	Kate Woods	Sanford Golden & Karen Wyscarver	March 18, 2013	8AKY15	7.58
The death of a former female Marine sergeant whose remains are found charred due to an explosion leads Booth and Sweets to a group of doomsday preppers, of which the victim Deanna was a member. Meanwhile, Sweets finally finds an apartment and moves out of Booth and Brennan's home.
162	20	"The Blood from the Stones"	François Velle	Pat Charles	March 25, 2013	8AKY16	6.96
An undercover cop is found murdered with a bag of diamonds hidden inside his body. The cop had been investigating ATM robberies, and the Jeffersonian team investigates to determine whether the ATM robbers also murdered the undercover officer. Meanwhile, the Jeffersonian is the subject of a documentary by Andrew Jursic (Dave Thomas), to help raise money. While filming, Brennan worries she does not have a likable personality and Jursic shows an interest in Caroline Julian.
163	21	"The Maiden in the Mushrooms"	Jeannot Szwarc	Lyla Oliver	April 1, 2013	8AKY17	7.05
A body is found by treasure hunters under a patch of soil coated with mushrooms, the body is later discovered to be a woman who was a TV producer for a reality court show called Judge Trudy. Meanwhile, Brennan is concerned when she finds out her daughter Christine has bitten another child at daycare and Brennan is determined to find proof that a false assumption was made. Also, when Hodgins eats the last remnants of Finn's late grandmother's special hot sauce, he tries to chemically recreate the sauce.
164	22	"The Party in the Pants"	Reggie Hudlin	Michael Peterson & Keith Foglesong	April 15, 2013	8AKY18	6.56
A stockbroker moonlighting as a stripper is found at a construction site. This leads to many awkward conversations around the lab and Bones' surprising (and blunt) opinions about "exotic dancers". Meanwhile, Booth's mom (Joanna Cassidy) shows up after 24 years to invite him to her wedding.
165	23	"The Pathos in the Pathogens"	Chad Lowe	Kim Clements	April 22, 2013	8AKY19	7.06
An ordinary murder case escalates into possible bioterrorism when the CDC brings in a body discovered at a biohazard disposal facility is found to have been infected with an unknown and potentially lethal virus. When Arastoo accidentally comes into contact with the remains, the team find themselves in unfamiliar territory as they work around the clock to identify the virus and solve the murder to prevent an outbreak.
166	24	"The Secret in the Siege"	David Boreanaz	Stephen Nathan & Jonathan Collier	April 29, 2013	8AKY20	7.36
Pelant returns, and Brennan begins to re-evaluate her relationship with Booth when evidence emerges that he could be Pelant's latest target after a series of murders are revealed to be connected to FBI agents with ties to Booth. Brennan surprises Booth under a gazebo and proposes. Sweets warns Booth that he and Brennan getting engaged with Pelant active could cause him to escalate. Angela determines that Pelant has access to every security camera with an internet connection. Later, Booth and Brennan are at a park with Christine. Booth receives a threatening phone call from Pelant stating that Booth won't marry Brennan because he (Pelant) will kill five innocent people. Booth tells him that he will find him and kill him; Pelant says that Booth has already tried. Pelant states that he has read everything Sweets has written about Booth and Brennan and that he knows Booth could never trade five innocent lives for his own happiness. Booth tells Pelant that he will kill him. That call causes Booth to withdraw accepting Brennan's marriage proposal as he fears telling her the truth will endanger her and Christine. Brennan acts stoically, but leaves the room very sad.

== DVD and Blu-ray release ==
The eighth season of Bones was released on DVD and Blu-ray (subtitled "Once Upon a Crime Edition") in region 1 on October 8, 2013, in region 2 on September 30, 2013, and in region 4 on November 20, 2013. The set includes all 24 episodes of season eight on a 6-disc DVD set and 5-disc Blu-ray set presented in anamorphic widescreen. Special features include an audio commentary on "The Future in the Past" by Hart Hanson, Stephen Nathan and Ian Toynton, deleted scenes from "The Patriot in Purgatory", "The Survivor in the Soap" and "The Party in the Pants", a gag reel, and two featurettes—Dying to Know: Bones Answers Your Questions! and Bare Bones: Total Fandom-onium.
