= Bones season 9 =

Bones
- Season 9
- Season 9 DVD cover art
- No. of episodes: 24

Release
- Original network: Fox
- Original release: September 16, 2013 – May 19, 2014

Season chronology
- ← Previous; Season 8 Next → Season 10

The ninth season of the American television series Bones premiered on September 16, 2013, and concluded on May 19, 2014, on Fox. The show maintained its previous time slot, airing on Mondays at 8:00 pm ET, then moved to Fridays at 8:00 pm starting November 15, 2013, and returned to Mondays at 8:00 pm beginning March 10, 2014. The season consists of 24 episodes.

== Cast and characters ==
=== Main cast ===
- Emily Deschanel as Dr. Temperance "Bones" Brennan, a forensic anthropologist, and wife of Seeley Booth
- David Boreanaz as FBI Special Agent Seeley Booth, who is the official FBI liaison with the Jeffersonian, and husband of Temperance Brennan
- Michaela Conlin as Angela Montenegro, a forensic artist and wife of Jack Hodgins
- Tamara Taylor as Dr. Camille Saroyan, a forensic pathologist and the head of the forensic division
- T. J. Thyne as Dr. Jack Hodgins, an entomologist, mineralogist, palynologist, and forensic chemist, and husband of Angela Montenegro
- John Francis Daley as Dr. Lance Sweets, an FBI psychologist who provides psychological reports on criminals and staff including Brennan and Booth

=== Recurring cast ===
- Patricia Belcher as Caroline Julian, a prosecutor who often works with the team
- Mather Zickel as Aldo Clemens, an ex-priest who counseled Booth when he was a sniper
- Sunnie Pelant as Christine Booth, Seeley and Temperance's daughter
- Andrew Leeds as Christopher Pelant, a hacker and fugitive wanted by the FBI
- Ryan O'Neal as Max Keenan, Brennan's father
- Eileen Grubba as Donna Hastings, the gardener for the McNamaras, a family being targeted by the ghost killer
- Sterling Macer, Jr. as Victor Stark, the FBI Deputy Director
- Freddie Prinze, Jr. as Danny Beck, a covert CIA agent
- Joanna Cassidy as Marianne Booth, Seeley's mother
- Reed Diamond as FBI Special Agent Hayes Flynn, Booth's colleague
- Tiffany Hines as Michelle Welton, Cam's adopted daughter
- Cyndi Lauper as Avalon Harmonia, a psychic
- Scott Lowell as Dr. Douglas Filmore, a Canadian podiatrist
- Ty Panitz as Parker Booth, Booth's son
- Jonno Roberts as Jeffrey Hodgins, Dr. Jack Hodgins older brother
- Ralph Waite as Hank Booth, Seeley's grandfather

Interns

- Eugene Byrd as Dr. Clark Edison
- Carla Gallo as Daisy Wick
- Michael Grant Terry as Wendell Bray
- Pej Vahdat as Arastoo Vaziri
- Brian Klugman as Dr. Oliver Wells
- Joel David Moore as Colin Fisher
- Luke Kleintank as Finn Abernathy
- Ignacio Serricchio as Rodolfo Fuentes
- Laura Spencer as Jessica Warren

== Production ==
The series was renewed for a ninth season on January 9, 2013. The season features two extra episodes that were produced during the eighth season, but were not aired; they aired during the first half of season nine. Recurring antagonist Christopher Pelant (Andrew Leeds) returned for two episodes, which concluded his multiple-episode arc. New recurring characters in the season include Danny Beck, played by Freddie Prinze, Jr., a covert CIA agent who is an old associate of Booth; and Aldo Clemens, played by Mather Zickel, who served as Booth's advisor when he was a sniper. Both characters first appeared in the season premiere. The season also introduces new recurring Jeffersonian intern Rodolfo Fuentes, played by Ignacio Serricchio, who is a Cuban forensic anthropologist seeking asylum in the U.S.

== Episodes ==
No. overall	No. in season	Title	Directed by	Written by	Original release date	Prod. code	US viewers (millions)
167	1	"The Secrets in the Proposal"	Ian Toynton	Hart Hanson & Stephen Nathan	September 16, 2013	9AKY01	7.76
The remains of a State Department accountant are found in a hotel's air-conditioning unit, but the investigation takes an unusual turn when Booth discovers that an old Army pal, CIA Special Agent Danny Beck (Freddie Prinze, Jr.), is also looking for clues. Meanwhile, Booth seeks advice from a friend, a former priest who runs a bar, about his relationship with Brennan, who is uncertain about their future together due to Pelant's threat about killing five people innocents and about rejecting Brennan's proposal to marry.
168	2	"The Cheat in the Retreat"	Alex Chapple	Nkechi Okoro Carroll	September 23, 2013	9AKY02	6.74
Booth and Brennan go undercover as "Tony" and "Roxie" (their undercover personas from season 2's "The Woman in the Sand") at a marriage retreat site when evidence from the murder of a management consultant leads there. Meanwhile, Cam is the victim of identity theft and Sweets decides to take a leave of absence after feeling disconnected from his work.
169	3	"El Carnicero en el Coche"	Ian Toynton	Jonathan Collier & Dean Lopata	September 30, 2013	8AKY22	7.26
Sweets temporarily returns from his sabbatical to assist the Jeffersonian team investigate the murder of a Mexican gang member, after he discovers that one of the young kids he has been volunteering with is a son of a gang member.
170	4	"The Sense in the Sacrifice"	Kate Woods	Jonathan Collier	October 7, 2013	9AKY03	7.30
The Jeffersonian team use a cadaver to stage a murder in a way that mimics how Christopher Pelant would, hoping to draw him out. Pelant figures this out and in turn murders FBI agent Hayes Flynn, who helped the Jeffersonian team set up the staged murder scene. Pelant is able to sneak into the Jeffersonian and tells Brennan that several unsolved murders were done by a female serial killer, and only he can help her solve them. Using evidence from Flynn's murder, Brennan tracks Pelant to an abandoned power plant. When Booth arrives, Pelant has Brennan and is threatening to blow up the plant, but Booth is able to shoot and kill Pelant. With Pelant now dead, Booth proposes to Brennan, who accepts.
171	5	"The Lady on the List"	Chad Lowe	Pat Charles	October 14, 2013	9AKY04	7.30
A man is found on a cliff side, hanging from climbing gear and has been partly eaten by a nearby hawk. After being diagnosed with cancer he began a very profitable business selling self-help videos online. The case takes a different turn when Angela discovers a video of him punching martial artist Chuck Liddell. Sweets is back permanently but is less than pleased when Booth shows him VAL, a new computerized profiling system his department recently acquired for him. Back at the lab, Dr. Wells continues to irritate and impress Cam with both his tactlessness and brilliance. Meanwhile, Brennan and Booth plan their wedding.
172	6	"The Woman in White"	Kevin Hooks	Karine Rosenthal	October 21, 2013	9AKY05	7.60
During Booth and Brennan's wedding rehearsal, they receive a call that a body has been discovered. The rest of the Jeffersonian team try to keep the details of the investigation from Brennan so she can focus on her wedding. Cam enlists the interns to solve the case. After the church they were going to get married in was burned down, Angela plans a new wedding. Booth and Brennan are married in the rose gardens of the Jeffersonian, with several family and friends in attendance, including Brennan's father, Booth's mother, grandfather, and son.
173	7	"The Nazi on the Honeymoon"	Jeannot Szwarc	Dave Thomas	November 4, 2013	9AKY06	6.97
Brennan and Booth spend their honeymoon in Buenos Aires, but end up helping with a local murder investigation. They assist Raphael Valenza (Joaquim de Almeida), a local detective and fan of Brennan's novels (which are very popular in Argentina), in solving the murder of a Nazi war criminal whose remains were found in a historic mass grave. Meanwhile, Angela and Hodgins take care of Christine while Brennan and Booth are away and discuss having a second child.
174	8	"The Dude in the Dam"	Kevin Hooks	Kathy Reichs & Kerry Reichs	November 11, 2013	8AKY21	7.35
The Jeffersonian team investigates the murder of Sean Nolan, a failed model whose body is found intertwined in a beaver dam. The team soon discovers that Nolan's fruitless modeling career left his sperm donations as his only source of income. However, when the team learns that he falsified records, they start to suspect anyone who was jilted by his donations. Meanwhile, Brennan struggles with social niceties and tact when she is drawn into a feud with author Tess Brown (Nora Dunn) and Hodgins gets in touch with his motherly instincts when he plays host to a fly larva.
175	9	"The Fury in the Jury"	Dwight Little	Sanford Golden & Karen Wyscarver	November 15, 2013	9AKY07	5.18
Brennan serves as a juror on a case in which a professional soccer player, Peter Kidman, is accused of murdering his wife. The jury renders a not guilty verdict due to no evidence tying him to the murder. However, when the Jeffersonian team receive a body that turns out to be Kidman's best friend, who was planning on changing his testimony in the trial that would have helped convict Kidman, Brennan rejoins the team and they try and prove that Kidman killed his wife and best friend. Meanwhile, Angela discovers who is behind Cam's identity theft, and Cam identifies her as her old college roommate.
176	10	"The Mystery in the Meat"	Tim Southam	Michael Peterson	November 22, 2013	9AKY08	5.78
The Jeffersonian team investigate the murder of a food scientist whose remains were discovered throughout several cans of stew that were served at a school cafeteria. Meanwhile, Angela, Brennan, Cam, Caroline, and Daisy go out for Brennan's post-wedding bachelorette party, leaving Hodgins and intern Oliver to continue to solve the case.
177	11	"The Spark in the Park"	Chad Lowe	Emily Silver	December 6, 2013	9AKY09	6.91
The Jeffersonian team investigate the murder of a young woman who was a highly skilled gymnast. Her remains were hit by lightning and scattered throughout a park. Several fellow gymnasts are suspects as the victim was nationally ranked No. 1. Meanwhile, Cam comes face-to-face with her former college roommate, who stole her identity and who has been brought in by the FBI. Olympic gymnast McKayla Maroney guest stars.
178	12	"The Ghost in the Killer"	Allison Liddi-Brown	Nkechi Okoro Carroll	January 10, 2014	9AKY10	6.88
Bones has nightmares about what Pelant told her about the female serial killer, "The Ghost Killer". Remains of a girl named Lana Brewster are left at Booth and Brennan's doorstep with a note saying to solve her murder. The dreams start to interfere with her job and Cam gives the remains to Clark. Brennan becomes obsessed with the Ghost Killer and believes the murder of Lana is connected to the Ghost Killer. One of the suspects, Trent McNamara, an old childhood friend of Hodgins, is found in his home having supposedly committed suicide.
179	13	"Big in the Philippines"	David Boreanaz	Keith Foglesong	January 17, 2014	9AKY11	6.78
The remains of country singer-songwriter Colin Haynes (Charlie Worsham) are found in a garden. After Wendell breaks his arm in a hockey game, Brennan and Cam examine his X-rays and discover that he has a rare form of bone cancer, known as Ewing's sarcoma.
180	14	"The Master in the Slop"	Dwight Little	Dave Thomas	January 24, 2014	9AKY12	7.49
When a famous chess master is found in pig slop, Sweets goes undercover at a chess club to investigate. The prime suspect proves to be challenging and Sweets and Booth each lend their unique perspectives in order to extract a confession. Meanwhile, Cam receives an award but is hesitant to take it unless both Brennan and Angela are honored as well. Dr. Douglas Filmore, a Canadian forensic podiatrist, returns to serve as the case's intern.
181	15	"The Heiress in the Hill"	Milan Cheylov	Dean Lopata	January 31, 2014	9AKY13	6.78
The remains of a kidnap victim are found buried at a park. Hodgins learns a secret about his family which both excites and distresses him, he has a brother. Booth and Brennan discuss how to handle their finances after Brennan receives a $75,000 advance from her book sales and asks a reluctant Booth to cash the check and decide what to do with it.
182	16	"The Source in the Sludge"	Ian Toynton	Jonathan Collier	March 10, 2014	9AKY14	6.55
A victim is found stuffed in a duffel bag floating in a lake. Booth reunites with his old friend CIA Agent Danny Beck after discovering that the victim is a female Afghani refugee and informant whom Beck had helped gain political asylum in the United States. Brennan and Booth have a disagreement when she learns that her insurance company is charging her a higher premium as they deemed her more "at risk" when out in the field compared to Booth and she plans to challenge it. Back at the lab, Daisy seems to be under the weather and is unable to concentrate.
183	17	"The Repo Man in the Septic Tank"	Jeffrey Walker	Michael Peterson	March 17, 2014	9AKY15	5.63
The corpse of a missing repo man with a troubled past is found in a septic tank. The Jeffersonian gets a new Cuban intern Rodolfo Fuentes (Ignacio Serricchio), who attempts to charm the ladies, much to Booth's ire. Booth and Brennan discuss whether or not Christine should be given a religious upbringing.
184	18	"The Carrot in the Kudzu"	Rob Hardy	Sanford Golden & Karen Wyscarver	March 24, 2014	9AKY16	5.82
An actor from a popular children's television show is found murdered and his corpse covered in kudzu. Clark has written a new fiction novel and asks his colleagues for their opinions. Booth and Brennan discuss party plans for Christine's first birthday party.
185	19	"The Turn in the Urn"	Tim Southam	Pat Charles	March 31, 2014	9AKY17	5.72
When a man who collects artifacts attends his own funeral, the team must determine who was cremated in his place, leading to the discovery of a possible multiple murderer. Much to their delight, Finn and Hodgins' hot sauce business takes off, but happiness is short-lived when Michelle returns to Washington DC with distressing news for Finn.
186	20	"The High in the Low"	Anne Renton	Keith Fogelsong	April 7, 2014	9AKY18	6.58
Remains found in a log in Great Falls Park belong to an art school dropout suffering from lupus who was using marijuana to ease her pain, but evidence suggests that her death is linked to her work at a dispensary. Meanwhile, Wendell reveals information about his illness which may cost him his job and Booth gets ready for his yearly FBI competency test.
187	21	"The Cold in the Case"	Milan Cheylov	Emily Silver	April 14, 2014	9AKY19	5.79
A woman's remains are found in a swamp. The case takes a bizarre twist when the team discovers that the victim was cryogenically frozen before her death. Meanwhile, Cam is nervous about meeting Arastoo's parents and Booth may be up for a promotion.
188	22	"The Nail in the Coffin"	Ian Toynton	Dean Lopata	April 21, 2014	9AKY20	5.97
The body of Stephanie McNamara, sister of Trent McNamara (from the episode "The Ghost in the Killer"), is found in a swamp. Given the high profile and financial wealth of the McNamara family, the Deputy Director of the FBI takes an interest in the case. The circumstances surrounding Stephanie's death lead the team to believe that the "Ghost Killer" is back. The identity of the murderer is revealed as the McNamara family's decades-long secrets come to light.
189	23	"The Drama in the Queen"	Jeannot Szwarc	Megan McNamara	May 12, 2014	9AKY21	6.38
The body of a college swim coach is uncovered at the bottom of a well. Sweets fills in for Booth, who has to testify at a congressional subcommittee. As he and Brennan sift through the suspects and evidence, they realize that the swim coach has been living a secret life off campus. The Jeffersonian gets a new intern Jessica Warren (Laura Spencer).
190	24	"The Recluse in the Recliner"	David Boreanaz	Stephen Nathan & Jonathan Collier	May 19, 2014	9AKY22	6.04
The charred corpse of a conspiracy blogger is found in his trailer. The case turns out to be much bigger when Booth and the Jeffersonian team uncover a complex web of conspiracies and blackmail involving some of the country's top government and business leaders, including the McNamara family. Classified information from his military service is exposed during Booth's congressional hearing, setting off a series of events which put his career into question. Meanwhile, the "squint squad" race against the clock to find out who is behind the blackmail and targeting Booth.

== DVD release ==
The ninth season of Bones was released on DVD format only (subtitled "Til Death Do Us Part Edition") in region 1 on September 16, 2014, in region 2 on September 15, 2014, and in region 4 on November 26, 2014. The set includes all 24 episodes of season nine on a 6-disc DVD set presented in anamorphic widescreen. Special features include an audio commentary on "The Woman in White" by Hart Hanson, Stephen Nathan and Karine Rosenthal, deleted scenes, a gag reel, and two featurettes—"Walking Down the Aisle, Bones Style" and "Bones at Comic-Con 2013".
