= Lori Lansens =

Canadian novelist and screenwriter (born 1962)

- Born: July 25, 1962 (age 64); Chatham, Ontario
- Occupations: Novelist, screenwriter
- Writing career
- Period: 1990s-present
- Notable works: South of Wawa, Rush Home Road, The Girls

Lori Lansens is a Canadian novelist and screenwriter.

== Profile ==
Lansens, a successful screenwriter, has credits including the films South of Wawa, Wolf Girl and Marine Life, prior to publishing her first novel Rush Home Road in 2002. It was a shortlisted finalist for the Rogers Writers' Trust Fiction Prize.

Lansens' follow-up novel, The Girls, was published in 2005. The Girls received recognition as a 2007 Best Book for Young Adults from the American Library Association. and was longlisted for the Orange Prize in 2007.

She followed up with The Wife's Tale in 2009, and The Mountain Story in 2015. In fall 2019 Lansens published This Little Light, concerning the bombing of a Calabasas Christian school, after which a rebellious young girl is accused of the crime. The novel deals with themes of sex and religion, both common themes for this author.

Originally from Chatham, Ontario, Lansens currently resides in Los Angeles with her husband, television director and producer Milan Cheylov, along with their children. Cheylov is also Canadian born.

== Bibliography ==
- Rush Home Road (2002) ISBN 978-0-307-36328-2
- The Girls (2006) ISBN 978-0-676-97796-7
- The Wife's Tale (2010) ISBN 978-0-307-37304-5
- The Mountain Story (2015) ISBN 978-0-345-80902-5
- This Little Light (2019) ISBN 978-0735276420

== Accolades ==
In 2023 Lansens was inducted into the Chatham-Kent Cultural Hall of Fame for her contributions to the literary arts as a novelist and screenwriter.
