= Two Bodies in the Lab =

- Bones episode
- Episode no.: Season 1 Episode 15
- Directed by: Allan Kroeker
- Written by: Stephen Nathan
- Production code: 1AKY15
- Original air date: March 15, 2006

Guest appearances
- Adam Baldwin as Special Agent James Kenton; Ron Marasco as Lewis Slater; Adam Lieberman as Agent Sanders; Coby Ryan McLaughlin as David Simmons; Greg Ellis as Kevin Hollings

Episode chronology
← Previous "The Man on the Fairway"	Next → "The Woman in the Tunnel"

"Two Bodies in the Lab" is the 15th episode of the first season of the television series, Bones. Originally aired on March 15, 2006 on Fox network, the episode is written by Stephen Nathan and directed by Allan Kroeker. The episode features FBI Special Agent Seeley Booth and Dr. Temperance Brennan's investigation into two murder victims from two different cases.

== Plot ==
Dr. Temperance Brennan organizes a date with a man she recently met online. Her boss, Dr. Daniel Goodman, arrives and tells her that they have a new case — a member of the Cugini family, who was part of the mafia, had been found at the bottom of a river, with cement shoes.

Special Agent Seeley Booth arrives with Special Agent James Kenton, who had been working undercover with the chief suspects for the murder, the Romano family, for two years. Following this, Booth receives a newer and more important case that needs their attention — a female victim who had been tied up and fed to dogs. After Brennan examines the remains of the female victim and deduces the method of killing, Booth tells Brennan of a similar case that he had worked on, and that his prime suspect, Kevin Hollings, had gone free.

Brennan leaves the crime scene to go on her date with the man she had met on the internet, David Simmons. While walking to the restaurant, she is shot at and only avoids being hit by bending over to retrieve her dropped cell phone as the shots are fired. While her colleagues are concerned for her, Brennan refuses to stop work, claiming that the best way to find the murderers would be to have her on the case, and then therefore they would catch her attacker too. Despite Brennan's wishes, Booth brings in her date, David, as a suspect, pointing out he would have known where to find her. While Booth tries to prove that David was the one who organized the attack on Brennan, he is displeased when she seems to be very attracted to David. Booth expresses to Brennan and David his discomfort with the entire "internet thing". Then when Booth says that it is "creepy" to Brennan while David is in the room, David says that he doesn't want to "get in the way of anything", referring to Brennan and Booth, whom he has mistaken for a couple. Shocked at David's misinterpretation of their relationship, both Booth and Brennan set David straight and vehemently deny that there is any attraction between them.

Angela Montenegro manages to identify the victim as Penny Hamilton, a college student, and Brennan attempts to use an experimental method to identify the gun used on the mafia victim. Zack correctly finds one of the knives used on the college student and realizes that the murder weapon had a nick in the blade, making it distinctive.

Booth and Brennan visit the home of the man Booth suspects of the murder of the college girl, Kevin Hollings. They find a knife with no nick on the blade and a collection of thousands of keys. While Hollings refuses to talk, Brennan realizes that the keys could be what was used to gouge out the eyes of the victim and orders a photo of each key to be taken prior to their release to match with the markings on the skull.

Concerned for her safety, Booth accompanies Brennan home. Brennan, however seems surprised at Booth's assertion that he spend the night when he says that he'll sleep on the couch. After some mild objection from Brennan on the subject, the two seem to settle in and begin listening to music on Brennan's CD player. Booth appears taken aback at Brennan's wide array of jazz music, saying that he thought "all that free form stuff might be a little too much for you". Brennan, however, asserts that she actually loves it, and Booth seems surprised at her evident love of music. After that Booth finds a Foreigner CD and begins playing "Hot Blooded"; he begins to dance to it, and after some coaxing, Brennan begins to dance with him. This is seen by many fans as an early bonding moment in their partnership and is seen to contain certain romantic undertones. However, their joviality comes to an end when David calls to check up on Brennan, and Brennan reveals that Booth is with her. After Brennan gets rid of David, Booth seems worried that David might have gotten the wrong impression and could believe that Booth being there was of a more social or even sexual nature than in actuality. Brennan dismisses his worries by saying that it wasn't a problem. Booth breaks the awkward silence that settles in by asking her if she has anything to drink, and when Brennan goes to get it for him, he stops her, saying that he's not her guest, and goes to get it himself. However, when he goes to get the drink from her refrigerator, it explodes, seriously injuring him. Bones grabs the blanket off her couch and puts out the fire on his chest, saving him. After he is taken to the hospital, he assigns Kenton the job of protecting Brennan. The chemicals used in the explosion are identified as belonging to the company for which Hollings works.

Dr. Jack Hodgins visits Booth to update him on the case. Together, they realize that Hollings was being framed and that it must be someone from somewhere within the lab. Just as they realize this, Brennan is kidnapped by Kenton and taken to a warehouse. He ties her up and prepares to kill her in an identical method to how Hollings killed his previous victims, in order to frame him. (It is also implied that Kenton killed Hollings offscreen.)

Booth arrives just in time, shooting Kenton and saving Brennan from certain death. Following the events, Booth returns to the hospital, and the episode closes with Brennan canceling her date in order to spend time with him as he recovers. The two watch The Grapes of Wrath.

== Production ==
During the scene where Booth and Brennan dance to Foreigner's "Hot Blooded", both David Boreanaz, playing Booth, and Emily Deschanel, playing Brennan, wore earphones. However, during filming, one of them fell off Boreanaz. According to Boreanaz in the episode's audio commentary, he admitted that he remembered his words from the script, but struggled to remember them while in the car scenes, so he put the script on the dashboard to remind him what to say next.

== Music ==
The episode featured the following music:

- "Hot Blooded" - Foreigner
- "Walking on Moonlight" - Brookville
- "A Pain That I'm Used To" - Depeche Mode

== Reception ==
On March 15, 2006, Bones was broadcast in the Wednesday 8:00 pm timeslot to be the lead-in program for American Idol. "Two Bodies in the Lab" attracted 12.07 million viewers, placing it first among 18 to 49 years old viewers and second in total viewers behind CBS' Survivor: Panama.
