= Seeley Booth =

- Bones character
- First appearance: September 13, 2005 (1x01, "Pilot")
- Last appearance: March 28, 2017 (12x12, "The End in the End")
- Created by: Hart Hanson
- Portrayed by: David Boreanaz

In-universe information
- Full name: Seeley Joseph Booth
- Aliases: Buck Moosejaw; Tony Scallion; Bobby Kent; Cee-Lo Booth; Freddy K
- Nicknames: Seeley (by his family, friends and others); Booth (by Temperance "Bones" Brennan and others); Shrimp (by Pops); Sergeant, Sarge (by men in his unit); Boothy; G-Man (by Angela); Cher (by Caroline); Big man (by Cam Saroyan); Mr. B (his coma dream); Corporal (200th)
- Gender: Male
- Occupation: FBI Supervisory Special Agent; FBI Liaison to Jeffersonian Institute; FBI Academy instructor (former); Sergeant Major, US Army (former); Prison inmate (briefly); Club owner (his coma dream); Thief (The 200th in the 10th)
- Affiliation: FBI Headquarters; FBI Washington, D.C. Field office Homicide Division; Major Crimes Unit; Jeffersonian Institute; Nightclub "Lab" (his coma dream); FBI Academy (formerly); 101st Airborne Division (former); 75th Ranger Regiment (former); U.S. Army Special Forces (former)
- Family: Grandfather: Hank Booth; Mother: Marianne Booth; Father: Edwin Booth (deceased); Brother: Jared Booth (deceased)
- Spouses: Temperance Brennan (wife; 2013–present); Rebecca Stinson (partner; before show)
- Significant others: Camille Saroyan; Tessa Jankow; Hannah Burley
- Children: Parker Booth (son, with Rebecca; born c. 2001); Christine Booth (daughter, with Temperance; born 2012); Hank Booth Jr. (son, with Temperance; born 2015)
- Relatives: Father-in-law: Max Keenan/Matthew Brennan (deceased); Mother-in-law: Christine Brennan/Ruth Keenan (deceased); Brother-in-law: Russ Brennan; Sister-in-law: Padme Dalaj (formerly); Ancestor: John Wilkes Booth

Seeley Joseph Booth is a fictional character in the American television series Bones (2005–2017), portrayed by David Boreanaz. Agent Booth is the male protagonist of the series. The character made an appearance in the Sleepy Hollow episode "Dead Men Tell No Tales" as part of a two-part Halloween cross-over with Bones.

== Character background and history ==
Booth is from Philadelphia but was raised in Pittsburgh, though another episode indicates he had spent some of his childhood in Buffalo. He is a fan of the Philadelphia Flyers hockey team; he has pictures of the team hanging on the back wall of his office, has been seen wearing a Flyers T-shirt when off-duty and is known to become extremely annoyed whenever he is interrupted while watching a Flyers game. During many episodes he is seen drinking from a Pittsburgh Steelers coffee mug, suggesting he is also a fan of that football team. In his apartment Booth has a Pittsburgh Penguins hockey jersey of Mario Lemieux, which implies he is a fan of the Penguins. He is implied to be a Philadelphia Phillies supporter as well; in season 8, his mother brings his childhood toy – a miniature Phillie Phanatic stuffed toy – to give to Christine and in season 6, episode 16 "The Blackout in the Blizzard" he acquires a row of seats from the former Veterans Stadium and recounts for Dr. Brennan how he attended game 6 of the 1980 World Series with his father, describing it as the "best day of [his] life". A deeply religious man, he was raised and still is a practicing Catholic, having served as an altar boy during his youth; throughout the series he is often seen wearing a St. Christopher medal, which was given to him by his grandfather before being deployed to Somalia, around his neck. Little is known about his schooling years, though it has been implied that he went through the public school system and he once mentioned attending five different schools by the time he was nine. It is not mentioned where or when he attended college but he has stated that he attended on an athletic scholarship before a shoulder injury ended any dreams of going professional and taught dance to help pay for tuition. He has been an avid athlete and sports fan since his high school days. His home and office walls are adorned with various sports memorabilia including a signed picture of Bruins player Bobby Orr and the jerseys of NHL legends Mario Lemieux and Bobby Clarke.

In Season 3 it is stated that Booth is 35 years old and that Brennan is five years younger than him and, in Season 4 episode The Con Man in the Meth Lab, the "squints" celebrate his birthday. In the episode Women in Limbo of season 1, it is stated that Brennan is born in 1976, which should put Booth's birthday in 1971. Booth mentioned in a Season 5 episode ("The X in the File") that he had watched Rocketship 7 as a child, a show that had ended in 1978. In season 11, Booth (and his brother, Jared) are mentioned as now being in their (early) 40s.

=== Family ===
Booth is the older of two boys and has a younger brother Jared (Brendan Fehr). Their father "flew Thuds and Phantoms in Vietnam" and moved to Philadelphia where he worked as a barber and eventually started a family. After his death, Booth found a Purple Heart medal among his possessions, indicating he was likely shot down and injured at some point during the war. Their mother Marianne (Joanna Cassidy) was a dancer and composed jingles for television advertisements. Booth is a (fictional) member of the Anglo-American Booth family, best known for producing generations of actors including John Wilkes Booth, the assassin of Abraham Lincoln; because of the latter, Booth does not like to talk about the fact.

For the first three seasons, details on Booth's family background were generally sketchy as he rarely mentioned his family members. He is still uncomfortable discussing his childhood and becomes especially defensive when asked about it. Prior to Jared's appearance in the episode "The Con Man in the Meth Lab", Booth's long-time friend Dr. Camille Saroyan was the only one who knew about his childhood; in the same episode, Sweets observed the brothers and independently came to the conclusion himself that they were products of a physically abusive household. However, it is not until Season 5 when Booth's grandfather Hank is introduced that his abusive background is fully revealed.

In Season 8, Booth bluntly tells Brennan that he "grew up in a household of violence and hatred", one of the few times the character has ever openly spoken of his past. When his younger brother Jared is first introduced, it becomes apparent that Booth was estranged from his family. Their father was an abusive alcoholic; this was reinforced by the fact that Booth is able to almost instantly recognize suspects with a drinking problem even when they are sober. Booth used to protect Jared from their father when he became violent, and was extremely protective of him. The extent of their father's abuse was never fully revealed but based on Booth's vague admissions throughout the show and Hank and Marianne's own statements, it was likely that he was also emotionally neglectful of his ex-wife and sons. One of Booth's deepest fears and insecurities is that he would become like his father, which continues to trouble him to this day. It is implied that their mother was also subjected to abuse by their father as she once mentioned to Brennan that she was thrown down a flight of stairs by her ex-husband. Eventually she left the family out of desperation. In the Season 8 episode "The Party in the Pants", she contacts Booth for the first time in over two decades to invite him to her wedding. The boys were essentially singlehandedly raised by their paternal grandfather Hank (Ralph Waite), whom Booth affectionately calls "Pops". Hank had stumbled upon his son abusing Seeley and drove him out of the house. He calls Booth "Shrimp" as Seeley was a young child then. From then on, he raised his two grandsons as his own. Booth has admitted that he might have killed himself as a kid had it not been for his grandfather.

=== Military and FBI ===
After losing his athletic scholarship, Booth enlisted in the United States Army. He is at least a third-generation military servicemember—his grandfather, Hank, was an MP veteran of the Korean War and his father was a veteran of the Vietnam War. It is mentioned in season 4 that, prior to Jared's court-martial and dishonorable discharge for stealing evidence to save Booth, "no Booth has ever gotten a dishonorable discharge." Based on facts subsequently revealed throughout the show, he would have served during the 1990s, prior to joining the FBI. He was a sniper in the 101st Airborne Division, 75th Ranger Regiment, and Special Forces. He served in the Gulf War, Somalia, Guatemala, and Kosovo, along with other places. He also stated that he has trained with Delta Force operators and it has been indicated that he has experience in clandestine operations. For a time, he held the record for the longest shot made in combat. In the Season 5 finale, he is shown wearing a 101st Airborne Division combat patch, Ranger and Special Forces qualification tabs, a Combat Infantryman Badge, and Parachutist, Military Free Fall Parachutist, and Air Assault badges. He also has a Pathfinder Badge in his shadow boxes in his office. His achievement and service medals can be seen in the shadow boxes mounted on the wall behind his desk in his office. While in the military, he was awarded a Bronze Star Medal, a Purple Heart, and an Army Good Conduct Medal. He separated from the army at the rank of master sergeant.

In the episode "The Beginning in the End," Booth is approached by a Colonel Pelant and handed a letter from the Secretary of Defense requesting him to return to active duty to train Afghan soldiers at "tracking and apprehending insurgents". He is offered a promotion to sergeant major and a position as an advisor to the Afghan National Army. Although initially reluctant, Booth accepts and is deployed to Afghanistan during the time frame between Seasons 5 and 6 when he, Bones, Angela, and Hodgins leave Washington, D.C. for a year-long sabbatical.

Despite his distinguished service record, Booth is generally reticent about his military service and rarely speaks about it openly, even with Bones. Part of the reason is the classified nature of some his assignments. Bones subsequently discovers that he has been tortured while held as a POW in the Middle East, which Booth never elaborated on and has not been addressed since, after looking at his x-rays. In Season 2, he was kidnapped and tortured with a heated screwdriver by a mobster for refusing to give information and later told Bones that he has been "tortured worse". In Season 9, Bones mentions that he does not throw his socks into the hamper after coming home from work so that his feet stay warm, suggesting that he still suffers from the physical ramifications of the torture he endured. Booth is still haunted by memories from his time in the Army, having lost friends in combat and watched his own buddy bleed to death in his arms. As such, he is noticeably affected when investigating cases involving veterans and was also implied to have stopped attending unit reunions and gatherings in an effort to distance himself from his painful past in the military. It is apparent that he suffers from survivor's guilt, although the term is never used in the show, and his "kill count" is a major sore point and an extremely sensitive issue for him. Former priest and Army chaplain, Aldo Clemens, whom Booth regularly confessed to while he was in the service, told Bones that Booth was the reason why he left the priesthood and decided that God was his "worst enemy" and a "bastard". In the episode "Hero in the Hold," it is revealed that he has blamed himself for the death of his spotter, Corporal Edward "Teddy" Parker (whom Booth named his son after), on a sniper mission, even though Teddy had unintentionally disobeyed orders to keep his head down and was fatally shot as a result. He sought out Sweets for counseling in Season 6 after he was confronted by his former mentor and ex-military sniper-turned-vigilante Jacob Broadsky. Towards the end of Season 1 he confessed to Bones for the first time about the buried guilt of assassinating a man in front of his son, after much persuasion from a fellow veteran, telling her, "It's never just the one person who dies, Bones. [...] With each shot we all die a little bit." In Season 9, when Bones receives a $75,000 advanced check from her book sales and asks Booth what he wants to do with it, he opts to donate it to the Wounded Warrior Project, a charity for injured veterans. In season 12, while working a case involving his former Army buddies, Booth admits to Bones that he had been lucky and was only able to move on with her support.

Booth had a gambling problem which developed as a coping mechanism after leaving the military. According to flashbacks in "The Parts in the Sum of the Whole," he only began to quit after meeting (and subsequently asking out) Bones for the first time while working a case together. As of the series pilot, he has been clean after attending GA meetings and has been able to resist the urge on several occasions when a case required him to be at a casino or a similar environment. In several episodes he can be seen twirling a poker chip (sometimes his GA sobriety chip) or playing with dice. In season 10 he suffered a relapse when a case required him to go undercover to infiltrate an underground gaming ring but managed to get it under control again when Brennan forced him to re-attend GA meetings.

In Season 4, it is stated that Booth has been in the FBI for twelve years, which implies that he would have joined the Bureau around 1996. However, this contradicts his statements in Season 6 about going AWOL to be present at the birth of his son, Parker (Parker was four when the show premiered in 2005) and in season 10 when he recounts to Wendell Bray of watching his men getting shot and killed by the Taliban during a mission in Ghazni, Afghanistan (American troops did not enter Afghanistan until after the attacks on September 11, 2001). A possible realistic explanation would be that Booth remained in the Army as a reservist.

It was during his time in the service that he first became acquainted with Jacob Broadsky (Arnold Vosloo), a fellow master sniper who later become a personal nemesis for Booth.

==== Awards and decorations ====
The following are the awards (decorations, medals/ribbons, and badges) fictionally worn by Sergeant Major Booth.

Personal Decorations
| | Bronze Star Medal |
| | Purple Heart |
| Width-44 myrtle green ribbon with width-3 white stripes at the edges and five width-1 stripes down the center; the central white stripes are width-2 apart | Army Commendation Medal with one silver oak leaf cluster |
| Width-44 ribbon with two width-9 ultramarine blue stripes surrounded by two pairs of two width-4 green stripes; all these stripes are separated by width-2 white borders | Army Achievement Medal with four oak leaf clusters |
Unit Awards
| | Presidential Unit Citation |
| | Meritorious Unit Commendation |
Service Awards
| | Army Good Conduct Medal |
Campaign and Service Medals
| | National Defense Service Medal with bronze service star |
| | Armed Forces Expeditionary Medal |
| | Southwest Asia Service Medal with two bronze service stars |
| | Afghanistan Campaign Medal with bronze service star |
| | Iraq Campaign Medal |
| | Global War on Terrorism Expeditionary Medal |
| | Global War on Terrorism Service Medal |
| | Armed Forces Service Medal |
Service, Training, and Marksmanship Awards
| | NATO Medal AFGHANISTAN Resolute Support Ribbon |
| | NCO Professional Development |
| | Army Service Ribbon |
| | Overseas Service Ribbon |
Foreign Awards
| | Kuwait Liberation Medal (Saudi Arabia) |
| | Kuwait Liberation Medal (Kuwait) |

Other Accoutrements
| Combat Infantryman Badge |
| Master Parachutist Badge |
| Air Assault Badge |
| Army Expert Marksmanship Badge |
| 75th Ranger Regiment Combat Service Identification Badge |
| Special Forces Tab |
| Ranger Tab |
| 4 Service Stripes (reflecting 12 years of service) |

== Characterization ==
John Kubicke of BuddyTV described Booth as "charming, funny, a tad brutish but ultimately warm and caring". He is worldly wise, socially at ease with people, very athletic, and apparently sexually confident with women. He often refers to himself as a jock, having played football and several other sports in high school and college. Other characters have described him as an "alpha male" and "a complex man".

Booth is portrayed as a patriot and has a strong sense of duty to his country and job. In "Soldier on the Grave", Angela described him as "someone who wants to keep honor and responsibility alive". For much of Season 1, this often led to friction between him and Jack Hodgins, who held anti-government views. According to Cam, Booth relies on his faith in the government to keep his sanity intact having killed nearly fifty people on government orders as an Army sniper. He takes his oath and position as a federal agent seriously and holds himself to an equally high standard; he is especially distressed whenever a law enforcement officer is involved and refuses to participate in cover-ups. Booth is also fiercely loyal and protective towards his friends and family to the point where he will not hesitate to physically threaten and intimidate anyone who attempts to harm them.

Booth is occasionally over-protective, often to Bones' annoyance, of his family and people he cares about. Sweets theorized that his protective instincts – which he labeled "white knight syndrome" – stems from his abusive childhood and his having to frequently protect his younger brother Jared from their alcoholic father. His former boss Sam Cullen called him a "paladin" – "Defender of the faith, protector".

Due in part to his Catholic upbringing, Booth sees the world and morality in black and white, which contrasts Bones' objective view of such abstract concepts. This conflicting view is often a source of friction and, later, banter between them. Booth draws the line between the "good guys" and "bad guys" and stated that "life is about taking sides", when asked about how he is able to reconcile his past as a sniper while hunting down his former mentor-turned-vigilante Jacob Broadsky. Booth once told Sweets that while he has killed (because he was following orders), he has never murdered. It is stated that Booth will not pull the trigger unless he is absolutely certain of the identity and guilt of the "target" he is about to kill and that it is sanctioned by a higher authority and not on his own volition. Booth views the law in a similarly subjective way and believes that committing a crime is never justifiable regardless of the circumstances. This, coupled with his "by the book" approach, is apparent when he arrests Bones' father Max, for killing the Deputy Director of the FBI (who was revealed to be part of a cover-up), in her own office without hesitation in the Season 2 finale "Stargazer in a Puddle", although he does apologize to Bones before leading Max out in handcuffs.

One of Booth's noted characteristics is his respect for life. Despite spending most of his working life around firearms, it is a known fact that he dislikes having to kill another human being and it remains a sensitive topic for him. His past as a sniper still haunts him emotionally and Bones surmised that his choice to become an FBI agent and his dedication for seeking justice for victims was his way of paying penance. In the pilot, he tells Bones that he hopes to catch as many criminals as people he has killed. In the episode "The Man in the S.U.V.", after shooting and killing a terrorist about to detonate a bomb at a crowded convention center, he refused to accept credit and explains to Bones that he finds "no pleasure in taking someone's life". When he shot a mechanical clown on an ice cream truck for seemingly no reason, he was ordered to see Dr. Gordon Wyatt for counseling in order to get his badge and gun back. In subsequent episodes Dr. Wyatt uncovers the guilt and anger Booth has been harboring for so long. In Season 6 Booth's FBI colleague Dr. Lance Sweets noted that the reason why Booth was able to live through the guilt was his ability to channel it into his career in the FBI and responsibility to his son and those he cared about.

Generally, Booth has a cheerful, happy-go-lucky personality. He frequently smiles, makes jokes, and occasionally acts in a silly, almost childish manner. On the job, he tends to adopt a more serious, professional attitude, although his cheerful side occasionally slips through. However, he also has issues with his temperament and, as shown in several episodes, it has gotten him in trouble on occasion. He shoots the clown head on an ice cream truck in season 2 episode "The Girl in the Gator" due to coulrophobia. As a result, his service pistol is confiscated and he is ordered to see Dr Gordon Wyatt (Stephen Fry) for counseling sessions to be cleared for duty. In Season 4 he shoots a black metal band's guitar amplifier after the guitarist spits on his badge and was promptly reprimanded by Dr Wyatt. There is a running gag in the show where Booth often sarcastically threatens to shoot a squint (especially Hodgins or a "squintern") in exasperation when they start "rambling" or occasionally an uncooperative suspect in the interrogation room. Despite his ability to emotionally detach himself from a case and compartmentalize, there were instances where he has "snapped", especially when a case touches a sensitive subject, such as when he physically hit a suspect who had a history of abusing his wife. Having grown up in an abusive home, he has admitted to Sweets and Bones of his fears that he would become like his father.

When investigating a crime, Booth relies on intuition and instinct honed from his training and experience, something which the rational empiricist Bones is unable to understand. His interpersonal approach is especially effective in the interrogation room – "[his] domain". Despite lacking the academic background of Bones and Sweets, he has been shown repeatedly to possess a natural ability to read people and detect subtle behavioral cues and accurately establish motive. Initially Bones rebuffs Booth's intuition as she (at first) rejects anything that cannot be measured with numbers, research and scientific evidence, but he soon earns her and the team's respect for his ability to correctly interpret evidence. In Season 4, Bones tries to interrogate a suspect for the first time but fails, making a fool of herself in the process. She eventually concedes that the interpersonal aspects of the job and interrogations are still exclusively Booth's area of expertise. In Season 9, while Booth and Bones were observing Sweets interrogating a highly intelligent suspect, he explains to her Sweets' techniques and the suspect's behavioral responses. Despite his general demeanor and occasional silliness, Booth is actually very intelligent, but frequently downplays his intelligence, deliberately making himself look stupid and ignorant (something made easier by keeping Bones around as an intellectual contrast). This leads people to dismiss him as a simple fool, lulling them into a false sense of security which Booth uses to his advantage. Angela has observed that his ability to "pretend to be stupider than he actually is most of the time" was what made him such a skilled interrogator, as opposed to Bones, whose bluntness often gives a poor first impression and puts people off. Gordon Wyatt has also noticed this: on one occasion when Booth made a stupid comment, Wyatt immediately called him out on it, saying "He does that, doesn't he? He wants to be underestimated." Angela also believes that Booth pretends to be stupid in order to make Bones feel smarter, since he knows that she likes to be the smart one. Booth is often frustrated by the scientific and highly technical jargon Bones and the other scientists, and sometimes Sweets, tend to use, as shown when he abruptly cuts them off in the middle of a sentence and tells them to "translate" into layman's terms. Although lacking the squints' "book smarts", he compensates with his instincts honed from his experience in the FBI, as shown by the fact that he is able to accurately guess Bones' top three password choices. Although Bones still ridicules the concept of "gut feeling", she and the Jeffersonian team have deferred to his own expertise as a federal agent, especially when connecting the crime with the weapon used.

Booth tends to keep his personal and professional life as separate as possible and is quite territorial, especially in regards to his personal life and what he considers his personal space. This is exhibited by the fact that he displays his military medals and memorabilia in his office rather than in his home and his horrified reaction to Sweets using the master bathroom and helping Bones fold his underwear when the latter was temporarily staying with him and Bones in season 8. He is also extremely guarded and taciturn about most aspects of his personal life, namely his abusive father, troubled childhood, "love life" and traumatic experiences in the military. For example, in the episode "A Night at the Bones Museum", he becomes offended when Bones talks about him while on a date with his "boss's boss" Andrew Hacker and curtly tells her that "what goes on between us is ours". When asked more personal questions, such as about his emotional problems, especially by Sweets or Bones, his first reaction is to change the subject, deflect them with jokes or become defensive. Even when confronted privately "out of office", he usually refuses to talk outright, choosing instead to downplay his emotions and brood over a drink at the bar. In later seasons, he has begun to openly admit to Bones or Cam when he is "not ok" instead of brushing it off.

On the job, Booth is characterized as a "man of action" and once claimed that he would "rot behind a desk". Early in season 8, he was given an opportunity to earn a promotion to an administrative position but passed up the chance in order to help Sweets and rookie agent Olivia Sparling with an emergency situation involving an assassin armed with an explosive. Bones herself commented that Booth being assigned to a desk job was akin to "caging an animal" and that he was "meant to run free". Booth tends to shy away from the limelight when it comes to taking credit for solving a case. He tends to be a kinesthetic person who favors the physical aspects of his job, such as chasing down suspects or leading a SWAT team, and would throw around a ball or putt a golf ball into a cup in his office while thinking through his cases.

Booth is a fan of classic rock and arena rock music. He has expressed great affection for the group Foreigner (in fact, Foreigner's "Hot Blooded" is Booth's & Bones' song), and poked fun at Bones for her interest in world, rap, and hip hop music. He also likes the band Poco. In the season three finale, he listens to the hardcore punk/punkabilly band Social Distortion. In the Season 4 episode "Mayhem on the Cross" he mentions that his father thought that Black Flag and the Dead Kennedys sounded the same. Given the relatively underground nature of the California hardcore punk scene, of which Social Distortion, Black Flag and the Dead Kennedys were all seminal members, it is most likely that Booth's father would have heard these bands only if Booth himself had played their records. He is also familiar with country music as his grandfather "raised [him] on Grand Ole Opry".

Booth shows a preference for the old school. He despises new age innovations, feeling that technology dehumanizes everything. He hates cappuccinos, referring to it as "foamy crap" and not actual coffee, only drinking his coffee black. He hates tea as well: when working on a case in England, he remarks that his drink is "the weakest coffee I've ever had". When Brennan informs him that it isn't coffee, but actually tea, Booth immediately discards it by throwing it in the river. He also dislikes reading news on a tablet, preferring to hold the newspaper in his hands, and had a vintage fridge in his kitchen at his old apartment. Bones told Hannah that Booth has always wanted an old-fashioned rotary telephone, as he believes that it is what a phone should be: sturdy and heavy enough to knock someone out. He also believes that the mechanics of it make it human.

It is revealed in the season three episode "The Mummy in The Maze" that Booth suffers from coulrophobia. When traveling through a haunted house, Booth is frightened of an evil clown mannequin; Brennan is bewildered by his behavior and Booth feels ashamed when he purposely avoids walking by the mannequin. In season two he shoots a large plastic clown head on an ice cream truck, annoyed with the music. Booth wears a "Cocky" belt buckle in episodes following "The Boneless Bride in the River", which is absent in the first episode of season five after recovery from surgery. However, in the first two seasons he wears a stylized eagle buckle and for most of Season 9 he is seen wearing a heavy buckle with crossed muskets, the insignia of the US Army Infantry Branch. He also likes to wear colorful socks. In the episode "The Wannabe in the Weeds", it is revealed that he is allergic to grass.

Toward the end of season 4, Booth suffers from a brain tumor that leads him to hallucinate conversations with Stewie Griffin. The tumor is successfully removed, but it leaves him with residual memory loss and a lack of confidence in the field.

Actor David Boreanaz contributed tangible personal elements to Booth's characterization, regularly wearing items—such as a brass Zippo lighter, craps dice, and a St. Christopher’s medal—that served as on-screen props reflecting the character’s background and identity. Boreanaz also intentionally deviated from FBI technical preparation, choosing instead to emphasize Booth’s military past as a field-hardened Army sniper, rather than portraying him as a textbook agent. He explained, “Everything that they told me about the FBI I threw out the door… I took the approach of the military aspect of the guy working for the FBI.” In addition, Boreanaz and Emily Deschanel built their on-screen chemistry through regular weekend sessions with acting coach Ivana Chubbuck, rehearsing and rewriting scenes to cultivate the informal rapport that became central to Booth and Brennan’s dynamic.

== Series ==
In the series pilot, Booth was introduced as an FBI special agent in the homicide department who seeks the professional opinion of Dr. Temperance Brennan at the (fictional) renowned Jeffersonian Institute. He was eventually made the liaison between the Jeffersonian and the FBI, much to his chagrin, but he soon develops a close working relationship with the Jeffersonian team of scientists, whom Booth and his fellow FBI agents call "squints", a nickname which has since become a term of endearment Bones and her team associate him with. Booth once referred to the Jeffersonian team of scientists, whom he affectionately calls the "squint squad", as "my people". Caroline Julian, a federal prosecutor who frequently works with them, has commented that aside from him "there isn't a single normal law enforcement officer who could work with these people." Bones herself often immediately objects when another agent (other than Booth) is assigned to work with her. Although not as "book smart" as the other "squints", he is quick to link evidence with and often uses his "street smarts" and intuition to assist the case. He is characterized as a "hands on" agent and makes no secret of his distaste for paperwork and formal documentation.

Booth is based at the J. Edgar Hoover Building along with his late colleague Dr. Lance Sweets and current partner Special Agent James Aubrey but frequents the Jeffersonian, which he jokingly dubbed "Squint Central", for updates on the evidence and has his own access card. The fact that he has his own office and is called "sir" by younger agents denotes some seniority or supervisory status. In addition, when his credentials are seen close up, the acronym "SSA" can be seen, strongly implying that Booth holds the rank of Supervisory Special Agent. It has been implied through interactions with other characters that Booth is generally well regarded and respected within the Bureau and other federal agencies for his skill, even if his distaste for the politics that entails his job has put him at odds with his boss and other local and federal law enforcement agencies. Little is known about his work history in the FBI except for the fact that he spent a period of time in Japan as part of an exchange program with the Tokyo Police. His call sign is 22705.

Because of his training as an FBI agent and military background, he adheres to protocol and the chain of command. As such, he often has to keep the "squints" in line when a case emotionally affects them in order to ensure that they abide by the rules and not jeopardize the case. When necessary, Booth will not hesitate to bend the rules or use underhanded tactics to get what he needs, and will go through great lengths to obtain a confession, especially when the situation is urgent or desperate (e.g. a hostage situation), but he will not stoop to actually breaking the law or disobeying protocol. His former special forces training and experience has proven useful at times, especially in cases involving firearms or armed and dangerous suspects. Other notable incidents include in Season 4 when he was kidnapped by "The Grave Digger" and had to find his way out of a decommissioned Navy ship rigged with explosives; in Season 6 when he was forced to pursue rogue vigilante sniper Jacob Broadsky through a container terminal without back-up; in the Season 9 episode "The Sense in the Sacrifice" when he tracks down tech-savvy serial killer Christopher Pelant undetected through an abandoned power plant alone and armed with only a knife, rifle and pistol; and in the season 9 finale where he utilized his knowledge of explosives to singlehandedly subdue former special forces operatives who were sent to assassinate him.

A highly skilled marksman, Booth is well-known within the Bureau as a "legendary shot". While in the Army he achieved the "Expert" Marksmanship Badge and is still proficient with a sniper rifle. He mentioned in "Fire in the Ice" that he does not have a "wrong hand", implying that he is comfortable using either hand to shoot despite being predominantly right-handed. He is also equally proficient with vintage firearms, demonstrating the double tap technique with a replica World War II-era Carcano for one of Hodgins' experiments in "The Proof in the Pudding" and completing the shooting contest at a cowboy competition with ease using 19th-century guns and rifles in "The Cowboy in the Contest". He is also a skilled knife thrower and is familiar with various types of explosives and weapons.

Booth states in "The Girl in the Gator" that Howard Epps was his fiftieth kill. However, Booth is not technically responsible for Epps' death, so as of "The Man in the Cell" his official kill count is at 49. However, as of "The Mastodon in the Room", Booth's official kill count is at least 54, as he killed the serial killer dressed as a clown (50), Gormogon (51), a corrupt sheriff(52), a doctor (53) and a terrorist (54). He has also killed serial killer Christopher Pelant and two of the three Delta Force assassins sent to kill him in "The Recluse in the Recliner".

Booth generally tries to keep his personal and professional life separate. He dislikes bringing his work back home and tries to avoid discussing a case after hours. Despite this, there were several occasions where his past has caught up with him. During the sixth season, while dealing with his complicated relationship with Brennan and his new girlfriend Hannah Burley (Katheryn Winnick), Booth faces his former mentor Jacob Broadsky, a former Army sniper who has apparently gone rogue. Broadsky kills the Gravedigger, a serial kidnapper and killer who threatened both Booth and Brennan, destroys identifying evidence, and escapes. Broadsky points out that Booth has no definite proof that would allow him to feel comfortable shooting his old teacher. Booth is comforted by the news that Brennan does not see him and Broadsky as identical and later successfully arrests him without having to kill him. At the end of Season 8 and the beginning of Season 9, serial killer and hacker Christopher Pelant murders several of Booth's fellow FBI agents and blackmails Booth into calling off his wedding to Bones. Booth later tracks down and kills Pelant with a single bullet to the center of his chest. In season 12 the son of the Serbian general he had been assigned to kill nearly twenty years ago during the Bosnian War comes to Washington D.C. seeking revenge.

In the Season 9 episode "The Cold in the Case", the Deputy Director personally requests Booth to review other agents' case files and has Sweets analyze Booth's performance and military record. The FBI intends to open a field office in Germany, where the US has a major military command and, according to Booth, would be a prime location for counter-terrorism activities. Booth was being considered for a promotion to head the new field office on a 2-year assignment. After finding out that Sweets had been ordered to review his military record, Booth worried that the promotion was based on his military training as a sniper rather than his service record at the Bureau. Bones expressed her support even if meant having to uproot the family to a foreign country. In the next episode, Booth reveals that the Deputy Director Victor Stark put in his recommendation and that he is to be confirmed by the congressional subcommittee before it is finalized. In the Season 9 finale, he was due to be confirmed by Congress as the new head of the Berlin office but his investigation into the Ghost Killer case and the murder of a conspiracy blogger harboring information of a mass blackmail involving cover-ups and corrupt government officials and businessmen led to him being targeted. Booth presents a proposal entitled Hiding in sight: A blueprint for addressing potential terrorist activity at the hearing. However, he was placed on administrative leave when classified information from his service record is exposed by a congressman questioning him, sparking a media frenzy and leading Booth to speculate if he was intentionally nominated for the promotion to be made an example of. At the end of the episode, Booth was attacked by three Delta Force operatives sent to silence him in his and Bones' house and was seriously injured in the subsequent gunfight. Bones calls an ambulance in time but Booth is charged with killing three FBI agents supposedly sent to serve an arrest warrant and is handcuffed to his hospital bed. She is taken into custody for questioning on the orders of Deputy Director Stark after vehemently protesting that the "FBI agents" were in fact Delta Force assassins and that Booth was "defending himself". He was released from prison in the Season 10 premiere and reinstated despite concerns from Brennan and Sweets that he was coming back to work too soon. In the season 10 finale, Booth announced that the case presented in that episode would be his last case with the FBI. His wife also decided the case would be her last with the Jeffersonian. The couple pack their belongings and leave their respective offices. Season 11 begins with Booth having taken up a position as a freelance instructor at the FBI Academy. However, he returns to the FBI full-time after his brother's death.

== Relationships ==
=== Family ===
Abused by his father and abandoned by his mother, Booth has a difficult and troubled relationship with most of his immediate family members. He and his brother Jared had a strained relationship, especially after Jared, a Navy lieutenant commander and intelligence officer based at the Pentagon, asked Bones out on a date while visiting the Jeffersonian with Seeley. Jared Booth was a recurring character in the series, and his arrivals are often met with tension by Booth. Bones has commented that the two brothers "can barely be in a room together". Booth tended to be "over-protective" of Jared, which the latter resented, when they were growing up and it added to the animosity. Jared once told Sweets that "having a big brother is like having an extra dad, only a dad who protects you from your real dad." When they were young, Booth would protect Jared from their father by shielding him during a beating. In Season 4, Booth sacrificed credit for a major crime bust and potential promotion to keep Jared from getting arrested after he was caught drunk-driving as another DUI would cost him his Navy career. Cam has said that Jared had a history of getting into trouble and Booth having to constantly bail him out. Their relationship improved dramatically after Jared steals critical evidence under the pretext of a classified military intelligence operation to assist the Jeffersonian team to rescue Booth from "The Grave Digger", sacrificing his Navy career as a result. In "The Dentist in the Ditch", he introduces his fiancée Padme to Seeley and asks him to be his best man at their wedding. Jared is killed in the Season 11 premiere. Bones performed the autopsy and her results confirmed that Jared had been physically abused as a child, like his older brother. Despite the fact that they had drifted apart, Booth still put his career and his own life on the line to save Jared, even though it eventually proved futile. Jared and Padme later separated and became estranged when he relapsed and Padme appears to blame both Booth and his wife for not helping her husband. Later, when discussing Jared's death with Bones, Booth commented on their contrasting lives and that the only reason why he, a recovering gambling addict, did not turn out like his brother was because he had her support.

Booth is close to his grandfather Hank, whom he affectionately calls "Pops". Prior to the character's introduction, Hank was rarely mentioned, at least by name, but it is apparent that he is fond of Booth and Booth cares deeply for him. Hank once told Bones during a visit that he was "more proud of [Booth] than anybody in the world".

For many years, Booth resented his parents and the mere mention of them, particularly his father, would elicit a hostile response from him. He detested his father for physically abusing him and Jared when they were young and, by his own statements, had not seen him for twenty years. In Season 7, when Booth learns of his father's death from Hank, he showed little emotion and repeatedly dismissed his colleagues' and the Jeffersonian team's concern throughout the day. After much persuasion from Bones, Booth reluctantly opens the box his father had left to him and sifts through the contents, which included a Purple Heart medal, the 1980 World Series tickets and old photos of father and son. It was one of the rare moments when Booth shed tears.

In Season 8, when his mother Marianne reappears after 24 years to ask Booth to give her away at her wedding to her fiancee, he was reluctant to do so as he was still angry with her for abandoning the family. After realizing that Marianne was genuinely trying to repair their relationship and seeing how well she got along with Bones and their daughter Christine, Booth decides to go to his mother's wedding. She, along with Hank and Parker, were present at Booth and Bones' wedding in Season 9.

Booth is characterized as a doting father to his three children, Parker, Christine and Hank Jr. (nicknamed "Little Hank"). He has a son named Parker (Ty Panitz) with his ex-girlfriend, Rebecca, who refused to marry him. Rebecca is at first hostile, and denied him visitation out of spite, but relations between them later dramatically improve. Initially Booth had mistakenly thought that she turned him down because the precarious nature of his job and irregular work hours would prevent him from being a good father but she later confronts him and assures him that he was a "wonderful father" and that Parker was a "lucky kid". Parker is named after a friend of Booth's from the Army Rangers, Corporal Edward "Teddy" Parker, who was fatally shot while spotting for Booth on a sniper mission. In the Season 1 episode "The Man in the Fallout Shelter", Parker is first introduced to the show and it is revealed that prior to this, none of the "squints", including Bones, knew that Booth had a son. Booth is characterized as a doting and occasionally over-protective father. He coached Parker's tee ball team. When he and Bones move into their new house, Parker is given his own room. In Season 7 it is revealed that Parker is living in England with his mother but visits Booth during the holidays.

He and Brennan have their daughter Christine Angela in Season 7. She was named after Brennan's mother Christine Brennan and their co-worker and friend Angela Montenegro. When Parker returns for vacation and sees her for the first time, Booth worries about sibling jealousy but is relieved when Parker hand-makes a mobile for Christine and accepts her into the family. In many episodes, Booth is seen playing with Christine. Of her parents' associates and colleagues, Christine is particularly close to Sweets, whom she calls "Uncle Sweets", as he had babysat her since she was an infant, sometimes together with his girlfriend-turned-fiancée Daisy.

In "The Twisted Bones in the Melted Truck", Booth mentions an eccentric aunt of his, who "spent every last dime on old-fashioned cookie jars".

On multiple occasions in the series, characters have stated that Booth is a direct descendant of infamous assassin John Wilkes Booth. However, this is historically inaccurate, as the assassin died childless at the age of 26 just days after killing Abraham Lincoln. More feasible is that he is in fact a descendant of the same family but not John Wilkes himself. In either case, this relation is a particular sore-spot for Booth who does not like having it brought up.

=== Temperance Brennan ===
Temperance is Booth's professional partner throughout the series, and later, his wife. While Booth and Brennan maintain a professional relationship and friendship for six years, there is a deep emotional attachment and hints of romantic and sexual tension. Minor characters constantly mistake Booth and Brennan for an already romantic couple, an accusation which they consistently and vehemently deny, although they spend more and more time together outside of work and a sexual attraction between them develops. Although she refused to admit it at first, Bones enjoyed working with him from the beginning, even after their falling out when Booth got her drunk and "fired" her, and, in Season 1, she cajoled him into launching an investigation after finding three bone fragments on a golf course so he could work with the Jeffersonian team on the case despite the fact that the FBI had no jurisdiction. Initially, Brennan detested Booth's use of the nickname "Bones", frequently snapping "Don't call me Bones!", although over time she accepted it and even began to like it, occasionally referring to herself using the nickname. Booth has admitted to Brennan and her father that he finds her "well-structured" and "beautiful," and has once reassured her that she has "her looks and a whole lot more". In "Two Bodies in the Lab", in season 1, and in "The Rocker in the Rinse Cycle", in season 5, Brennan and Booth's mutual love for Foreigner's "Hot Blooded" is mentioned; Booth even refers to it as "their song" in "The Rocker in the Rinse Cycle", and it is the first song on the mix tape he makes for her in "The Ghost in the Machine".

Booth's grandfather Hank and Bones' father Max expressed approval of their relationship early on, even before Booth and Bones openly admitted that they were more than just professional partners, and Hank and Max incredulously asked Booth if he was gay when he denied that he was romantically involved with Bones. Max, in particular, strongly believed that Booth was the right man for his daughter despite the fact that Booth has had to arrest him a number of times for trying to take the law into his hands to protect Bones.

Throughout the show, Booth and Brennan's differences in worldviews are regularly addressed by various characters and was the source of friction early on in their partnership. She was dismissive of his religious beliefs (and organized religion in general) and would take the opportunity to downplay it. In Season 2 Booth expelled her from the interrogation room after she repeatedly made insensitive remarks, despite her good intentions, during an interview with a parish priest. Booth also has several heated arguments over various issues, especially religion. She gradually comes to respect and admire his faith when she realizes that it was his way of coping with the trauma and violence he witnesses on a regular basis at work. In numerous episodes she is shown trying to be supportive of Booth in spite of her social awkwardness, which Booth admits he finds endearing. When Sweets was observing them and writing a book on their relationship, Dr. Gordon Wyatt noted that Booth and Brennan are actually more similar despite appearing to be polar opposites – both experienced traumatic childhoods, are highly competent in their respective fields and extremely guarded about their personal lives. Although they maintained their different views after becoming a couple, they are shown to be very protective and trusting of one another.

Booth often takes Bones along to his investigations and interrogations, despite his superiors' and Caroline's initial reservations about a "squint" being in the field. Initially he was irritated by the scientific jargon she frequently used but over time comes to enjoy her company. He also taught her some investigative techniques and "black ops stuff", such as using a credit card to break open a locked door. In Season 4, at Sweets' persuasion, he allows her to interrogate suspects and since then, she has co-interrogated suspects with Booth in Sweets' absence. In the field, he sometimes takes advantage of her status as a civilian to obtain information which he, as a federal agent, would otherwise be unable to obtain without going through the time-consuming bureaucratic process. They often go undercover together as a couple whenever a case requires.

Booth shows an apparent jealousy of Brennan's romantic relationships, particularly in the episodes "Two Bodies in the Lab", "The Woman in Limbo", "The Headless Witch in the Woods", "The Man in the Mansion", "The Boneless Bride in the River", "The Con Man in the Meth Lab", and "A Night at the Bones Museum". In Season 2 his FBI colleague Special Agent Tim "Sully" Sullivan asks him for "advice" on how to woo Bones, Booth tells him simply that he will not "help [him] get my partner into bed". Booth has a habit of intimidating, confronting or competing with anyone he believes to have a sexual interest in Brennan. He is extremely protective of her, and is often defensive of her to the point of physically assaulting those who pose a threat to her safety. Likewise, Bones has defended him whenever his ability is called into question and repeatedly made known that Booth is the only FBI agent she (and the other "squints") tolerate working with. Booth has saved Brennan's life in several episodes, such as "Aliens in a Spaceship", "The Wannabe in the Weeds" and "The Woman in the Garden". In the third season, their relationship takes on a new component when they are forced to undergo partners therapy with Sweets, who observes that they are very close and there is emotional and sexual tension between them. Partners therapy is extended indefinitely. The partners share their first (in a flashback) and third kisses in "The Parts in the Sum of the Whole"; the second occurs in "The Santa in the Slush" when Booth and Brennan agree to kiss under mistletoe in front of Caroline Julian, an attorney Booth frequently works with. Nearly every episode after season three ends with a scene of Booth and Brennan bonding, which become increasingly romantic over time, reflecting the ever-growing affection Booth and Brennan have for each other. This comes to a head in "The Critic in the Cabernet," in which Brennan asks Booth to donate sperm to father her child. He is startled but eventually agrees. The two begin making plans for her insemination, but before she can go through with it, Booth is diagnosed with a brain tumor.

In Season five, Booth realizes his love for Brennan as he recovers from his tumor. However, he is cautioned by both Dr. Saroyan and Dr. Sweets to be sure of his feelings before confessing his love to Brennan. Afraid that his feelings for her are related solely to his tumor and coma, Booth is conflicted about whether or not to tell Brennan. Afterwards, their relationship remains fraught with sexual tension. Although she shares his feelings, Brennan rejects his advance and states her uncertainty about the possible outcomes of such a relationship given their seemingly conflicting personalities. Booth agrees to respect her wishes and attempts to move on as they continue to work together. In the episode "The Boy with the Answer", Booth is confronted with the possibility that Brennan, claiming she is "tired of dealing with murders and victims and sadness and pain", might leave the Jeffersonian permanently. In the final scene of this episode, Booth watches as Brennan turns to face him while riding away in a taxi. Brennan departs for a year-long anthropological expedition to the Maluku Islands, while Booth agrees to spend a year in Afghanistan, training soldiers to apprehend terrorists. They say goodbye at the airport, agreeing to meet one year later. Their relationship takes a downturn after their return to DC due to Booth's relationship with journalist Hannah Burley; Brennan is apparently disappointed after learning that Hannah gets along with Parker. When Brennan admits that she still has feelings for Booth, he turns her down and says that he loves Hannah. Hannah departs after she turns down Booth's rather half-hearted proposal. Brennan and Booth begin to rekindle their relationship.

In the episode "The Hole in the Heart", in which Vincent Nigel-Murray dies, Booth has Brennan stay at his apartment for her safety. Later that night, Brennan is still overcome with grief over Vincent's death and she turns to Booth for comfort. The two fall into his bed together in a seemingly intimate but non-sexual embrace. The next day, she tells Angela Montenegro that she "got into bed with Booth". In the following episode, she tells Booth that she is pregnant with his child. At the start of season seven, a very pregnant Brennan and Booth are in a relationship and going back and forth between apartments. Booth suggests that they should have their own place; Brennan wants Booth to move into her apartment. It causes a minor rift between them. At the end of the episode they are in bed looking at houses on the internet. Booth also tells Brennan he loves her and left it to her to decide when she wants to get married. After much discussion, Booth and Brennan agree to give up their apartments and move in together. In the episode "The Crack in the Code", they decide to buy a two-story house in the suburbs—which they jokingly called "The Mighty Hut"—that Booth found at a police auction and renovate it, (according to a mailed check sent to Brennan in "The Heiress in the Hill", in season 9, the "Mighty Hut"'s address is "1297 Janus Street, Washington DC, 20002"). In the following episode, Booth delivers their daughter in a small stable off the road when Brennan cannot make it to the hospital to give birth. They name their baby Christine Angela, after Bones' mother and Angela Montenegro. Booth also tells Bones that she would be the one to ask him to marry her since he believed in marriage and she was the one who needed the make the decision. In the season finale Bones is framed by tech-savvy serial killer Christopher Pelant, who is released when the jury finds him "not guilty". Bones, with help from Max, is forced to go on the run with Christine in order to avoid being arrested and buy Booth and the team enough time to clear her. Prior to her departure, she and Booth had Christine christened into the Catholic church out of respect for his religious beliefs.

The family reunite in the Season 8 premiere and, by the second episode, Bones and Christine have returned home. However the couple have some difficulty readjusting after nearly three months apart with almost no contact with one another. Booth puts up a facade but was still resentful and bitter over the separation. They resolve their differences by the end of the episode.

At the end of Season 8, Brennan finally decides to marry Booth, who is overjoyed. However, their plans are ruined when a vengeful Christopher Pelant blackmails Booth, threatening to kill five random people if Booth marries Brennan. Booth calls off the wedding, but does not explain the real reason to Brennan. For the first several episodes of the season, despite their efforts to mask the frustration and resentment, there was much tension between the two of them and between Booth and the other squints, who accused Booth of being unfaithful and getting "cold feet" at the last minute. In the Season 9 premiere, Booth confided in his friend Aldo Clemens, a former Army chaplain turned bartender, about Pelant's threat against him and he was having trouble mending his relationship with Brennan. At the end of the episode, Brennan decides to stay with Booth, much to his relief, and tell him that she is willing to trust him. In episode 4, "The Sense in the Sacrifice", Booth vows to take Pelant out once and for all, especially after Pelant murdered his colleague FBI Special Agent Flynn and manipulated evidence to frame Flynn. After killing Pelant, Booth reveals to Bones Pelant's threats and why he called the wedding off. He then reiterates his marriage proposal, which she happily accepts.

In the Season 9 episode "The Woman in White", Booth and Bones prepare for their wedding. Bones agreed to a church wedding after realizing the sacrifice Booth had made as the Catholic church does not condone co-habitation; Aldo had told her that Booth was willing to sacrifice his soul and "live in sin" if it meant being with her. She rationalized the decision, saying that she could see the "beauty" behind the ceremony and tradition associated with a Catholic wedding and added that she also knew Latin. However, their plans are ruined by a cold case and a fire in the church in which they were to be married. With Angela's help, they hold a last-minute simple garden ceremony outside the Jeffersonian. Aldo presided over the ceremony in the presence of Booth's mother Marianne, grandfather Hank and son Parker, Bones' father Max and their close friends from the Jeffersonian. They spent their honeymoon in Buenos Aires, Argentina. Their infant son Hank Jr. (named after Booth's grandfather) was born off-screen sometime after season 10 and before the beginning of season 11.

=== Rebecca Stinson ===
Rebecca Stinson, portrayed by Jessica Capshaw, is Booth's ex-girlfriend. When she became pregnant, Booth proposed but Stinson did not accept. They named their son Parker Matthew Booth, the first name "Parker" after Booth's friend who died in the army. They occasionally engage in a liaison, but are mostly just friends. Booth resolves to end their liaisons after Rebecca assuages his doubts that he was a good father to Parker.

=== Camille Saroyan ===
Booth rekindles an old relationship with Dr. Camille Saroyan when she joins the Jeffersonian team. However, Booth ends the relationship for the second time after an intense case nearly costs Saroyan her life. Booth asserts that on-the-job romantic relationships endanger the team in high-pressure situations. Booth has known Saroyan for some length of time; in Season 4, it is stated that she has known Booth and his brother Jared for some 15 years. She was one of the few characters who already knew about the brothers' abusive childhood and they call each other by their first names, at least in private; there is a running joke where Booth counters with, "Don't call me Seeley," to which Cam replies, "Don't call me Camille." Despite the breakup, Saroyan and Booth remain close friends, working together on cases and giving each other advice on numerous occasions.

=== Hannah Burley ===
Hannah Burley, portrayed by Katheryn Winnick, is Booth's ex-girlfriend whom he met while training soldiers in Afghanistan. She was originally in Afghanistan as a journalist. She moved to Washington D.C. to be with Booth and they eventually moved in together in Booth's apartment. However, they soon break up when Hannah rejects Booth's half-hearted proposal and she moves out of his apartment.

=== With colleagues and the Jeffersonian team ===
Booth's appointment to the Jeffersonian was met with mixed reaction from Bones' team members. In the first few episodes, it was apparent that Booth did not fit in with the "squints" and was immediately put-off by the scientific jargon they use when discussing a case. He gradually develops a close working relationship and becomes friends with them outside of work. This was evidenced in the Season 2 episode "Judas on a Pole", when Booth was "suspended without pay" by the Deputy Director for pursuing a thirty-year-old cover-up in order to solve the more recent murder of a fellow FBI agent, Bones and the rest of the team, realizing that it meant that Booth can no longer work with them, all volunteer to continue the investigation so that Booth will be reinstated. At the end of the episode Booth was reinstated and Bones invites him to join the rest of the team in celebrating Zack Addy's appointment at the Jeffersonian, telling him that "we are, all of us, your squints". The rest of the team have since accepted Booth, as shown in several episodes where Booth's life was threatened and the "squints" all go the extra mile to ensure his safety. Likewise he vows to protect them at all costs when they were threatened by rogue sniper Jacob Broadsky in Season 6 and serial killer Christopher Pelant in Season 8. Whenever one of them encounters a traumatic event (e.g. watching someone die) he shows concern and tries to help them deal with the trauma, such as when co-worker and intern Vincent Nigel-Murray was killed in their own lab.

Early in Season 1 Jack Hodgins was particularly hostile to him due to his disdain for the government and bureaucracy in general. Booth's patriotism, position as a federal agent and military background and Hodgins' argumentative nature further added to the friction. Booth soon earns his respect when he lets Hodgins accompany him to rescue Bones, who was being held captive by a rogue FBI agent, and Hodgins witnesses Booth shooting the perpetrator as the latter was about to kill Bones. While they still maintain their respective opposing views, they are on friendly terms and Booth often calls him "bug boy". At the end of the second season, he agrees to be Hodgin's best man in his wedding to Angela Montenegro (albeit as the second choice after Zack Addy turned the position down). Hodgins also asks for Booth's advice about proposing to Angela. Booth has the tendency to cut Hodgins off in the middle of a conversation whenever the latter starts using scientific jargon, although Hodgins generally tolerates it. In season 4, when Booth's FBI colleague Special Agent Perotta takes over an investigation in which Booth is a suspect, Hodgins and intern Wendell Bray immediately declare to Agent Perotta that they are "Booth's people" rather than Perotta's. Booth also intentionally ignores Hodgins' "insane conspiracist ravings" and uses Hodgins' knowledge to his advantage, especially while investigating the Gormogon murders. By the time of "High Treason in the Holiday Season", Booth and Hodgins have become comfortable enough with each other's views that Booth asked for Hodgins' honest opinion on what they should do with a hard drive they had recently acquired which contained data on illegal NSA operations (Hodgins ultimately concluded that releasing the data would put innocent NSA agents at risk even if the operations they were taking part in were technically illegal).

Of the "squints", Booth gets along best with Angela Montenegro due to her ability to relate to him in layman's terms and knowledge of pop culture. Angela was initially attracted to Booth. When she realizes that Booth and Bones were "meant for each other", she repeatedly attempts to match-make them. She often gave both of them tips on how to get along with and appease the other.

Booth had a difficult relationship with Brennan's assistant Zack Addy, as he finds Zack Addy's cold naïveté and social awkwardness disconcerting and, later, irritating. After failing to woo a colleague, "Naomi from paleontology", whom he was attracted to, Addy approached Booth for "advice" in the episode "A Boy in a Tree", much to Booth's annoyance and did so ever since. Booth has threatened to shoot Addy on several occasions out of exasperation. Addy admires Booth as a man of experience, and repeatedly asks him for advice on various issues, including sexual relationships. Booth convinces Addy that ignoring one another is a form of male bonding in order to deter Addy from continuously asking him anymore awkward questions and so that he could avoid hurting Addy's feelings. In Season 2 Addy receives a letter from the White House requesting his services in Iraq and Addy asks Booth if "it hurt to get shot", as Booth was the only one of the group who had any first-hand combat experience in a war zone. When Booth asks him why, he shows Booth the letter, explaining that he chose to ask Booth as the latter "[knows] more about duty and honor than anyone else I know". Before Addy goes to Iraq, Booth gives him a harmonica as a parting gift. Following the climax of the events at the end of season 3, Booth regrets that he had never talked much to Zack, feeling that if he had he would have caught onto Zack's affiliation with Gormogon sooner and could, perhaps, have done something about it.

When fellow FBI agent Dr. Lance Sweets first joined the team, Booth treated him in a condescending manner, due to his youth and boyish looks. Booth was one of the few who acknowledged the importance of psychological insight into an investigation and would bring Sweets along to investigations, albeit grudgingly — he disliked Sweets' habit of repeatedly questioning him when he was in a bad mood or confronting him with details of his private life when in the car en route to the crime scene despite Sweets' good intentions. Whenever Sweets made him feel uncomfortable in that manner, he would interrupt and cut him off with a sarcastic comment or directly tell him to be quiet. Booth became less sarcastic and more understanding with Sweets when he learns about the latter's own abusive childhood and subsequent yearning for a family after the death of his adoptive parents as he himself was abused as a child. Despite his tendency to pull rank on Sweets by making him do undesirable tasks such as paperwork or frequently light-heartedly mock him, he cares deeply for the younger agent and the two have an underlying mutual respect. Since then Sweets has been a close friend to Booth and his family outside of work. He also consults Sweets on a number of issues, including his feelings for Bones. When Booth was suspended from the field, he consulted with Dr. Gordon Wyatt instead of Sweets, who is the department's designated psychologist, in order to avoid having to put Sweets in a difficult position of having to choose between their friendship and his professional responsibility. In Season 8 he invites Sweets to stay at his and Bones' home while Sweets deals with his second break-up with Daisy; Sweets helped with the chores and would babysit Christine. In the Season 10 premiere Sweets and Daisy are back together and ask Booth to be the godfather of their unborn son. The character is killed off later in the episode, leaving Booth visibly distraught.

Booth is generally wary of most of the "squinterns" due to their eccentric personalities, especially Aubrey's one-time love interest Jessica Warren and Sweets' girlfriend Daisy Wick. In season 10, following Sweets' death, he begins to treat Daisy more like a younger sister and looks out for her and her newborn son. He is good friends with Wendell Bray, one of Brennan's favorite interns, and they play ice hockey together on the same amateur team. In Season 9, Booth is visibly distraught when Brennan tells him that she suspects Wendell has Ewing's sarcoma. When Cam was forced to fire Wendell for using medical marijuana due to Jeffersonian rules, Booth, with Bones' and Caroline's help, find a loophole and Wendell is re-employed as an independent consultant reviewing case files and evidence reports, much to Cam's relief and delight.

== Reception ==
John Kubicek of BuddyTV placed him on his list of the "15 Hottest TV Dads", describing the occasional moments he shares with his son as "tender and real". He was included in TV Guide's list of "TV's Sexiest Crime Fighters". His relationship with Temperance Brennan was listed in Entertainment Weekly's "30 Best 'Will They/Won't They?' TV Couples" and TV Tango's "Top 10 Romantically Challenged TV Couples".

Booth's background and personal tastes loosely mirror those of actor David Boreanaz, who portrays the character. Boreanaz was raised in the Philadelphia area, was born in Buffalo (his father – known variously as Dave Thomas or Dave Roberts – worked in both cities, including hosting Rocketship 7 in Buffalo), supports the Flyers and was an avid athlete in school. An ice hockey fan and amateur player, his love of the sport is frequently referenced on the show as the character is often seen wearing a Flyers T-shirt when off-duty, and several episodes have featured NHL players.
