= South of Wawa =

- Directed by: Robert Boyd
- Written by: Lori Lansens
- Produced by: Susan Cavan; Andras Hamori; Barbara Tranter
- Starring: Rebecca Jenkins; Catherine Fitch; Scott Renderer; Dawn Greenhalgh
- Cinematography: Tobias Schliessler
- Edited by: Bruce Lange
- Music by: Jeff Bird
- Distributed by: Accent Entertainment
- Release date: September 5, 1991 (TIFF)
- Running time: 91 min.
- Country: Canada
- Language: English

South of Wawa is a 1991 Canadian comedy film. It was written by Lori Lansens and directed by Robert Boyd.

The film stars Rebecca Jenkins as Lizette, a woman stuck in an unhappy marriage who organizes a road trip with her coworker Cheryl Ann (Catherine Fitch) to see Dan Hill in concert. Although the film's title alludes to the Northern Ontario town of Wawa, the film is actually set in the Western Ontario town of Stayner.

The film was released on VHS in 1995 in Canada by Cineplex Odeon, but as of 2026, a DVD of the film has yet to be announced.

== Plot ==
Lizette acquires four front-row tickets to the Dan Hill concert in Toronto, Ontario - one for her, one for her husband, Terry (Scott Renderer), one for Simon (Andrew Miller), and one for Simon's date. At the very last minute, Simon's date cancels and the group decides to invite Cheryl Ann to fill the seat.

Cheryl Ann becomes a memorable character not far into the film. She is eager, possesses an open attitude, and has a positive outlook on life no matter what comes at her. Her mother is dying, and she wishes to bring her to Greece for treatment from a "miracle man." Her car sometimes doesn't start and most of the time she ends up walking all the way to her job with Lizette at the donut shop. Despite the unfortunate events she is constantly victim to, Cheryl Ann sees the good in everything.

Lizette wants nothing more but to escape their small town of Stayner and everything in it, including her coworker Cheryl Ann. So when she receives the news that Cheryl Ann will be joining the group for the trip, she is anything but amused. The problem is that Simon will not go on the trip without a date, and Terry will not go without Simon. Both men would rather stay in town and attend the local hockey game, however Lizette wants this trip to be a success and therefore allows Cheryl Ann to come along.

Due to unforeseen circumstances, the evening does not go according to plan and the friends must examine their relationships with each other and others in town.

== Cast ==
- Catherine Fitch as Cheryl Ann
- Rebecca Jenkins as Lizette
- Scott Renderer as Terry
- Andrew Miller as Simon
- Samantha Langevin as Helen
- Stuart Clow as Cam
- Dawn Greenhalgh as Donna
- Elias Zarou as Joe
- Stephanie Forder as Darlene
- George Touliatos as Serge
- Michael Gencher as John "The Polack"
- Alyson Court as Shannon
- Mark Wilson as Sgt. Tom Goodie
- Helen Hughes as Mrs. Deneau
- Elena Kudaba as Gramma Soplinski

== Soundtrack ==
The film's soundtrack includes songs by Cowboy Junkies, Rickie Lee Jones, Lyle Lovett and Lee Aaron.
