= The Girls (Lansens novel) =

2005 novel by Lori Lansens

- First edition
- Author: Lori Lansens
- Language: English
- Genre: Novel
- Publisher: Knopf Canada (first edition); Little, Brown (first American edition)
- Publication date: 2005
- Publication place: Canada
- Media type: Print (Hardback and Paperback); Audiobook
- Pages: 352 pp
- ISBN: 0-676-97795-2 (first edition); ISBN 0-316-06903-5 (first American edition)
- OCLC: 60369615

The Girls is the second novel by Canadian novelist and screenwriter Lori Lansens. It was first published in 2005 by Knopf Canada.

== Plot ==
The Girls is the life story of a pair of conjoined twins, Rose and Ruby Darlen, and is narrated by the twins themselves. Rose, a budding writer, also details key moments from the lives of their adoptive parents, Aunt Lovey and Uncle Stash.

The girls are joined at the head (craniopagus twins), with Rose carrying her physically weaker and smaller sister on her right hip. According to the description of the condition at the start of the book, the girls are estimated to share 100 veins as well as skull bones. However, while their cerebral tissues are meshed, they have distinctly separate brains and so have different personalities.

The book is set in the fictional small town of Leaford in Ontario, Canada, with the girls frequently travelling to nearby cities of Chatham, Windsor, and London. The girls also accompany their Uncle Stash to his native Slovakia.

== Reception ==
In the Calgary Herald, Ali Riley described The Girls as "a tender and captivating glimpse into those who are 'other'". Bethany Schneider in Newsday called it "as much as commentary upon the limits of memoir as it is a novel of virtuosos complexity". "With a huge heart at its core and not a false beat anywhere, The Girls is not just a sophisticated literary accomplishment but a darned good read," concluded Eva Tihanyi's review in the Toronto Star.

== Honors ==
The Girls was recognized by the American Library Association as a 2007 Best Book for Young Adults. It was included in the 2007 selection of notable fiction books in Reference and User Services Quarterly. It was on the 2007 long list for the Women's Prize for Fiction.
