= Catherine Fitch =

Canadian actress

Catherine Fitch is a Canadian actress. She is most noted for her performance as Iris in the 1995 television film Butterbox Babies, for which she won the Gemini Award for Best Supporting Actress in a Television Film or Miniseries at the 10th Gemini Awards in 1996.

== Early life and education ==
Born in Balcarres, Saskatchewan, Fitch was raised in Balcarres and Red Deer, Alberta. She was educated at the University of Calgary and the National Theatre School of Canada.

== Career ==
She has also received two Gemini Award nominations for Supporting or Guest Performance in a Drama Series for her role as Rosemary in This Is Wonderland, and a Canadian Screen Award nomination for Best Supporting Actress in a Comedy Series for Living in Your Car.

Her other roles have included the films South of Wawa, Ordinary Magic, Borrowed Hearts, Bless the Child, Knockaround Guys, You Stupid Man, Away from Her, Picture Day and Cardinals, and the television series Street Legal, Emily of New Moon, Slings & Arrows and Murdoch Mysteries, as well as roles on stage.

== Filmography ==
=== Film ===
Year	Title	Role	Notes
1991	South of Wawa	Cheryl-Ann	
1993	Ordinary Magic	Doctor	
1995	Butterbox Babies	Iris	
2000	Bless the Child	Sister Helena	
2001	Knockaround Guys	Louise	
2002	You Stupid Man	Bartender	
2005	Niagara Motel	Sophie	
2005	The Prize Winner of Defiance, Ohio	Emma Hartzler	
2006	Away from Her	Receptionist	
2007	Saw IV	Additional voice	
2012	Picture Day	Vice-Principal	
2013	Compulsion	Crazed Fan	
2017	Cardinals	Wendy	
2019	The Kindness of Strangers	Donna	

=== Television ===
Year	Title	Role	Notes
1991	Street Legal	Sarah Langley	4 episodes
1993	Class of '96	Miss Siegel	Episode: "Bright Smoke, Cold Fire"
1993, 1996	Road to Avonlea	Selena Dale	3 episodes
1994	The Kids in the Hall	Brenda	Episode #4.19
1996	Goosebumps	Coach	Episode: "Be Careful What You Wish For"
1997	The Arrow	Ruby Paloffski	Miniseries
1997	The Adventures of Dudley the Dragon	Sprite	Episode: "Dudley's Big Decision"
1998	Twitch City	Ellen	Episode: "People Who Fight Too Much"
1998, 1999	Emily of New Moon	Maud Dutton	3 episodes
1999	Dear America: A Picture of Freedom	Miz Lilly	Television film
1999	The Famous Jett Jackson	Deputy Georgia	Episode: "Things that Fly"
1999	What Katy Did	Debbie	Television film
2000	Twice in a Lifetime	Nurse	Episode: "Whistle Blower"
2001	Ruby's Bucket of Blood	Miss Daigie	Television film
2002	Hell on Heels: The Battle of Mary Kay	Beverly	Television film
2003	Profoundly Normal	Margaret	Television film
2003	Blue Murder	Marion Gonchar	Episode: "Hard Times"
2003	1-800-Missing	Sheri Adelman	Episode: "M.I.A."
2003–2006	Slings & Arrows	Maria	17 episodes
2004	Puppets Who Kill	Emily Caring	Episode: "Buttons and the Geriatric"
2004	The Newsroom	Replacement Producer	Episode: "Say Cheese"
2004–2005	This Is Wonderland	Rosemary	5 episodes
2005	Life with Derek	Receptionist	2 episodes
2008	An Old Fashioned Thanksgiving	Principal	Television film
2008	Anne of Green Gables: A New Beginning	Cider Press Woman	Television film
2008, 2016	Murdoch Mysteries	Various roles	2 episodes
2010–2011	Living in Your Car	Peggy	5 episodes
2011	Lost Girl	Aunt Ludmila	Episode: "Mirror, Mirror"
2013	Warehouse 13	Maggie	Episode: "The Truth Hurts"
2015	Saving Hope	Helen Krueger	Episode: "Hearts of Glass"
2016	Coming In	Director	2 episodes
2017	Designated Survivor	Senator Elizabeth Vandenberg	Episode: "Party Lines"
2018	Killer High	Receptionist	Television film
2019	Anne with an E	Sister Cecilia	Episode: "A Hope of Meeting You in Another World"
2021	In the Dark	Nancy	Episode: "Safe and Sound"
2022	Reacher	Waitress	3 episodes
