= Knockaround Guys =

2001 film by David Levien, Brian Koppelman

- Theatrical release poster
- Directed by: Brian Koppelman; David Levien
- Written by: Brian Koppelman; David Levien
- Produced by: Lawrence Bender; Brian Koppelman; David Levien
- Starring: Barry Pepper; Vin Diesel; Seth Green; Andrew Davoli; John Malkovich; Dennis Hopper
- Cinematography: Tom Richmond
- Edited by: David Moritz
- Music by: Clint Mansell
- Distributed by: New Line Cinema
- Release dates: September 8, 2001 (Oldenburg International Film Festival); November 30, 2001 (Italy); October 11, 2002 (United States)
- Running time: 92 minutes
- Countries: Canada; United States
- Language: English
- Budget: $15 million
- Box office: $14.1 million

Knockaround Guys is a 2001 action crime thriller film starring Barry Pepper, Vin Diesel, Seth Green, John Malkovich and Dennis Hopper. It was filmed in locations in the U.S. and Canada including the small town of Delia, Alberta.

== Plot ==
A young Matty Demaret is forced by his father's associate Teddy to decide whether to kill or spare the man responsible for his father's arrest. When Matty is unable to pull the trigger, Teddy tells him he is unfit for mob work.

Years later, Matty is unable to find a job because employers fear his mob boss father, Benny Chains. He is unhappy doing menial jobs for his father, who apparently does not trust him with more serious criminal business. With Teddy's help, he convinces his father to let him go to Spokane to retrieve a package, which he sees as his chance to prove he's ready to be a real partner.

Matty commissions his friend Johnny Marbles to discreetly fly to Spokane, retrieve the package and return immediately, stopping only for gas. When he lands in Wibaux, Montana, he is startled to find police coincidentally checking the office. Fearing he'll be questioned about the bag, he drops it among baggage to be loaded on a departing flight. While inside paying for fuel, baggage handlers notice his bag is not properly tagged. Johnny returns to find the bag gone and calls Matty with the bad news. Matty brings his friends Chris (also the jilted son of a mobster) and Taylor to help find the bag.

The three look for an informant at a local bar and Taylor savagely beats a man who confronts them. Matty enlists his help to find anyone who might be spending a great deal of money (which was in the bag). That night, he finds out the two teenage baggage handlers have been spending rampantly. Matty, Johnny, Taylor and Chris go to the boys' house to confront them, but the sheriff, one of the boys' father, and his deputy arrive first and confiscate the money. The sheriff, against his deputy's wishes, decides to keep the money. Matty and the boys try to confront them amicably, but get run off. Realizing that they have reached a détente, Matty calls Teddy to help. Once he learns Matty's mob identity and fearing federal involvement, the sheriff agrees to meet with Matty for an exchange at midnight in a warehouse.

Fearing they are in too deep, Chris tries to convince Johnny to leave with him. Johnny refuses and Chris leaves. Teddy's associates ask Johnny where Chris is; realizing he has left but wanting to protect him, he says he does not know and is shot. Matty and Taylor are forced to go to the meet alone and encounter the sheriff and his deputy. Teddy and his associates also appear to even the odds, but the local informant, the sheriff's cousin, also arrives. Chris suddenly appears and kills the sheriff's cousin, triggering an all-out gunfight. Everyone but Taylor, Matty and Teddy is killed and Taylor is hit. Realizing Teddy has really come to take the money for himself, Matty confronts him. He admits that he has been stealing from Benny and aimed to take the money and kill Matty. He tries to discreetly reload and shoot Matty, but Matty kills him first.

Matty and Taylor return the money to Benny, who says he's ready for Matty to join the organization, but Matty refuses.

== Cast ==
- Barry Pepper as Matty Demaret
- Vin Diesel as Taylor Reese
- Seth Green as Johnny Marbles
- Andrew Davoli as Chris Scarpa
- John Malkovich as Teddy Deserve
- Dennis Hopper as Benny "Chains" Demaret
- Arthur Nascarella as Billy Clueless
- Tom Noonan as Sheriff Stan Decker
- Nicholas Pasco as Freddy the Watch
- Shawn Doyle as Deputy Sheriff Donny Ward
- Kevin Gage as Gordon Brucker
- Andrew Francis as Matty (age 13)
- John Liddle as Heslep the Barkeeper
- Kris Lemche as Decker
- Dov Tiefenbach as Teeze
- Catherine Fitch as Louise
- Ceciley Jenkins as Claire
- Jennifer Baxter as Terri
- Josh Mostel as Mac McCreadle
- Mike Starr as Bobby Boulevard
- Charlotte Studey as Mckenze

== Release ==
The film premiered on September 8, 2001 at Oldenburg International Film Festival in Northwest Germany, three days before the September 11th attacks. The shots of the World Trade Center towers were kept in the film and never edited out. The film was released in Italy on November 30, 2001 and in the United States on October 11, 2002. It is highly likely this contributed to poor box office performance.

== Reception ==
Knockaround Guys received negative reviews from critics. It holds a 21% approval rating on the review aggregator website Rotten Tomatoes based on 101 reviews, with an average rating of 4.3/10. The website's consensus reads, "Well-acted, but it's too derivative." Metacritic, which uses a weighted average, assigned the film a score of 30 out of 100, based on 26 critics, indicating "generally unfavorable" reviews.

It also bombed at the box office, making less money than the cost of production. In its opening week in Italy, it grossed $302,273.
