= Wolf Girl (film) =

2001 film

- Directed by: Thom Fitzgerald
- Written by: Lori Lansens
- Produced by: J. Miles Dale
- Starring: Tim Curry; Victoria Sanchez; Grace Jones; Lesley Ann Warren
- Cinematography: Chris Manley
- Edited by: Joe Rabig
- Music by: Christophe Beck
- Production companies: The Kushner-Locke Company; Side Show Productions; Alliance Cinema
- Distributed by: Alliance Atlantis Home Video; Twentieth Century Fox Home Entertainment (DVD)
- Release date: 2001
- Running time: 97 minutes
- Countries: Canada; Romania
- Language: English

Wolf Girl (also known as Blood Moon) is a 2001 horror film directed by Thom Fitzgerald and written by Lori Lansens. An international co-production of Canada and Romania. The film was released in theaters in Canada and Romania, in the United States it was released directly to television and in Mexico it was released direct-to-video. It stars Tim Curry, Victoria Sanchez, Grace Jones, and Lesley Ann Warren. The film's plot concerns a girl who travels with a freak show because of her rare genetic disorder known as hypertrichosis.

== Plot ==
Born into a financially suffering traveling freak show circus, Tara works as the show's "Wolf Girl" due to her hypertrichosis. She is well loved by her fellow circus people, but is frequently ostracized by the local teens at the towns they visit. At their latest town she runs afoul of the town bullies but meets Ryan, a teenage boy whose mother is working on an experimental depilatory treatment. He helps Tara obtain the drug by stealing it from his mother's lab. Tara experiences favorable hair loss, but also begins to have strange dreams and exhibit feral-like behaviors. This is noticed by her fellow performers, however they keep quiet because the circus has become more financially stable after its host Harley notices that the town enjoys the more frightening aspects of the show. One of the town bullies, Beau, tries to kill Tara after she accidentally discovers that he has a micropenis. She kills him in self-defense and his body is discovered by the town.

Tara is forced to steal doses of the drug after Ryan tells her that he cannot obtain any more without his mother noticing. Later that night, under the influence of the drug, Tara attacks Harley during the show. Correctly assuming that she is responsible for Beau's death, the town forms a lynch mob. Fleeing into the forest, Tara sheds her clothes and attacks one of her bullies, Krystal, by ripping out her tongue, after Kystal, who doesn't recognize Tara's hairless form, tries to kiss her. They are found by Ryan, whose attempts at soothing Tara are foiled when she sees that he is carrying a gun. With the last of her humanity fading away, she implores Ryan to shoot her, but he refuses. A wolf appears and the film cuts away as a shot is fired. The circus is then shown leaving the town without Tara. It is also revealed that Ryan shot the wolf and turned in its corpse, which satisfies the townspeople as they believed that she was a true werewolf. The film ends with a feral, naked Tara walking on all fours through the woods, free from hypertrichosis, but at the cost of her humanity.

== Cast ==
- Victoria Sanchez as Tara the Wolf Girl
- Shelby Fenner as Krystal
- Shawn Ashmore as Beau
- Tony Denman as Cory
- Nate Dushku as Whiffer
- Dov Tiefenbach as Ryan Klein
- Tim Curry as Harley Dune
- Grace Jones as Christoph/Christine
- Darlene Cates as Athena the Fat Lady
- Lesley Ann Warren as Dr. Klein (Ryan's mother)
- Jordan Prentice as Fingers Finnian
- Petruta Panait as Olga the Rubber Girl
- Ana Maria Bazalan as Nadja the Rubber Girl
- Scott McClelland as The Amazing Pin Cushion
- Vasile Voinovici as The Human Tadpole
- Nelu Dinu as Hans the Human Torso
- Visinel as Buster the Crab Man
- Ioana Cristescu as Tara's mother

== Production ==
Filming for Wolf Girl took place in Romania. Tim Curry was brought on to portray the circus's ringleader Harley and Grace Jones was cast as one of the show's freaks.

== Release ==
Wolf Girl premiered on USA on October 16, 2001, after which it was released direct to video. It was released in Canada under the title Blood Moon.

== Reception ==
Critical reception has been mostly positive. John Leonard of New York Magazine called the film a "vulgar fun". IGN praised Wolf Girl for its acting and look, while also criticizing it for its "underdeveloped characters and spotty transition".

== See also ==
- Fedor Jeftichew
