= Darlene Cates =

American actress (1947–2017)

- Cates in What's Eating Gilbert Grape (1993)
- Born: Rita Darlene Guthrie; December 13, 1947; Borger, Texas, U.S.
- Died: March 26, 2017 (aged 69); Forney, Texas, U.S.
- Occupation: Actress
- Years active: 1992–2017
- Spouse: Robert Cates (m. 1963)
- Children: 3

Rita Darlene Cates (née Guthrie; December 13, 1947 – March 26, 2017) was an American actress. She became known for her role in the 1993 film What's Eating Gilbert Grape, in which she played the title character's housebound mother.

== Biography ==
Cates was born in Borger, Texas, on December 13, 1947, to a gas station attendant and a homemaker, who divorced when she was 12. She grew up in Dumas, Texas.

While her husband was deployed on two 13-month tours in Vietnam, Cates began eating as a comfort. In combination with a thyroid condition and slow metabolism, the overeating led to substantial weight gains. Pelvic infections caused by her excess weight kept her bedridden for two years, during which she gained an additional 149 pounds (68 kg), weighing almost 600 pounds (270 kg). Cates suffered from depression and suicidal thoughts, and lived in reclusion. She was prescribed Prozac, which she praised for "turning [her] life around."

In 1992, after receiving her high school diploma via correspondence courses, Cates ended her five-year period of seclusion, accepting an invitation to appear on the Sally show, in the episode "Too Heavy to Leave Their House". On the show, she discussed her battle with obesity and how it had affected her life.

In 2010, a series of health issues kept her hospitalized for nearly a year; by 2012, she had lost 240 pounds (110 kg) and wanted to resume her acting career.

== Career ==
After seeing her on the Sally show, screenwriter Peter Hedges offered Cates the role of a morbidly obese mother in the 1993 film What's Eating Gilbert Grape; the role was expanded after director Lasse Hallstrom learned she could act. At the time of filming, she was 520 pounds (240 kg). Her performance, her first attempt at acting, received critical acclaim and was lauded by her co-stars Leonardo DiCaprio and Johnny Depp.

Television roles followed on Picket Fences in 1994 and Touched by an Angel in 1996. She had a small role in the 2001 made-for-TV film Wolf Girl.

== Personal life and death ==
Cates met Robert Cates, a U.S. Marine, when she was 14 and the two married on January 11, 1963, when she was 15 and he was 25. Cates said she lied to Robert about her age, only revealing she was not 18 on the night before their wedding. They had one daughter and two sons and lived in Forney, Texas. Robert became a postal worker and the two remained married until her death.

Cates died in her sleep at age 69 on March 26, 2017. Her daughter announced her death in a Facebook post.

Upon learning of her death, Leonardo DiCaprio, who portrayed her son in What's Eating Gilbert Grape, posted a tribute on Facebook, stating that Cates was "the best acting mom [he] ever had the privilege of working alongside. Her endearing personality and incredible talent will live on in the memories of those who knew her, and those who loved her work."

== Filmography ==
=== Film ===
| Year | Title | Role | Notes |
|---|---|---|---|
| 1993 | What's Eating Gilbert Grape | Bonnie Grape | |
| 2014 | Mother | Mother | Short |
| 2017 | Billboard | Penny | (final film role), posthumous release |

=== Television ===
| Year | Title | Role | Notes |
|---|---|---|---|
| 1992 | Sally | Self | "Too Heavy to Leave Their House" |
| 1994 | Picket Fences | Sophie Wallace | "Squatter's Rights" |
| 1996 | Touched by an Angel | Claudia Bell | "Statute of Limitations" |
| 2001 | Wolf Girl | Athena the Fat Lady | TV film |
