= What's Eating Gilbert Grape =

- Theatrical release poster
- Directed by: Lasse Hallström
- Screenplay by: Peter Hedges
- Based on: What's Eating Gilbert Grape by Peter Hedges
- Produced by: Bertil Ohlsson; David Matalon; Meir Teper
- Starring: Johnny Depp; Juliette Lewis; Mary Steenburgen; Leonardo DiCaprio; John C. Reilly; Darlene Cates
- Cinematography: Sven Nykvist
- Edited by: Andrew Mondshein
- Music by: Alan Parker; Björn Isfält
- Production company: Matalon Teper Ohlsson
- Distributed by: Paramount Pictures (United States); J&M Entertainment (International)
- Release date: December 17, 1993
- Running time: 118 minutes
- Country: United States
- Language: English
- Budget: $11 million
- Box office: $10 million (US)

What's Eating Gilbert Grape is a 1993 American coming-of-age drama film directed by Lasse Hallström and starring Johnny Depp, Juliette Lewis, Mary Steenburgen, Leonardo DiCaprio and John C. Reilly. It follows a grocery store clerk living with his dysfunctional family, including his obese mother, his mentally disabled younger brother and two sisters in the fictional rural town of Endora, Iowa.

Peter Hedges wrote the screenplay, based on his 1991 novel. Filming took place from November 1992 to January 1993 in various parts of Texas.

The film was well received, with Depp's and DiCaprio's performances garnering critical acclaim. At age 19, DiCaprio received his first nominations for the Academy Award and Golden Globe Award for Best Actor in a Supporting Role.

== Plot ==
In the small, fictional town of Endora, Iowa, Gilbert Grape is busy caring for Arnie, his mentally disabled younger brother who is about to turn 18. They are watching tourists' trailers pass through town during an annual Airstreamers' Club gathering near the town.

Their father went bankrupt seventeen years earlier, and died by suicide two years later. Their mother Bonnie spends her days on the couch eating and watching television. Her obesity leaves her unable to care for the children on her own and Gilbert has taken on many of her responsibilities. He does repairs on the family house and is protective of Arnie, who often climbs trees and the town's water tower. Sisters Amy and Ellen help with the housework, but their oldest brother Larry has moved away. A new FoodLand supermarket has opened, threatening the small Lamson's Grocery where Gilbert works. Gilbert is also having an affair with a married woman to whom he delivers groceries.

A young woman named Becky and her grandmother are stuck in town when the International Harvester Travelall pulling their trailer breaks down. Gilbert begins a romance with Becky, and leaves Arnie alone in the bath to spend time with her. When he returns home late and finds Arnie still in the bath, shivering, he is guilt-ridden, the family is angry, and Arnie has developed aquaphobia. When Gilbert is again distracted by Becky, Arnie is arrested after scaling the water tower and requiring rescue. Bonnie leaves the house for the first time in seven years to demand Arnie's release at the police station.

As Arnie's 18th approaches, his behavior deteriorates, ruining two birthday cakes and refusing to bathe. Gilbert loses his patience, hits Arnie, then flees in his truck overcome by guilt. Arnie seeks help from Becky, who helps him overcome his fear of water. She then convinces Gilbert to return home for Arnie's 18th birthday party. He reconciles with his brother, his sisters, and his mother, and introduces Bonnie to Becky, something he had been reluctant to do.

Following the party, Bonnie climbs the stairs to her bedroom and sleeps in her bed for the first time since her husband's suicide. Arnie discovers her dead in the morning. Unable to remove her body, the police plan to return with a crane. To avoid a painful public spectacle, the family empties the house of their possessions, and Gilbert sets the house on fire, creating a funeral pyre for Bonnie.

A year later, Amy is managing a bakery in Des Moines and Ellen plans to switch schools and live in a bigger city. Gilbert and Arnie, about to turn nineteen, return to watch the tourist trailers come by. Becky and her grandmother stop to pick them up. Gilbert tells Arnie, "We can go anywhere."

== Cast ==
- Johnny Depp as Gilbert Grape
- Leonardo DiCaprio as Arnold "Arnie" Grape
- Juliette Lewis as Rebecca "Becky"
- Darlene Cates as Bonnie Grape
- Laura Harrington as Amy Grape
- Mary Kate Schellhardt as Ellen Grape
- Kevin Tighe as Kenneth "Ken" Carver
- Mary Steenburgen as Betty Carver
- John C. Reilly as Tucker Van Dyke
- Crispin Glover as Robert "Bobby" McBurney
- Penelope Branning as Becky's Grandma
- Libby Villari as the Waitress

== Production ==
Filming for What's Eating Gilbert Grape began on November 2, 1992, and concluded in late January 1993. It was shot in Texas, in various towns and cities; Austin and Pflugerville were primary locations, as well as Manor, where the water tower featured in the film was located. Corey Feldman has made claims that he was initially cast as Arnie, but was fired when Depp refused to work with him. These claims have never been substantiated. Christian Bale was up for the part of Arnie, but lost to DiCaprio.

Film Review quoted Leonardo DiCaprio:

I had to really research and get into the mind of somebody with a disability like that. So I spent a few days at a home for mentally ill teens. We just talked and I watched their mannerisms. People have these expectations that mentally retarded children are really crazy, but it's not so. It's refreshing to see them because everything's so new to them.

== Reception ==
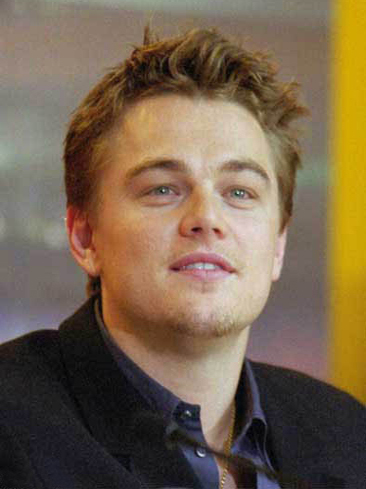
Leonardo DiCaprio's performance received widespread critical acclaim, garnering the then-19-year-old an Academy Award nomination for Best Supporting Actor, making him the seventh-youngest nominee in the category.

The film had a limited release on December 17, 1993, and wide release on March 4, 1994. The wide release garnered $2,104,938 in its first weekend. It was considered a box-office bomb, with the total domestic gross for the film of $10,032,765, although it achieved greater success on home video.

The film received positive reviews, with many critics praising the performances by Depp and DiCaprio. The latter was singled out for his performance in the film, many saying DiCaprio stole the film from lead actor Depp. On Rotten Tomatoes, the film was given a 90% score, and an average rating of 7.40/10, based on 51 reviews. The site's consensus states: "It's sentimental and somewhat predictable, but those are small complaints, given the tender atmosphere and moving performances at the heart of What's Eating Gilbert Grape." Metacritic calculated an average score of 73 out of 100, based on 20 reviews, indicating "generally favorable" reviews.

The New York Times film critic Janet Maslin praised DiCaprio's performance, writing, "The film's real show-stopping turn comes from Mr. DiCaprio, who makes Arnie's many tics so startling and vivid that at first he is difficult to watch... The performance has a sharp, desperate intensity from beginning to end."

Roger Ebert of the Chicago Sun-Times described it as "one of the most enchanting films of the year", and said DiCaprio deserved to win the Academy Award for Best Supporting Actor, for which he was nominated.

Todd McCarthy of Variety found the film a "bemused view on life", and remarked that "Depp manages to command center screen with a greatly affable, appealing characterization".

The Washington Post's Desson Howe thought that the film was an earnest but highly predictable effort.

Film Review praised Leonardo DiCaprio as the mentally disabled brother, calling it "a performance of astonishing innocence and spontaneity", bringing "a touching credibility to a very difficult part".

=== Year-end lists ===
- 2nd – David Elliott, The San Diego Union-Tribune
- 4th – Dan Craft, The Pantagraph
- 7th – Stephen Hunter, The Baltimore Sun
- Honorable mention – Duane Dudek, Milwaukee Sentinel
- Honorable mention – Steve Persall, St. Petersburg Times
- Honorable mention – Bob Carlton, The Birmingham News

=== Accolades ===
Awards
Award	Category	Recipients and nominees	Result
66th Academy Awards	Best Supporting Actor	Leonardo DiCaprio	Nominated
51st Golden Globe Awards	Best Supporting Actor – Motion Picture	Leonardo DiCaprio	Nominated
65th National Board of Review Awards	Best Supporting Actor Award	Leonardo DiCaprio	Won
Chicago Film Critics Association Awards 1993	Most Promising Young Actor	Leonardo DiCaprio	Won
1993 Los Angeles Film Critics Association Awards	New Generation Award	Leonardo DiCaprio	Won

== Home media ==
What's Eating Gilbert Grape was released on VHS on July 27, 1994, by Paramount Home Video. The film was released as a "special collector's edition" DVD from Paramount on June 20, 2006. The edition includes an audio commentary by director Lasse Hallström and writer Peter Hedges, as well as the featurettes, "The Characters of Gilbert Grape", "The Voice of Gilbert Grape" and "Why We Love Gilbert Grape".

It received a Blu-ray release on August 16, 2022.

== See also ==
- List of oldest and youngest Academy Award winners and nominees – Youngest nominees for Best Actor in a Supporting Role
