= Jack Hodgins (Bones) =

Dr. Jack Hodgins
- Bones character
- First appearance: September 13, 2005 (1x01, "Pilot")
- Last appearance: March 28, 2017 (12x12, "The End in the End")
- Created by: Hart Hanson
- Portrayed by: T. J. Thyne

In-universe information
- Nickname: Hodgepodge, Hodgie, The Bug and Slime Guy, King of the Lab, King of the Funeral, Thurston, Hodgekins, Curly, Bugboy (by Agent Booth)
- Gender: Male
- Title: Doctor (3 × Ph.D.)
- Occupation: Forensic Entomologist, Botanist & Mineralogist, heir to the Cantilever Group
- Family: Jonathan Hodgins III (Father); Anne Hodgins (Mother); Billy Gibbons (Father-in-law); Preston Alexander Hildenbrand III (maternal grandfather); Chester Putnam Hodgins (great-grandfather); Patrick (uncle); Jeffrey (brother)
- Spouse: Angela Montenegro (Wife; 2010–present)
- Children: Michael Staccato Vincent Hodgins (son, with Angela; born 2011)
- Religion: Episcopalian

Jonathan "Jack" Stanley Hodgins IV, Ph.D. is a character in the American television series, Bones. He is portrayed by T. J. Thyne. Hodgins is introduced to the series primarily as a forensic entomologist, as well as a botanist, mineralogist, forensic palynologist, and forensic chemist at the Jeffersonian Institute; his hobby is engaging in and discussing conspiracy theories.

During an investigation, he is primarily responsible for estimating the time of death and examining trace evidence and particulates. He is the boyfriend and eventual husband of forensic artist Angela Montenegro (Michaela Conlin), who also works at the Jeffersonian.

== Background and family ==
Hodgins comes from an especially wealthy family and is the sole heir to the fictional private corporation known as the Cantilever Group, although he hid his wealth from his coworkers for a long time.

Son of the late Jonathan and Anne Hodgins ("The Heiress in the Hill", season 9), Jack Hodgins is thought to have been an only child until he discovers in Season 9 that he has an older brother named Jeffrey, institutionalized with schizoaffective disorder. In "The Blonde in the Game", his uncle Preston is introduced. Hodgins' grandfather served as a "code-breaker" under Admiral Chester W. Nimitz during World War II. His family is the single largest donor to the Jeffersonian. In season 8, after serial killer and cyberterrorist Christopher Pelant (Andrew Leeds (actor)) hacks into Hodgins' savings and drains his bank accounts and the accounts of the entire Cantilever Group, he and Angela are forced to scrimp; yet, in season 9, he tells Dr. Lance Sweets (John Francis Daley) that he is content, as he still has his work at the Jeffersonian and family—the two things which he values the most.

Hodgins, like his coworker and best friend Zack Addy (Eric Millegan), was bullied in school: in elementary and middle school for being a "rich boy" and in high school for his small physical stature and poor social skills. He "managed to stand up for himself" on the last day of senior year, which Sweets believes to have given him closure.

Hodgins owns an original Mini, which FBI Agent Seeley Booth (David Boreanaz) jokingly calls a "toy car", although in later seasons he is seen driving a Toyota Prius as well. He is an experienced cave diver.

Although a noted conspiracy theorist, Hodgins temporarily abandons his paranoid thoughts and beliefs after it is revealed that Addy has become the most recent apprentice to a cannibalistic serial killer known as "Gormogon". Devastated by his friend's poor judgment, as well as his recent break-up with Angela, Hodgins finds his beliefs and feelings of paranoia turning into misanthropy. After being repeatedly confronted by Sweets about his behavior in the lab, Hodgins explains during a therapy session that he "hates everybody". Sweets determines that Hodgins' misanthropy is a way to cope with the overwhelming stresses in his life, and assures him that it will turn into something more pleasant in time.

In "Aliens in the Spaceship", in season 2, Hodgins advances the notion of a "King of the Lab". Hodgins and Zack, and, later, other interns, compete sporadically and informally for this informal title by trying to come up with particularly crucial items of evidence in various investigations.

Later in season 8, Hodgins loses his money when Pelant hacks his accounts while using the same computer system to target a military drone at a school in Afghanistan, forcing Hodgins to sacrifice his money by allowing the computer to keep running so that the team can focus their efforts on hacking the drone and stopping the destruction of the school. In "The Maiden in the Mushrooms", after using the last of intern Finn Abernathy's (Luke Kleintank) late grandmother's hot sauce, Hodgins deduces the ingredients and opens a side business called "Opie and Thurston's" to market a re-creation of the concoction. In season 10, in "The Eye in the Sky", Hodgins invents a packaging material and receives an advance of $2 million, restoring a portion of his wealth.

In Season 11, a bomb planted at a crime scene causes Hodgins such serious injuries that he is left permanently paralyzed from the waist down, with various subsequent episodes focusing on Hodgins adjusting to his new limitations and the team trying to help him cope. He experiences a few moments of movement, such as an involuntary muscle spasm in his leg, but the series ends with him still in his wheelchair, now acting as interim head of the lab.

== Work ==
Hodgins has three doctorates, in entomology, botany, and geology/mineralogy. He is known around the Jeffersonian as the "bug and slime guy" and Booth often calls him "bug boy", a reference to Hodgins' expertise in and affection for all insects in general. During an investigation, he primarily deals with particulates and trace evidence and determines the time of death by examining insect activity.

Hodgins eventually gets his own lab suite, known as the "Ookey Room", where he does most of his lab work, keeps his collection of arthropods, and performs most of his experiments. In episode 10 of season 4, "The Bones That Blew", Hodgins stated that his passion to "figure stuff out in amusing ways" was why he chose a career in science. In several episodes he has cooked edible food using the lab apparatus, much to his co-workers' bemusement.

== Characterization ==
Hodgins is one of the more sarcastic members of the group, and initially deals with some anger management issues. He also had some initial difficulty in working with Dr Goodman, the Jeffersonian's administrator, as Dr Goodman frequently used conjecture or imagination to make inferences about the victims of crimes. He is sometimes "the funny man" with a notable impression of the character Seeley Booth.

Hodgins is one of the more socially adept "squints" and uses pop-culture references and jokes that Dr. Temperance "Bones" Brennan (Emily Deschanel) and Zack Addy often fail to grasp. As such, he has little difficulty "translating" scientific terms into layman terms to Booth and is sometimes exasperated when Zack fails to understand a joke or quip.

Throughout the series, Hodgins has been known for his "insane conspiracy ravings", as Booth calls it, and in many of the show's early episodes his knowledge of conspiracy theories was demonstrated. In several cases, Booth, despite his disdain for most of Hodgins' conspiracy theories, uses it to his advantage for a case; in the episode "The Girl in Suite 2103" he asks Hodgins to call the FAA with his "craziest" conspiracy theory in order to stall a plane so the FBI can get to it in time to do a search. At the end of the episode when government agents come to take Hodgins away for questioning in relation to the hoax call, Booth declines to intervene telling Brennan that being taken away by "Men in Black" would be his dream come true.

Whenever different aspects of the government, such as the Department of Defense or the State Department, become involved in cases, Hodgins would often be the first to suggest that a cover-up is involved. In Seasons 9 and 10, his conspiracy theorist side comes to the fore and his theories often aid Booth and the team in finding clues in the major story arc in which the discovery of "The Ghost Killer" and the killer's connections lead the team to uncover a widespread and deeply rooted conspiracy going on in the FBI. By the time of "High Treason in the Holiday Season", Booth and Hodgins have reached a stage where Hodgins not only takes Booth's perspective on exposing cover-ups into account but Booth is willing to acknowledge Hodgins' own perspectives; when the case sees the team acquire a hard drive of classified NSA operations, Hodgins agrees with Booth that they can't expose the data on it because it would put the NSA agents at risk even if the operations are technically illegal.

== Relationships ==
=== Romantic ===
Angela Montenegro

After a few episodes of sexual tension, Hodgins takes Angela out on their first date to a park to play on swings. When he is buried alive with Brennan, Hodgins admits to being in love with Angela, saying "I'm nuts about Angela. Over the moon, stupid in love with her." Hodgins proposes to Angela twice before she turns the tables and proposes to him after he tells her that love is enough. Their wedding is cut short in the season two finale when a State Department official interrupts the ceremony because routine federal-employee background investigations have revealed that Angela is technically married to a Fijian man named Grayson Barasa (Sean Blakemore).

Hodgins and Angela hire a private investigator to locate Angela's husband, and the investigator finds Angela's husband, Grayson Barasa, living on No Name Key in Florida. Hodgins and Angela try to get Grayson to sign the divorce papers, but he refuses to sign, claiming he still loves Angela and has even built a house for himself and her. Hodgins and Angela realize that they may not fully trust each other, and end their relationship.

After their break-up, when he learns that Angela's father (ZZ Top's Billy Gibbons) is in town, Hodgins awakes in the middle of a desert with a bandage on his shoulder, which he removes to reveal a tattoo of Angela's face along with the words "Angie Forever".

After time apart, it is made clear that Hodgins still has feelings for Angela. After Booth is hospitalized for a brain tumor near the end of Season 4, Hodgins proposes giving his and Angela's relationship another chance. While, in Season 5, they seem to be just friends, there are still signs of romantic tension between the two. In the episode "The Tough Man in the Tender Chicken", Angela mentions to Hodgins that her required celibacy period will soon be over and seems to hint that she would like to break it with Hodgins; Hodgins turns her down, despite her insistence that she was implying no such thing. In "The X in the File", when Wendell Bray (Michael Grant Terry) tells Hodgins of his relationship with Angela, Hodgins is shown to be very upset and hurt. During the next episode, "The Proof in the Pudding", Angela has a pregnancy scare; during this time, Hodgins tells her that he loves her and that he will be there to support her and the baby. While the pregnancy test was revealed to be a false positive at the end of the episode, Angela still tells Hodgins that she is grateful for his support and will never forget it.

They are later imprisoned in "The Witch in the Wardrobe" for a variety of minor infractions by a local sheriff, which leads to remembrance of their happiness together. They both realize that they regret breaking up and share a passionate kiss. When a judge arrives to post their bail, they are finally married in a private ceremony in the jail cell. They announce their marriage to their colleagues soon after.

Upon their return from their honeymoon in Paris, it is revealed that they are expecting their first child, who will be named Temperance, if it's a girl, after Brennan. Angela's father wants to name their child "Staccato Mamba". Hodgins disagrees so he stands up to him and tells him "No". Finally he agrees with Angela and Hodgins on the names Katherine Temperance for a girl and Michael Joseph for a boy. Also in the end of the episode it is revealed that Hodgins got a tattoo of Angela's father on his other arm which reads "Dad".

In the episode "The Blackout in the Blizzard" Angela and Hodgins find out they are both carriers of Leber's Congenital Amaurosis, giving their baby a 25 percent chance of blindness. This is a huge devastation for the couple, but in the end they remind each other that they can handle anything together. Once the child is born, their son is confirmed to not be blind, and the two name him Michael Staccato Vincent Hodgins, named in honor of intern Vincent Nigel-Murray (Ryan Cartwright), who was murdered in a previous episode.

=== Colleagues ===
Hodgins' argumentative nature sometimes annoys his co-workers but he is on friendly terms with most of the team, including the interns. He was close to Zack Addy (who lived with Hodgins, renting the apartment above his garage) and would advise him on how to behave in a social setting, sometimes with humorously awkward results. Zack's social awkwardness and inability to understand Hodgins' sarcasm or pop culture references was sometimes a source of frustration, with Hodgins once calling the former a "dull Vulcan".

Of the interns, Hodgins is particularly close to Wendell Bray, Finn Abernathy and Arastoo Vaziri (Pej Vahdat). He initially had an awkward relationship with Wendell as the latter once dated Angela for a period of time and Angela had painted Wendell nude once. They later resolve the issue over time.

Hodgins and Arastoo frequently chat about sports, especially basketball and baseball, while examining remains in the lab. When Arastoo admitted to faking his accent as a cover for his religiousness, Hodgins was one of the first to accept him without reservations after Arastoo explained how he reconciles his religion (Islam) with science.

When Booth is appointed the FBI liaison to the Jeffersonian, Hodgins, who is anti-bureaucracy, was particularly hostile to him, especially for the early part of Season 1. Booth's military background, position as an FBI agent, and patriotism further add to the tension. In "Two Bodies in the Lab" Booth goes against protocol and allows Hodgins to go with him to rescue Brennan — albeit because Hodgins is the only person available to drive him to help Brennan — and their animosity subsides from then on. Despite their opposing views, they are on friendly terms, with Hodgins expressing genuine regret when a current investigation exposed a military cover-up as he recognized what their discoveries meant for Booth. Hodgins also asks for Booth's advice when he is planning to propose to Angela. Most notably, when Agent Payton Perotta (Marisa Coughlan) — who was officially working with the Jeffersonian on a case where Booth was a prime suspect and thus unable to serve as the lead investigator — commented that 'her' people had found some recent evidence in the case, Hodgins, along with intern Wendell automatically corrected her statement by saying that the squints were Booth's people. After Brennan, Hodgins is the 'squint' who has spent the most time out in the field with Booth — discounting Dr. Camille Saroyan (Tamara Taylor), who had prior experience working in law enforcement before joining the Jeffersonian — occasionally accompanying Booth when investigations require on-site particulate analysis.
