= T. J. Thyne =

American actor (born 1975)

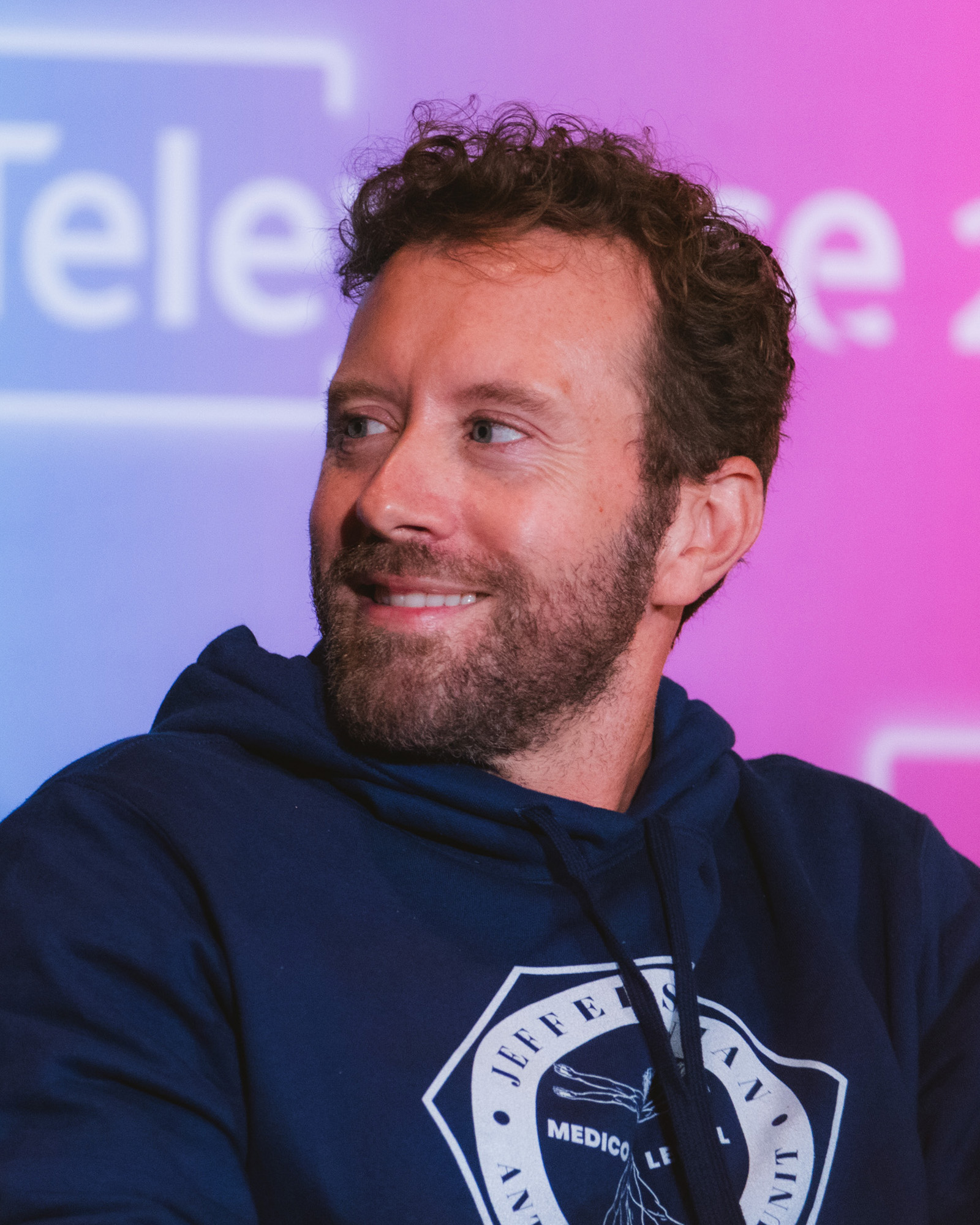
- Thyne in 2025
- Born: Thomas Joseph Thyne; March 7, 1975 (age 51); Stoughton, Massachusetts, U.S.
- Occupation: Actor
- Years active: 1995–present
- Website: www.tjthyne.com

Thomas Joseph Thyne (born March 7, 1975) is an American actor, best known for his role as Dr. Jack Hodgins in the television series Bones from 2005 to 2017.

== Early life and education ==
Thyne was born on March 7, 1975, in Stoughton, Massachusetts. He lived in Brockton, Hanover, and Hanson, before his family began moving around the country.

Thyne attended East Ridge Middle School in Ridgefield, Connecticut, before moving south to attend high school in Plano, Texas. He went on to attend the USC School of Dramatic Arts, graduating in 1997. In 2001, he co-founded Theatre Junkies, a group offering workshops and professional development for actors in the Greater Los Angeles Area.

== Personal life ==
In 2013, he became engaged to model Leah Park. Thyne and Park ended their relationship prior to 2019. He became engaged to his girlfriend Christine in Bali in January 2025. They were married in November the same year. Thyne was previously in a relationship with actress Vicki Davis.

== Filmography ==
=== Film ===
Year	Title	Role	Notes
1999	EDtv	Frat Guy	
1999	The Darwin Conspiracy	Dean	
2000	The Adventures of Rocky and Bullwinkle	Right-wing Student (uncredited)	
2000	Critical Mass	Karl Wendt	
2000	The Sky Is Falling	Kid	
2000	Erin Brockovich	David Foil	
2000	How the Grinch Stole Christmas	Stu Lou Who	
2000	What Women Want	Coffee Shop Customer	
2000	Preston Tylk	Art Casey	
2001	Heartbreakers	Bellhop	Uncredited
2001	Ghost World	Todd	
2001	How High	Gerald Picklestein	
2003	Something's Gotta Give	Waiter	
2004	Rent-A-Person	Photographer	Short film
2004	Raise Your Voice	Emcee	
2006	Getting Played	Hotel Desk Clerk	Cameo appearance/TV movie
2007	Validation	Hugh Newman	Lead role/co-producer/short film
2008	The Human Contract	Greg	Main cast
2008	Ball Don't Lie	Skinny Dude	Cameo appearance
2008	The Phone Book	Hugh Newman	Main cast/short film
2010	One Dry Run		Lead role/director/short film
2011	Shuffle	Lovell Milo	Lead role
2011	Stop	Man	Lead role/writer/director
2013	The Pardon	Father Richard	Main cast
2019	How High 2	Gerald Picklestein	

=== Television ===
Year	Title	Role	Notes
1998	Friends	Doctor Oberman	Episode: "The One Hundredth"
1998	Home Improvement	Young Man at the Front of the Bar	Episode: "Desperately Seeking Willow"
1998	Party of Five	Freshman Boy	Episode: "Moving On"
1998	Dharma & Greg	Dharma's store "newspaper visitor"	Episode: "Yes, We Have No Bananas (or Anything Else for That Matter)"
1999	Kenan & Kel	Hysterical Man	Episode: "Freezer Burned"
1999	Becker	Mr. Messinger	Episode: "Lucky Day"
2000	Early Edition	Leonard Culver	Episode: "Performance Anxiety"
2000	Titus	Brian, brother of Titus' ex-girlfriend Noelle	Episode: "The Last Noelle"
2000	Walker, Texas Ranger	Wallace "The Wizard" Slausen	4 episodes
2000	The Parkers	Man Getting Married	Episode: "Wedding Bell Blues"
2000	Just Shoot Me!	Jared	Episode: "Slamming Jack"
2001	The Tick	Kevin	Episode: "The Funeral"
2002	That 80's Show	Frank	Episode: "Tuesday Come Over"
2002	My Wife and Kids	Clothing Store Manager	Episode: "Open Your Heart"
2003	Grounded for Life	Waiter	Episode: "I Just Paid to Say I Love You"
2004	Boston Legal	Mark Shrum	Episode: "Truth to Be Told"
2004	Charmed	Whitelighter Danny	Episode: "Once in a Blue Moon"
2004	Nip/Tuck	Nightmare	Episode: "Trudy Nye"
2004	NCIS	Carl	Episode: "One Shot, One Kill"
2004	Cold Case	Kip Crowley (1985)	Episode: "Greed"
2004	My Wife and Kids	Pizza Delivery Guy	Episode: "Outbreak Monkey"
2004	Without a Trace	Duncan	Episode: "Light Years"
2004	CSI: Crime Scene Investigation	Bag Boy	Episode: "Paper or Plastic?"
2004	Jack & Bobby	Todd	Episode: "A Man of Faith"
2004	Angel	Lawyer	4 episodes
2004–2005	Huff	Neil	3 episodes
2005–2017	Bones	Dr. Jack Hodgins	Main cast
2005	24	Jason Gerard	Episode: "11:00 p.m. – 12:00 a.m."
2005	The O.C.	Larry Bernstein	1 episode
2005	My Wife and Kids	Bodhi the Retreat Manager	Episode: "Silence Is Golden"
2005	CSI: NY	Ron Lathem	Episode: "Tri-Borough"
2012	The Finder	Dr. Jack Hodgins	Episode: "Little Green Men"
2019	Law & Order: Special Victims Unit	Dr. Joshua Hensley	Episode: "Dearly Beloved"
2020	Grey's Anatomy	Aaron Morris	Episode: "All Tomorrow's Parties" Episode: "The Center Won't Hold"
2020	Gentefied	Tim the Landlord	3 episodes
2021	The Rookie	Mr. Edwards	Episode: "A.C.H."
2022	The Offer	Gordon Willis	Recurring role
2024	NCIS	Fletcher Voss	Episode: "A Thousand Yards"
2024	Chicago Med	Greg Sanders	Episode: "You Just Might Find you Get What you Need"
2025	High Potential	Barry Donovan	Episode: "The Sauna at the End of the Stairs"
2025	NCIS	Fletcher Voss	Episode: "Bad Blood"

=== Video games ===
Year	Title	Role	Notes
2022	Horizon Forbidden West	Morlund	

=== Web Series ===
Year	Title	Role	Notes
2026	Ace Combat 8: Wings of Theve - Hour Zero	Tony	Episode 3
