= Milan Cheylov =

Canadian television director/producer

- Occupations: Actor, film director, television director, film producer, television producer
- Years active: 1982–present
- Spouse: Lori Lansens
- Children: 2

Milan Cheylov is a Canadian television producer-director who was a producer and director of the drama 24.

== Career ==
Cheylov started as a professional actor at 15 and founded and ran Bootleg Theatre in Toronto for several years. He has produced five films and was EP/Director on Fox TV’s Rosewood and ABC’s Station 19. Originally from Toronto, Cheylov has directed over 150 episodes of television. Most recently he was executive producer and director of the Sony/Fox series Accused, and EP/director on the Fox series Murder in a Small Town.

== Personal life ==
Cheylov is married to author Lori Lansens. They have two children and live in Los Angeles.

== Filmography ==
=== Director ===
As a director, some of his television credits include:

- Street Legal
- Flash Forward
- The Famous Jett Jackson
- PSI Factor: Chronicles of the Paranormal
- Earth: Final Conflict
- Relic Hunter
- Monk
- The Chris Isaak Show
- The 4400
- Las Vegas
- Agents of S.H.I.E.L.D.
- Prison Break
- 24 (also supervising producer)
- Bones
- Person of Interest
- The Finder
- Once Upon a Time
- The Event
- Dexter
- Rizzoli & Isles
- Wisdom of the Crowd
- Station 19
- Deputy
- The Cleaning Lady
- FBI: International
- Accused
- Murder in a Small Town

=== Actor ===
Milan Cheylov film and television credits
Year	Title	Role	Notes
1984–1986	The Edison Twins	Lance	29 episodes
1985	Star Wars: Droids	Jann Tosh (voice)	5 episodes
1986, 1988	Night Heat	Wainright / Slash	2 episodes
1988	The Twilight Zone	Danny	1 episode
1988	Diamonds	Unknown	1 episode
1990	Counterstrike	Boris	Episode: "Mindbender" (S1.E17)
