= Callum Dunphy =

Canadian actor

- Born: Nova Scotia, Canada
- Occupations: Actor; writer
- Years active: 2015-present
- Known for: Sex & Violence; Splinters; Cam Boy
- Website: callumdunphy.com

Callum Dunphy is a Canadian actor and writer, originally from Nova Scotia. He's known for his recurring roles in the television series Sex & Violence (2015–17), Forgive Me Web Confessions (2016), and his lead roles in the drama film Splinters (2018), and in the OUTtv original series Cam Boy (2021–present).

== Career ==
He is most noted for his recurring role as Finn in the television series Sex & Violence, for which he was a Canadian Screen Award nominee for Best Supporting Actor in a Dramatic Series at the 4th Canadian Screen Awards in 2016.

He has also appeared in the television series Forgive Me and the web series I Am Syd Stone, and the films Stage Mother, Wildhood and Splinters, the latter earned him a nomination for Outstanding Male Actor in a Leading Role from the Nova Scotia chapter of the ACTRA Awards in 2019.

Currently, Dunphy stars as Aston, a broke broadway actor who turns into a sex worker during a global pandemic in the LGBTQ+ themed series Cam Boy from OUTtv.

== Filmography ==
Year	Title	Role	Notes	Ref.
2015–17	Sex & Violence	Finn	Recurring role (6 Episodes)	
2016	Forgive Me: Web Confessions	Jude	Episode: "Sodomy...?"; also writer	
2017	Titanically	Wallace	Heather Rankin Short music video	
2018	Splinters	Rob		
2018	Forgive Me	Jude	Recurring role (3 Episodes)	
2020	Stage Mother	Chappy		
2020	I Am Syd Stone	Colin	Episode: "Tell-all"	
2021	Wildhood	Ross		
2021	8:37 Rebirth	Young Redford		
2021–present	Cam Boy	Aston	Lead Role; also writer	
2022	Sugar Highs	Bartholomew	Recurring Role (Season 1); also script consultant	
TBA	Fallen Angel End-Times	Lucifer	Post-production	
TBA	Monster	Lou	Post-production	

== Awards and nominations ==
List of awards and nominations received by Callum Dunphy
Award	Year	Category	Nominated work	Result	Ref.
ACTRA Awards	2019	Outstanding Male Actor in a Leading Role	Splinters	Nominated	
Canadian Screen Awards	2016	Best Performance by an Actor in a Featured; Supporting Role in a Dramatic Program or Series	Sex & Violence	Nominated	
