= Thom Fitzgerald =

American film director

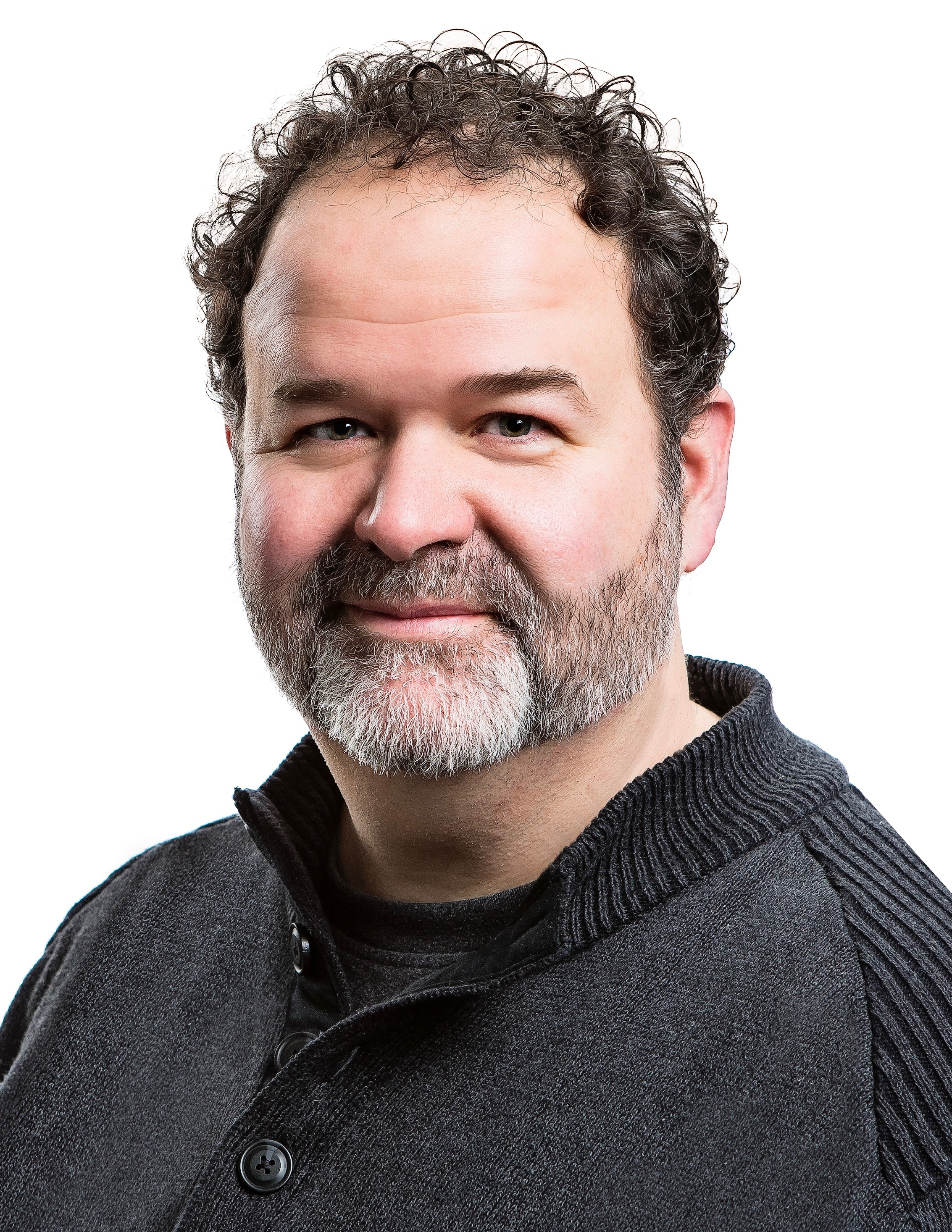
- Born: Thomas Fitzgerald; July 8, 1968 (age 58); New Rochelle, New York, U.S.
- Occupations: Film director, film producer, screenwriter, playwright
- Years active: 1997–present

Thomas "Thom" Fitzgerald (born July 8, 1968) is an American-Canadian film and theatre director, screenwriter, playwright and producer.

== Life ==
Fitzgerald was born and raised in New Rochelle, New York. His parents divorced when he was five years old. He moved with his mother and brother, Timothy Jr., to Bergenfield, New Jersey, where he was raised and graduated from Bergenfield High School. While pursuing his university degree in Manhattan at the Cooper Union for the Advancement of Science and Art, he spent a semester as an exchange student at the Nova Scotia College of Art and Design, and permanently moved to Halifax after completing his studies.

Fitzgerald continues to reside in Nova Scotia. He has described himself as a "struggling Catholic".

== Career ==
In Canada, Fitzgerald worked extensively as a trio with performance artists Renee Penney and Michael Weir for several years as the Charlatan Theatre Collective.

=== The Hanging Garden ===
He launched his career in film, releasing his debut feature The Hanging Garden in 1997. The film, which Fitzgerald described as having some loosely autobiographical elements as it centred on a teenager who, like Fitzgerald, was gay and driven to consider suicide, starred Troy Veinotte, Chris Leavins and Kerry Fox. That film won several Genie Awards, including acting awards for Peter MacNeill and Seana McKenna, and a screenplay award for Fitzgerald. It also garnered Fitzgerald the Claude Jutra Award for best feature film by a first-time director, the FIPRESCI European Critics Prize, Best Canadian Film Prize at the Atlantic Film Festival, Best Canadian Film at the Vancouver Film Festival, Best Screenplay at the Mar del Plata Festival, and a number of other awards. The film made its U.S. debut at the Sundance Film Festival.

=== Beefcake ===
His second project, which was in progress before The Hanging Garden, was the muscle magazine docu-comedy Beefcake (1999). The story of fitness photographer Bob Mizer (played by Daniel MacIvor) and the wave of fitness magazines in the 1950s, it was commissioned for television by Channel 4 in the UK and Arte in France and Germany. However, the movie was too racy for North American television in 1999, and instead was released theatrically by Strand Releasing. The film debuted at Sundance and garnered four Genie Award nominations. Jonathan Torrens won the Best Supporting Actor Award from ACTRA, the Canadian equivalent of SAG.

=== Wolf Girl ===
Wolf Girl (2001) was a Halloween special for the USA Network starring Tim Curry, Victoria Sanchez, Lesley Ann Warren, Darlene Cates, Grace Jones, Shelby Fenner and Shawn Ashmore. Penned by novelist Lori Lansens, the story spins the werewolf genre in reverse, as cosmetic treatments render a furry side-show performer (Sanchez) progressively more psychotic.

=== The Wild Dogs ===
The Wild Dogs (2002) is a digitally shot ensemble drama set in contemporary Bucharest. The stories involve a reluctant dogcatcher (Mihai Calota), a diplomat with prostate cancer (David Hayman), and a touring pornographer (played by Thom Fitzgerald). Rachel Blanchard and Alberta Watson co-star. The Wild Dogs debuted at the Toronto Film Festival. Along with three Genie nominations, including Best Supporting Actor for Hayman, The Wild Dogs won the Best Canadian Film Award at the Atlantic Film Festival and the Emerging Master Award at the Seattle International Film Festival.

=== The Event ===
The Event (2003), tells the story of Matt, a New Yorker with AIDS (Don McKellar) who has died mysteriously. Parker Posey plays an attorney who takes her investigation personally, pushing his family (Olympia Dukakis, Sarah Polley, Dick Latessa) and friends (Brent Carver, Rejean Cournoyer, Jane Leeves) into stark confessions about the reality of Matt's demise. Thom appeared in the film as Vagimar Director. The low-budget film debuted at Sundance Film Festival, opening to praise. It received numerous awards, including the Siegessäule Reader's Award, the Teddy Award at the Berlin International Film Festival, an ACTRA Supporting Actor Award for Rejean Cournoyer, the Outfest Jury Prize for Best Actress for Dukakis, a Best Supporting Actress Genie nomination for Dukakis, and Atlantic Film Festival Awards for Fitzgerald, writers Tim Marback and Steven Hillyer, and actress Joan Orenstein.

=== 3 Needles ===
3 Needles (2005) tells three short stories about the global HIV pandemic. In the first, Lucy Liu stars as a blood smuggler who unleashes havoc on a farmer's family. In the second story, a second rate porn actor in Montreal (Shawn Ashmore), hides his HIV status from his mother (Stockard Channing). In the third story, three Christian missionaries (Chloë Sevigny, Olympia Dukakis and Sandra Oh) barter with a South African plantation owner (Ian Roberts) to help a family of orphans. The film has won awards for cinematographer Tom Harting as well as Fitzgerald's direction at the Atlantic Film Festival, and it garnered Fitzgerald a Director's Guild nomination for Best Direction of a Feature Film. The director received promotional support from the United Nations' Global Media AIDS initiative, and the film was released on December 1 (World AIDS Day), 2006, in selected theaters and on Showtime Network.

=== Cloudburst ===
In 2010, Fitzgerald's first full-length play Cloudburst debuted in Halifax at Plutonium Playhouse. Critics called the play "a knock-out" and "the best thing to happen to the Halifax theatre scene in a decade" Cloudburst won the 2011 Merritt Award for Best New Play. Fitzgerald shot a film version of Cloudburst in 2011 starring Olympia Dukakis, Brenda Fricker and Ryan Doucette. The film debuted at the 2011 Atlantic Film Festival and won an Atlantic Canada Award for Best Screenplay and the People's Choice Audience Award for Best Film of the Festival. It also won the Audience Award for Best Film at Cinéfest Sudbury International Film Festival, the Audience Award for Best Canadian Indie Film at Edmonton International Film Festival, Top Ten Canadian Film at Vancouver International Film Festival, and Best Film at Image+Nation Montreal Film Festival. It won a Best Canadian Film Award at Victoria Film Festival. It won a Grand Jury Prize at the Atlanta Film Festival. Cloudburst won film festival prizes worldwide, including audience awards in Copenhagen, Barcelona, Hannover, Waterloo and other cities.

=== Splinters ===
The 2018 film Splinters, an adaptation of the play by Lee-Anne Poole, premiered at the Toronto International Film Festival.

== Filmography ==
Year	Film (Director)
1997	The Hanging Garden
1999	Beefcake
2001	Wolf Girl
2002	The Wild Dogs
2003	The Event
2005	3 Needles
2011	Cloudburst
2018	Splinters
2020	Stage Mother

Year	Television
2010	The Gospel According to the Blues
2013	Forgive Me
2013	Sex & Violence
2021	Cam Boy
2022	Sugar Highs

Year	Film (Producer/Executive Producer)
2008	Growing Op
2012	Blackbird
2015	North Mountain
2021	Shush
2024	To the Moon

== Quotes ==
- "Writing and directing is simply about recreating 2,000 little moments from life that you observed."
- "I'm not at a fork in the road. I'm at an eggbeater in the road."
- "I see comedy everywhere. That's how I live day to day. I try to laugh and see the ironies and hopefulness in life, even in the saddest things. They're one and the same in their extremes. If you've ever seen someone truly happy, ecstatically happy, it is indistinguishable from grief."

== Awards ==
- Academy of Television Arts and Sciences, Ribbon of Hope Award, 3 Needles
- Academy of Canadian Cinema and Television Genie Award (win), Thom Fitzgerald, Best Screenplay, The Hanging Garden
- Academy of Canadian Cinema and Television Genie Award (nom), T. Fitzgerald, L. Garfield, A. Gelbart, Best Picture, The Hanging Garden
- Academy of Canadian Cinema and Television Genie Award (nom), Thom Fitzgerald, Best Achievement in Direction, The Hanging Garden
- Academy of Canadian Cinema and Television Canadian Screen Award (nom), Thom Fitzgerald, Best Writing in a Dramatic Series, Forgive Me
- Academy of Canadian Cinema and Television Canadian Screen Award (nom), Thom Fitzgerald, Best Direction in a Dramatic Series, Sex & Violence
- Athens Outview Film Festival, Jury Award, Thom Fitzgerald, Best Film, Cloudburst
- Atlanta Film Festival Pink Peach Feature Grand Jury Prize, Cloudburst
- Atlanta Out on Film Festival Audience Award for Best Overall Feature, Cloudburst
- Atlanta Out on Film Jury Award for Best Film, Cloudburst
- Atlanta Out on Film Jury Award for Best Actress, Olympia Dukakis
- Atlantic Film Festival, Goldstar Award (win), Thom Fitzgerald, Most Promising Filmmaker, The Movie of the Week
- Atlantic Film Festival, Atlantic Canadian Award (win), Thom Fitzgerald, Best Editing The Movie of the Week
- Atlantic Film Festival, Atlantic Canadian Award (win), Thom Fitzgerald, Best Special Effects, The Movie of the Week
- Atlantic Film Festival, Audience Award (win), Thom Fitzgerald, Best Film, The Hanging Garden
- Atlantic Film Festival, Canadian Award (win), Thom Fitzgerald, Best Canadian Film, The Hanging Garden
- Atlantic Film Festival, Atlantic Canadian Award (win), Thom Fitzgerald, Best Direction The Hanging Garden
- Atlantic Film Festival, Best Atlantic Film Award (win), Thom Fitzgerald, The Hanging Garden
- Atlantic Film Festival, Atlantic Canadian Award (win), Thom Fitzgerald, Best Direction, The Wild Dogs
- Atlantic Film Festival, Canadian Award (win), Thom Fitzgerald, Best Canadian Film, The Wild Dogs
- Atlantic Film Festival, Atlantic Canadian Award (win), Thom Fitzgerald, Best Direction, The Event
- Atlantic Film Festival, Atlantic Canadian Award (win), Thom Fitzgerald, Best Screenplay, The Event
- Atlantic Film Festival, Atlantic Canadian Award (win), Thom Fitzgerald, Best Direction, 3 Needles
- Atlantic Film Festival, Atlantic Canadian Award (win), Thom Fitzgerald, Best Screenplay, Cloudburst
- Atlantic Film Festival, Audience Award (win), Thom Fitzgerald, Best Film, Cloudburst
- Atlantic Fringe Festival, Fringe Hit! Award, Charlatan Theatre Collective, Bed and (Maybe) Breakfast
- Atlantic Fringe Festival, Fringe Hit! Hot Ticket Award, Plutonium Playhouse, The Barnacle's Tale
- Atlantic Fringe Festival, Jury Award for Fringiest Fringe Show, Plutonium Playhouse, The Barnacle's Tale
- Barcelona International Gay & Lesbian Film Festival Audience Award for Best Film, Cloudburst
- Berlin International Film Festival, Reader Jury of the "Siegessäule" Award, Thom Fitzgerald, The Event
- Birmingham UK Shout Festival Audience Award for Best Film, Thom Fitzgerald, Cloudburst
- Cinéfest Sudbury International Film Festival, Audience Choice Award for Best Film (win), Thom Fitzgerald, Cloudburst
- Claude Jutra Award, Thom Fitzgerald, The Hanging Garden
- CNKY Cincinnati Kentucky BLGT Film Festival Best Feature Film Award, Cloudburst
- Copenhagen MIX Copenhagen Film Festival Audience Award for Best Film, Cloudburst
- Directors Guild of Canada Award (nom, Thom Fitzgerald, Outstanding Direction Feature, 3 Needles
- Edmonton International Film Festival, Audience Choice Award for Best Canadian Film (win), Thom Fitzgerald, Cloudburst
- Golden Trailer Awards (nom), Golden Trailer, Best Independent, The Event
- GLAAD Media Awards (nom), Outstanding Film (Limited Release), The Hanging Garden
- Hannover, Germany Queer Film Festival, Audience Award for Best Film, Cloudburst
- Image+Nation Montreal GLBT Film Festival, Best Feature Film Award, Thom Fitzgerald, Cloudburst
- Indianapolis LGBT Film Festival, Audience Award, Best Overall Film, Thom Fitzgerald, The Event
- Indianapolis LGBT Film Festival, Audience Award for Best Lesbian Film, Thom Fitzgerald, Cloudburst
- Kingston Reelout Film Festival, Audience Award, Best Narrative Feature, Thom Fitzgerald, Cloudburst
- Mar del Plata Film Festival Best Screenplay, Thom Fitzgerald, The Hanging Garden
- Mix Milano Film Festival Grand Jury Award for Best Film, Thom Fitzgerald, Cloudburst
- New York AIDS Film Festival, Bertha Meka's Award, 3 Needles
- New Zealand Out Takes Film Festival, Audience Award for Best Feature, Thom Fitzgerald, Cloudburst
- North Carolina Gay and Lesbian Film Festival Audience Award for Best Feature, Thom Fitzgerald, Cloudburst
- Philadelphia QFest Audience Award for Best Feature Film, Thom Fitzgerald, Cloudburst
- Portia White Prize Shortlist, 2011
- Portia White Prize, 2012
- Rainbow Reels Film Festival People's Choice Award for Best Feature, Thom Fitzgerald, Cloudburst
- Robert Merritt Award for Best New Play, Thom Fitzgerald, Cloudburst
- Robert Merritt Award (nom) for Outstanding Production, Plutonium Playhouse, Cloudburst
- Robert Merritt Award (nom) for Outstanding Set Design, Thom Fitzgerald, Cloudburst
- Sacramento Gay & Lesbian Film Festival, Audience Award for Best Film, Thom Fitzgerald, Cloudburst
- San Diego FilmOut, Audience Award for Best Feature Film, Thom Fitzgerald, Cloudburst
- San Diego FilmOut, Jury Award for Best Feature Film, Thom Fitzgerald, Cloudburst
- San Diego FilmOut, Jury Award for Best Direction, Thom Fitzgerald, Cloudburst
- San Francisco Frameline Festival Audience Award for Best Film, Thom Fitzgerald, Cloudburst
- Seattle International Film Festival Emerging Master Showcase Award, The Event and The Wild Dogs
- Screen Nova Scotia Award nomination for Best TV Series, Thom Fitzgerald, Doug Pettigrew, Forgive Me
- Southwest Gay and Lesbian Film Festival Audience Award for Best Feature, Thom Fitzgerald, Cloudburst
- St. Louis QFest, Audience Award for Best Film, Thom Fitzgerald, Cloudburst
- Sudbury Cinefest Best Canadian Film Award, Thom Fitzgerald, The Hanging Garden
- Taos Talking Pictures Film Festival, Taos Land Grant Award (nom), Thom Fitzgerald, The Wild Dogs
- Toronto International Film Festival, People's Choice Award, Thom Fitzgerald, The Hanging Garden
- Toronto International Film Festival, Best Canadian Feature Film, Thom Fitzgerald, The Hanging Garden
- Troia International Film Festival, FIPRESCI Prize, Thom Fitzgerald, The Hanging Garden
- Troia International Film Festival, Prize of the City of Grandola, Thom Fitzgerald, The Hanging Garden
- Vancouver International Film Festival, Most Popular Canadian Film, Thom Fitzgerald, The Hanging Garden
- Vancouver International Film Festival Best Canadian Screenplay, Thom Fitzgerald, The Hanging Garden
- Vancouver International Film Festival Audience Choice Top Ten Canadian Films, Thom Fitzgerald, Cloudburst
- Verzaubert International Gay & Lesbian Film Festival, Rosebud (nom), Thom Fitzgerald, Beefcake
- Victoria Film Festival, Best Canadian Film, Thom Fitzgerald, Cloudburst
- Writers Guild of Canada, award nomination, Thom Fitzgerald, Sex & Violence for the episode "Surface Scars"
