= Mike McLeod (actor) =

Canadian film and television actor (born 1985)

- Born: September 4, 1985 (age 41); London, Ontario
- Occupation: actor
- Years active: 2000s-present
- Known for: Forgive Me

Mike McLeod is a Canadian film and television actor, best known for his performance as The Priest in the television series Forgive Me.

Originally from London, Ontario, he is the son of lawyer and University of Western Ontario law professor James McLeod and Ontario Superior Court justice Margaret McSorley. McLeod moved to Halifax, Nova Scotia in 2003 to attend Dalhousie University. His play Good For Nothings was staged in 2013.

He received a Canadian Screen Award nomination for Best Actor in a Drama Series at the 3rd Canadian Screen Awards in 2015 for his work on Forgive Me. From 2015 through 2017, he won a record-breaking three back to back ACTRA Awards for Best Lead Actor for his role as The Priest in Forgive Me.

He has also had supporting roles in the television series Sex & Violence, Haven, The Flash, The Man in the High Castle, the web series Moderation Town and Forgive Me Web Confessions and the short film Argus.
