= Jennie Raymond =

Canadian film and television actress

- Occupation: actress
- Years active: 1990s-present
- Known for: Sex & Violence, Chapelwaite ( Epix series) Pit Pony, Blue Murder

Jennie Raymond is a Canadian film and television actress, best known for her three time Canadian Screen Award-nominated for best actress in a leading role and her two wins ACTRA Awardperformance in the drama series Sex & Violence. She won a Gemini Award for Best Performance by an Actress in a Featured Supporting Role in a Dramatic Series at the 18th Gemini Awards for her recurring role in Blue Murder.

Originally from Halifax, Nova Scotia, she has a BA and is a graduate of the professional theatre programDalhousie University and attended The Royal Academy of Dramatic Arts summer program She has also had stage roles in Halifax, most prominently with the city's Shakespeare by the Sea festival.

In addition to Sex & Violence and Blue Murder, she has also been a lead or had guest star roles in the television series The Associates, Show Me Yours, Haven, Pit Pony and Forgive Me, and the films Love and Death on Long Island, Charlie Zone and Night Blooms and Chapelwaite starring Adrian Brody.

== Awards ==
Awards and Nominations
Year	Awards	Group	Film	Result
2018	ACTRA Award	Best Actress in a Lead Role	Sex & Violence	Won
2018	ACTRA Award	Best Actress in a Lead Role	Pearls	Nominated
2018	Canadian Screen Award	Best Actress in a Leading Role, Dramatic Series	Sex & Violence	Nominated
2016	ACTRA Award	Best Actress in a Lead Role	Sex & Violence	Won
2016	Canadian Screen Award	Best Actress in a Leading Role, Dramatic Series	Sex & Violence	Nominated
2015	ACTRA Award	Best Actress in a Lead Role	Sex & Violence	Nominated
2015	Canadian Screen Award	Best Actress in a Leading Role, Dramatic Series	Sex & Violence	Nominated
2003	Gemini Award	Best Actress in a Supporting Role, Dramatic Series	Blue Murder	Won
