= Stage Mother =

Stage Mother may refer to:

- Stage mother, term describing mother of a child actor
- Stage Mother (1933 film), American pre-code drama from MGM
- Stage Mother (2020 film), Canadian comedy-drama
