= The Event (2003 film) =

Drama film directed by Thom Fitzgerald

- Directed by: Thom Fitzgerald
- Written by: Thom Fitzgerald; Steven Hillyer; Tim Marback
- Produced by: Bryan Hofbauer
- Starring: Brent Carver; Olympia Dukakis; Jane Leeves; Don McKellar; Sarah Polley; Parker Posey
- Cinematography: Tom Harting
- Edited by: Christopher Cooper
- Music by: Christophe Beck
- Distributed by: THINKFilm
- Release dates: January 19, 2003 (Sundance Film Festival); October 3, 2003 (United States)
- Running time: 110 minutes
- Countries: Canada; United States
- Language: English

The Event is a 2003 drama film directed by Thom Fitzgerald. Matt Shapiro (Don McKellar), a cellist with AIDS, has died in Manhattan after a party, and his partner Brian (Brent Carver) is suspected of having assisted suicides of Matt and other AIDS patients. Assistant District Attorney Nick DeVivo (Parker Posey) interviews Matt's friends and family who attended to piece together a portrait of the final two years of Matt's life, which are told in flashbacks.

The ultra-low-budget film stars an ensemble of respected actors including Olympia Dukakis, Sarah Polley, Dick Latessa, Joanna P. Adler, Jane Leeves, Rejean Cournoyer, Joan Orenstein, McKellar, Posey, and Carver. Written by Steven Hillyer and Tim Marback with director Fitzgerald, it was produced by Bryan Hofbauer, Vicki McCarty (exec), Robert Flutie (exec). ThinkFilm distributed the film in the U.S.

The Event premiered at the Sundance Film Festival where it received three standing ovations; the critical reception did not match this level of enthusiasm. Critics praised the actors' performances—especially that of Dukakis as Matt's mother, Lila—but criticized the film for its heavy-handed treatment of the nuances in assisted suicide. Scott Foundas of IndieWire expressed disappointment that instead of an "acidly comic take on death and its aftermath", The Event was "unrelentingly unpleasant, impossibly maudlin...pedantic, preachy...of noble intent, but with little genuine feeling". Writing for The New York Times, Stephen Holden criticized the "far too schematic" screenplay for flattening the ethical dilemmas of assisted suicide. Concurring, Exclaim!'s Allan Tong added that the film failed to induce sympathy for Matt: "there's a lot of talk about Matt's excruciating treatments, but we see very little of them". In contrast, Kevin Thomas of the Los Angeles Times praised various aspects of the film, from the acting to the direction and writing, and highlighted how it "celebrates, of all things, mother love, an enduring staple of foreign cinema but rarely touched upon so effectively in English-language films".

== Cast ==
- Joanna Adler (billed as Joanna P. Adler) as Gaby Shapiro-Schnell
- Brent Carver as Brian Knight
- Rejean Cournoyer (billed as Réjean Joseph Cournoyer) as Rory Metzler
- Olympia Dukakis as Lila Shapiro
- Glen Michael Grant as Andy Campbell
- Dick Latessa as Uncle Leo
- Jane Leeves as Mona Rothchild
- Gianna Marciante as Lilian Schnell
- Jaclyn Markowitz as Amelia Schnell
- Vicky McCarty as Princess Leia Kapui Schwartz
- Don McKellar as Matt Shapiro
- Joan Orenstein as Angela DeVivo
- Sarah Polley as Dana Shapiro
- Parker Posey as Nick Devivo
- Cynthia Preston as Amy Eisner
- Chaz Thorne as Chris Devivo
- Christina Zorich as Judy Campbell

== Awards ==
- ACCTV Genie Award (nominated)—Olympia Dukakis, Best Actress in a Supporting Role
- Atlantic Film Festival, Atlantic Canadian Award (win)—Thom Fitzgerald, Best Direction
- Atlantic Film Festival, Atlantic Canadian Award (win)—S. Hillyer, T. Marback, Best Screenplay
- Atlantic Film Festival, Atlantic Canadian Award (win)—D'Arcy Poultney, Best Art Direction
- Atlantic Film Festival, Atlantic Canadian Award (win)—Christopher Cooper, Best Editing
- Atlantic Film Festival, Atlantic Canadian Award (win)—Joan Orenstein, Best Actress
- ACTRA Awards, ACTRA Maritimes Award Outstanding Male Performance, Rejean Cournoyer
- Berlin International Film Festival, Teddy Award: Reader Jury of the "Siegessäule" Award, Thom Fitzgerald
- Golden Trailer Awards (nominated)—Golden Trailer, Best Independent
- Indianapolis LGBT Film Festival—Audience Award, Best Overall Film
- L.A. Outfest—Grand Jury Award, Outstanding Actress, Olympia Dukakis
- Seattle International Film Festival Emerging Master Showcase Award—The Event and The Wild Dogs
