= Lee Majdoub =

Lebanese actor

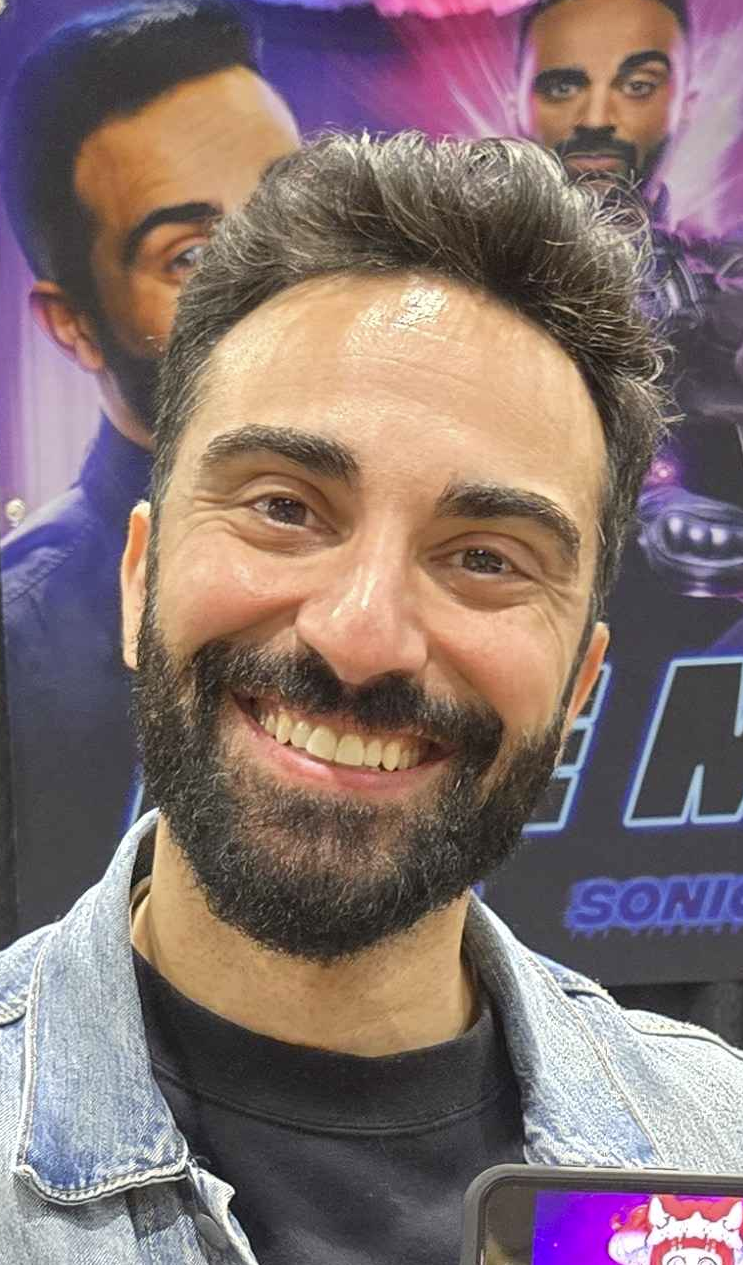
- Majdoub in 2026
- Born: May 31, 1982 (age 44); Tripoli, Lebanon
- Education: California State University, Long Beach (BS)
- Occupations: Actor; writer; producer
- Years active: 2007–present

Lee Majdoub (Arabic: لي مجدوب; born May 31, 1982) is a Lebanese-Canadian actor, writer, and producer. He is best known for his role as Agent Stone in the Sonic the Hedgehog franchise. Majdoub also played Ash Ketchum in the fan-made short film Pokémon Apokélypse (2010), and has appeared in the television programs The 100 and Dirk Gently's Holistic Detective Agency. In 2023, he portrayed Basim Ibn Ishaq, the protagonist of the video game Assassin's Creed Mirage by Ubisoft.

== Early life ==
Majdoub was born in Tripoli, Lebanon. He lived in Italy and Switzerland as a child before moving to Ottawa, Canada, at 9 years old. His family moved to Montreal. He graduated from California State University, Long Beach with a Bachelor of Science, Mechanical Engineering in 2005. At his sister's suggestion, Majdoub began taking acting classes when he was 20 years old while completing his studies.

== Career ==
Majdoub's first screen role was a small part in the 2007 television series Bionic Woman. He continued acting with small roles in film and television. Through the early to mid-2010s Majdoub appeared in guest roles in Arrow, Once Upon a Time, Unreal, and Supernatural. During this period Majdoub was cast as Carter in See No Evil 2 directed by Jen and Sylvia Soska. He worked with the Soska sisters again in their segment for ABCs of Death 2.

In 2013, Majdoub performed in a Belfry Theatre production of the play Helen's Necklace. In 2015, he appeared in the Belfry Theatre's production of Vanya and Sonia and Masha and Spike.

In 2017, he appeared in the second season of Dirk Gently's Holistic Detective Agency as Silas Dengdamor. He won "Best Male Guest Performance in a Dramatic Series" for his performance at the 2018 Leo Awards. Beginning in 2019, Majdoub played recurring roles in You Me Her and The 100. He was again nominated for "Best Guest Performance by a Male in a Dramatic Series" for his work on You Me Her at the 2020 Leo Awards, and again in the same category at the 2021 Leo Awards for his work on The 100.

In September 2018, Majdoub was cast in the live-action Sonic the Hedgehog film as Agent Stone. Upon release, Majdoub's character became popular with fans of the franchise who highlighted his dynamic with Jim Carrey's Doctor Robotnik. He would go on to reprise the role in Sonic the Hedgehog 2 (2022) and Sonic the Hedgehog 3 (2024).

In September 2022, Majdoub announced that he would be voice acting Basim Ibn Ishaq, the protagonist of the video game Assassin's Creed Mirage, replacing Carlo Rota, who voiced an older Basim in Assassin's Creed Valhalla.

Majdoub joined the Prime Video series Upload in 2024 for the show's fourth and final season.

== Filmography ==
=== Film ===
Year	Title	Role	Notes
2010	Tainted	Detective 1	
2010	Pokémon Apokélypse	Ash Ketchum	Fan-made short film
2012	Underworld: Awakening	Desk Guard #1	
2013	One Foot in Hell	Sanjay	TV movie
2013	One Night in Seattle	The Wine Guy	
2013	Baby Sellers	Akshay	TV movie
2013	If I Had Wings	Construction Foreman	
2014	ABCs of Death 2	Office Temp	
2014	See No Evil 2	Carter	
2015	Mix	Vic	TV movie
2016	Dead Rising: Endgame	Stark	
2016	Brain on Fire	Guy	
2017	The Mountain Between Us	Translator	
2018	Dumbbells	Tom	TV movie
2019	Benchwarmers 2: Breaking Balls	Kashmir	
2019	Puppet Killer	Simon / Curtis	
2020	Sonic the Hedgehog	Agent Stone	
2022	Sonic the Hedgehog 2	Agent Stone	
2024	Get Fast	Sly	
2024	Sonic the Hedgehog 3	Agent Stone	
2027	Sonic the Hedgehog 4	Agent Stone	Post-production

=== Television ===
Year	Title	Role	Notes
2007	Bionic Woman	Student Buyer	Episode: "The Education of Jaime Sommers"
2008	Psych	Neil	Episode: "Murder?... Anyone?... Anyone?... Bueller?"
2011	Shattered	Ramjit	Episode: "Finding the Boy"
2011	Fringe	Paramedic	Episode: "Lysergic Acid Diethylamide"
2013	Emily Owens M.D.	Officer Hewitt	Episode: "Emily and... The Leap"
2013	Cult	Rami	Episode: "Get with the Program"
2014	Arrow	Gholem Qadir	Episode: "Suicide Squad"
2015	UnREAL	Rishi	Episode: "Wife"
2015	Proof	Nate	Episode: "Private Matters"
2015	Once Upon a Time	Sir Kay	Episode: "The Dark Swan"
2015	Supernatural	Hannah / Guardian	2 episodes: "Form and Void", "Inside Man"
2016	The Magicians	The Djinn	Episode: "The Mayakovsky Circumstance"
2017	Rogue	Ozil	Episode: "Elk"
2017	Prison Break	Yasser	Recurring: 3 episodes
2017	Zoo	Tad Larson	Recurring: 5 episodes
2017	Travelers	Dr. Barker	2 episodes: "11:27", "Jacob"
2017	Dirk Gently's Holistic Detective Agency	Silas Dengdamor	Recurring: 6 episodes
2018	The Crossing	Mason Spencer	Episode: "The Androcles Option"
2018, 2019	Superbook	Gamaliel / Anathoth Man	2 episodes: "Disciples on a Mission", "Jeremiah"
2019–2020	You Me Her	Nathan	Recurring: 11 episodes
2019–2020	The 100	Nelson	Recurring: 10 episodes
2020	StarBeam	Mr. Singh	Episode: "Friendsnatcher from Outer Space"
2024	The Dragon Prince	Lyrennus (voice)	Episode: "Unfinished Business"
2025	Upload	Jitendra	Recurring

=== Video games ===
Year	Title	Voice role	Notes
2013	Splinter Cell: Blacklist	Additional voices	
2014	The Fall	Damaged A.R.I.D. / Security Droid	
2017	FIFA 18	Reporter	
2017	Need for Speed: Payback	Jason 'Barracuda' Monroe	
2018	The Fall Part 2: Unbound	One / Bar Friend / Last Time Narrator	
2018	Dragalia Lost	Ieyasu	English dub
2023	Assassin's Creed Mirage	Basim Ibn Ishaq	
2025	Valley of Memory	Basim Ibn Ishaq	DLC for Assassin's Creed Mirage
