= Cloudburst (2011 film) =

Canadian-American comedy-drama film

- Film poster
- Directed by: Thom Fitzgerald
- Screenplay by: Thom Fitzgerald
- Based on: Cloudburst by Thom Fitzgerald
- Produced by: Thom Fitzgerald; Doug Pettigrew
- Starring: Olympia Dukakis; Ryan Doucette; Kristin Booth; Michael McPhee; Brenda Fricker
- Cinematography: Thomas Harting
- Edited by: Angela Baker
- Music by: Jason Michael MacIsaac; Warren Robert
- Production company: Emotion Pictures
- Distributed by: Sidney Kimmel Entertainment
- Release dates: September 16, 2011 (Atlantic Film Festival); December 7, 2012 (Canada)
- Running time: 93 minutes
- Countries: Canada; United States
- Language: English

Cloudburst is a 2011 Canadian-American comedy-drama film written and directed by Thom Fitzgerald and starring Olympia Dukakis and Brenda Fricker. The film is an adaptation of Fitzgerald's 2010 play of the same name. Cloudburst premiered at the Atlantic Film Festival in Halifax, Nova Scotia on September 16, 2011. It opened in a limited release in Canada on December 7, 2012.

== Plot ==
Stella and Dotty are an older lesbian couple from Maine who embark on a Thelma and Louise-style road trip to Nova Scotia to get married after Dotty is moved into a nursing home by her granddaughter. Along the way they pick up Prentice, a hitchhiker travelling home to Nova Scotia to visit his dying mother, and the three bond as they travel together.

== Cast ==
- Olympia Dukakis as Stella
- Brenda Fricker as Dot
- Ryan Doucette as Prentice
- Kristin Booth as Molly
- Michael McPhee as Tommy
- Mary-Colin Chisholm as Ynez
- Marlane O'Brien as Cat

== Production ==
Fitzgerald adapted his own stage play for the screen. The film version was produced by Doug Pettigrew and Fitzgerald, and executive produced by Sidney Kimmel, Vicki McCarty, William Jarblum, Trudy Pettigrew, Dana Warren and Shandi Mitchell. Fitzgerald had originally planned for the role of Dotty to be played by Joan Orenstein, but as she died while he was writing it, he cast Fricker instead. In press for the film, Fricker praised the screenplay, "I was so moved by it. The love story was so beautiful I couldn't say no to it." Three members of the original stage cast reprised their roles: Ryan Doucette, Marlane O'Brien, and Michael McPhee.

== Critical reception ==
The film received an approval rating of 100% on review aggregator Rotten Tomatoes, with an average rating of 6.7/10, based on 9 reviews. The film debuted to an enthusiastic standing ovation on September 16, 2011, at the Atlantic Film Festival, where it won an Atlantic Canada Award for Best Screenplay and the People's Choice Audience Award for Best Film of the Festival. Its second festival appearance was October 20, 2011 at Cinéfest Sudbury International Film Festival, where it also won the Audience Choice Award for Best Film, and on October 23, 2011, the film was the opening night selection of the Edmonton International Film Festival where it won the Audience Award for Best Canadian Film. Cloudburst was very well received at film festivals from coast to coast in Canada, winning awards at festivals in Halifax, Montreal, Kingston, Edmonton, Victoria, and others.

Cloudburst made its U.S. debut at the Palm Springs International Film Festival where it was named a Best of the Fest. The film made its Australian debut at the Breath of Fresh Air Tasmania Film Festival. It made its European debut as Opening Night Gala of the Dublin International Film Festival. It was also selected as Opening Night Gala of the British Film Institute London Lesbian and Gay Film Festival and as the closing-night film of Frameline 36.

Brenda Fricker commented in 2012, "Of all the films I've made, only three do I remember where I felt I'd moved forward as an actress: Cloudburst, My Left Foot and The Field."

== Accolades ==
- Asheville QFest Best Actress Award, Olympia Dukakis
- Asheville QFest Best Supporting Actress Award, Brenda Fricker
- Athens, Greece Outview Film Festival Best Film Award
- Atlanta Film Festival Pink Peach Feature Grand Jury Prize
- Atlanta Out on Film Festival Audience Award for Best Overall Feature
- Atlanta Out on Film Jury Award for Best Film
- Atlanta Out on Film Jury Award for Best Actress, Olympia Dukakis
- Atlantic Film Festival People's Choice Audience Award for Best Film of the Festival
- Atlantic Film Festival Michael Weir Atlantic Canada Award for Best Screenplay, Thom Fitzgerald
- Barcelona International Gay & Lesbian Film Festival Audience Award for Best Film
- Birmingham UK Shout Festival Audience Award for Best Picture
- British Film Institute London Lesbian and Gay Film Festival Opening Night Gala
- Canadian Film Festival Opening Night Gala
- Cinefest Sudbury International Film Festival Audience Choice Award for Best Film of the Festival
- CNKY Cincinnati Kentucky GLBT Festival Award for Best Feature Film
- Copenhagen MIX Copenhagen Film Festival Audience Award for Best Film
- Edmonton International Film Festival Opening Night Gala
- Dublin International Film Festival Opening Night Gala
- Edmonton International Film Festival Audience Award for Best Canadian Indie Film
- Hannover Queer Film Festival Audience Award for Best Film
- Image+Nation Montreal GLBT Film Festival Best Feature Film Award
- Indianapolis LGBT Film Festival Audience Award for Best Lesbian Film
- Kingston Reelout Film Festival Opening Night Gala
- Kingston Reelout Film Festival Audience Award for Best Narrative Feature
- Melbourne Queer Film Festival Opening Night Gala
- Mix Milan Film Festival, Grand Jury Award for Best Feature
- New Zealand Out Takes: A Reel Queer Film Festival, Audience Award for Best Feature
- North Carolina Gay and Lesbian Film Festival Audience Award for Best Feature
- Palm Springs International Film Festival Best of the Fest Selection
- Qfest Philadelphia Audience Award for Best Feature
- QFest St. Louis Audience Award for Best Feature
- Rainbow Reels Waterloo Film Festival People's Choice Award for Best Feature Film
- Sacramento Gay & Lesbian Film Festival Audience Award for Best Film
- FilmOut San Diego, Audience Award for Best Feature Film
- FilmOut San Diego, Jury Award for Best Feature Film
- FilmOut San Diego, Jury Award for Best Leading Actress
- FilmOut San Diego, Jury Award for Best Direction
- San Francisco Frameline Festival Audience Award for Best Film
- Southwest Gay and Lesbian Film Festival Audience Award for Best Feature
- Vancouver International Film Festival Top Ten Most Popular Canadian Film Award
- Victoria Film Festival Best Canadian Film Award

== Adaptation ==
Cloudburst is based on the stage play by Thom Fitzgerald, which debuted on April 8, 2010, at the Plutonium Playhouse in Halifax, Nova Scotia. The play starred Carroll Godsman, Deborah Allen, Ryan Doucette, Marlane O'Brien, Michael McPhee and Amy Reitsma. The successful engagement ran for five weeks and closed on May 8, 2010. The production was nominated for several Merritt Awards, Nova Scotia's professional theatre awards, including nominations for Outstanding Production, Outstanding New Play (Fitzgerald) Outstanding Lead Actress (Allen), Outstanding Supporting Actor (Doucette), and Outstanding Set Design (Fitzgerald). Fitzgerald won the Merritt Award for Outstanding New Play.
