= 43rd Young Artist Awards =

2022 US media awards ceremony

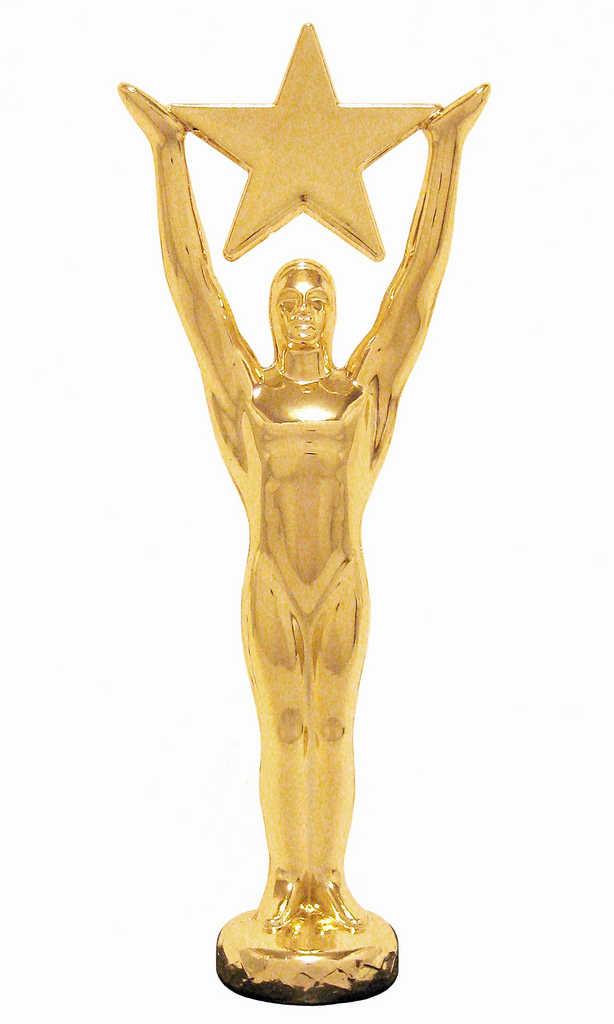
- Awarded for: Achievement during the year 2021 in film, television, streaming, and new media
- Date: October 2, 2022
- Site: Directors Guild of America

The 43rd Young Artist Awards ceremony, presented by the Young Artist Association, honored excellence of young performers between the ages of 5 and 18 in film, television, streaming series, and new media for the 2021 calendar year.

Winners were announced on October 2, 2022, at the annual ceremony held at the Directors Guild of America in Los Angeles, California.

== Winners and nominees ==
=== Best Performance in a Feature Film ===
Best Performance in a Feature Film – Leading Youth Artist	Best Performance in a Feature Film – Supporting Teen Artist
★ Caleb Payne – Good Life: Tristan Riggs – The Seventh Day; Violet McGraw – Separation	★ Catherine Cain – Baking Up Love: Jake Katzman – Materna; Piers Bijvoet – Falling
Best Performance in a Feature Film – Supporting Young Artist	
★ Alexis Arnold – Narco Sub: Devyn McDowell – Annette; Juju Brener – Vanquish; Kailen Jude – Old	

=== Best Performance in a Short Film ===
Best Performance in a Short Film – Teen Actor	Best Performance in a Short Film – Teen Actress
★ Mathieu Silverman – It's Alright, Dad: Loka Pelletier – Angel & Alien; Luke Kim – Soft Sounds of Peeling Fruit	★ Jennifer Michele – Riley: Brooklyn Robinson – Pumpkin Man; Gracie Silva – HONEY: Us; Isabella Fowler – Hahn vs Gilgallon; Kristen Duff – Point Isabelle; Lacey Caroline – Mr. Keeps
Best Performance in a Short Film – Young Actor	Best Performance in a Short Film – Young Actress
★ Dontae Nathan – Drawing Circles: Édouard-B. Larocque – Tenir le phare; Ian Nunney – Cornbread; Mateo Ray – The Daily War; Tristan Riggs – Safe and Sound	★ Lilou Roy-Lanouette – Like The Ones I Used To Know: Ava Torres – The Rickety Man; Eva Petersson – Where is Lucy?; Ines Feghouli – Kamila; Sarah Noelle Eastep – A Day in Plenty Valley

=== Best Performance in a Streaming Film ===
Best Performance in a Streaming Film – Teen Actor	Best Performance in a Streaming Film – Teen Actress
★ Brayden Eaton – Dinosaur Cove: Andrew Fama – Magic in Mount Holly; Owen Vaccaro – Finding 'Ohana	★ Jennifer Michele – Joey and Ella: Allison Mullaney – A Holiday Homecoming; Charlotte Delaney Riggs – Through a Glass, Dimly; Maya Jai Pinson – Crime Scene; Ren Taylor – Deck the Heart
Best Performance in a Streaming Film – Young Actor	Best Performance in a Streaming Film – Young Actress
★ Brandon Faison – A Rich Christmas: Mateo Ray – The Purple Night; Ryker Overacker – Bottle Monster	★ Alexis Arnold – Narco Sub: Brooke Capuano – A Holiday Homecoming; Catherine Cain – A Holiday Homecoming; Neli Kastrinos – The Unforgivable

=== Best Performance in a Streaming Series ===
Best Performance in a Streaming Series – Leading Youth Actor	Best Performance in a Streaming Series – Leading Youth Actress
★ Christian Convery – Sweet Tooth: Oscar Castan – NexGen News; Tristan Riggs – Ashes	★ Charlotte Delaney Riggs – Austin High: Lacey Caroline – NASCAR Kids; Trinity Johnston – Austin High
Best Performance in a Streaming Series – Teen Actor	Best Performance in a Streaming Series – Teen Actress
★ Ricardo Ortiz – The Mysterious Benedict Society: Brogan Hall – Diary of a Future President; Bryson Robinson – Mani; Oscar Castan – ZstarTV; Owen Osborne – VID Chronicles	★ Jessica Mikayla – Diary of a Future President: Dariana Alvarez – Diary of a Future President; Mia Denae' Brathwaite – Petal Grove; Nicole James – Locke & Key
Best Performance in a Streaming Series – Young Actor	Best Performance in a Streaming Series – Young Actress
★ Liam Quiring-Nkindi – Schmigadoon!: Ayush Rajmachikar – Waffles + Mochi; Christopher Convery – On the Verge; Josh Reich – Slasher	★ Rylea Whittet – Maid: Catherine Cain – Welcome to Hope; Phierce Phoenix – ABC Mouse

=== Best Performance in a TV Movie ===
Best Performance in a TV Movie – Young Actor	Best Performance in a TV Movie – Young Actress
★ Azriel Dalman – Coyote Creek Christmas: Josh Reich – A Christmas Letter; Simon Webster – Maps and Mistletoe	★ Skyler Elyse Philpot – Finding Love in Mountain View: Ava Weiss – A Christmas Letter; Cassidy Nugent – Chasing Waterfalls; Maika Quashie – Wendy Williams: The Movie

=== Best Performance in a TV Series ===
Best Performance in a TV Series – Leading Youth Artist	Best Performance in a TV Series – Supporting Young Artist
★ Judah Prehn – Resident Alien: Jordan Poole – Cam Boy; Björgvin Arnarson – Chucky	★ Gracelyn Awad Rinke – Resident Alien: Danny Boyd Jr. – Good Girls; Nicholas Fry – Murdoch Mysteries
Best Performance in a TV Series – Guest Starring Teen Artist	Best Performance in a TV Series – Guest Starring Young Artist
★ Jordan Poole – Chapelwaite: Jordan A. Nash – Breeders; Ricardo Ortiz – Gabby Duran & The Unsittables	★ Sebastian Billingsley-Rodriguez – Nancy Drew: Everly Carganilla – That Girl Lay Lay; Mateo Ray – 9-1-1
Best Performance in a TV Series – Recurring Young Actor	Best Performance in a TV Series – Recurring Young Actress
★ Diesel La Torraca – La Brea: Dontae Nathan – How Do You Feel?; Houston Towe – Animal Kingdom	★ Lilou Roy-Lanouette – L'oeil du cyclone: Ava Weiss – When Hope Calls; Ines Feghouli – Toute la vie

=== Best Performance in a TV Commercial ===
Best Performance in a TV Commercial – Teen Artist	Best Performance in a TV Commercial – Young Artist
★ Charlotte Delaney Riggs – Proactiv: Mia Denae' Brathwaite – GoDaddy; Raffiella Chapman – Unexpected Guest	★ Dontae Nathan – Feed It Forward: Gabriella Sengos – Barbie: A Doll Can Help Change the World; Jeanae Elisha Ventura – Jayman: Get Excited About Nothing Birthday; Kailen Jude – Old Navy; Liam Quiring-Nkindi – CPA Canada: Backbone

=== Best Voice Acting Role ===
Best Voice Acting Role – Youth Actor	Best Voice Acting Role – Youth Actress
★ Wyatt White – Snoopy Presents: For Auld Lang Syne: Mateo Ray – Vida Vert; Judah Mackey – Stillwater	★ Jessica Mikayla – Diary of a Wimpy Kid: Athena Park – Love, Scarborough; Phierce Phoenix – Paw Patrol

=== Best Performance in a Music Video ===
Best Performance in a Music Video – Youth Actor	Best Performance in a Music Video – Youth Actress
★ Tristan Riggs – Complete Me: Brodie Mullin – Tell Me; Dontae Nathan – Itsy Bitsy Spider; Owen Osborne – Nothing's Better; Robert Levey II – Dreams	★ Charlotte Delaney Riggs – Blackillac: Language: Jorie Blake Rosen – Make Your Own Music; Mia Denae' Brathwaite – Bolero

=== Outstanding Awards ===
Outstanding Music Vocalist	Outstanding Music Single
★ Elizabeth Irving – Your Time: Champ Jaxon – Born in the Grove; Robert Levey II – Someone You Loved	★ Oscar Stembridge – These Days: Champ Jaxon – Born in the Grove; Elizabeth Irving – Your Time
Outstanding Instrumentalist	Outstanding Dancer
★ Robert Levey II – Vienna (piano): Champ Jaxon – Born in the Grove (lead guitar); Enzo Castro – La Cumparsita (accordion)	★ Mia Denae' Brathwaite: Andy Dabo; Chace Castle
Outstanding Podcast Host	Outstanding Writer
★ Gabriel Silva – Just Talk With Gabe: Christian Robinson – Defiant Ones; Sadie Sutton – She Persisted	★ Jennifer Michele – Riley: Charlotte Delaney Riggs – Your First Day in Hell; Gracie Silva – The Trouble with the Pink Shoes
Outstanding Producer	Outstanding Director
★ Jennifer Michele – Riley: Charlotte Delaney Riggs – Your First Day in Hell; Tristan Riggs – What If Batman?	★ Jennifer Michele – Riley: Charlotte Quintanar – The Library; Maya Jai Pinson – I Dare You; Sejal Patel – Life with the Patels

== Special awards ==
- Outstanding Music Ensemble Award – The Byrne Brothers
