= Candy Palmater =

Canadian actress and broadcaster (1968–2021)

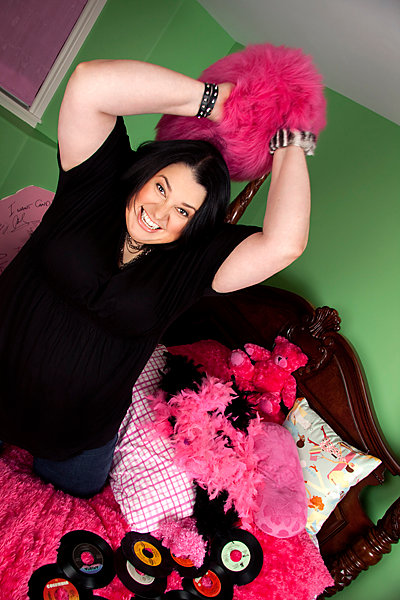
- Born: December 4, 1968; Point La Nim, New Brunswick, Canada
- Died: December 25, 2021 (aged 53); Toronto, Ontario, Canada
- Spouse: Denise Tompkins

Comedy career
- Medium: Stand-up, television
- Website: thecandyshow.com

Candy Palmater (December 4, 1968 – December 25, 2021) was a Canadian actress, comedienne, and broadcaster. She was the creator and writer of her own national television show for APTN, The Candy Show, and hosted the daily interview series The Candy Palmater Show on CBC Radio One in summer 2016.

== Early life ==
Palmater was born December 4, 1968, in Point La Nim, New Brunswick, and grew up the youngest of seven children. She attended Dalhousie Regional High School, where she was active in sports. Her father was Mi'kmaq and her mother was white. She was a member of the Eel River Bar First Nation.

== Education ==
After high school, she attended Fredericton's St. Thomas University and then completed a legal secretary's course at Maritime Business College.

She was inspired by the legal failures of the Donald Marshall Jr. case and in 1996, she went to Dalhousie University in Halifax to study Law at Dalhousie Law School, where she graduated in 1999 as the valedictorian of her class. She was the first Aboriginal law student in Canada to be valedictorian of her graduating class, and was president of the Dalhousie Aboriginal Law Students Association.

She got a job with the now-defunct law firm Patterson Palmer Hunt Murphy, but soon realized she didn't want to practice corporate law, and subsequently left her job and began working for the Nova Scotia Department of Education.

== Career ==
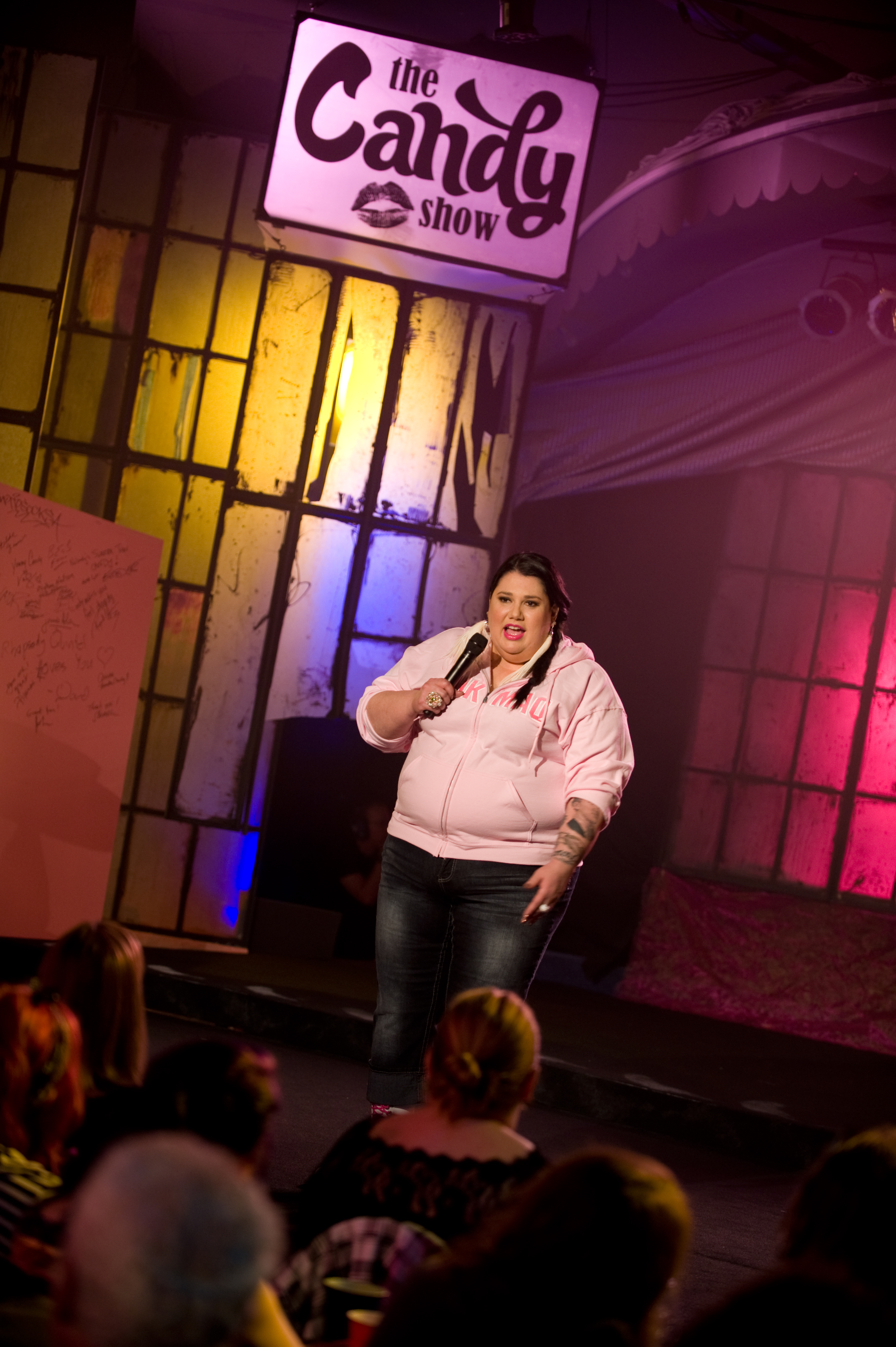
Palmater on the set of The Candy Show

She was a regular contributor to CBC Radio's Definitely Not the Opera, a regular columnist on The Next Chapter, and an interim host of Q, and was a columnist for the now defunct Halifax newspaper The Daily News, where she wrote a series for Mi'kmaq History Month.

CBC Newsworld did a one-hour documentary on Palmater titled The Candy Show. It was produced and directed by Mary Munson in Halifax. The executive producer was Renée Pellerin.

The Candy Show is also the title of a regular comedy series that airs on APTN. Palmater was also a regular performer on the comedy club circuit in Canada, as well as a frequent host of entertainment galas and events.

Palmater produced her first film, Building Legends: The Mi'Kmaq Canoe Project, in 2011.

As an actress, she had roles in the television series Forgive Me, Sex & Violence, and Trailer Park Boys.

Her daily CBC Radio summer series The Candy Palmater Show debuted on May 30, 2016. Following the end of that show's run, she did another stint as guest host of Q for several weeks in September and October, between the departure of Shad and the debut of permanent new host Tom Power. In 2017 she was a panellist on Canada Reads, advocating for Katherena Vermette's novel The Break.

She was also a frequent guest panellist on the CBC Radio One comedy series, Because News, hosted by Gavin Crawford, and narrated the documentary series Skindigenous.

Palmater had a recurring role in the CBC Television sitcom Run the Burbs, broadcast posthumously.

== Death ==
Palmater died at her home in Toronto on December 25, 2021, at the age of 53. Shortly before her death she received several weeks of medical treatment at St. Michael's Hospital in Toronto after being diagnosed with eosinophilic granulomatosis with polyangiitis.

Her memoir, Running Down a Dream, was published posthumously in 2022.

== Filmography ==
Year	Title	Role	Notes
2013	Forgive Me	Agnes	3 episodes
2013	Sex & Violence	Louella	3 episodes
2016	Trailer Park Boys	Candy	9 episodes
2022	Run the Burbs	Candy	3 episodes

== Awards ==
She was nominated for an East Coast Music Award for Media Person of the Year in 2013. The Candy Show was also nominated for a Canadian Screen Award for Best Direction in a Variety or Comedy TV Series, for director Trevor Grant. For her work on the television series Forgive Me, she was nominated for an ACTRA Award for Best Supporting Actress.

In 2017, Palmater was presented with the Bonham Centre Award from The Mark S. Bonham Centre for Sexual Diversity Studies, University of Toronto, for her contributions to the advancement and education of issues around sexual identification.
