= Soul (Canadian TV series) =

Canadian dramatic television miniseries

Soul is a Canadian dramatic television miniseries, which aired on Vision TV in 2009. The series starred Keshia Chanté as a singer in a church choir, who is tempted by the prospect of pursuing commercial pop music stardom as a soul and rhythm and blues singer.

The cast also included Jessica Parker Kennedy, Mpho Koaho, Eli Goree, Kim Roberts, Karen LeBlanc, Benjamin Charles Watson and Clé Bennett.

The series aired six hour-long episodes.

The series received two Gemini Award nominations at the 24th Gemini Awards, for Best Supporting Actor in a Drama (Koaho) and Best Writing in a Drama Series (Floyd Kane).
