= Sofia Banzhaf =

Canadian actress and filmmaker

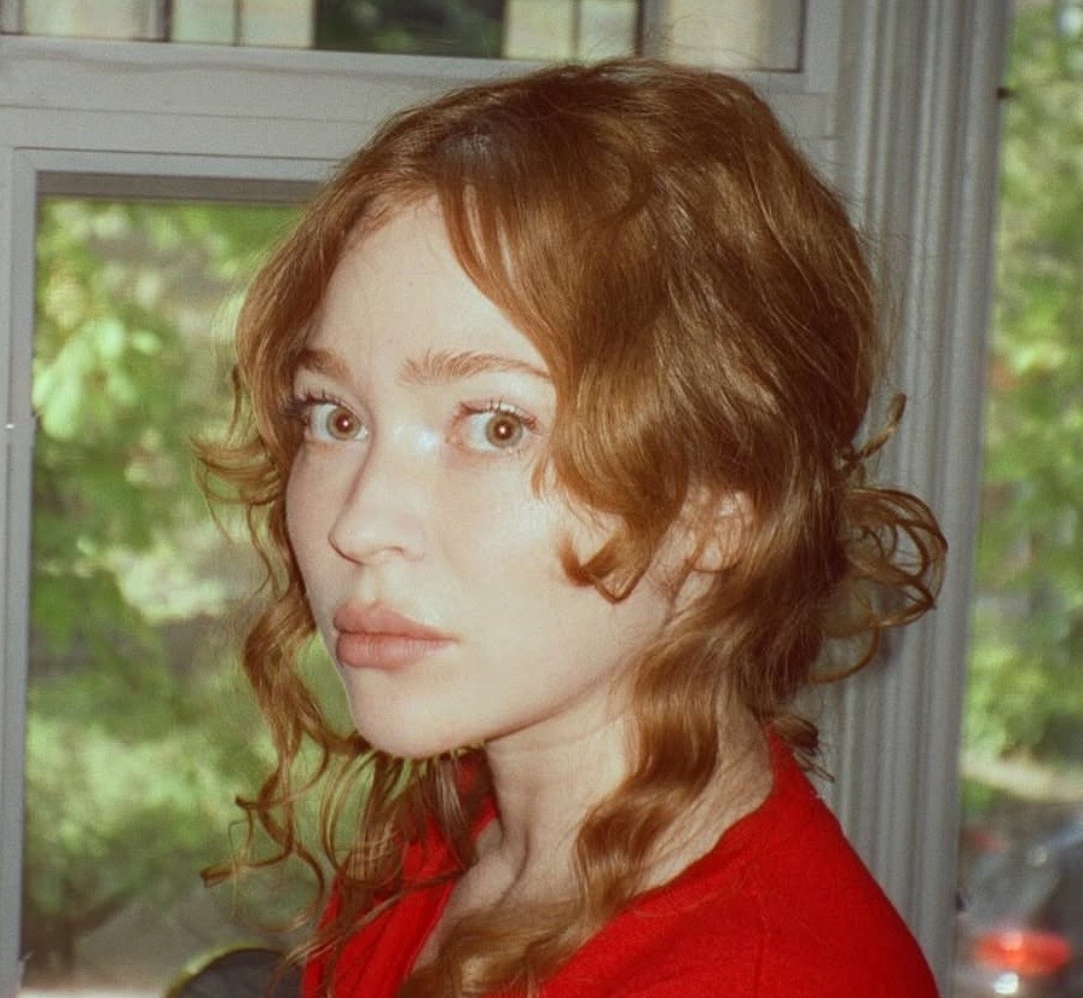
- Occupations: Actress, filmmaker
- Notable work: I Am in the World as Free and Slender as a Deer on a Plain

Sofia Banzhaf is a Canadian actress and filmmaker from Newfoundland and Labrador. Banzhaf was born in Germany and spent part of her early life in the United States. She is most noted for her 2019 short film I Am in the World as Free and Slender as a Deer on a Plain, which premiered at the 2019 Toronto International Film Festival and was named to TIFF's annual year-end Canada's Top Ten list for short films.

As an actress, her roles have included the films Closet Monster (2015), We Forgot to Break Up (2017), Splinters (2018), Black Conflux (2019) and Stage Mother (2020), and the television series Bitten (2014–2016).

Her first feature film as a director, titled Apparatus, was announced in 2026.

== Filmography ==
- 2013 - Silent Retreat: Alexis
- 2015 - Closet Monster: Gemma
- 2016 - Delta Venus: Annabel
- 2017 - Kingdom City Drowning, Ep1. The Champion (Short): Maika
- 2017 - We Forgot to Break Up: Allison
- 2018 - Splinters: Belle
- 2018 - Honey Bee: Cherry
- 2019 - Bing! Bang! Bi! (Short): Sofia
- 2019 - Murdoch Mysteries (TV series): Bella Cooper (episode "The Killing Dose")
- 2020 - Stage Mother: Young Maybelline
- 2021 - The Communist's Daughter (web series): Dunyasha
- 2022 - Retrograde: Gabrielle
- 2023 - Wong & Winchester: Sarah Winchester
- 2023 - Dream Scenario: Leah

== See also ==
- List of female film and television directors
