= Wong & Winchester =

2023 Canadian police procedural television series

- Genre: Police procedural; Comedy drama
- Created by: Hollis Ludlow-Carroll
- Starring: Grace Lynn Kung; Sofia Banzhaf; Joe Cobden; Anthony Lemke
- Composer: Kim Gaboury
- Country of origin: Canada
- Original language: English
- No. of seasons: 1
- No. of episodes: 6

Production
- Production companies: Pixcom; 3 Arts Entertainment; Lionsgate Television

Original release
- Network: Citytv
- Release: January 17 – February 28, 2023

Wong & Winchester is a Canadian television drama series, which premiered on January 17, 2023, on Citytv.

The series was not renewed as viewership was "well under 100,000 in demo."

== Premise ==
The series centers on Marissa Wong (Grace Lynn Kung) and Sarah Winchester (Sofia Banzhaf), an ex-cop and a naive former university student who partner as private investigators in Montreal.

== Cast ==
- Grace Lynn Kung as Marissa Wong
- Sofia Banzhaf as Sarah Winchester
- Joe Cobden as Garry
- Anthony Lemke as Martin Simard

== Episodes ==
No.	Title	Directed by	Written by	Original release date
1	"The Lover"	Stéphan Beaudoin	Hollis Ludlow-Carroll	January 17, 2023
2	"The Painting"	Stéphan Beaudoin	Chris Pozzebon & Elyne Quan	January 24, 2023
3	"The Curse"	Stéphan Beaudoin	Ashley Park & Hollis Ludlow-Carroll	January 31, 2023
4	"The Cheat"	Stéphan Beaudoin	Ashley Park	February 7, 2023
5	"The Retreat"	Stéphan Beaudoin	Chris Pozzebon & Ashley Park	February 21, 2023
6	"The Gun"	Stéphan Beaudoin	Hollis Ludlow-Carroll	February 28, 2023

== Production ==
=== Filming ===
The series is produced by Pixcom, and shot in Montreal, Quebec.
