= Hugh Thompson (Canadian actor) =

Canadian stage and screen actor

- Occupation: Actor

Hugh Thompson is a Canadian stage and screen actor known for Blessed Stranger: After Flight 111, Black Harbour and Forgive Me.

== Career ==
Thompson won the Gemini Award for Blessed Stranger: After Flight 111. He was nominated for an ACTRA Award and a Canadian Screen Award for his work on Forgive Me. For his theatre work, Thompson was honored by the Robert Merritt Awards for his performances in Whale Riding Weather in 2013 for The Beauty Queen of Leenane in 2012, for Kingfisher Days in 2018, and was nominated for his work in Jacob's Wake in 2004 and Some Blow Flutes in 2019.

His other film credits have included Noise, Whole New Thing, Poor Boy's Game, Copperhead, Splinters and Stage Mother.

== Filmography ==
=== Film ===
Year	Title	Role	Notes
1996	Maximum Risk	Bohemia Doorman	
2005	Noise	Man	Short film
2005	Whole New Thing	Claude	
2006	A Stone's Throw	Jean Marc	
2007	Snow Angels	Inspector Burns	
2007	Poor Boy's Game	Chris Webb	
2008	Growing Op	Bowman	
2013	Copperhead	Hurley	
2014	Lure	Warden	
2015	Across the Line	Len Jacobsen	
2017	Touched	Gabriel	
2017	Duet	Gerard	Short film
2018	Splinters	Henry	
2020	Stage Mother	Jeb	
2020	Teething	John Rattle	Short film
2024	Paper	Stick	Short film
2025	Little Lorraine	Gordy	
2025	What We Dreamed of Then	Jon	

=== Television ===
Year	Title	Role	Notes
1989	War of the Worlds	Ray	Episode: "The Raising of Lazarus"
1989	Looking for Miracles	Mo	Television film
1995	The Great Defender	Jimmy McDonald	Episode: "Pilot"
1995	Fight for Justice: The Nancy Conn Story	Sergeant Greenway	Television film
1995	Net Worth	Red Kelly	Television film
1996	A Brother's Promise: The Dan Jansen Story	Richard Beres	Television film
1996	Ed McBain's 87th Precinct: Ice	Det. Cotton Hawes	Television film
1996	Mistrial	Sergeant A. Reeves	Television film
1996, 1999	Psi Factor	Carl Brewster / John Gardner	2 episodes
1997	Due South	Bradley Torrance	Episode: "The Bounty Hunter"
1997–1999	Black Harbour	Buddy Brigley	21 episodes
1998	Recipe for Revenge	Elliot Saunders	Television film
1999	Total Recall 2070	Meadows	Episode: "Bones Beneath My Skin"
1999–2000	Traders	Wayne Kettler	5 episodes
2000	Blessed Stranger: After Flight 111	Everett Barkhouse	Television film
2001	Stolen Miracle	Phil Lewis	Television film
2002	Trudeau	Ron Basford	Television film
2002	The Christmas Shoes	Jack Andrews	Television film
2002	100 Days in the Jungle	Colin Fraser	Television film
2002	Society's Child	Sean Best	Television film
2003	Another Country	Bruce Connelly	Television film
2005	The Eleventh Hour	Sgt. Tom Huber	Episode: "Das Bootcamp"
2005	Our Fathers	Tom Blanchette	Television film
2005	The Christmas Blessing	Jack Andrews	Television film
2005	Tripping the Wire: A Stephen Tree Mystery	Brian Pritzker	Television film
2006	October 1970	Donald McLeery	8 episodes
2006	Canada Russia '72	Gary Bergman	2 episodes
2008	MVP	Joe	3 episodes
2008	The Memory Keeper's Daughter	Al	Television film
2009	Flashpoint	Brian Baumann	Episode: "Business as Usual"
2009	Sea Wolf	Johanssen	Episode #1.2
2010	Haven	Captain Richards	Episode: "Sketchy"
2011	Rookie Blue	Ray Nixon	Episode: "The One That Got Away"
2013–2018	Forgive Me	Smith	11 episodes
2015	The Book of Negroes	Constable Theodore Barnes	Episode #1.5
2019	Murdoch Mysteries	Dan Seavey	Episode: "Pirates of the Great Lakes"
2019	Pure	Sergeant Wolfitt	5 episodes
2019	Reel East Coast	Gerard	Episode #5.4
2019–2020	Diggstown	Gregor Ross	4 episodes
2021	Chapelwaite	Constable Dennison	10 episodes
2022	Reacher	Officer Baker	8 episodes
2024	Law & Order Toronto: Criminal Intent	Coach McAllister	1 episode
2023-2026	Sullivan's Crossing	Tom Canaday	7 episodes
2026	I Will Find You	Lenny Burroughs	5 episodes
