= I Will Find You =

2026 American miniseries

- Release poster
- Also known as: Harlan Coben's I Will Find You
- Genre: Crime drama
- Created by: Robert Hull
- Based on: I Will Find You by Harlan Coben
- Showrunner: Robert Hull
- Starring: Sam Worthington; Britt Lower; Milo Ventimiglia; Erin Richards; Jonathan Tucker; Peter Outerbridge; Madeleine Stowe; Hugh Thompson; Logan Browning; Chi McBride
- Theme music composer: Danny Bensi; Saunder Jurriaans
- Country of origin: United States
- Original language: English
- No. of series: 1
- No. of episodes: 8

Production
- Executive producers: Robert Hull; Harlan Coben; Bryan Wynbrandt; Steven Lilien; John Weber; Brad Anderson
- Production companies: Final Twist Productions; I Have an Idea Productions; Netflix Worldwide Productions

Original release
- Network: Netflix
- Release: June 18, 2026

Related
- Harlan Coben book adaptations

I Will Find You (titled onscreen as Harlan Coben's I Will Find You) is an American crime drama miniseries made for Netflix, adapted from the 2023 novel of the same name by Harlan Coben, who served as executive producer. The miniseries stars Sam Worthington, Britt Lower, Milo Ventimiglia, and Erin Richards. It premiered on June 18, 2026.

== Premise ==
David Burroughs (Sam Worthington) is wrongly imprisoned for the murder of his son, Matthew (Jasper Rainn Lawrence). Five years later, David receives information from his ex-wife's sister, Rachel (Britt Lower), that Matthew (Ashton Cressman) may still be alive.

== Cast ==
=== Main ===
- Sam Worthington as David Burroughs, a former law professor serving a life sentence after being framed for murdering his son
- Britt Lower as Rachel Mills, David's ex-sister-in-law and a former decorated reporter for The Boston Globe now lecturing at Quincy College
- Milo Ventimiglia as Hayden Payne, Gertrude's son and Rachel's ex-boyfriend, who remains her close friend and confidant (Note: Ventimiglia is credited in the first episode of the series, despite his character only appearing from the second episode on.)
- Erin Richards as Cheryl Dreason, David's ex-wife and a talented and compassionate pediatric surgeon
- Jonathan Tucker as Adam Mackenzie, a Boston Police sergeant and David's best friend
- Peter Outerbridge as Philip Mackenzie, the warden of Briggs Penitentiary, Adam's father and a close friend of Lenny
- Madeleine Stowe as Gertrude Payne, a wealthy heiress harboring a dark secret and Hayden's mother
- Hugh Thompson as Lenny Burroughs, a former Boston Police detective, David's father and a close friend of Philip
- Logan Browning as Sarah Greer, Max's daughter and an ambitious special agent in the FBI's Boston Fugitive Task Force branch
- Chi McBride as Max Williams, Sarah's father and a legendary veteran special agent and leader of the FBI's Boston Fugitive Task Force

=== Recurring ===
- Aaron Ashmore as Ronald Dreason, a hospital administrator and Cheryl's new husband
- Kate Vernon as Sophie Burroughs, Lenny's sister and David's aunt
- Greg Bryk as Stephano Stavros, a corrupt Boston Police detective and Gertrude Payne's enforcer
- Tara Rosling as Hilde Winslow/Harriet Winchester, a witness who helped secure David's conviction
- Darrin Baker as Jim Doherty, the managing editor at The Boston Globe and Rachel's friend
- Ashton Cressman as Matthew Burroughs/Theo Payne, David and Cheryl's son, who was supposedly murdered five years ago.
  - Jasper Rainn Lawrence as young Matthew
- Nicola Correia-Damude as Julie D'Souza, a senior special agent in the FBI Boston Field Office
- Vas Saranga as Dev Chopra, a special agent in the FBI Boston Fugitive Task Force
- Gregory Waters as Simmons, a special agent in the FBI Boston Fugitive Task Force
- Billy MacLellan as Kyle "Skunk" Bergin, a lieutenant of Nicky Fisher
- Jefferson Brown as Jacob Heller, a fertility doctor
- Tom Morton as Daniel Müller, a detective with the Swiss Federal Office of Police

=== Guest ===
- Clancy Brown as Nicky Fisher, a semi-retired mobster with connections to the Burroughs family who threatens to expose long-buried secrets
- Christopher Redman as Ted Wesson, a corrections officer at Briggs Penitentiary
- Eric Johnson as Ross Sumner, a serial killer and prisoner at Briggs Penitentiary
- Rachel Wilson as Olivia Wesson, Ted's wife
- Anna Hopkins as Lena Fisher, Nicky's daughter

== Episodes ==
No.	Title	Directed by	Written by	Original release date
1	"Episode 1"	Brad Anderson	Robert Hull	June 18, 2026
Boston law professor David Burroughs is convicted of brutally murdering his three-year-old son, Matthew, with a baseball bat; although the body could not be visually identified, there was a match to Matthew's DNA. In prison, David maintains his innocence. Five years later, he is visited by Rachel Mills, his ex-sister-in-law and a former reporter, who shows him a recent photo taken at an amusement park with what appears to be an older Matthew, identifiable by a distinctive birth mark, in the background. David tells Philip Mackenzie, the prison warden, who is also a family friend, about the photo. Philip discusses this with David's father, Lenny, a retired Boston Police officer, before obtaining a copy of the case file, which he gives to David. After two attempts are made on David's life by a fellow inmate and by a corrupt prison guard, Ted Wesson, Philip conspires with his son Adam, a Boston Police sergeant who is David's best friend, to break David out of the prison. Philip escorts David, wearing Adam's uniform, toward the exit, but the plan falls apart, so David pretends to take Philip hostage. The two escape, but are pursued by the local police.
2	"Episode 2"	Brad Anderson	Robert Hull	June 18, 2026
With Philip's help, David evades the police and is picked up by Rachel. She tells him that Hilde Winslow, a witness who lied to secure his conviction, has changed her name and moved to New York City. Rachel takes David to Ted's house. Ted has already sent his family away in fear for their safety; he gives David the burner phone he used to talk with his handler, Stephano, but then commits suicide. Stephano calls David on Ted's phone to try to deter him from searching for Matthew. Father and daughter FBI agents Max Williams and Sarah Greer are assigned to recapture David. Williams finds the police file in David's cell and sees that Hilde's name has been circled. Greer discovers Ted was being paid by a Cayman Islands shell company. David and Rachel arrive in New York to find Hilde. Rachel's ex-boyfriend Hayden gives her permission to stay in his empty apartment, but he soon learns that David is with her. Stephano, who is revealed to be a dirty cop, searches the house of David's ex-wife, Cheryl. Adam receives a late-night text and proceeds to dig up Matthew's grave.
3	"Episode 3"	Maja Vrvilo	Robert Hull, Steven Lilien and Bryan Wynbrandt	June 18, 2026
Philip and Lenny tell Sophie, Lenny's sister, that it was they who buried the bat to protect David and that Hilde lied in court in testifying that she saw David bury it. Rachel tells Cheryl she is with David and they think Matthew could still be alive. Greer and Williams plan to intercept David when he goes to confront Hilde; Rachel gets herself arrested to distract them, and David enters Hilde's apartment. Hilde tells David that Kyle 'Skunk' Bergin, a lieutenant of Boston mobster Nicky Fisher, threatened her and promised to forgive her daughter's gambling debt in exchange for her false testimony. She helps David escape, but then calls Skunk. Adam tells Philip and Lenny that he dug up the grave to obtain a new DNA sample to prove David's innocence, but the coffin was empty. The three begin re-examining the police evidence in the murder case. Wealthy heiress Gertrude Payne introduces herself to Cheryl; she is revealed to be working with Stephano, who informs her that Rachel has the photo and is in custody. Matthew is shown playing on a beach, and answering to the name "Theo" when called by a woman.
4	"Episode 4"	Maja Vrvilo	Heather Mitchell, Robert Hull, Steven Lilien and Bryan Wynbrandt	June 18, 2026
David tells Hayden that Rachel is in custody and that he asked Hilde to get Skunk to come to New York. Rachel refuses to tell Greer and Williams the significance of the photo; Hayden bails her out. Lenny, Philip and Adam determine that, the night of Matthew's supposed death, Cheryl was called to work by her boss, Ronald Dreason, now her husband, on the basis of a lie. Lenny tells Cheryl about this; Ronald denies it when she asks him, but he later deletes a voicemail from Lenny off her phone. Skunk kills Hilde, but is himself shot in a scuffle with David; he tells David to ask his father why Fisher would want to take Matthew. Philip and Lenny learn that Ronald was a witness in a Medicare fraud case against Fisher but that Fisher intimidated him into ceasing to cooperate with the prosecution. Hayden is revealed to be Gertrude's son, and Stephano has informed her that he is helping David. Greer recognizes Matthew in looking again at Rachel's photo. As Lenny looks through a file on Fisher's son Liam, someone comes up behind him and holds a gun to his head.
5	"Episode 5"	Adam Davidson	Steven Lilien and Bryan Wynbrandt	June 18, 2026
Five years earlier, Swiss orphan Martin Bischof disappears from a Geneva orphanage run by a Boston family after having been left in its care by Fedpol Detective Müller. In the present, Müller is handed an Interpol query from Greer for missing boys resembling Matthew, and Martin fits the description. David's aunt Sophie tells him and Rachel that Lenny is missing. Williams and Greer arrive; when they catch Sophie in a lie, they arrest her for obstruction, but she later tells them Fisher has likely taken Lenny, as he did Matthew. Adam arranges to take David to Fisher, for whom he is revealed to be reluctantly working. Ronald explains he lied to Cheryl the night of the murder because he had a crush on her and wanted to see her. Hayden meets Rachel and offers to obtain pictures from a photographer who would have been at the amusement park the day the photo of Matthew was taken. The FBI fail to stop Adam and David escaping in Fisher's private jet to Key West. In a firefight as the plane leaves, Skunk shoots Williams before Greer kills Skunk.
6	"Episode 6"	Adam Davidson	Robert Hull, Steven Lilien and Bryan Wynbrandt	June 18, 2026
Williams is hospitalized, but survives. Greer receives Martin's file from Müller. David arrives at Fisher's compound, where Lenny is being held. He learns that 10 years ago, Lenny and Philip planted evidence that caused Liam to be sent to prison, where he was killed, and that Adam has been serving as Fisher’s mole in the Boston Police to protect them. Fisher tells David he didn't take Matthew, although he did arrange the false testimony at David's trial. Having received the pictures, Rachel contacts the photographer to be sent some that are missing. Cheryl gives Philip a lock of Matthew's hair to test against the victim's DNA sample in the hope of proving that the original test results were altered. David returns to Boston and tells Rachel that Matthew might not be his son, as Cheryl may have turned to a sperm donor when they were having trouble conceiving. He thinks the donor may have kidnapped Matthew. With Hayden's help, they identify a possible donor as Dr. Jacob Heller, who then worked at the fertility clinic and now works with Cheryl. When the police move in, Hayden lets himself be arrested to buy David and Rachel time.
7	"Episode 7"	Maggie Kiley	Robert Hull, Steven Lilien and Bryan Wynbrandt	June 18, 2026
Five years earlier, Stephano tells Gertude that the false DNA test has been obtained and that David is about to be arrested. In the present, Hayden is released after cutting a deal. Ronald reluctantly helps David and Rachel slip into the hospital to confront Heller, but Cheryl intervenes, telling them that Heller was not her doctor at the clinic and that she was already pregnant at the time of the insemination, meaning Matthew is David's biological son. Müller meets Greer in Boston and tells her that the orphanage Martin disappeared from was funded by the Paynes. Greer has Müller use his financial crimes background to look into the shell company that paid Ted. Müller pays a visit to Gertrude and mentions to her and Hayden the similarity of the company's name to that of her late father; as he leaves, Hayden beats him to death. Cheryl admits she used Rachel's name instead of her own at the clinic. Rachel receives the missing photos, which show Hayden holding Matthew's hand. They realize that it was Hayden who kidnapped Matthew, thinking he was his child. Greer arrives to arrest David.
8	"Episode 8"	Maggie Kiley	Robert Hull	June 18, 2026
Five years earlier, Hayden brings Matthew home with him. In the present, Greer agrees to help David rescue Matthew from Hayden, who is preparing to flee the country. Cheryl shows Williams the results of the DNA test Philip had done, which exonerate David. As a distraction, Rachel goes to see Hayden; he explains that, believing the clinic's client to be Rachel, he paid Heller to impregnate her with his sperm and that, when he saw Matthew at a party years later, he was convinced he was Matthew's father. Rachel forces Gertrude to reveal that she knew from a paternity test Heller ran for her that Matthew was not Hayden's son; Hayden reacts by killing Gertrude. David enters the house and, before Stephano can shoot him, Greer kills Stephano; she and David find Matthew. Hayden shoots David, but is killed by Greer. David survives, and within a few weeks his conviction is overturned. Rachel writes a bestselling book about the case. Greer is promoted to her now retired father's job. Ronald and Cheryl reconcile and she gives birth to their daughter. Eight months later, David attends Lenny's wake, now co-parenting a recovering Matthew with Rachel.

== Production ==
=== Development ===
The series is based on the novel of the same name by Harlan Coben, Robert Hull is co-creating the series with Coben and is showrunner. Coben is an executive producer on the eight-part series via his Final Twist Productions with Hull, Bryan Wynbrandt, Steven Lilien and John Weber. It is the first of Coben's novels adapted by Netflix into an American setting.

=== Casting ===
In March 2025, Sam Worthington was announced as leading the cast of the series alongside Britt Lower, Milo Ventimiglia and Erin Richards. In April 2025, it was announced that Jonathan Tucker joined the cast of the series. Madeleine Stowe joined the cast as Gertrude Payne, whereas Clancy Brown joined the cast as Nicky Fisher. Vas Saranga joined the cast as Agent Dev Chopra. Peter Outerbridge joined the cast as Philip Mackenzie, Hugh Thompson joined the cast as Lenny Burroughs, whereas Logan Browning joined the cast as Sarah Greer. The guest stars on the series include Christopher Redman, Eric Johnson, Greg Bryk, Kate Vernon, Tara Rosling, Darrin Baker, Aaron Ashmore, Nicola Correia-Damude, Rachel Wilson, and Billy MacLellan.

=== Filming ===
Filming took place in Kingston, Ontario and Toronto, Ontario from April until August 2025, with filming locations including the Kingston Penitentiary and the University of Toronto Mississauga. Additional scenes were also shot in and around Washington Square Park, Central Park and Times Square in late August 2025.

== Release ==
The limited series premiered on June 18, 2026.

== Reception ==
=== Critical response ===
The review aggregator website Rotten Tomatoes reported a 64% approval rating based on 38 reviews, with an average of rated reviews of 6/10. The website's critics consensus reads, "An average Harlan Coben adaptation that puts its cast to the test and has just the right formula to pass for breezy entertainment." Metacritic, which uses a weighted average, assigned a score of 56 out of 100 based on 19 critics, indicating "mixed or average".

=== Viewership ===
On July 6, 2026 the show became the number one show in the world, picking up 85 million views within a week.
