= Retrograde (2022 Canadian film) =

2022 Canadian film directed by Adrian Murray

- Directed by: Adrian Murray
- Written by: Adrian Murray
- Produced by: Priscilla Galvez; Adrian Murray; Sennah Yee
- Starring: Molly Reisman; Sofia Banzhaf
- Cinematography: John Palanca
- Edited by: Marcus Sullivan
- Release date: January 27, 2022 (Slamdance)
- Running time: 74 minutes
- Country: Canada
- Language: English

Retrograde is a Canadian drama film, directed by Adrian Murray and released in 2022. The film stars Molly Reisman as a young woman persistently fighting a traffic ticket she incurred while helping her new roommate Gabrielle (Sofia Banzhaf) move in, despite the advice of everybody around her to just pay the fine and move on.

The cast also includes Bessie Cheng, Erik Anderson, Anne Archer, Peter Frangella, Meredith Heinrich, Meelad Moaphi, Joanne Steven and Dean Tardioli.

The film premiered at the 2022 Slamdance Film Festival, where it received an honorable mention from the Breakouts feature award jury. It had its Canadian premiere at the 2023 Canadian Film Festival, where Murray won the award for Best Director.

== Critical response ==
Rachel Ho of Exclaim! wrote that "Retrograde reminds me a lot of one of my favourite novels, Stoner by John Williams. Nothing extraordinary happens in either story and yet, both tickle a part of the brain that feels the need to tear apart and analyze the most banal life events. The biggest difference is that while Stoner feels downtrodden and pessimistic, Retrograde allows for irritated laughter. There's also the distinct possibility that I enjoyed Retrograde because Molly is frighteningly close to who I was during my 20s. Who am I kidding – I'm still that annoying smartass."

For Film Threat, Bradley Gibson wrote that "Murray follows the mumblecore aesthetic but goes even further with it. Molly’s single-minded mania to the exclusion of every other aspect of her life, along with being either unable or unwilling to gauge other people’s emotions, pushes the film into something we should call 'cringecore,' perhaps. It’s painful to watch. One dares to hope this will be a teachable moment for the main character, but this is not meant to be an after-school special (though with a slightly different script, it would make a good one)."
