= Benjamin Charles Watson =

Canadian actor

Benjamin Charles Watson, sometimes credited as Ben Watson, is a Canadian actor. He is most noted for his role as Dontae Evans in the third season of the television series Designated Survivor, and his performance in the web series I Am Syd Stone.

== Early life ==
Born in Jamaica, Watson moved to Toronto, Ontario with his family at age 10.

== Career ==
He acted in supporting film and television roles, most notably in the television drama series Soul, before landing his first major starring role in the television series The L.A. Complex. Watson was a Canadian Screen Award nominee for Best Supporting Performance in a Web Program or Series at the 10th Canadian Screen Awards in 2022 for I Am Syd Stone.

== Personal life ==
He publicly came out as queer in 2019.

== Filmography ==
=== Film ===
Year	Title	Role	Notes
2007	The Limits	Tyrel	
2017	Black Site Delta	Simms	
2017	Playing Cards	Tyrese	
2021	The Family	Caleb	

=== Television ===
Year	Title	Role	Notes
2007	Forensic Factor	John Lee Malvo	Episode: "Washington Sniper"
2009	The Listener	Student #2	Episode: "I'm an Adult Now"
2009	Soul	Dante	4 episodes
2010	Warehouse 13	Rod	Episode: "Buried"
2010	Todd and the Book of Pure Evil	Simon	Episode: "Gay Day"
2011	Jesse Stone: Innocents Lost	Charles Morris	Television film
2012	The L.A. Complex	Tariq Muhammad	9 episodes
2013	The Killing	Rayna	3 episodes
2016	Love in Paradise	Cameraman	Television film
2016	You Me Her	Delivery Guy	Episode: "The Relationship More Populated"
2016	A Firehouse Christmas	Parker Philips	Television film
2017	The Good Doctor	Matthew	Episode: "Mount Rushmore"
2017	Travelers	Lars	Episode: "17 Minutes"
2018	Mingle All the Way	Photographer	Television film
2019	Designated Survivor	Dontae Evans	10 episodes
2020	Snowpiercer	Brakeman Fuller	2 episodes
2020	I Am Syd Stone	Matt	6 episodes
2021	Robin Roberts Presents: Mahalia	John	Television film
2025	Duster	Royce Saxton	Main role
