= Way OUT West Film Fest =

LGBTQ film festival in New Mexico, USA

- Location: Albuquerque and Santa Fe, New Mexico
- Founded: 2003
- Festival date: Late September and early October
- Website: www.wayoutwestfilmfest.com

The Way OUT West Film Fest (WOWFF), formerly the Southwest Gay and Lesbian Film Festival (SWGLFF), is a gay and lesbian film festival founded in 2003. It started in Albuquerque, New Mexico, and has since expanded into Santa Fe. Films and shorts from around the world are showcased in a number of theaters in both Albuquerque and Santa Fe concurrently. Films are often followed by after-parties at the areas top social clubs among other events, including question and answer sessions after the screenings of select films. The festival runs from late September to Early October each year, just prior to the Albuquerque International Balloon Fiesta. The festival is produced by Closet Cinema—a non-profit group based in Albuquerque, whose goal is to highlight the LGBT experience through hosting the SWGLFF among other events.

The festival hosts distinguished films from around the world. The films range in genre from drama and comedy to documentaries, as well as ranging from films produced locally to top-end productions. Some of the films have received a plethora of awards from around the globe. The films are selected through a series of private screenings and open reviews and film festivals across the country.

== The Festival by Years ==
The 2003 debut of the festival hosted seven films and nine shorts. All were shown in the former Madstone Theater in Albuquerque. About 1,500 people attended the first SWGLFF.

The second annual SWGLFF ran from September 9–12, 2004, and hosted just over 30 films and shorts.

The 2005 festival ran from September 16–22. The producers of the festival attempted a new strategy—they set aside one day of the festival to focus on "women in film"—which proved to be a successful tactic. The format would continue to be used in future festivals.

The fourth SWGLFF ran from September 28-October 4. The events of the festival included a panel discussion held after the showing of Meth: Hitting Rock Bottom, and "Mucha Muchachas: A Day of Women in Films" which followed the format created during the previous year, which set aside one day to focus on women in film. In 2006, the SWGLFF also introduced a set of Audience Awards.

The fifth annual SWGLFF in 2007 was a landmark year for the festival which ran from September 28-October 4, hosted over 80 films from 18 countries. The event had over 4,000 guests, pushing it to be one of the "top GLBT film festivals in the Southwest".

In 2008, the festival hosted over 80 different films and ran from September 26-October 2. The films represented dramas and documentaries from over fifteen countries in attempt to create a very cross-cultural experience.

The 10th edition ran from September 29 to October 7, 2012. The Audience Award winners were Thom Fitzgerald's Cloudburst (feature), Mark Freeman's Transgender Tuesdays (documentary), and Mitsuyo Miyazaki's "Tsuyako".

== See also ==
- List of LGBT film festivals
