= Pokémon Apokélypse =

- Directed by: Barry Liu; Kial Natale
- Screenplay by: Kial Natale; Dylan Innes; Lee Majdoub
- Based on: Pokémon by Nintendo, Game Freak, The Pokémon Company
- Produced by: Dylan Innes; Lee Majdoub; Kial Natale
- Cinematography: Kial Natale
- Edited by: Nicholas Porteous
- Music by: David Mesiha
- Release date: September 20, 2010
- Running time: 2:50 minutes
- Country: Canada
- Language: English

Pokémon Apokélypse is a 2010 Canadian fan-made adventure short film directed by Kial Natale and produced by Dylan Innes and Lee Majdoub. Based on the Pokémon franchise, the storyline takes place several years after the events of the original anime series. Intended as a fan-response to "the common trend of 'dark and gritty' reboots of popular franchises", the film was meant to give a mature spin on Pokémon and be in the same vein as work seen on parody website CollegeHumor. The creators initially intended to reveal the film at the Vancouver Anime Evolution convention, it was not shown due to technical difficulties. Instead on September 14, 2010, it revealed online via a teaser segment distributed through emails sent to various media outlets, which presented itself as a recording of a "secret movie trailer screening" for a film in development. The full film followed shortly thereafter, posted online on September 20.

The result of almost two years of work, the film follows Ash Ketchum and his friends years after the events of the original anime series, and their struggle against criminal organization Rocket Industries. Deciding on using the subject of Pokémon after considering several possibilities such as Grand Theft Auto and Dragon Ball Z, the producers were surprised by fan reaction to the material. Despite praises for the content, they have stated they have no intention to produce a full-fledged film.

The initial "leaked" preview was met with skepticism and criticism, with CraveOnline in particular recalling the trend of past video game-inspired films being of poor quality. Kotaku and Topless Robot in particular noting that the preview did it a disservice by hiding the charm of the completed project, which by comparison was met with very positive reception. GamesRadar+ called it "amazing", and stated that the content was "good enough for grown ups"; in a further discussion, they added they were impressed by the quality of the work, and how it addressed the similarity between the games and dog fighting. Other sources such as The Escapist and Game Informer also heavily praised the production, with the former lamenting that such a concept would never officially appear from Nintendo.

== Synopsis ==
Structured as a trailer for a non-existent film, Pokémon Apokélypse is set in the fictional Celadon City, and takes place several years after the events of the original anime series. The plot focuses on Ash Ketchum (Lee Majdoub), a Pokémon Trainer who commands creatures called Pokémon to battle other Trainers' Pokémon to advance within a league setting. Formerly a global sport, it was long since outlawed due to outcries of animal abuse, and instead continued in underground arenas, where the fighting became much more brutal. Despite warnings by his friend Brock (Kial Natale), Ash takes part in the battles with his Pokémon, Pikachu. When approached by Giovanni (David Quast), the head of Rocket Industries, with a bribe to throw his next fight, Ash turns the offer down. In response, Giovanni threatens Ash's former mentor Professor Oak (Richard Toews) and girlfriend, Misty (Rebecca Strom). Deciding to keep them safe, Ash accepts the bribe, and Pikachu is nearly killed in the match.

Quickly regretting his actions, Ash revisits Giovanni and returns the bribe money, declaring himself out of the league. Enraged, Giovanni declares Ash and his friends dead, and sends his minions Jessie, James (Julia Lawton and Gharrett Patrick Paon) and Meowth to carry out the retribution. As a result, Oak is killed, Pikachu and Misty are assaulted, and Brock is tortured. With the help of Pikachu, Brock and Misty, Ash goes after Giovanni and aims to take down Rocket Industries (including Mewtwo), declaring he will not stop until he has "caught them all".

== Cast ==
- Lee Majdoub as Ash Ketchum
- Ikue Ōtani as Pikachu (voice clips)
- Kial Natale as Brock
- Rebecca Strom as Misty
- Julia Lawton as Jessie
- Gharrett Patrick Paon as James
- David Quast as Giovanni
- Richard Toews as Professor Oak
- Sahaj Malhotra as Nurse Joy
- Katherine Atkinson as Officer Jenny
- Jason Lee Fraser as Team Rocket Grunt
- Tanner McCoolman as Team Rocket Grunt
- Taylor Enobuc James as Team Rocket Grunt
- Derek Cheng as Team Rocket Grunt

== Development and production ==
Produced as a side project by Kial Natale, Dylan Innes and Lee Majdoub, the concept originated in December 2008 from the desire to produce a live-action version of a series, with Natale wishing to focus on Grand Theft Auto, and Majdoub suggesting a film based upon Dragon Ball Z. After another member of the group suggested Pokémon as a possibility, they focused on that concept instead. Kial quickly wrote a script for the short film, while Majdoub and executive film producer Innes contributed additional material to flesh it out. Originally intended to be a film in the vein of CollegeHumor's parody productions, more scenes were added and visual effects improved due to Kial's love for the series and his desire for the film to be "more and more". Planning of the film took four months, while filming and production took a year and a half. Varying crew sizes were used for the four different filming periods with the majority of filming occurring within one weekend. Majdoub noted he was surprised at the number of people that came forth for auditions that were not actors, but fans of the series.

The film's tone was inspired by a discussion with editor Nicholas Porteous about a review of Ang Lee's film Hulk, in which a producer theorized that the film was seen as a commercial failure "because it wasn’t dark and gritty, like Batman Begins". Natale found the idea that Begins succeeded solely due to its tone insulting to its director Christopher Nolan, and joked with Majdoub on the popularity of 'dark' series reboots, pondering what series would be good for a live-action adaptation. Settling on Pokémon due to its undertones of animal rights abuse, Majdoub wanted to approach the film from a completely mature standpoint. Displeased with the current trend of video game to film adaptations, they wished to "see how far we could take it without being absolutely ridiculous". A variety of locations were worked in to give the completed project a proper trailer feel. The title Pokémon Apokélypse was chosen as nod to Apocalypse Now, due to the similarity of the shooting ratios, with only ten percent of the footage actually used. Though several scenes were shot to add more content to the film, others using dialogue and one-liners from the anime series were purposefully shot in longer scenes then cropped down, in order to ensure the lines did not feel forced and to give a sense that "here is a world beyond what is shown in the trailer".

Though originally intended to be shown at the Anime Evolution convention in Vancouver, Canada, the crew ran into technical difficulties. At a friend's suggestion, the film was instead revealed through viral emails on September 14, 2010, with the sender named "Professor Oak" attaching a small thirty-second part of the film and presenting it as a small part recorded from a "secret movie trailer screening". Satisfied that the teaser had sparked interest, the full film was released on September 20. Natale stated that he was impressed by the people that had scrutinized the preview to determine whether or not it was genuine. When asked if they had any plans to produce a full movie, Majdoub stated that he would like to consider the prospects if they could receive assistance with the CGI aspects of the film, however any further production would be up to Natale. Natale in turn added that while he was grateful for the positive reviews, he had no intention to do further films based on the Pokémon franchise.

== Critical reception ==
=== Initial reaction ===
Reaction to the film's preview segment was mixed. Kotaku heavily praised the effects, undertone and music, stating that the staff loved it, though lamented that an official film of this kind would join a long line of "ill-advised live-action adaptations". Game Informer called it "absurd", stating that while it was a possible proof of concept film it was more likely completely fake, and adding "It looks goofy as hell, and Pokéfans are sure to get a couple chuckles out of it if nothing else." ComicsAlliance called it "somewhere in the middle" of presenting a better take on the franchise and a reminder that "some intellectual properties got things right (or inherently wrong) the first time", though called the effect "surprisingly competent" and it both generally fun and funny. CraveOnline heavily criticized the film, calling the story formulaic and the production values "threadbare", and further adding that they dreaded the idea of it inspiring an actual live-action film on the series in light of Capcom's Street Fighter: The Legend of Chun-Li.

=== Post-release ===
In contrast, the full film has been well received by the media. GamesRadar+ praised the idea of the film, stating that if produced it would be "the best movie since Piranha 3D" and calling it "good enough for grown-ups". In a further discussion via their Pokémon Monday cast, the three editors involved praised the film as "very well done". While one editor stated disdain for the appearance of the various Pokémon in the film, they agreed that in any live-action adaptation the creatures would "always look weird", and that for a film with a lack of budget they were done very well. They also praised the attention of detail, and praised David Quast's portrayal of Giovanni, as well as the presentation of recurring anime villains Jessie, James, and Meowth. Editor Carolyn Gudmundson added that she was uncomfortable with the grittiness of the production, though praised it for presenting out the inherent problem of the concept behind the games and its similarity to dog fighting.

The Escapist shared similar sentiments, calling the film "amazing" and stating their desire to see the mock-trailer expanded into a full film despite it being contrary to Nintendo's vision of the series; "Why can't anything this cool ever come through official channels?" Joystiq commented that it was "long, long overdue" and called the completed results delightful, questioning why such a project had not been properly attempted years prior. Kotaku added that while the "leaked" segment hid the flaws in the film's effects, it hurt the film by hiding the "hammy charm" of the completed project. Though Game Informer criticized the original segment, they heavily praised the full film, describing it as "what the franchise could look like if Peter Jackson, Martin Scorsese, and Jerry Bruckheimer all teamed up". Topless Robot stated that while the original preview had nearly sabotaged the final production's appeal, they called it "awesome" and described it as taking "Pokémon battles to its inevitable, cock-fighting end". CinemaBlend stated that while the content was out of place with Nintendo's presentation of the series, they found the finished product still "pretty cool", further praising the effects and the approach taken towards the material.
