= I Am in the World as Free and Slender as a Deer on a Plain =

2019 film

- Film poster
- Directed by: Sofia Banzhaf
- Written by: Sofia Banzhaf
- Produced by: Julie Baldassi; Sofia Banzhaf
- Starring: Micaela Robertson; Spencer Macpherson; Daniel Maslany; Andy McQueen
- Cinematography: Bobby Shore
- Edited by: Ajla Odobasic
- Production company: Younger Daughter Films
- Release date: September 7, 2019 (TIFF)
- Running time: 12 minutes
- Country: Canada
- Language: English

I Am in the World as Free and Slender as a Deer on a Plain is a 2019 Canadian short drama film, directed by Sofia Banzhaf. The film stars Micaela Robertson as an unnamed young woman navigating contemporary millennial dating culture through a series of dates and sexual hookups.

The film premiered at the 2019 Toronto International Film Festival. In December 2019, the film was named to TIFF's annual year-end Canada's Top Ten list for short films.
