= Splinters (2018 film) =

- Film poster
- Directed by: Thom Fitzgerald
- Written by: Thom Fitzgerald
- Based on: Splinters by Lee-Anne Poole
- Produced by: Thom Fitzgerald; Doug Pettigrew
- Starring: Sofia Banzhaf; Shelley Thompson; Mary-Colin Chisholm; Callum Dunphy
- Cinematography: Luc Montpellier
- Edited by: Thom Fitzgerald
- Music by: Stewart Legere
- Production company: Emotion Pictures
- Release date: 8 September 2018 (TIFF)
- Running time: 94 minutes
- Country: Canada
- Language: English

Splinters is a 2018 Canadian drama film written and directed by Thom Fitzgerald. An adaptation of the theatrical play by Lee-Anne Poole, the film stars Sofia Banzhaf as Belle, a woman whose relationship with her mother Nancy (Shelley Thompson) has been strained since she came out as lesbian, but who now faces the prospect of coming out all over again as she now identifies as bisexual and is dating Rob (Callum Dunphy).

The film's cast also includes Mary-Colin Chisholm, Deb Allen, Hugh Thompson, Bailey Maughan and Stewart Legere.

The film premiered at the 2018 Toronto International Film Festival.

Reviewing the film for the National Post, Chris Knight noted some thematic similarities with Fitzgerald's debut film The Hanging Garden, and concluded that the film "may try to cram one too many revelations into its brief, 87-minute runtime. And it doesn’t always transcend its stagey origins. But it’s a beautiful homegrown tale, and deserves all the recognition it can muster in these times."

== Awards and honors ==
- ACTRA Award, Outstanding Performance by an Actor in a Leading Female Role, Shelley Thompson
- ACTRA Award, Outstanding Performance by an Actor in a Leading Male Role, Bailey Maughan
- ACTRA Award nomination, Outstanding Performance by an Actor in a Leading Male Role, Callum Dunphy
- Atlantic Film Festival Joan Orenstein Award for Outstanding Performance by an Actress, Shelley Thompson
- Screen Nova Scotia Award, Best Feature Film
