= Gharrett Patrick Paon =

Canadian actor and film producer

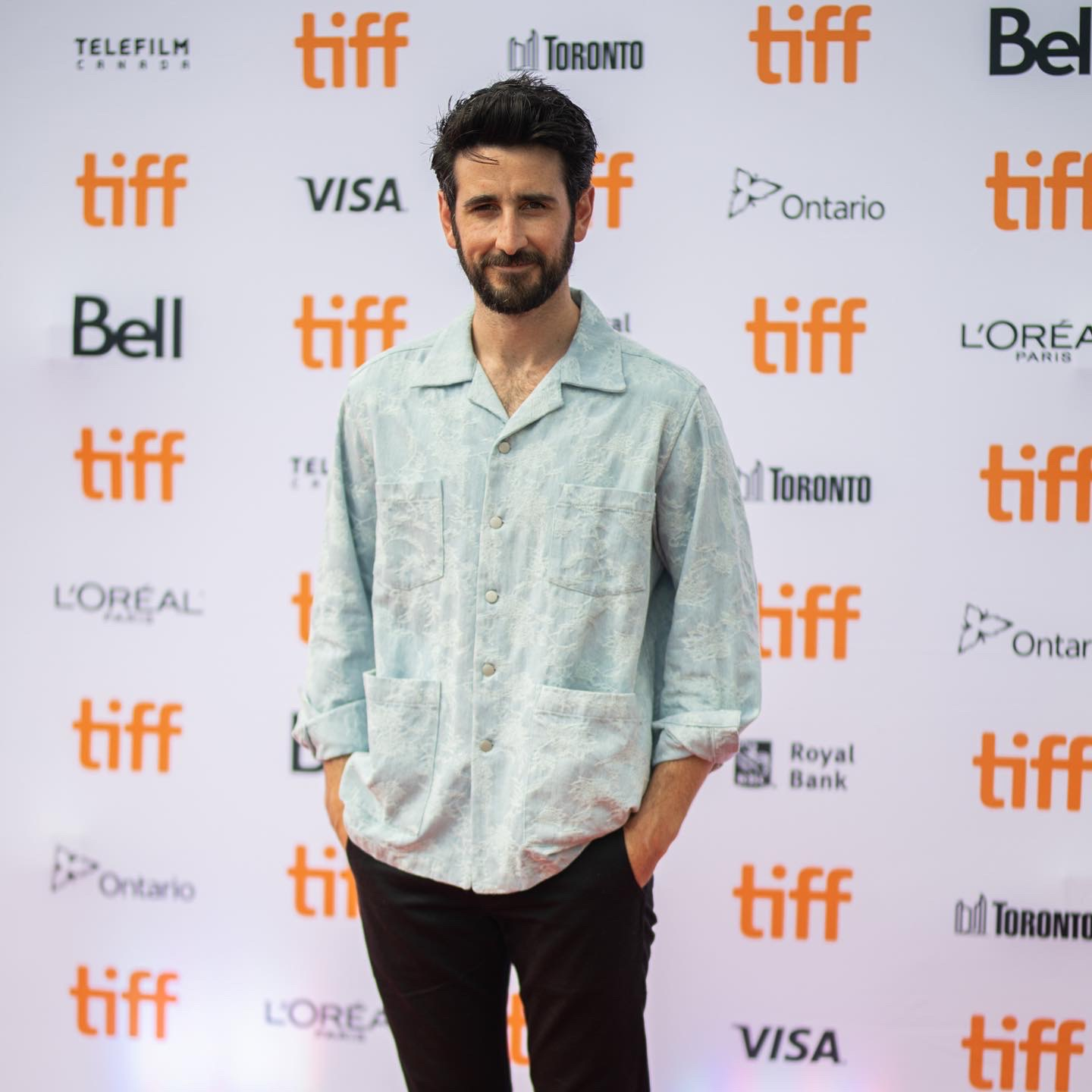
- Occupations: Actor; film producer
- Years active: 2008–present
- Notable work: I Am Syd Stone, Wildhood

Gharrett Patrick Paon is a Canadian actor and film producer. He is most noted as a producer of the 2021 film Wildhood, which was a Canadian Screen Award nominee for Best Picture at the 10th Canadian Screen Awards in 2021.

An alumnus of Dalhousie University and the Canadian Film Centre, he is the president of Rebel Road Films.

As an actor, he first became known for the 2014 short film I Am Syd Stone; however, when the short film was rebooted as a web series in 2019, he remained associated as a producer but agreed to recast the lead role with a different actor. His other acting roles have included supporting appearances in the television series Life Unexpected, The Killing, Haven, The Book of Negroes, Forgive Me, Sex & Violence, Diggstown and The Sinner, and the films The Tenth Circle, Pokémon Apokélypse, Relative Happiness and North Mountain. He is a three-time ACTRA Award nominee from Screen Nova Scotia for his performances in I Am Syd Stone, Forgive Me and Sex & Violence.

He is the son of Alana Paon, a former member of the Nova Scotia House of Assembly.
