= Cam Boy =

Canadian television series

- Season 1 official poster
- Genre: Dramedy; Sex comedy; LGBTQ
- Created by: Thom Fitzgerald
- Written by: Thom Fitzgerald; Kevin Hartford; Callum Dunphy
- Directed by: Thom Fitzgerald
- Starring: Callum Dunphy; Julien Galipeau; Samuel Davison; David Light
- Composer: Warren Robert
- Country of origin: Canada
- Original language: English
- No. of seasons: 2
- No. of episodes: 12

Production
- Executive producers: Brad E. Danks; Katherine Frost; Philip Webb
- Producers: Doug Pettigrew; Thom Fitzgerald
- Cinematography: Charlie Benoit
- Running time: 22 minutes
- Production companies: Emotion Pictures; Isolatary 2 Pictures Inc

Original release
- Network: OUTtv
- Release: April 30, 2021 – present

Cam Boy is a Canadian television drama series, which premiered on OUTtv in 2021. It was created by Thom Fitzgerald, who also serves as a producer and writer. The series stars Callum Dunphy as Aston, a young gay man in Nova Scotia who turns to performing for internet cam sex sites to make money during the COVID-19 pandemic in Canada.

The first season began its original broadcast on April 30, 2021 and ended on June 18 of the same year. The following month, OUTtv renewed the series for a second season which premiered on September 2, 2025.

== Synopsis ==
When Aston (Callum Dunphy) finds himself left to his own devices with bills to pay while his boyfriend is in New York, he turns to camming to make ends meet.

== Cast and characters ==
=== Main ===
- Callum Dunphy as Aston
- Julien Galipeau as Riley/Reilly
- Samuel Davison as Jake
- David Light as Garnet

=== Recurring ===
- Craig Chester as Wegman
- Marcus Hurt as Dustin
- Joey Beni as Billy
- Teo Ferguson as Simon Emmanuel
- Scott Bleu as Scott
- Tony Nappo as Dad
- Zack Currie as Jackson
- Jordan Poole as Noah
- Tyler Riordon as Tyler

=== Guest ===
- Thom Fitzgerald as Roach
- Sharleen Kalayil as Greta
- Loretta Yu as Amber
- Eugene Sampang as Husband
- Joshua Mood as Joshua
- Brenda Fricker as Tilda

== Episodes ==
Season	Episodes	Originally released	
Season	Episodes	First released	Last released
1	6	April 30, 2021	June 18, 2021
2	6	September 2, 2025	October 7, 2025

=== Season 1 (2021) ===
No. overall	No. in season	Title	Directed by	Written by	Original release date
1	1	"Get Naked"	Thom Fitzgerald	Thom Fitzgerald	April 30, 2021
An out of work Broadway chorus boy considers online sex work during the pandemic.
2	2	"Take My Webcam Virginity"	Thom Fitzgerald	Thom Fitzgerald	May 7, 2021
Aspiring cam boy Aston shows his butt online, with unintended consequences.
3	3	"4.5 Out of 5"	Thom Fitzgerald	Thom Fitzgerald	May 14, 2021
Aston performs his first full cam sex show, complete with costumes, props, and his classical theatre training.
4	4	"Booty Shaker"	Thom Fitzgerald	Thom Fitzgerald	June 4, 2021
Aston buys a new toy for the show. His boyfriend tries to justify his cheating when Aston ghosts him.
5	5	"Sloppy Beaver"	Thom Fitzgerald	Thom Fitzgerald	June 11, 2021
Aston's cousin finds out he's camming. During a session he rejects the underage Noah.
6	6	"Daddy Issues"	Thom Fitzgerald	Thom Fitzgerald	June 18, 2021
The cam boy develops an emotional attachment to an older customer.

=== Season 2 (2025) ===
No. overall	No. in season	Title	Directed by	Written by	Original release date
7	1	"As Long as I'm Happy"	Thom Fitzgerald	Thom Fitzgerald	September 2, 2025
Jake is caught masturbating by his parents and Reilly gets a surprise visit.
8	2	"The Cum Show Must Go On"	Thom Fitzgerald	Thom Fitzgerald and Kevin Hartford	September 9, 2025
Aston forgets that his webcam is on and Noah has a bad hangover on his date with Dustin.
9	3	"Take Your Shot"	Thom Fitzgerald	Thom Fitzgerald and Kevin Hartford	September 16, 2025
Aston's cousin Billy is under suspicion at his frat house.
10	4	"Can't Get No Customer Satisfaction"	Thom Fitzgerald	Thom Fitzgerald and Kevin Hartford	September 23, 2025
Dustin can't fulfil his viewers' expectations and Reilly's customer gets interrupted.
11	5	"Snow Angel"	Thom Fitzgerald	Thom Fitzgerald and Kevin Hartford	September 30, 2025
Reilly has an accident trying to please a customer and Aston is harassed online.
12	6	"Just Lonely"	Thom Fitzgerald	Callum Dunphy and Thom Fitzgerald	October 7, 2025
Aston tries to adjust to being single again.

== Production ==
The series was greenlit by OUTtv in 2020, and premiered on April 30, 2021. Callum Dunphy was cast as the lead of the series, the cast also includes Julien Galipeau, Samuel Davison, and David Light. In July 2021, OUTtv announced that it had commissioned a second season.

== Accolades ==
List of awards and nominations received by Cam Boy
Year	Award	Category	Nominee	Result	Ref.
2022	Young Artist Awards	Best Performance in a TV Series – Leading Youth Artist	Jordan Poole	Nominated	
