= Stage Mother (2020 film) =

- Film festival poster
- Directed by: Thom Fitzgerald
- Written by: Brad Hennig
- Produced by: Anne Clements; J. Todd Harris; Brad Hennig; Doug Pettigrew; Laurie Kraus Lacob
- Starring: Jacki Weaver; Lucy Liu; Adrian Grenier
- Cinematography: Thomas M. Harting
- Edited by: Yaniv Dabach
- Music by: Warren Robert
- Production companies: Film Mode Entertainment; Branded Pictures Entertainment
- Distributed by: Momentum Pictures
- Release dates: January 4, 2020 (Palm Springs International Film Festival); August 21, 2020 (United States)
- Running time: 93 minutes
- Country: Canada
- Language: English

Stage Mother is a 2020 Canadian comedy-drama film directed by Thom Fitzgerald, from a screenplay by Brad Hennig. The film stars Jacki Weaver, Lucy Liu, Adrian Grenier, Mya Taylor, Allister MacDonald, Oscar Moreno and Jackie Beat.

Stage Mother had its world premiere at the Palm Springs International Film Festival on January 4, 2020 and was released in the United States on August 21, 2020 by Momentum Pictures.

== Premise ==
The story follows a conservative church choir director who inherits a drag club in San Francisco started by her deceased son, from whom she was estranged after he came out as gay.

== Cast ==
- Jacki Weaver as Maybelline Metcalf
  - Sofia Banzhaf as young Maybelline Metcalf
- Lucy Liu as Sienna
- Adrian Grenier as Nathan
- Mya Taylor as Cherry Poppins
- Allister MacDonald as Joan of Arkansas
- Oscar Moreno as Tequila Mockingbird
- Jackie Beat as Dusty Muffin
- Lenore Zann as Bevette
- Anthony Skordi as August
- Hugh Thompson as Jeb Metcalf
- Eldon Thiele as Ricky Metcalf
- Callum Dunphy as Chappy

== Production ==
In May 2018, it was announced that Jacki Weaver, Lucy Liu, and Taye Diggs had signed on to appear in the film, with filming set to take place in Nova Scotia, Canada. However, Diggs had to drop out of the production due to scheduling conflicts. Filming took place in late 2018.

== Release ==
The film had its world premiere at the Palm Springs International Film Festival on January 4, 2020. Shortly after, Momentum Pictures acquired distribution rights to the film, and set it for an August 21, 2020, release.

== Reception ==
On the review aggregator website Rotten Tomatoes, 62% of 34 critics' reviews are positive. The website's consensus reads: "Stage Mother teeters awkwardly on stereotypes, but Jacki Weaver's performance makes this culture clash dramedy difficult to dismiss." Metacritic, which uses a weighted average, assigned the film a score of 41 out of 100, based on 8 critics, indicating "mixed or average" reviews.
