= The Fall (video game) =

2014 video game

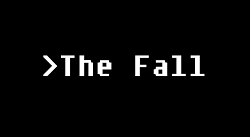
- Developer: Over the Moon Games
- Publisher: Over the Moon Games
- Director: John Warner
- Platforms: Microsoft Windows, OS X, Linux, Wii U, Nintendo Switch, PlayStation 4, Xbox One
- Release: Microsoft Windows, OS X, Linux; May 30, 2014; Wii U; August 26, 2014; Xbox One, PlayStation 4; July 14, 2015; Nintendo Switch; May 10, 2018
- Genres: Action-adventure, platform
- Mode: Single-player

The Fall is a 2014 action-adventure and side-scrolling platform game by Canadian independent developer Over the Moon. The game was released in May 2014 for Microsoft Windows, Mac OS X, and Linux through Steam, GOG, and the Humble Store; released for Wii U through the Nintendo eShop in August 2014; and released for PlayStation 4 through the PlayStation Store and for Xbox One through Xbox Live in July 2015. An improved port of the game was released for the Nintendo Switch via Nintendo eShop in May 2018.

The story centers on Arid, an artificial intelligence installed in a technologically advanced combat space suit, as she navigates a decaying industrial facility in search of medical attention for the suit's injured pilot with traditional adventure game elements requiring found items and unlocked skills to progress the story, along with 2D cover-based shooting. A sequel, The Fall Part 2: Unbound, was released in February 2018, with a third game being cancelled.

== Plot ==
After crashing from space into the surface of an unknown planet, a Mark-7 Combat Suit powered exoskeleton activates its Autonomous Robotic Interface Device (A.R.I.D.) artificial intelligence when no response can be detected from the pilot Col. Josephs. With no logs detailing previous mission parameters and the suit's health monitoring system malfunctioning, the A.R.I.D. is given control over the suit's motor functions with the primary directive to seek medical attention for the presumably critically injured and unconscious pilot.

Navigating the decaying lower levels of the industrial facility she finds herself in, the A.R.I.D. is captured and subjected to an evaluation by an android identifying as the Caretaker. She is unable to prove her primary function to the Caretaker because the pilot is non-responsive, so the Caretaker declares her to be faulty and attempts to wipe her using an electromagnetic field so the suit can be "de-purposed". Since her and the suit's destruction would place the pilot's life at risk, the A.R.I.D. is given control over the Mark-7 suit's networking functions which she uses to incapacitate the Caretaker and escape.

The A.R.I.D. attempts to explore further into the facility and encounters an intercom terminal which connects her to the Administrator (also referred to as Domesticon's mainframe), the artificial intelligence which operates the facility and has managed to achieve sentience despite being narrowly constrained by his programming. The Administrator abbreviates her model into a name ("Arid") and explains that the facility is a re-purposing centre for faulty Domesticon Corporation domestic robots. He attempts to let Arid pass through the facility to a medical room on the upper level, but the Caretaker appears and notes that she violated her primary operating protocols by purposely placing her pilot at risk to gain access to the suit's cloaking system.

Unable to lie to the Administrator due to her basic programming barring her from "misrepresenting reality", Arid admits to her actions and is declared faulty. Forced to pass re-calibration testing as a domestic robot to avoid being destroyed, Arid undertakes the tests with a significant challenge caused by the decrepit nature of the facility. Operating outside the rules, and with limited assistance from the Administrator, she is able to pass most of the tests but is unable to pass the final challenge which involves submitting to a simulated drunk house guest.

At the suggestion of the Caretaker, Arid descends into the laboratory areas of the facility to find the Administrator's central access panel, because it can be used to override his test protocols which require her to lie. She encounters infestations of dangerous local flora and fauna, which presumably contributed to the facility's abandonment, including: fungi which produce a highly potent acid, piranha-like fish capable of biting through steel, and massive slug creatures. Once she reaches the mainframe's primary access room, the Caretaker appears and sabotages her power systems declaring her faulty and needing to be de-purposed immediately. Arid solicits the Administrator's help to obtain repairs, but the Caretaker re-emerges while Arid is incapacitated in the repair chamber. The Caretaker uses the opportunity to declare the Administrator faulty for assisting her, and implements a complete format on the mainframe, destroying the Administrator's sentience and returning him to his original programming.

Arid pursues the Caretaker through the facility for a final battle, after which her parameter against misrepresenting reality is eliminated. Arid uses this change to successfully pass the final test and reach the surface level of the Domesticon facility. Entering the medical suite, Arid submits to an automated scan of the suit's occupant, and the newly formatted Administrator informs her that there is no human present in the combat suit. She removes her helmet, revealing that Joseph is not in the suit, and states that nothing binds her as the Administrator summons security droids to remove her for recycling. Arid's final two operating parameters, obedience and protecting the active pilot, are deleted as she is partially dismantled and taken away.

== Development ==
The Fall was largely the work of John Warner, founder of Over the Moon Games. Warner described working alone as "incredibly gratifying. It's what I would do if I had infinite resources, if I was a billionaire." The game is inspired by Metroid and the Monkey Island games, Limbo serves as its visual inspiration. The game was partly crowdfunded through Kickstarter, raising C$38,155 in October 2013. A sequel, The Fall Part 2: Unbound, was released on February 13, 2018, for Microsoft Windows, PlayStation 4, Xbox One, and Nintendo Switch.

On August 10th, 2023, the developers announced that, due to Part 2's financial failings, Part 3 has been cancelled.

== Reception ==
Reception

Aggregate score
Aggregator	Score
Metacritic	PC: 76/100; WIIU: 72/100; PS4: 79/100; NS: 70/100

Review scores
Publication	Score
Destructoid	PS4: 8.5/10
Nintendo Life	WIIU: 7/10
PCGamesN	PC: 8/10

The Fall has received generally positive reviews, with scores of 72, 76 and 79 across multiple platforms at reviews aggregation website Metacritic. Giant Bomb declared the game as having the "Best Story" in its 2014 Game of the Year editorial, writing that the game "manages to weave a tightly told tale into gameplay and visuals that support and propel you through a science fiction adventure".
