= The Wild Dogs =

- Directed by: Thom Fitzgerald
- Written by: Thom Fitzgerald
- Produced by: Ann Bernier
- Starring: Alberta Watson; Rachel Blanchard; Visinel Burcea
- Cinematography: Tom Harting
- Edited by: Michael Weir
- Music by: Sandy Moore
- Production company: Chum Television
- Distributed by: Mongrel Media
- Release date: September 10, 2002 (TIFF)
- Running time: 97 minutes
- Country: Canada
- Language: English

The Wild Dogs is a Canadian drama film, directed by Thom Fitzgerald and released in 2002. Set in Romania, the film is an examination of the moral and ethical compromises that people can be forced into when living in poverty.

The film debuted at the 2002 Toronto International Film Festival.

== Plot ==
Fitzgerald acts in the film as Geordie, a pornographer sent to Romania by his boss Colin (Geraint Wyn Davies) to scout for young girls for the company. On the flight he meets Victor (David Hayman), a Canadian diplomat based in Romania who has just been diagnosed with cancer and needs Geordie's help when they arrive in Bucharest, where he in turn meets Victor's wife Natalie (Alberta Watson) and daughter Moll (Rachel Blanchard). As he is actually exposed to conditions in the city, however, Geordie's perspective on his job changes; instead of photographing young women for sexual exploitation, he starts photographing people and conditions around the city in a documentary-like manner.

== Cast ==
- Rachel Blanchard as Moll
- Visinel Burcea as Sour Grapes
- Mihai Calota as Bogdan
- Geraint Wyn Davies as Colin
- Nelu Dinu as Dorutu (as Dinu Viorel Nelu)
- Thom Fitzgerald as Geordie
- David Hayman as Victor
- Simona Popescu as Varvara
- Marcel Unguriano as Radu
- Alberta Watson as Natalie

== Awards ==
The film won four awards at the 2002 Atlantic Film Festival, for Best Canadian Film, Best Director (Fitzgerald), Best Sound Design (Hayward Parrott) and Best Editing (Michael Weir). It received three Genie Award nominations at the 24th Genie Awards in 2004, for Best Supporting Actor (Hayman), Best Editing (Weir) and Best Original Score (Sandy Moore).

Fitzgerald picked up an "Emerging Master" trophy from the Seattle International Film Festival.
