= Sex & Violence (TV series) =

- Genre: Drama
- Created by: Thom Fitzgerald
- Starring: Jennie Raymond; Jackie Torrens; Olympia Dukakis; Preston Carmichael; Kerry Fox; Riley Raymer
- Opening theme: Time After Time (shortened version) by Cyndi Lauper
- Ending theme: Time After Time (shortened version) by Cyndi Lauper
- Country of origin: Canada
- Original language: English
- No. of series: 3
- No. of episodes: 15

Production
- Executive producers: Olympia Dukakis; Brad Danks Rob Joseph Leonard Vicki McCarty
- Producer: Doug Pettigrew
- Production locations: Nova Scotia, Canada
- Cinematography: Jason Levangie
- Production company: eMotion Pictures

Original release
- Network: OUTtv
- Release: November 17, 2013 – September 24, 2017

Sex & Violence is a television series that first aired on 17 November 2013 on OUTtv in Canada. The series stars Jennie Raymond as a lesbian police constable, Olympia Dukakis as a victim advocate, Jackie Torrens as a social worker and Kerry Fox and Preston Carmichael as therapists. The original six-part show, focused on domestic violence, became the highest rated original drama in OUTtv's history and the channel announced its renewal on 8 May 2014. The third season debuted on OUTtv on 10 September 2017.

== Cast ==
- Jennie Raymond as Constable Maria Roach
- Jackie Torrens as Drucie MacKay
- Olympia Dukakis as Alex Mandalakis
- Kerry Fox as Brenda Shaw
- Preston Carmichael as Manny MacNeil
- Michael McPhee as Constable Doug Downey
- Callum Dunphy as Finn
- Riley Raymer as Megan
- Rob Joseph Leonard as Jasper Whynacht
- Jeremy Akerman as Judge Seamus MacDonald
- Pasha Ebrahimi as Dr. Padraig O'Carroll
- Kevin Kincaid as Diarmuid
- Candy Palmater as Louella
- Glen Matthews as Stephen
- Thom Payne as Steven
- Naomi-Joy Blackhall-Butler as Marjorie Mbelu
- Adrian Comeau as Rejean
- Andria Wilson as Ginger Kim
- Koumbie as Aria
- Andrea Lee Norwood as Mona
- Gharrett Patrick Paon as Crawford
- Krista MacDonald as Krista Cirby

== Production ==
The series is filmed in Nova Scotia, Canada. Thom Fitzgerald wrote and directed the original series, which also features Jeremy Akerman, Naomi-Joy Blackhall-Butler, Pasha Ebrahimi, Michael McPhee, Glen Matthews, Lisa-Rose Snow, Candy Palmater and Rob Joseph Leonard. Season 2 introduces new characters played by Preston Carmichael, Kevin Kincaid and Riley Raymer.

== Awards and nominations ==
- 2018 ACTRA Award for Best Lead Actress, Jennie Raymond
- 2018 ACTRA Award Nomination for Best Lead Actress, Jackie Torrens
- 2018 ACTRA Award Nomination for Best Lead Actor, Alex Purdy
- 2018 ACTRA Award Nomination for Best Supporting Actress, Koumbie
- 2018 ACTRA Award Nomination for Best Supporting Actor, Pasha Ebrahimi
- 2018 ACTRA Award Nomination for Best Supporting Actor, Gharrett Patrick Paon
- 2018 Screen Nova Scotia Award Nomination for Best TV Series
- 2018 Canadian Screen Award nomination for Best Performance by an Actress in a Continuing Leading Dramatic Role, Jennie Raymond
- 2016 ACTRA Award Nomination for Best Lead Actress, Jackie Torrens
- 2016 ACTRA Award for Best Lead Actress, Jennie Raymond
- 2016 ACTRA Award Nomination for Best Supporting Actress, Andria Wilson
- 2016 ACTRA Award Nomination for Best Supporting Actress, Krista MacDonald
- 2016 ACTRA Award Nomination for Best Supporting Actor, Glen Matthews
- 2016 Screen Nova Scotia Award Nomination for Best TV Series
- 2016 Canadian Screen Award nomination for Best Performance by an Actress in a Continuing Leading Dramatic Role, Jennie Raymond for the episode "Famous Last Words"
- 2016 Canadian Screen Award nomination for Best Performance by an Actor in a Featured Supporting Role in a Dramatic Program or Series, Callum Dunphy, for the episodes "Connection" and "Shelter"
- 2015 ACTRA Award Nomination for Best Lead Actress, Jackie Torrens
- 2015 ACTRA Award Nomination for Best Lead Actress, Jennie Raymond
- 2015 ACTRA Award for Best Supporting Actress, Carol Sinclair
- 2015 ACTRA Award Nomination for Best Supporting Actor, Michael McPhee
- 2015 ACTRA Award Nomination for Best Supporting Actor, Pasha Ebrahimi
- 2015 Canadian Screen Award (Gemini Award) nomination for Best Direction in a Dramatic Series, Thom Fitzgerald for the episode "Surface Scars"
- 2015 Canadian Screen Award (Gemini Award) nomination for Best Performance by an Actress in a Continuing Leading Dramatic Role, Jennie Raymond for the episode "Denial"
- 2015 Canadian Screen Award (Gemini Award) nomination for Best Performance by an Actress in a Continuing Leading Dramatic Role, Jackie Torrens, for the episode "Social Work"
- 2015 Canadian Screen Award (Gemini Award) nomination for Best Performance by an Actress in a Featured Supporting Role in a Dramatic Program or Series, Olympia Dukakis, for the episode "Social Work"
- 2015 Canadian Screen Award (Gemini Award) nomination for Best Performance in a Guest Role, Dramatic Series, Carol Sinclair, for the episode "Social Work"

== Episodes ==
=== Season 1 (2013) ===
No.	Title	Directed by	Written by	Original release date
1	"Social Work"	Thom Fitzgerald	Thom Fitzgerald	17 November 2013
Victim Advocate Alex Mandalakis tries to keep an axe attack victim safe in a women's shelter. Social worker Shrek finds a foster home for two troubled children with gay couple Stephen and Steven. Stars Carol Sinclair.
2	"Denial"	Thom Fitzgerald	Thom Fitzgerald	24 November 2013
Constable Roach is assaulted outside a bar but struggles to have her case heard in court.
3	"Surface Scars"	Thom Fitzgerald	Thom Fitzgerald	1 December 2013
Alex helps a teenager who was held captive put his life back together. Stars Aaron Webber.
4	"Loosen the Noose"	Thom Fitzgerald	Thom Fitzgerald	8 December 2013
Jasper seeks sex in the wake of his failed marriage. Alex tries to recruit a victim's son to testify against his father.
5	"One Side"	Thom Fitzgerald	Thom Fitzgerald	15 December 2013
Inappropriate behavior puts Alex's career at risk. Brenda has a secret affair.
6	"The Break Up"	Thom Fitzgerald	Thom Fitzgerald	22 December 2013
An estranged husband takes over the women's shelter and Alex is in danger. Constable Roach isolates a killer.

=== Season 2 (2015) ===
No.	Title	Directed by	Written by	Original release date
7	"Atlantic Rim"	Thom Fitzgerald	Thom Fitzgerald	20 July 2015
Roach sees a connection between two mysterious deaths. Stephen rebuilds his life as a widower and Alex refuses help after being shot.
8	"Famous Last Words"	Thom Fitzgerald	Thom Fitzgerald	27 July 2015
Roach and Downey respond to a shooter at a school. Chanel urges Alex to leave Seamus.
9	"Back When I Was A Kid"	Thom Fitzgerald	Thom Fitzgerald	3 August 2015
Megan, Roach, Shrek and Alex try to help a mother and her three sons to leave her unstable husband.
10	"Three Shots"	Thom Fitzgerald	Thom Fitzgerald	10 August 2015
Manny confesses an affair and Alex opens her home to an ungrateful abused woman.
11	"Connection"	Thom Fitzgerald	Thom Fitzgerald	17 August 2015
Alex asks Seamus to help her start a women's shelter. Roach pursues her theory that a serial killer is targeting gay men.
12	"Shelter"	Thom Fitzgerald	Thom Fitzgerald	24 August 2015
Alex tries desperately to raise funds for her women's shelter. An old mistake comes back to haunt Roach and the killer is revealed.

=== Season 3 (2017) ===
No.	Title	Directed by	Written by	Original release date
13	"Aftermath"	Thom Fitzgerald	Thom Fitzgerald	10 September 2017
Shrek is called to the scene of a school shooting. Roach asks Shrek to help call attention to a crime.
14	"Survivor's Guilt"	Thom Fitzgerald	Thom Fitzgerald	17 September 2017
Roach searches for the strangler. Shrek forms a bond with an injured teacher.
15	"Finn"	Thom Fitzgerald	Thom Fitzgerald	24 September 2017
Shrek and Roach try to intervene when they suspect a teen is being stalked.
