= Forgive Me (TV series) =

- Genre: Drama
- Starring: Mike McLeod; John Dunsworth; Jane Alexander; Hugh Thompson; Olympia Dukakis; Brenda Fricker; Wendy Crewson; Bruce Davison; Karen Robinson; Jennifer Podemski; Rebecca Jenkins; Candy Palmater; Jeremy Akerman; Rob Joseph Leonard; Gharrett Patrick Paon; Ryan Doucette; Craig Layton; Lauren Liem; Daniel Fanaberia; Mary-Colin Chisholm; Juanita Peters; Susan Leblanc; Shawn Duggan
- Theme music composer: Christopher Francis Mitchell
- Composer: Warren Robert
- Country of origin: Canada
- Original language: English
- No. of seasons: 3
- No. of episodes: 32

Production
- Producers: Doug Pettigrew, Thom Fitzgerald
- Production location: Halifax, Nova Scotia
- Running time: 24 minutes
- Production company: Emotion Pictures Inc.

Original release
- Network: Super Channel
- Release: September 4, 2013

Forgive Me is a Canadian television drama series, about a young insomniac priest who gets caught up in the sins of his congregants while a secret from his own past threatens his calling.

The series is written and directed by Thom Fitzgerald. It stars Mike McLeod, John Dunsworth, Jane Alexander, Hugh Thompson, Olympia Dukakis, Brenda Fricker, Wendy Crewson, Bruce Davison, Jeremy Akerman, Ryan Doucette, Candy Palmater, Ed Asner, Gharrett Patrick Paon and Rob Joseph Leonard.

The series began its original broadcast on September 4, 2013 on Super Channel in Canada. It aired its second season in 2015, and its third in 2018.

== Plot ==
The Priest (Mike McLeod), whose actual name is never given throughout the series, is the junior priest at a Roman Catholic church in Nova Scotia. With young men now rarely joining the Catholic priesthood, he is serving under a Prelate (John Dunsworth) and older priests Gene (Jeremy Akerman) and Phil (Rob Joseph Leonard), who are all near retirement; he is planned to eventually take over as the parish's main pastor, but currently performs lesser duties such as hearing confessions. The Priest comes from a dysfunctional family background; he was raised primarily by his grandmother Novalea (Olympia Dukakis) after his mother abandoned the family, while his brother was born with fetal alcohol syndrome and has frequently bounced in and out of jail for various crimes.

In the first episode, The Priest learns that Victoria (Naomi Blackhall-Butler), his girlfriend before he entered the seminary, lied to him when she got pregnant with his baby; she claimed at the time that she had an abortion, but did not. In fact, he has a teenage daughter named Noelle (Lauren Liem), and thus faces the dilemma of how to take parental responsibility for her on a priest's salary while simultaneously preventing the parish and the bishop (Ed Asner) from finding out about it. At the same time, he is having trouble sleeping at night and is regularly haunted by visions of Saint Sebastian (Ryan Doucette), which is beginning to impact his physical health.

The centrepiece of each episode is an extended dialogue in the confessional booth between The Priest and a parishioner; outside of this, however, plot development takes place through multi-episode story arcs rather than each episode comprising a self-contained story, and the show carries the stories of a few confessioners through multiple episodes rather than featuring new confessioners every week. The confessions serve to explore both themes of moral complexity within Roman Catholic doctrine, and the ethical dilemmas facing The Priest as he tries to get involved in helping the parishioners with their issues outside the confession booth.

The show's main narrative throughline begins with the confession of Johnny "Smith" O'Leary (Hugh Thompson), who initially confesses to having had inappropriate sexual thoughts about an underage girl, but soon reveals that he was himself sexually abused as a child by a former choirmaster at this very church and that Father Gene was involved in covering it up, setting up The Priest's biggest ethical conflict as he cannot help O'Leary to pursue justice and healing without breaking the Seal of the Confessional or undermining his own employer. Secondary storylines include the journey of Bookie (Jane Alexander), a woman who left the church decades earlier after being told that she could not have an abortion even to end a non-viable pregnancy that would have killed her, toward reconciliation with the church after she is diagnosed with terminal cancer; the desire of Agnes (Candy Palmater) to become a single mother through in vitro fertilization; Sebastian's emergence as a real person who challenges The Priest over the church's position on homosexuality; and the struggles of Celeste (Wendy Crewson), a former federal Member of Parliament who lost her job as a media pundit after her role in a political scandal was revealed.

== Critical response ==
The series was generally well-received, attaining positive reviews. John Doyle of The Globe and Mail compared it to In Treatment, praised Mike McLeod's performance as "superb", noted "a visual sumptuousness that's startling" and called it "a powerful 30 minutes of television." Brad Oswald of the Winnipeg Free Press wrote "The confessional-confined dialogue is smart, and the stripped-down performances are seamlessly delivered and punctuated with moments of pure, stark, painful honesty."

== Web series ==
In 2016, the companion web series Forgive Me Web Confessions was launched, again starring McLeod as The Priest, with Keelin Jack, Krista MacDonald and Callum Dunphy as penitents. The web series was also well received, with nominations for most of the cast from the ACTRA Awards.

== Awards and nominations ==
- 2020 Canadian Screen Award nomination for Best Supporting Actress, Karen Robinson
- 2020 Canadian Screen Award nomination for Best Supporting Actor, Hugh Thompson
- 2020 ACTRA Award nomination for Outstanding Female Performance, Karen Robinson
- 2019 ACTRA Award for Best Supporting Actor, Jeremy Akerman, for the episode Oh God I Am Heartily Sorry For Having Offended You
- 2017 ACTRA Award for Best Leading Actor, Mike McLeod, Forgive Me Web Confessions for the episode Sodomy
- 2017 ACTRA Award nomination for Best Leading Actress, Keelin Jack, Forgive Me Web Confessions for the episode Revenge
- 2017 ACTRA Award nomination for Best Leading Actress, Krista MacDonald, Forgive Me Web Confessions for the episode Fornication
- 2017 Canadian Screen Award for Best Performance in a Guest Role, Dramatic Series Edward Asner
- 2016 ACTRA Award for Best Leading Actor, Mike McLeod
- 2016 ACTRA Award nomination for Best Supporting Actress, Mary-Colin Chisholm
- 2016 ACTRA Award nomination for Best Supporting Actor, Gharrett Patrick Paon
- 2015 ACTRA Award for Best Leading Actor, Mike McLeod
- 2015 ACTRA Award nomination for Best Supporting Actress, Candy Palmater
- 2015 Screen Nova Scotia Award nomination for Best TV Series
- 2015 Canadian Screen Award nomination for Best Writing in a Dramatic Series, Thom Fitzgerald for the episode Hallowed Be Thy Name
- 2015 Canadian Screen Award nomination for Best Performance by an Actor in a Continuing Leading Dramatic Role, Mike McLeod
- 2015 Canadian Screen Award nomination for Best Performance by an Actor in a Featured Supporting Role in a Dramatic Program or Series, Hugh Thompson, for the episode Hallowed Be Thy Name
- 2015 Canadian Screen Award nomination for Best Performance by an Actress in a Featured Supporting Role in a Dramatic Program or Series, Jane Alexander, for the episode Forgive Us Our Trespasses
- 2015 Canadian Screen Award nomination for Best Performance in a Guest Role, Dramatic Series, Brenda Fricker, for the episode Thy Will Be Done
- 2014 ACTRA Award for Outstanding Male Performance in a Feature Film, MOW, TV Series or Web Series, John Dunsworth, Forgive Me
- 2014 ACTRA Award for Outstanding Female Performance in a Feature Film, MOW, TV Series or Web Series, Jane Alexander, Forgive Me
- 2014 ACTRA Award Nomination for Outstanding Female Performance in a Feature Film, MOW, TV Series or Web Series, Lauren Liem, Forgive Me
- 2014 ACTRA Award nomination for Outstanding Performance by a Male, Hugh Thompson, Forgive Me
