= I Am Syd Stone =

- Directed by: Denis Theriault
- Written by: Denis Theriault
- Produced by: Colin Davis
- Starring: Gharrett Patrick Paon; Michael Gaty
- Cinematography: Kevin A. Fraser
- Edited by: Shawn Beckwith
- Music by: Ari Posner
- Release date: September 14, 2014 (AFF)
- Running time: 10 minutes
- Country: Canada
- Language: English

I Am Syd Stone is a Canadian short drama film, directed by Denis Theriault and released in 2014.

== Plot synopsis ==
The film centres on Syd Stone (Gharrett Patrick Paon), a closeted gay movie star filming a made-for-TV film called Soccer Dad, while worrying about his high school reunion. While there, he tries to mentor his young co-star, who has an emotionally abusive father. At his hotel near the movie set, Syd meets a handsome, young lawyer in town representing a defendant in a murder trial, Brent (Michael Gaty) who awakens his repressed sexuality. Matters are further complicated when his trophy girlfriend shows up unexpectedly.

== Release ==
The film was an entrant in the 2014 Iris Prize festival, and was included in Volume 12 of the Boys on Film series of LGBTQ-themed short film DVDs.

== Reinvention as serial ==
In 2019 Theriault expanded the original short film into a six-part web series. Although Paon remained associated as a producer, he and Theriault agreed to recast the lead role, which was played by Travis Nelson. In the web series, Syd Stone's career as an actor has faded; he is now on location in a small town to film a B-movie, and meets and falls for lawyer Matt (Benjamin Charles Watson) but must confront the emotional consequences of having remained closeted for the sake of his career. The series is set in the present day, and alludes to the events of the original film; however, it reportedly gives Stone a happier ending. The web series was screened at the 2020 Inside Out Film and Video Festival, in advance of its public web premiere.

Watson received a Canadian Screen Award nomination for Best Supporting Performance in a Web Program or Series at the 10th Canadian Screen Awards in 2022.
