= MIX Copenhagen =

LGBTQ+ film festival held in Copenhagen, Denmark

MIX Copenhagen LesbianGayBiTransQueer+ Film Festival is one of the oldest LGBTQ+ film festivals in the world, as well as being the oldest and one of the largest film festivals in Denmark.

== History ==
The festival has first taken place in 1986 under the name CGLFF—Copenhagen Gay & Lesbian Film Festival, making it one of the world's oldest film festivals to deal with LGBT issues. The festival adopted the MIX Copenhagen name in 2010. In 2016 it started referring to itself as an LGBTQ festival in order to be more inclusive and "give more space to stories about intersex, queer, and non-binary identities".

It has other small LGBTQ+ film festivals associated to it as MIX Århus, MIX Odense and MIX Aalborg.

== Selection and attendance ==
The festival takes place every year during the last week of October. It screens a selection of approximately 60 features, 25 documentaries and 30 short films. The festival is attended by more than 12.000 people each year.

== Awards ==
The most important award handed out at the MIX Copenhagen is the Lili Award, which is named after Lili Elbe, the first person to undergo sex reassignment surgery in the world. It is given to the best feature, best documentary and best short film chosen by an international jury, and also to the audience's voted choice as favourite film. It consists of a statuette designed by artists Yassin Askar and Sarah Borup.

== See also ==
- List of LGBT film festivals
