= Joe Barrucco =

Canadian record producer

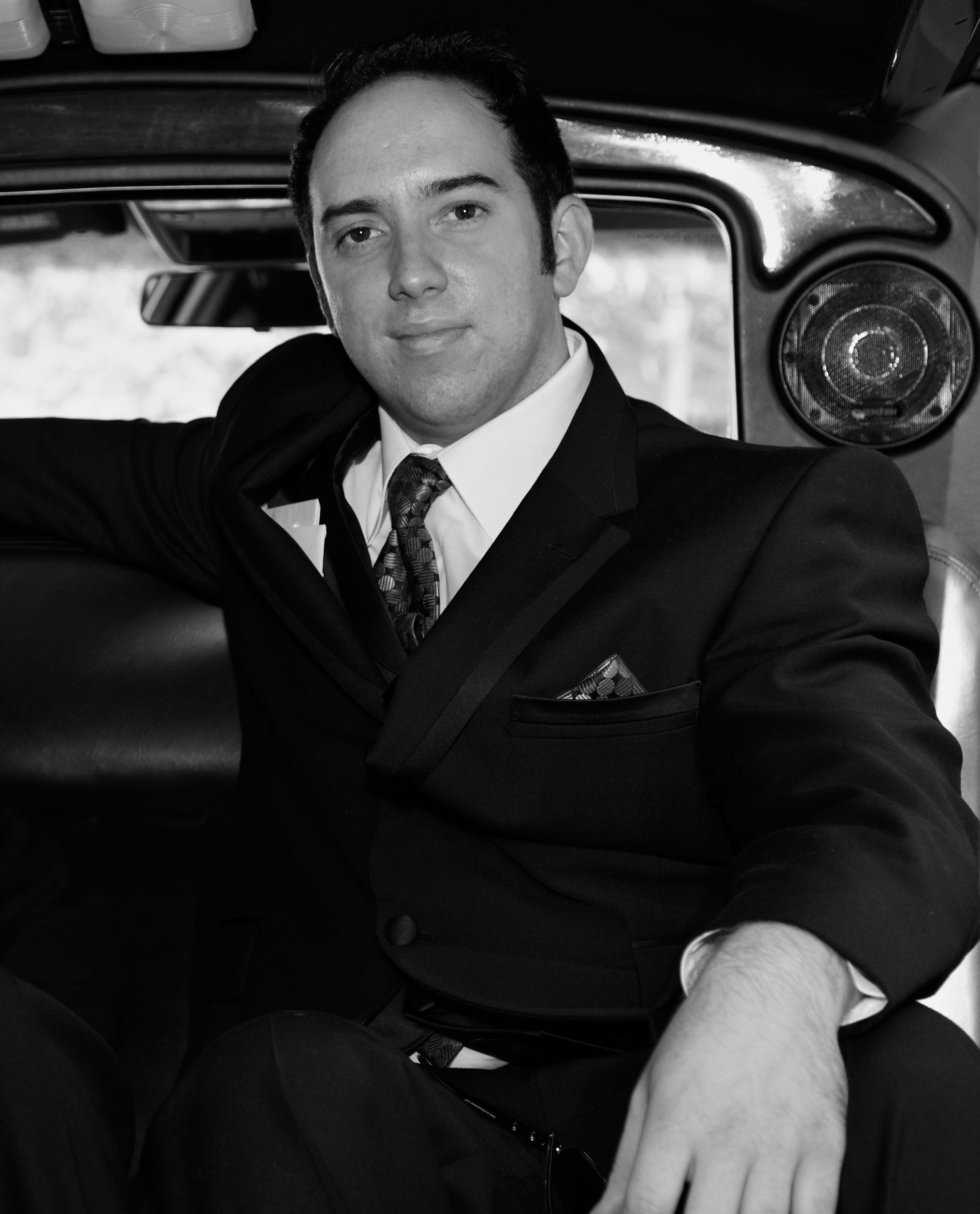

Background information
- Born: Joe Barrucco; Montreal, Quebec, Canada
- Occupations: record producer, composer, sound editor
- Years active: 2000–present
- Website: Timeline Audio

Joe Barrucco, born in Montreal, Quebec, Canada, is a Canadian record producer, composer and sound editor. In 2000, Barrucco at the age of 19 entered into the music industry as an electronic record producer for "Tycoon Records", Distributed by Sony BMG Music. At present he has a sustainable career as a record producer, sound designer and composer for films, commercials and video games.

== Early career ==
As a record producer, in 2001, Barrucco wrote and produced the song entitled Raise The Roof which was feature in the EA Sports game "NHL 2002"., The song also appeared on Don Cherry's Hockey Hits.

Between 2002 and 2004, songs he wrote and produced were nominated for three Juno Awards for Best Dance Recording of the Year, most notably the song I Know performed by Audrey

At the age of 23, In 2004 and 2005, he produced an album for Samantha Fox, entitled Angel with an Attitude.

In 2005, Barrucco sound edited and scored the music for his first film project, directed and written by Jeff Barnaby called From Cherry English, which was selected to be a part of the Sundance Film Festival.

In 2006, Barrucco completed sound and musical production on the theater play entitled J.O.B the Hip-Hopera which earned him a Los Angeles Ovation Award nomination for best sound design.

== 2009 - present career ==
In 2009, Barrucco provided the complete sound edit on his first feature-length film entitled The Sky Has Fallen: Which went on to win the best horror feature at the 2009 Global Independent Film Awards.

In 2010, Barrucco sound edited and scored the music for the film File Under Miscellaneous which was nominated for a Genie Award for Best Live Action Short Drama. He also sound edited and provided vocal production on The Legend of Beaver Dam: The film received several accolades within the film festival circuit and was honored at the 2010 Sundance film festival and received the Sundance Short Film-making Award

In 2010, the song Possible performed by Ketsia written and produced by Barrucco was ranked as one of the highest selling songs in Québec.

In 2012, Barrucco was the supervising sound editor on the film Extracted, Starring Sasha Roiz which received a South by Southwest (SXSW) audience nomination.

In 2013, Barrucco was the supervising sound editor on the film Cheap Thrills, which received the South by Southwest (SXSW) audience award

In 2014, Barrucco's music score in which he co-composed with Jeff Barnaby for the film Rhymes For Young Ghouls received a Jutra nomination

In 2014, Barrucco sound edited and provided vocal production on the film Stage Fright Starring Minnie Driver and Meat Loaf. The film received an audience award nomination at South by Southwest (SXSW).

In 2015, Barrucco scored the music for a Chevy Chase Christmas film entitled Shelby

== Family ==
Barrucco is married and has a son. His brother, Vince, is a radio personality on The Beat 92.5 Montréal under the alias of Cousin Vinny.
