= Rhymes for Young Ghouls =

2013 film by Jeff Barnaby

- Theatrical poster
- Directed by: Jeff Barnaby
- Written by: Jeff Barnaby
- Produced by: Aisling Chin-Yee; John Christou
- Starring: Kawennáhere Devery Jacobs; Glen Gould; Brandon Oakes; Mark Antony Krupa; Roseanne Supernault
- Cinematography: Michel St-Martin
- Edited by: Jeff Barnaby; Mathieu Belanger
- Music by: Jeff Barnaby; Joe Barrucco
- Distributed by: Les Films Séville; Monterey Media (USA)
- Release date: 9 September 2013 (TIFF)
- Running time: 88 minutes
- Country: Canada
- Languages: English; Mi'kmaq

Rhymes for Young Ghouls is a 2013 Canadian independent drama film and the feature-film debut of writer-director Jeff Barnaby. Set in 1976 on the fictional Red Crow Mi'kmaq reservation, it takes place in the context of the Canadian residential school system.

Although it tells the fictional story of a teenager named Aila and her plot for revenge, it is based on the history of abuse of the First Nations people by government agents, including a large number of reported cases of the mental and physical abuse of residential school children. It is presented from the perspective of a teenage girl.

== Plot ==
The film opens with a brief prologue explaining the history of Canadian First Nations children being compelled by law to attend Indian residential schools. In 1969, the prepubescent Aila lives with her father Joseph, mother Anna and younger brother Tyler at the fictional Red Crow Indian Reservation, a Mi'kmaq Indian reserve. Aila's parents consume drugs and alcohol to cope with the abuse they suffered at St. Dymphna's residential school. Tyler is killed by Anna during a drunk driving incident. The grief-stricken Anna dies by suicide while Joseph takes the blame and is imprisoned.

The film fast forwards seven years later to 1976. In her father's absence, the now-teenage Aila takes over her father's drug dealing business in the care of her uncle Burner, who himself consumes and sells drugs. To avoid being sent to St. Dymphna's school, Aila uses the proceeds from the drug money to bribe the corrupt and abusive Indian agent Popper, who runs the school. In flashback scenes, it is shown that a younger Popper was bullied by several Mi'kmaq youths including Burner. A younger Joseph comes to his aid but Popper spurns his offer of friendship and develops a hatred for the Indians in the reserve.

One day, Aila's drug money is stolen. Her predicament is complicated when her father Joseph is released from prison and returns to the Red Crow Reserve. Relations between daughter and father are initially frayed; Aila resents her father for not being there, while Joseph is unhappy that his daughter is involved in the drug business. Aila and three friends later hatch a plot to break into St. Dymphna's with the assistance of one of the resident boys, Jujijj, and steal the required money. However, Burner betrays them to Popper, who arrests Joseph on trumped-up property damage charges and sends Aila to St. Dymphna's.

During her induction, Aila is shorn of her long braids and imprisoned in a cell; while she is captive, she witnesses a vision of her brother, who guides her in a dream-state to a mass grave behind St. Dymphna's, exposing the atrocities that occurred there. She is eventually freed by a local resident boy. Seeking revenge against Popper, Aila and her friends don Halloween costumes and break into St Dymphna's. They free Joseph and steal CA$20,000 from Popper's office. After escaping, Aila reconciles with her father, who tells her that she is not to blame for the death of her mother and the cycle of abuse that occurred at St Dymphna's.

However, Popper catches up with them and knocks Joseph down with a rifle butt. Popper attempts to rape Aila but is shot dead by the same boy who freed Aila. To protect the young boy and his daughter, Joseph takes the fall for killing Popper. Gisigu, a friend of her grandfather, becomes her mentor and promises to help steer her away from the influence of drug-dealing. Aila also befriends the young boy who saved her and her father from Popper.

== Cast ==
- Kawennáhere Devery Jacobs as Aila
- Glen Gould as Joseph
- Brandon Oakes as Burner
- Mark Antony Krupa as Popper
- Roseanne Supernault as Anna
- Cody Bird as Sholo
- Nathan Alexis as Angus
- Kent McQuaid as Milch
- Katherine Sorbey as Ceres

== Production ==
=== Inspiration and mission ===
In a press release following the films announcement, Barnaby noted that he was "one of the rare Indians whose introduction to his heritage on film did not come from a misrepresented stereotype but from another native filmmaker whose subject was a member of [his] own community." This was in reference to documentary filmmaker Alanis Obomsawin's visit to his home community on the Mi'kmaq reserve of Listuguj in 1981; Obomsawin had come to document the resistance of a community member to raids by Sûreté du Québec sparked by conflicts over salmon fishing rights in the area. Barnaby stated that, "from that moment on," having witnessed the man's testimony, he "equated film with social protest, pride and strength." In the release, he surmised that "if I could sum up a mission statement with one phrase, 'I want to make being Indian cool again.' I want to take our images, our lives, our languages and represent them truthfully on screen".

Speaking to the CBC ahead of the film's premiere, Barnaby stated that his choice to pursue Rhymes came as an attempt to "deviate from the 'hyper-masculine' stories [he had] tackled in the past", with Aila's character being inspired by the "'strong, hard-headed women' in his life". Barnaby's setting of the film in concomitance with the "collapse of the residential school system" situates the protagonist "'in a place and time where it wasn't very popular to be a woman or to be native'". He expanded upon this idea in an interview with Muskrat Magazine following the film's release:

My Nation is a matriarchal society, and paying respect to that archetype of a woman and the strength that is there particularly in First Nations women, it’s imperative for me as a First Nations man who loves his mom, and loves his wife and loves his sisters, to pay reverence to their struggle and their strength. I think women are awesome! [...] I thought, if there was ever a point in time that this residential school was going to crumble it would have been in the 70’s, it just made sense to me to have a young Native girl bring this institution of ugliness to its knees. It made sense to me because First Nations women are the language and cultural keepers, they are the epicenter of our matriarchal society. I’ve mostly only known strength to come from the women in my life. Which isn’t to say that the men haven’t been influential, but the rock steady power that doesn’t waiver seems to come from women.

Barnaby denied that the film was politically charged or motivated in any deliberate manner. Speaking to the CBC, he remarked:

I think the film is political insofar that it has natives in it, but it's not something I deliberately set out to do...There is no pulpit-dumping, once-we-were-warriors speeches or anything like that. It's just a story that just so happens to have a little bit of political ideology and edge to it. But by and large, it's a story first, a very cinematic story, borderline exploitation film.

=== Conception and development ===
Rhymes for Young Ghouls was first envisioned in 2010 amid the premiere of Barnaby's short film File Under Miscellaneous at the Toronto International Film Festival (TIFF). CFC Features from the Canadian Film Centre was the first group to support the project in development, followed soon after by the Quebec government's Society for the Development of Cultural Enterprises (SODEC), the Quebec Arts Council, Telefilm, and the Harold Greenberg Fund. In 2012, the film was selected for the Tribeca All-Access Program, providing it with access to workshops and support from industry professionals with the intent of assisting writers from under-represented communities. The writers pitched the script at the Tribeca Film Festival to a jury composed of actors Cuba Gooding Jr., Rosario Dawson, and Gabourey Sidibe, who unanimously voted to award them the Festival's $10,000 Creative Promise Award.

Prospector Films of Montreal produced the film, which was shot from 21 October to 22 November 2012. It was announced to the public on 23 October, 2012. The pre-production and production phases took place on the Kahnawake Mohawk Reserve and in Montreal. Post-production occurred through the first half of 2013 in Montreal.

=== Casting and recruitment ===
The first character to be cast in the film was Mi'kmaq actor and musician Glen Gould, a regular partner of Barnaby's, as Joseph. Out of a pool of 70 actresses from across North America, then-19-year old Kawennáhere Devery Jacobs was chosen to play the role of Aila. Following Barnaby's death from cancer in 2022, Jacobs noted that, "[h]aving nearly given up on this career, he not only took a chance on me, but fought relentlessly to cast me...". Many senior production roles were filled by longtime associates of Barnaby. The cast was made up of several indigenous actors, including Gould, Roseanne Supernault (Métis), as well as Jacobs and Brandon Oakes (Mohawk).

== Release and reception ==
Rhymes for Young Ghouls had its world premiere at the Toronto International Film Festival on 9 September 2013. It was then chosen to be screened at TIFF's 13th annual Canada's Top Ten Film Festival in January of the following year. Its first theatrical release was on 31 January 2014 in Toronto. Seville Pictures was responsible for Canadian distribution, with eOne handling international sales.

2013 was characterized by the CBC as a "big year for First Nations films at TIFF", with Rhymes premiering at the festival alongside Obosamwin's Hi-Ho Mistahey! and Peter Stebbing's Empire of Dirt. The film was specially screened at the National Museum of the American Indian on 30 October, 2014 with Barnaby and Jacobs in attendance.

=== Critical response ===
Rhymes for Young Ghouls received largely positive reviews from critics. On the review aggregator website Rotten Tomatoes, the film holds a critic approval rating of 88% based on 8 reviews. The film was met with critical acclaim for its realist depiction of native experience, particularly via the fusion of horror elements and traditional indigenous storytelling techniques. Jacobs was widely praised for her performance in the leading role, Los Angeles Times describing her as "[the film's] most potent weapon...a remarkably self-possessed actress whose fearless performance brings to mind a younger Ellen Page". Barnaby was similarly lauded for the film's cinematography, with The Hollywood Reporter describing it as "impressive for its atmospheric evocation of its little-seen milieu", and "effectively blend[ing] menace and humor" to "[deal] with an unfortunate period in its country’s history with darkly imaginative flair".

Writing for ScreenAnarchy from the TIFF premiere, critic Jason Gorber commended what he described as a "harrowing, explosive debut" from Barnaby, interpreting the film to be both "highly specific to [the Mi'kmaq] community, yet near mythic in a more universal, classic sense". Pre-empting concerns over the film's depiction of white narrative figures, he contended that their portrayal, though "needlessly one-dimensional", was executed as it was "for overt story reasons more than ideological [ones]". Nevertheless, Gorber roundly praised Barnaby's multilayered storytelling, the narrative complexity of its native subjects, and the combined performance of its ensemble cast, considering Rhymes to be "a startling, unsettling narrative...that should solidify [it] as a future touchstone in both Native and English Canadian cinema".

In a 2018 listing for National Indigenous Television, Rhymes for Young Ghouls was noted as passing the Bechdel Test, a criteria formulated in 1985 as a measure of female representation and agency in storytelling. Upon announcing his retirement in 2023, longtime TIFF programmer and film critic Steve Gravestock listed Rhymes among his top three favorite Canadian films to have been screened at the festival, stating that "Jeff was a really unique voice [...] the way he mixed genres to tell a very serious and true story was important."

== In popular culture ==
The film inspired the creation of The Aila Test, later renamed The Ali Nahdee Test after its creator, Anishinaabe writer Ali Nahdee. Nahdee first formulated the test in Finland in the late 2010s amid the Dakota Access Pipeline protests in the United States, seeing it as a means of supporting the indigenous cause despite the distance between her and the movement's physical and political center. It is meant to serve as a litmus test for analyzing the representation of Indigenous female characters in narrative. Similar in character to the Bechdel Test, The Aila Test consists of three questions, originally specified as follows:

(1) Is she an Indigenous/Aboriginal woman who is a main character;

(2) who does not fall in love with a white man;

(3) and does not end up raped or murdered at any point in the story?

Narratives that pass the test include Barnaby's Rhymes for Young Ghouls, Whale Rider by Niki Caro, Disney's Moana, Nickelodeon's The Legend of Korra, and the 2014 video game Never Alone. Nahdee explained the name-change as deriving from a sense that she had appropriated the identity of someone else's character for her own purposes. As she described, Barnaby himself had stated that she was "using his work to market [her]self." Finding herself torn by this fact, she chose to formally rename the test and its associated social media handles, and to expand the test to encompass a broader, more comprehensive set of criteria in April of 2022. According to Nahdee, in order to pass the Ali Nahdee test, a narrative must now have:

1. An Indigenous woman who is a main character…This includes ANY existing indigenous group as well as fictional Indigenous-coded characters...This includes trans women / femmes...Must be portrayed by an Indigenous actress if the story is live action
2. Who does not fall in love with a white man…Love and sex are not the same thing...Can fall in love with a white woman / Enby
3. Who isn't raped and does not die at any point in the story...This includes before and after the events of the narrative.

== Awards ==
Awards
Date	Award	Category	Result	Refs.
2012	Tribeca All Access	$10,000, Creative Promise Award for Narrative	Won	
2013	Vancouver International Film Festival	Best Canadian Film; Co-winner with That Burning Feeling	Won	
2014	2013 Canadian Screen Awards	Best Performance by an Actress in a Leading Role (Kawennáhere Devery Jacobs)	Nominated	
2014	Technicolor Clyde Gilmour Award	$50 000 in services from Technicolor, selected by Norman Jewison	Won	
2014	Vancouver Film Critics Circle Award	Best Director of a Canadian Film (Jeff Barnaby)	Won	
2014	Vancouver Film Critics Circle Award	Best First Film by a Canadian Director	Nominated	
2014	American Indian Film Festival	Best Actor (Glen Gould)	Won	
2014	American Indian Film Festival	Best Director (Jeff Barnaby)	Won	
2014	Seattle International Film Festival	New Director's Showcase Award (Jeff Barnaby)	Nominated	
2014	Munich Film Festival	CineVision Award for Best Film by an Emerging Director (Jeff Barnaby)	Nominated	
2015	Jutra Awards	Meilleure Musique Originale [Best Score] (Jeff Barnaby and Joe Barrucco)	Nominated	

== Further reading and additional media ==
- "Rhymes for Young Ghouls director likes to lean on other art forms". The Globe and Mail. 30 January 2014.
- CBC (9 March 2015). "Best of Q: Jeff Barnaby on revenge fantasy and Rhymes for Young Ghouls". CBC Radio.
- "TIFF's native-Canadian features leave stereotypes in the dust". The Globe and Mail. 9 September 2013.
