= Jordan Wheeler =

Cree-Canadian writer

Jordan Wheeler (born 1964) is a Cree-Canadian writer. Along with numerous children's books, Wheeler has written scripts for the APTN and CBC. He's also received a Gemini Award for Best Writing in a Children's or Youth Program or Series for his work on renegadepress.com.

He is a member of the George Gordon First Nation in Saskatchewan.

== Publications ==
- Brothers In Arms, published 1989 by Pemmican Publications
- Adventure on Thunder Island with Edna King, published January 1, 1991 by James Lorimer Limited
- Tapping the Gift: Manitoba's First People, published 1992 by Pemmican Publications
- All My Relations: An Anthology of Contemporary Canadian Native Fiction, published December 31, 1992 by University of Oklahoma Press
- Just a Walk, illustrated by Christopher Auchter, published 1993 by Theytus Books
- Tortured People: The Politics of Colonization with Howard Adams, published 1992 by Theytus Books
- Christmas at Wapos Bay with Dennis Jackson, published October 17, 2005 by Coteau Books
- Chuck in the City, illustrated by Christopher Auchter, published January 1, 2009 by Theytus Books
- The First Fry Bread: A Gitxsan Story with M. Jane Smith, illustrated by Ken N. Mowatt, published November 20, 2012 by FriesenPress
- Digital Ogichida, published January 1, 2013 by Ningwakwe Learning Press
- Boog the Bug, published August 24, 2015 by Pemmican Publications

== Filmography ==
Film & TV Credits
| Year | Program | Episode(s) | Role(s) |
|---|---|---|---|
| 2012–2014 | Arctic Air | The Fall PT.1 (2014); Flying Solo (2014); Ts'inada (2013); Bombs Away (2013); New North (2012); Northern Lights (2012); The Fall PT.2 (2014); The Fall PT.1 (2014); Last Drop (2014); Rites of Passage (2014); The Fugitive (2014); Flying Solo (2014); On the Edge (2014); The Devils You Know (2014); The Finish Line (2014); The Fling (2014); High Water (2014); The River (2014); Ts'inada (2013); Fool Me Once (2013); Blood Is Thicker Than Water (2013); Skeletons in the Closet (2013); Hell Hath No Fury (2013); Secrets & Lies (2013); There's Gold in Them Thar Hills (2013); Dangerous Cargo (2013); Old Wounds (2013); Stormy Weather (2013); Open Season (2013); Bombs Away (2013); Wildfire (2013); Drop in for Lunch (2012); New North (2012); The Professional (2012); Vancouver Is Such a Screwed Up City (2012); C-TVAK (2012); Northern Lights (2012); All the Vital Things (2012); Hijacked (2012); All In (2012); Out of a Clear Blue Sky (2012) | Writer, Creative Producer, Consulting Producer |
| 2010 | Cashing In | Last Shot Wins (2010); From Dubai with Love (2010) | Writer |
| 2004–2008 | Renegadepress.com | Lost and Found (2008); Reclamation (2008); Legacies: Residential Schools (2007); Civic Pride: Teen Responsibility (2007); Rules of Engagement (2007); The Retrospective (2007); The Dance (2006); Stolen Lives (2006); The Rez (2006); Homeward Bound (2006); Dying to Connect (2005); Mano a Mano (2005); Union (2005); The Ride (2005); Just Cause (2004); Some of My Best Friends Are Indian (2004); Hard to Hold (2004); A Real Connection (2004) | Writer, Supervising Producer |
| 2002, 2006 | Wapos Bay | A Time to Learn (2006); Journey Through Fear (2006); They Dance at Night (2006); Christmas at Wapos Bay | Writer, Story Editor |
| 2002 | The Lost World | Star Bright (2002) ... (writer); Crystal Clear (2002) ... (writer); Crystal Ball ... (writer) | Writer |
| 2002 | Tipi Tales | Full series | Writer |
| 2000 | Mentors | The Glory Trail (2000) | Writer |
| 1999 | Prairie Berry Pie | Cooperation (1999) | Writer |
| 1998 | The Adventures of Shirley Holmes | The Case of Second Take (1998); The Case of the Exploding Puppet (1998) ... (written by) | Writer |
| 1997 | No Turning Back | | Writer |
| 1996–1997 | The Rez | Wendigo (1997) ... (written by); Too Many Chiefs (1997) ... (written by); Poster Girl (1997) ... (written by); Granted (1997) ... (written by); A Rock and a Hard Place (1997) ... (written by); Golf and Politics (1996) | Writer |
| 1993–1996 | North of 60 | Prodigal Son (1996) ... (writer); A Shot Rang Out (1995) ... (writer); Arrival and Departure (1995) ... (writer); Break Dance (1994) ... (writer); Spin Dry (1994) ... (writer); Partners (1994) ... (writer); Raven (1993) ... (writer); Miles to Go (1993) ... (writer); The Art of the Deal (1993) ... (writer) | Writer |

== Awards ==
Awards
| Year | Award | Product | Result | Cite |
|---|---|---|---|---|
| 1995 | Gemini Award for Best Writing in a Dramatic Series | North of 60 (1992) | Nominee | |
| 2005 | Gemini Award for Best Writing in a Children's or Youth Program or Series | Renegadepress.com: "Dying to Connect" (2004) | Nominee | |
| 2006 | Gemini Award for Best Writing in a Children's or Youth Program or Series | Renegadepress.com series (2004) | Nominee | |
| 2006 | Gemini Award for Best Writing in a Children's or Youth Program or Series | Renegadepress.com: "The Rez" (2004) | Winner | |
| 2007 | Writers Guild of Canada Youth Award | Renegadepress.com: "The Rez" (2004) | Nominee | |
| 2008 | Writers Guild of Canada Youth Award | Renegadepress.com: "The Third Wheel" 2004) | Nominee | |
| 2010 | Paris Book Festival for Children's Literature | Just a Walk | Runner Up | |
| 2010 | Paris Book Festival for Children's Literature | Chuck in the City | Honorable Mention | |
