= Hybrid (2007 film) =

2007 television film

- DVD cover
- Genre: Thriller
- Written by: Arne Olsen
- Directed by: Yelena Lanskaya
- Starring: Justine Bateman; Tinsel Korey; William MacDonald; Gordon Tootoosis; Brandon Jay McLaren; Cory Monteith; Robert Borges; Aaron Hughes; Tim Kiriluk; Taj Moryl; Wayne Nicklas; Susanna Portnoy; Craig Skene; Sean Skene; Brett Sorensen; Gordon Tanner; Richard Dean Thomas; Khushal katira Will Woytowich; Robert Norsworthy
- Music by: Terry Frewer
- Countries of origin: United States; Canada
- Original language: English

Production
- Producer: Phyllis Laing
- Cinematography: Barry Gravelle
- Running time: 90 minutes
- Production companies: Paquin Entertainment Group; RHI Entertainment

Original release
- Network: Sci Fi Channel
- Release: August 14, 2007

Hybrid is a 2007 television film by Syfy. It is the tenth film in the Maneater film series.

== Plot ==
When Aaron Scrates, a partially blind man whose eyes were badly damaged from an accident, receives the eyes of a wolf in the first human cross-species transplant his eyesight grows better than ever. However, he finds it has additional effects; he also growls, begins to target people as prey, and begins having dreams where he is among wolves. Now he must fight for his life while learning to embrace his inner animal before he is hunted down and destroyed by those who experimented on him.

== Cast ==
- Justine Bateman as Andrea
- Tinsel Korey as Lydia
- Gordon Tootoosis as Grandpa
- Brandon Jay McLaren as Ashmore
- Cory Monteith as Aaron Scates
- Khushal Katira
- Aaron Hughes as Wilcox
- Tim Kiriluk
- Taj Moryl
- Wayne Nicklas
- Susanna Portnoy
- Craig Skene
- Sean Skene
- Brett Sorensen as Deaver
- Gordon Tanner as Phelps
- Richard Dean Thomas
- Robert Borges
- Will Woytowich as Mobley
