= Land (2018 film) =

2018 film

- Film poster
- Directed by: Babak Jalali
- Written by: Babak Jalali
- Starring: Griffin Burns
- Release date: 18 February 2018 (Berlin)
- Running time: 111 minutes
- Countries: Italy; France; Netherlands; Mexico
- Language: English

Land is a 2018 internationally co-produced drama film directed by Babak Jalali. It was screened in the Panorama section at the 68th Berlin International Film Festival.

== Cast ==
- Rod Rondeaux as Raymond Yellow Eagle
- Wilma Pelly as Mary Yellow Eagle*
- James Coleman as Wesley Yellow Eagle
- Florence C.M. Klein as Sally
- Thomas R. Baker as Major Jacobs
- Griffin Burns as Eli
- Andrew J Katers as Peter
