= Growing Op =

2008 Canadian comedy film

- Directed by: Michael Melski
- Written by: Michael Melski
- Produced by: Monique Leblanc; Michael Melski; Doug Pettigrew; Rick Warden
- Starring: Steven Yaffee; Wallace Langham; Rosanna Arquette; Katie Boland; Rachel Blanchard
- Cinematography: Christopher Ball
- Edited by: Dean Soltys
- Music by: Ian McGettigan; Andrew Scott
- Production companies: Emotion Pictures; Middlefish Films
- Distributed by: Mongrel Media
- Release date: September 12, 2008 (AIFF)
- Running time: 100 minutes
- Country: Canada
- Language: English

Growing Op is a Canadian comedy film, directed by Michael Melski and released in 2008. The film stars Steven Yaffee as Quinn, the teenage son of anti-establishment parents Bryce (Wallace Langham) and Diana (Rosanna Arquette), who run their home as a marijuana grow op. Having been homeschooled all his life, he now wants to assert his independence by enrolling in and attending conventional public high school after meeting and developing a crush on his new neighbour Crystal (Rachel Blanchard).

The cast also includes Katie Boland as Quinn's sister Hope, who's happier to take on a role in their parents' pot-dealing life, as well as Jon Cor, Darcie Cormier, Daniel MacIvor, Alberta Watson, Hugh Thompson, Bill Carr, Kate Lavender, Nicole Maillet, Brandon Ellis, Jason Daley, Denis Theriault, Jacob Button and David Vong in supporting roles.

== Production ==
The film, Melski's full-length directorial debut, drew on some aspects of his childhood, including his suburban upbringing and the fact that he had a high school girlfriend whose father ran a grow op.

The film began to take shape in the mid-2000s, while Melski was living in Vancouver and working on the television series Robson Arms, with Melski attributing the inspiration to the fact that the news at the time was continually filled with stories of home grow ops getting busted by the police.

It was shot in summer and fall 2007 in and around Moncton, New Brunswick. Thom Fitzgerald was an executive producer.

== Distribution ==
The film premiered as the Atlantic Gala at the 2008 Atlantic International Film Festival, before going into commercial release in November.

A DVD release followed in 2009.

== Reception ==
Scott Gray of Exclaim! opined that the film plays like "a family-friendly, Canadian version of Weeds, done as a low budget film", concluding that it was "a well-acted piece with enough charm and humour to make it an enjoyable viewing but writer/director Melski should have decided if he was making a comedy or a drama and balanced the script appropriately."

Also for Exclaim!, Robert Bell published a separate review at the time of the 2009 DVD release, writing that "when the film flows organically within this ironic environment it proves amusing and engaging, but struggles when introducing broader comic pratfalls and eventually succumbs to didactics and morality. While these latter follies are distracting and occasionally groan-inducing, as are many of the teen social trappings within the high school environment, they don't ruin what is essentially a feel good dramedy for anyone whose eyebrow has ever been raised by the idiosyncrasies of the moral majority."

For Now, Glenn Sumi rated the film two out of five, writing that it fizzled as a comedy but at least answered the question of what ever happened to Rosanna Arquette. He praised the rapport of Langham and Arquette as the parents and the confident performance of Boland, but wrote that Yaffee was far too "recessive" an actor to carry off the more dramatic later parts of the film.
