= Drew Hayden Taylor =

Canadian playwright, author and journalist

- Born: 1 July 1962 (age 64); Curve Lake, Ontario, Canada
- Occupations: Playwright, author, journalist
- Awards: Indspire Award for Arts (2021)
- Website: http://www.drewhaydentaylor.com/

Drew Hayden Taylor (born 1 July 1962) is an Indigenous Canadian playwright, author and journalist.

== Life and career ==
Born in Curve Lake, Ontario, Taylor is of both Ojibwe and white ancestry. About his background Taylor says: "I plan to start my own nation. Because I am half Ojibway half Caucasian, we will be called the occasions. And of course, since I’m founding the new nation, I will be a special occasion." He also mused in a Globe and Mail essay: "Fighting over status/non-status, Métis, skin colour etc., only increases the sense of dysfunction in our community."

He writes about First Nations culture and has also been a frequent contributor to various magazines including This Magazine. His writing includes plays, short stories, essays, newspaper columns and film and television work. In 2004 he was appointed to the Ontario Ministry of Culture Advisory Committee.

As well as his writing, Taylor has been the artistic director of Native Earth Performing Arts, and has taught at the Centre for Indigenous Theatre. He co-created the series Mixed Blessings for APTN in 2007, and has been a writer for The Beachcombers, Street Legal and North of 60, and has made documentary films for CBC Television, including Searching for Winnetou, Cottagers and Indians and The Pretendians.

Taylor has held writer-in-residence positions at Native Earth Performing Arts, Cahoots Theatre, the University of Michigan, The University of Western Ontario, the Stephen Leacock Festival, the Blyth Festival, Lüneburg University, and Ryerson University (now Toronto Metropolitan University).

He won an Indspire Award for Arts in 2021.

Le Baiser de Nanabush, the French translation of Taylor's Motorcycles & Sweetgrass, was selected for the 2023 edition of Le Combat des livres, where it will be defended by social media personality Xavier Watso.

== Partial bibliography ==
Drew Hayden Taylor talks about Motorcycles and Sweetgrass on Bookbits radio.

=== Non-fiction ===
- Funny, You Don't Look Like One (1998)
- Further Adventures of a Blue-Eyed Ojibway: Funny, You Don’t Look Like One #2 (1999)
- Furious Observations of a Blue-Eyed Ojibway: Funny, You Don’t Look Like One #3 (2002)
- Futile observations of the Blue-Eyed Ojibway: Funny, You Don’t Look Like One #4 (2004)
- NEWS: Postcards from the Four Directions (2010)
- The Best of Funny, You Don’t Look Like One (anthology from first three editions) (2015)
- Me Tomorrow: Indigenous Views On the Future (2021)

=== Collections edited ===
- Voices: Being Native in Canada, with Linda Jaine (1992)
- Me Funny (2006)
- Me Sexy (2008)
- Drew Hayden Taylor: Essays on His Works (2008)
- Me Artsy (2015)

=== Fiction ===
- Fearless Warriors (short stories) (1998)
- The Night Wanderer: A Native Gothic Novel (2007)
- Motorcycles and Sweetgrass (novel) (2010)
- The Night Wanderer: A Graphic Novel, illustrated by Mike Wyatt (2013)
- Take Us To Your Chief: and Other Stories (short stories) (2016)
- Chasing Painted Horses (novel) (2019)
- Cold (novel) (2024)
- Open House (2025)
- Sucker Falls (2026)

=== Plays produced ===
(By year of first production)

- Toronto at Dreamer’s Rock (1989)
- Education is Our Right (1990)
- Talking Pictures (1990)
- The Bootlegger Blues (1990)
- Someday (1991)
- The All Complete Aboriginal Show Extravaganza (1994)
- Girl Who Loved Her Horses (1995)
- The Baby Blues (1995)
- 400 Kilometres (1996)
- Only Drunks and Children Tell the Truth (1996)
- alterNatives (1999)
- Toronto@DreamersRock.com (1999)
- The Boy in the Treehouse (2000)
- The Buz’Gem Blues (2001)
- Sucker Falls (2001)
- Raven Stole the Sun (2004)
- In a World Created by a Drunken God (2004)
- The Berlin Blues (2007)
- Three Tricksters (2009)
- Dead White Writer on the Floor (2010)
- God and The Indian (2013)
- Cerulean Blue (2014)
- Spirit Horse (2016)
- Cottagers and Indians (2018)
