= Michael Melski =

Canadian playwright and filmmaker (1969–2025)

- Born: Michael Andrew Melski; May 19, 1969; Cape Breton Regional Municipality, Nova Scotia, Canada
- Died: July 18, 2025 (aged 56)
- Education: Canadian Film Centre
- Occupations: Playwright; filmmaker
- Years active: 1995–2020

Michael Andrew Melski (May 19, 1969 – July 18, 2025) was a Canadian playwright and filmmaker from Sydney, Nova Scotia.

== Early life and education ==
Melski was born in Cape Breton Regional Municipality, Nova Scotia, on May 19, 1969.

Melski studied screenwriting at the Canadian Film Centre in the 1990s, with his early screenplays including the films Mile Zero and Touch & Go.

== Career ==
Melski began his career as a playwright. His plays Heartspent and Black Silence were published in book form in 1996, as the two-play volume Blood on Steel. He ultimately became best known for his 1995 play Hockey Mom, Hockey Dad, which was widely produced across Canada.

Melski's other plays included The Fly Fisher's Companion, and Miles from Home.

Melski released Growing Op, his debut film as a director, in 2008. He followed up in 2013 with Charlie Zone.

In 2016, Melski released the documentary film Perfume War, and in 2019 he released his final narrative feature film, The Child Remains. His 2020 documentary film Rare Bird Alert was broadcast by CBC Television in 2020 as an episode of CBC Docs POV.

Throughout his career, Melski also served as an artist in residence for various theatre companies, including the Shaw Festival, Neptune Theatre and Eastern Front Theatre.

== Death ==
Melski died on July 18, 2025, at the age of 56.
