= Charlie Zone =

- Directed by: Michael Melski
- Written by: Joseph LeClair; Michael Melski
- Produced by: Brent Barclay; Tracey Boulton; Joseph LeClair; Michael Melski; Hank White
- Starring: Glen Gould; Amanda Crew
- Cinematography: Christopher Ball
- Edited by: Christopher Cooper
- Music by: John W.D. Mullane
- Release date: September 2011 (AIFF)
- Running time: 103 minutes
- Country: Canada
- Languages: English; French

Charlie Zone is a 2011 Canadian crime thriller drama film directed by Michael Melski and starring Glen Gould and Amanda Crew.

== Plot ==
Avery Paul is hired to kidnap a runaway from a crack house and return her to her family.

== Cast ==
- Glen Gould as Avery Paul
- Amanda Crew as Jan
- Cindy Sampson as Kelly
- Mpho Koaho as Donny
- Jennie Raymond as Ava

== Release ==
The film premiered at the Atlantic International Film Festival in September 2011. It was released theatrically in Toronto on March 1, 2013.

== Reception ==
Adam Nayman of The Globe and Mail awarded the film two and a half stars out of four and wrote, "There isn't a whole lot of style to Charlie Zone, but the movie-making is as determined and efficient (and thrifty) as Avery himself."

Bruce DeMara of the Toronto Star also awarded the film two and a half stars out of four and wrote, "Charlie Zone, with its dark vision, intricate plot and noir-ish style, suggests Melski is a Canadian filmmaker to watch."
