= Tina Lameman =

Canadian actress

Tina Lameman is a Cree actress from Canada. She is most noted for her appearance in the film Monkey Beach, for which she received a Vancouver Film Critics Circle nomination for Best Supporting Actress in a Canadian Film at the Vancouver Film Critics Circle Awards 2020, and won the award for Best Supporting Actress at the 2020 American Indian Film Festival.

A member of the Beaver Lake Cree Nation from Alberta, she was also a star of the APTN drama series Mixed Blessings in the 2000s, and appeared in the films Road to Saddle River and Circle of Steel.
