= Glen Gould =

Canadian actor

- Born: June 6, 1971 (age 55); Sydney, Nova Scotia, Canada
- Occupations: Actor, director, producer
- Years active: 1989–present

Glen Gould (born June 6, 1971) is an Indigenous Canadian actor, director and producer of Miꞌkmaq and Italian descent. Between 2016 and 2020, he played the role of detective Jerry Commanda on the television series Cardinal.

== Career ==
Gould began performing professionally in Tomson Highway's theatrical troupe, Native Earth Performing Arts (to which Billy Merasty had referred him), and in Theatre New Brunswick; however, his career went on hiatus in 1992 when his parents were killed in a car accident.

Gould resumed performing in 1994, and has subsequently appeared in many Canadian television programs, including Cashing In, Blackstone, North of 60, Cardinal and Tribal, and films, including The Colony, File Under Miscellaneous, Rhymes for Young Ghouls, North Mountain, Monkey Beach, Girl and Bones of Crows.

In 2011, Gould won the Outstanding Performance Award at the Atlantic Film Festival for his role in the film Charlie Zone, and in 2026 he won the same award for Jeffrey's Turn.

== Family ==
Gould's uncle was Donald Marshall Jr., whose wrongful conviction for murder occurred the day before Gould's birth: Gould's pregnant mother was so shocked by the verdict that she went into labour with him. His first acting role was a minor part in the 1989 film adaptation of Michael Harris's 1986 book Justice Denied, which explored the events leading to Marshall's conviction.

Gould's grandfather was Donald Marshall Sr. His daughter is actress Na'ku'set Gould.

== Filmography ==
=== Film ===
Film
Year	Title	Role	Notes
2001	The Hot Karl	Deetz	Direct-to-video
2001	Lola	Cafe Owner	
2002	The People Dance	Man	
2002	Yellowknife	George	
2002	Shattered Souls	Tom	Direct-to-video
2003	The Hot Karl II	Deetz	Direct-to-video
2004	The Reawakening	David Hill	
2007	The Colony	Maytag	Short film
2008	Older than America	Steve Klamath	Credited as Glenn Gould; Also known as American Evil
2010	File Under Miscellaneous	Indian Man	Short film
2011	Charlie Zone	Avery Paul	
2013	Rhymes for Young Ghouls	Joseph	
2014	Wolves	Dart Player	
2015	North Mountain	Crane	Producer
2018	Through Black Spruce	Joe	
2019	Cold Pursuit	War Dog	
2020	The Ghost Witch	Man	Short film Writer; Producer; Director; Editor; Cinematographer
2020	Monkey Beach	Josh	
2020	Girl	Barkeep	
2021	8:37 Rebirth	Jared	Producer
2022	Bones of Crows	Matthew Spears	
2023	Last Straw	Sheriff Brooks	
2024	The Birds Who Fear Death	Faddy	
2025	At the Place of Ghosts (Sk+te’kmujue’katik)		
2026	Jeffrey's Turn	Arty	Writer; Producer; Director
TBA	Untitled Pet Sematary Project	Mi'kmaq Chief	Post-production
TBA	Junction Row	Archie	Post-production
TBA	The S Word: Surviving Suicide	—N/a	Documentary; Pre-production; Producer; Editor

=== Television ===
Television
Year	Title	Role	Notes
1989	Justice Denied		Uncredited
1994	E.N.G.	Donald Mackenzie	Season 5, episode 9: "Power Politics"
1995	Forever Knight	Young Gary	Season 3, episode 4: "Blackwing"
1997	North of 60	Alvin Bran	Season 5, episode 13: "The Higher Law"
1999	Cold Squad	Freeman	Season 2, episode 15: "Nancy Seniuk"
1999	First Wave	Dealer	Season 2, episode 7: "Prayer for the White Man"
2000–2003	Yvon of the Yukon	Bill Tukyuk / CD Local / Old Man / Additional voices	Voice; 16 episodes
2001	Crossfire Trail	Bear Killer	TV movie
2001	Dark Angel	Prisoner	Season 1, episode 18: "Pollo Loco"
2001	So Weird	Thomas Morning Sun / Coyote	Season 3, episode 25: "Annie's Song"
2002	Relic Hunter	Native Dark Feather Man	Season 3, episode 13: "Fire in the Sky"
2002	Mary-Kate and Ashley in Action!	Additional voices	Voice; 2 episodes
2002	Stargate Infinity	Additional voice	Episode 1: "Decision"
2002–2003	Da Vinci's Inquest	Rob Walker	3 episodes
2003	Black Sash	Thug	Episode 2: "Jump Start"
2004	The Chris Isaak Show	Sam	Season 3, episode 1: "The Family of Man"
2004	Traffic	Dispatcher	Miniseries
2004	The Life	Crack Addict #2	TV movie
2004	Temps Dur	Roy Craig	5 episodes
2005	The 4400	Eric Papequash	Season 2, episode 4: "Weight of the World"
2005	Johnny Tootall	Bill's Narration	Voice; TV movie
2005–2006	Da Vinci's City Hall	Clarke Messner	6 episodes
2007	Elijah	Phil Fontaine	TV movie
2009	Diamonds	Archibald Nighthorse	TV movie
2009–2014	Cashing In	John Eagle	22 episodes
2010–2017	Mohawk Girls	Sose / Steve	18 episodes
2014–2015	Blackstone	Smokey Stoney	7 episodes
2015	Murdoch Mysteries	Migizi Pimise	Season 8, episode 11: "All That Glitters"
2015	Hard Rock Medical	Doug	Season 2, episode 3: "Prison Confidential"
2015–2017	Dominion Creek	Chief Isaac	8 episodes
2016	Cold	Lorne Rouselee	Episode 4: "Starlight Tour"
2017	The Strain	Ben	4 episodes
2017–2020	Cardinal	Det. Jerry Commanda	21 episodes
2020	FBI: Most Wanted	Leonard Waters	Season 1, episode 7: "Ghosts"
2020	Tribal	Gordon Thundercloud	2 episodes
2021	The Secret History of the Wild West	Jerry Potts	Episode 1: "Louder than Words"
2021	Unsettled	Edward	3 episodes
2022	Diggstown		Season 4, episode 3: "Donald Kitpu Christmas"
2022	Tulsa King	Jimmy "The Creek"	10 episodes
2022	Outlander	Chief Bird	3 episodes
2023	Spirit Rangers	Deneege	Voice; Season 2, episode 5: "Moose on the Loose/The Big Stink"
