= Rabbit Fall =

- Genre: supernatural drama
- Created by: Joadie Jurgova
- Starring: Andrea Menard; Kevin Jubinville; Peter Stebbings; Peter Kelly Gaudreault; Tinsel Korey; Booth Savage; Patrick Bird
- Country of origin: Canada
- No. of seasons: 2
- No. of episodes: 14

Production
- Executive producers: Bob Crowe; Waly Start
- Producers: Jennifer Podemski; Avi Federgreen
- Production locations: Saskatoon, Saskatchewan
- Running time: 30 minutes

Original release
- Network: Space; APTN; SCN
- Release: November 9, 2007 – December 16, 2008

Rabbit Fall is a Canadian television supernatural drama series, which aired on Space, APTN and Saskatchewan Communications Network.

The series stars Andrea Menard as Tara Wheaton, a police officer of Métis descent who takes a job in Rabbit Fall, a remote town in northern Saskatchewan with a history of unexplained events. She is reluctant to accept the community's supernatural explanations for the events, but finds that the events challenge her sense of rationality. The series was shot primarily in the community of Duck Lake, Saskatchewan.

The show's cast also includes Kevin Jubinville, Peter Stebbings, Peter Kelly Gaudreault, Tinsel Korey, Patrick Bird, Tamara Podemski and Booth Savage.

Produced by Angel Entertainment, the series premiered in 2007 with a six-episode first season which aired solely on APTN. Its eight-episode second season aired in 2008 on both APTN and Space. The series has not produced any further episodes since 2008, but has sometimes aired in repeats on both APTN and SCN as recently as the late 2010s.

Menard received a Gemini Award nomination for Best Actress in a Drama Series at the 24th Gemini Awards in 2009. The series was nominated for Best Drama Series at the Saskatchewan Motion Picture Industry Association's Showcase Awards in the same year.
