= Decoys (web series) =

Canadian comedy web series

Decoys is a Canadian comedy web series that premiered in 2020 on CBC Gem. It centres on a group of duck decoy carvers who are competing for the top award at the Northern Alberta Carving Cup. The series episode runtime is 10–17 minutes.

The cast includes David Pelech, Rup Magon, Kelly Van der Burg, Nelu Handa, Alice Moran, Brian Paul, Keram Malicki-Sánchez, Brandon Oakes, Tracey Hoyt and Rodrigo Fernandez-Stoll. Pelech was the creator of the series.

Decoys received two Canadian Screen Award nominations at the 9th Canadian Screen Awards in 2021, for Best Fiction Web Program or Series and Best Supporting Performance in Web Program or Series (Hoyt).

== Episodes ==
| No. overall | No. in season | Title | Directed by | Written by | Original release date |
|---|---|---|---|---|---|
| 1 | 1 | "Blanks" | Unknown | Unknown | TBA |
| 2 | 2 | "Roughouts" | Unknown | Unknown | TBA |
| 3 | 3 | "Float Check" | Unknown | Unknown | TBA |
| 4 | 4 | "Vermiculation" | Unknown | Unknown | TBA |
| 5 | 5 | "Mixer?" | Unknown | Unknown | TBA |
| 6 | 6 | "Lloyd" | Unknown | Unknown | TBA |
