= Mixed Blessings (Canadian TV series) =

Canadian television comedy-drama series

- Genre: Comedy drama
- Created by: Ric Beairsto; Ron E. Scott; Drew Hayden Taylor
- Starring: Gary Basaraba; Tina Lameman
- Country of origin: Canada
- Original language: English

Original release
- Network: APTN
- Release: 2007

Mixed Blessings is a Canadian television comedy-drama series, which aired on APTN.

The show was created by Ric Beairsto, Ron E. Scott and Drew Hayden Taylor, from an original concept by Ric Beairsto. The series stars Gary Basaraba and Tina Lameman as Hank Kowalchuk and Josie Fraser, two widowed single parents in Fort McMurray, Alberta who fall in love and are faced with the challenges of successfully blending their families despite their significantly different backgrounds: Kowalchuk is Ukrainian Canadian, while Fraser is Cree.

The show's cast also includes Kirklin Maclise, Jesse Frechette, Emma Duncan, Big Daddy Tazz, Michelle Thrush, Wilma Pelly, Emma Ashbaugh, Allen Belcourt, and Griffin Powell Arcand.

Following some criticism that the first season of the show was not particularly funny despite it having been marketed as a comedy drama, the second season was not as tightly scripted; instead, the second season featured some opportunities for the actors to incorporate some aspects of improvisational comedy into their dialogue.
