= Shelby (film) =

- Film poster
- Directed by: Brian K. Roberts
- Written by: Jeremy Wadzinski
- Story by: David Forrest
- Produced by: Michael Hamilton-Wright; Janet Wright
- Starring: John Paul Ruttan; Chevy Chase; Tom Arnold; Rob Schneider
- Cinematography: Stephen Chandler Whitehead
- Edited by: Stephen Withrow
- Music by: Joe Barrucco
- Distributed by: Anchor Bay Entertainment
- Release date: November 7, 2014
- Running time: 92 minutes
- Country: Canada
- Language: English

Shelby is a 2014 Canadian Christmas comedy film directed by Brian K. Roberts and starring John Paul Ruttan, Chevy Chase, Tom Arnold and Rob Schneider as the voice of the titular dog.

An orphaned dog is taken in on Christmas Eve and has to hide from dog catchers, parents and nasty neighbors to save Christmas.

== Cast ==
- Rob Schneider as Shelby (voice)
- Tom Arnold as Doug the Dog Catcher
- Jennifer Gibson as Rich Divorcee
- Riley Blue Roberts as Spoiled Kid
- Jefferson Brown as Edward Parker
- Natalie Lisinska as Lilly Parker
- John Paul Ruttan as Jake Parker
- Will Jester as Brent Parker
- Chevy Chase as Grandpa Geoffrey
- Christian Potenza as Uncle Stephen
- Addison Holley as Haley
- AJ Bridel as Chloe
- Drew Murphy as Sally Parker

== Reception ==
Donna Wolfe of The Dove Foundation gave the film a positive review and wrote, "This is a heartwarming tale about a family and a dog discovering the special friendship between people and animals. Filled with comedy from Chevy Chase as grandpa and Tom Arnold as the dogcatcher, the entire family will have a great time viewing this Christmas film."

== See also ==
- List of Christmas films
