= From Cherry English =

2004 short film by Jeff Barnaby

- Directed by: Jeff Barnaby
- Written by: Jeff Barnaby
- Produced by: Danièle Rohrbach
- Starring: Nathaniel Arcand
- Edited by: Paul Raphaël
- Music by: Joe Barrucco
- Production company: Nutaaq Media
- Release date: 2004
- Running time: 11 minutes
- Country: Canada
- Languages: English; Mi'kmaq

From Cherry English is a Canadian short film, directed by Jeff Barnaby and released in 2004. Barnaby's first short film, it stars Nathaniel Arcand as Traylor, a Mi'kmaq man who is taken on a hallucinogenic journey by a mysterious woman, as an allegory for the threats to indigenous identity posed by modern life.

The film won two Golden Sheaf Awards at the 2004 Yorkton Film Festival, for Best Aboriginal and Best Videography. At the 2004 imagineNATIVE Film and Media Arts Festival, it received an honorable mention for the Cynthia Lickers-Sage Award for Emerging Talent.
