= John Paul Ruttan =

Canadian actor

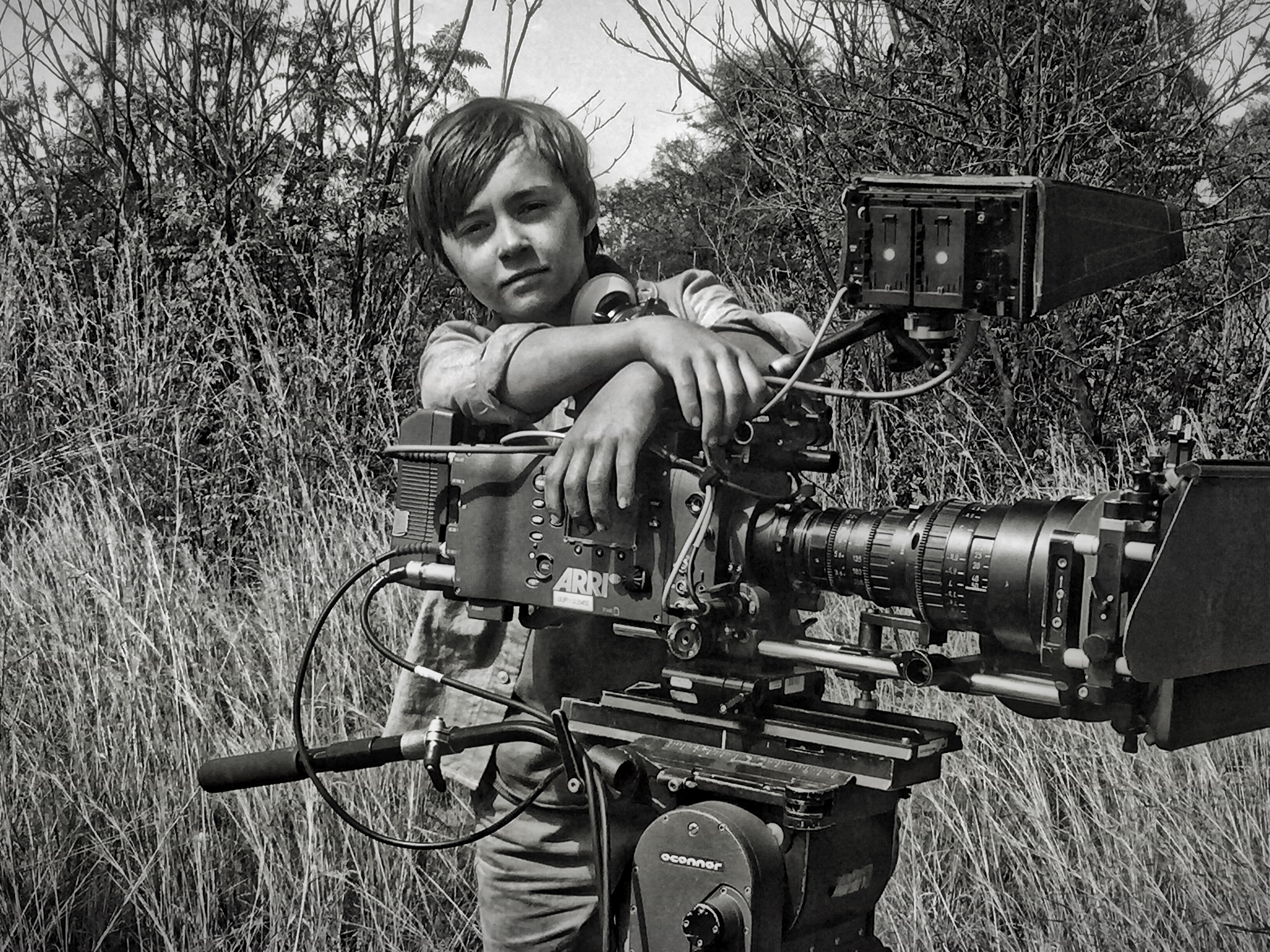
- Born: May 12, 2001 (age 25); Toronto, Ontario, Canada
- Occupation: Actor
- Years active: 2008–present

John Paul Ruttan (born May 12, 2001) is a Canadian actor who is best known for RoboCop and This Means War.

In 2012 he was nominated for the Best Performance in a Voice-Over Role at the 33rd Young Artist Awards for his work in the Doodlebops Rockin' Road Show. In 2015 he became an award winning actor with Best Performance in a Feature Film for his supporting role as RoboCop's son David Murphy in the 2014 remake of RoboCop. In 2015 he won Best Lead Performance for Shelby: The Dog Who Saved Christmas.

== Life and career ==
Ruttan was born in Toronto, Ontario. He had an early love for films and started acting at age 6, when he met with his current agent. By age 8 he had already starred in numerous television shows. In 2008 he appeared as a guest star on the Rick Mercer Report portraying a young Jack Layton, a Canadian NDP leader, on the episode "Election Kids". The following year Ruttan guest starred in the series Mighty Mama for CBC and guest starred in the Doodlebops Rockin' Road Show. Other television performances include Murdoch Mysteries, The Listener, and Degrassi: The Next Generation.

His introduction into movies were the television films The Two Mr. Kissels and Will you Merry Me?. In 2010 he performed in his first short-film, Ninety-one, written and directed by Jill Carter. Ruttan's feature film debut was in Defendor with Woody Harrelson in 2010, playing Young Jack Carter.

In 2012, Ruttan appeared in the role of Tom Hardy's character's son, Joe, in the feature film This Means War alongside Reese Witherspoon and Chris Pine. Ruttan's performance in the film earned him a Young Artist Award nomination as Best Supporting Young Actor Age Ten and Under in a Feature Film. He has also played Young William Murdoch on Murdoch Mysteries in 2014 and 2015.

Ruttan has a blue belt in karate and does his own stunt work.

== Filmography ==
Year	Film/Show	Role	Notes
2008	Rick Mercer Report	Young Jack Layton	Episode: Election Kids
2008	The Two Mr. Kissels	Boy	
2008	Will you Merry Me?	Boy	
2009	Murdoch Mysteries	Thedore Jr	Episode: "Mild Mild West"
2009	The Listener	Young Boy	
2009	Defendor	Young Jack Carter	
2010	Doodlebops	Joshua	Episode 25
2010	Ninety-one	Young Jack	
2010	Degrassi: The Next Generation	Pirate Boy	Season 9, Episode 8: Waiting for Girl Like You
2012	This Means War	Joe	
2012	I'll Follow You Down	Young Erol	
2014	RoboCop	David Murphy	
2015	Shelby	Jake	
2015	Against the Wild 2: Survive the Serengeti	Ryan	
2015	Murdoch Mysteries	Young William Murdoch	
