= Wilma Pelly =

Canadian actress (1937–2020)

- Born: Wilma Episkenew; March 5, 1937; Fort Qu'Appelle, Saskatchewan, Canada
- Died: December 28, 2020 (aged 83); Calgary, Alberta, Canada
- Occupation: actress
- Known for: North of 60

Wilma Pelly (March 5, 1937 – December 28, 2020) was an indigenous Canadian film and television actress, best known for her roles as Elsie Tsa'Che in the CBC Television drama North of 60 and as Kookum in Mixed Blessings.

== Early life ==
Born Wilma Episkenew, she was a member of the Muscowpetung Saulteaux First Nation. She met her husband James Edward Pelly in the 1950s, and moved with him to Calgary, Alberta.

== Career ==
Pelly worked in factories until launching her acting career. While recovering from a workplace injury in the late 1980s, she answered a casting call for film extras. Her breakthrough role in North of 60, beginning in 1992 and extending throughout the series and into several followup television films, made her an iconic figure in Canadian indigenous communities; her character Elsie, although not always talkative, was wise, dignified and funny, and Pelly was widely recognized as a scene-stealing performer. She was recognized by the Alberta Media Production Industries Association's Rosie Awards as Best Actress in 1998.

Following the conclusion of the regular weekly North of 60 series, Pelly was cast in Giovanni Veronesi's film Gunslinger's Revenge, the production of which marked her first time ever travelling outside of North America. She subsequently appeared in other film and television productions, usually playing an indigenous grandmother or community elder. She also had selected stage roles, most notably appearing in a 2005 production of Uncle Vanya which was staged at the Citadel Theatre in Edmonton before travelling to Ottawa for a production at the National Arts Centre.

== Death ==
She died on December 28, 2020, in Calgary. Her final film performance, in Rueben Martell's film Don't Say Its Name, was in post-production and had not yet been released at the time of her death.

== Filmography ==
=== Television ===
- North of 60 (1992-1997) - Elsie Tsa Che
- Children of the Dust (1995) - Nita
- In the Blue Ground (1999) - Elsie Tsa Che
- Dream Storm (2001) - Elsie Tsa Che
- Another Country (2003) - Elsie Tsa Che
- Dreamkeeper (2003) - Old Woman
- Into the West (2005) - Burnt by the Sun
- Distant Drumming (2005) - Elsie Tsa Che
- Elijah (2007) - Old Woman
- Mixed Blessings (2007-08) - Kookum
- Arctic Air (2014) - Auntie Belle
- Documentary Now! (2015) - Aglatki Qamaniq
- Fargo (2015) - Native American housekeeper

=== Film ===
- Gunslinger's Revenge (1998) - Native Grandmother
- The Last Rites of Ransom Pride (2010) - Old Woman
- Land (2018) - Mary Yellow Eagle
- Parallel Minds (2020) - Kookum
- Don't Say Its Name (2021) - Aggie
