= Jeff Barnaby =

Canadian Mi'kmaq filmmaker (1976–2022)

- Born: 1976; Listuguj, Quebec, Canada
- Died: 13 October 2022 (aged 46); Montreal, Quebec, Canada
- Occupations: Filmmaker, composer, writer
- Notable work: Rhymes for Young Ghouls; Blood Quantum
- Spouse: Sarah Del Seronde
- Children: 1

Jeff Barnaby (1976 – 13 October 2022) was a Mi'kmaq and Canadian film director, writer, composer, and film editor. He is known for his films Rhymes for Young Ghouls and Blood Quantum.

== Early life ==
Barnaby was born on a Mi'kmaq reserve in Listuguj, Quebec, in 1976. He graduated from both the Dawson College and Concordia University film programs.

== Career ==
Barnaby began his career directing short films. Barnaby's short film From Cherry English won two Golden Sheaf Awards: Best Aboriginal and Best Videography in the 2004 Yorkton Film Festival. His 2010 short film File Under Miscellaneous was nominated for a Genie Award for Best Live Action Short Drama.

Rhymes for Young Ghouls marked Barnaby's feature film debut. The film premiered in the Discovery section of the 2013 Toronto International Film Festival. It was given an independent release in Canada by its production company, Prospector Films in 2014. In July 2014, Monterey Media acquired the film for U.S. distribution. For his direction Barnaby was named Best Director of a Canadian Film by the Vancouver Film Critics Circle, best Actor (Glen Gould) and Director at the American Indian Film Festival (2014), and Best Performance by an Actress in a Leading Role (Devery Jacobs) at the Canadian Screen Awards (2014).

In 2015, Barnaby was invited by the National Film Board of Canada to participate in Souvenir, a collective made up of four First Nations filmmakers invited to use their archival material in order to create a short documentary. Barnaby's contribution was the short film Etlinisigu'niet (Bleed Down).

Barnaby premiered his sophomore feature Blood Quantum at the 2019 Toronto International Film Festival, as the opener for the festival's Midnight Madness section. The film was named the second runner-up for the festival's Grolsch People's Choice Midnight Madness Award. The film has been acquired for U.S. and international distribution on the Shudder streaming service, with Canadian streaming rights to be held by Crave.

At the 9th Canadian Screen Awards in 2021, Barnaby was nominated for Best Original Screenplay, and won the award for Best Editing, for Blood Quantum.

== Personal life ==
Barnaby was Mi'kmaq. He was married to Navajo filmmaker Sarah Del Seronde and had one son. Barnaby died in Montreal after a year of battling cancer on 13 October 2022.

Following his death, the imagineNATIVE Film and Media Arts Festival and Netflix launched the Jeff Barnaby Grant, a program to support new works by emerging indigenous filmmakers. He was also named as a posthumous recipient of the Board of Directors Tribute Award at the 12th Canadian Screen Awards in 2024.

== Filmography ==
- From Cherry English - 2004
- The Colony - 2007
- File Under Miscellaneous - 2010
- Rhymes for Young Ghouls - 2013
- Etlinisigu'niet (Bleed Down) - 2015
- Blood Quantum - 2019
