= Brandon Oakes =

Akwesasronon actor (born 1972)

Brandon A. Oakes (born July 3, 1972) is an Akwesasronon actor, artist, and dancer. He is a member of the Akwesasne Mohawk Nation.

== Career ==
Oakes is known for his role in the film Through Black Spruce, for which he was nominated for Best Actor at the 7th Canadian Screen Awards in 2019. He has also appeared in the films Rhymes for Young Ghouls, The Saver, Blood Quantum, Togo and Akilla's Escape, the television series Arctic Air, Saving Hope, Cardinal, Bad Blood, Diggstown, Anne with an E and Unsettled, as well as the web series Decoys.

== Filmography ==
=== Film ===
Year	TItle	Role	Notes
2007	Pathfinder	Elder #3	
2009	Taking Chances	Randy Crazyhorse	
2010	A Windigo Tale	Joey	
2011	A Warrior's Heart	Bureaucrat	
2013	Rhymes for Young Ghouls	Burner	
2014	The Jingle Dress	Rik	
2015	The Saver	Uncle Jack	
2018	Through Black Spruce	Will	
2019	Blood Quantum	Bumper	
2019	Cranks	Barry	
2019	Togo	Henry Ivanoff	
2020	Akilla's Escape	Zo	
2021	The Exchange	Neil Crowfoot	
2022	Rosie	Jigger	
2025	At the Place of Ghosts (Sk+te’kmujue’katik)		
2026	Jeffrey's Turn	Joe	

=== Television ===
Year	TItle	Role	Notes
2004	Wonderfalls	Native Chief	Episode: "Wax Lion"
2005	Into the West	Kicking Bear	Episode: "Ghost Dance"
2013	Arctic Air	Corp. Sahcho	3 episodes
2015	Blackstone	Tuk Tuk	Episode: "Flat Line"
2016	Houdini & Doyle	Walt	Episode: "The Pall of LaPier"
2017	Saving Hope	Eli King	Episode: "Gutted"
2018	Cardinal	Peter Crowchild	Episode: "Wombat"
2018	Bad Blood	Bobby Sunwind	6 episodes
2019	Anne with an E	Aluk	6 episodes
2019–2021	Diggstown	Doug Paul	17 episodes
2020	Decoys	Rhett Peltier	4 episodes
2020	Unsettled	Darryl Keetch	10 episodes
2021	Hudson & Rex	Barry Lysiak	Episode: "Under Pressure"
2021	FBI: Most Wanted	Chief Curotte	Episode: "The Line"
2022	Murdoch Mysteries	Uriah	Episode: "Rawhide Ralph"
2024–present	The Trades	Taser	
