= Take Us to Your Chief: and Other Stories =

Collection of short stories

First edition, cover artist: Andy Everson

Take Us to Your Chief: and Other Stories is a collection of nine short stories by Canadian author, playwright, and journalist Drew Hayden Taylor published in 2016 by Douglas & McIntyre. Taylor, who is part Caucasian, part Ojibwe, explains in the acknowledgments section of the book that the origin of the project lies in several failed attempts "to compile an anthology of Native sci-fi from Canada’s best First Nations writers." The stories explore contemporary First Nations social issues through employing a number of 1950s-era science fiction tropes and themes in these stories, including time travel, alien contact, and superpowers. Many reviews of the books have noted Taylor's use of humor to examine dark subject matter, such as the heritage of Canadian Indian residential schools, First Nations suicide rates, or the water quality crisis on Canadian reserves.

== The Stories ==
1. "Andrei nas"
2. "I Am...Am I"
3. "Lost in Space"
4. "Dreams of Doom"
5. "Mr. Gizmo"
6. "Petropaths"
7. "Stars"
8. "Superdisappointed"
9. "Take Us to Your Chief"

== Story summaries ==
=== Foreword ===
In his foreword, Taylor describes the genesis of Take Us to Your Chief: and Other Stories and invites readers into, in his term, a “new terra nullius.” He begins by describing his biracial upbringing and heritage. He points out that First Nations people are rarely associated with technology or science fiction, in part because Indigenous peoples were often at a technological disadvantage against European colonizers. He references the few examples that he can think of from popular culture, such as the Star Trek episode called “The Paradise Syndrome,” in which First Nations people are portrayed as stereotypical Indians in hippie clothing.

He also elaborates on his fascination with the world of sci-fi, which first started in comic books. He enjoyed the literary work of H.G. Wells, such as The Time Machine and The Invisible Man. Since sci-fi is a world of endless opportunities, he intends that these short stories help people explore science fiction through Native peoples’ minds, something that needs to be explored more thoroughly.

=== "A Culturally Inappropriate Armageddon" ===
“A Culturally Inappropriate Armageddon” is set on a Haudenosaunee reserve, towards the end of the Oka Crisis, with a handful of people that work at its first ever radio station, C-RES, which opens in 1991. Part 1, titled “C-Res Is on the Air,” depicts Emily, Aaron, and Tracey on their first days at the station. Within the group, there is a constant debate between broadcasting popular programming, including science fiction and film reviews, and culturally-relevant programming meant to aid in cultural revitalization efforts. One night, Aaron is late to work but once he shows up he can't stop talking about radio transmissions broadcasting into deep space, an event that has been occurring since the initial discovery of the radio waves by Heinrich Hertz. The story then skips ahead seven years to 1998, when Emily is struggling to find better content for her station until Tracey stumbles upon an old anthropological record named “The Calling Song” that they decide to broadcast to their audience. The story then jumps to the year 2018 where they are all huddled around a television watching a news station reporting that extraterrestrial life is heading towards them. The discussion of what is going to happen comes into the picture and they all decide it would either be like Contact or The Day the Earth Stood Still. A year later in 2019, the aliens have invaded the planet and destroyed everything. As the three former radio station employees suffer from radioactive fallout, they realize that the aliens received the broadcast of “The Calling Song” and took it as a message to come to Earth. They thus realize that the Haudenosaunee people were inadvertently responsible for the destruction of the Earth.

Part 2, titled “Old Men and Old Sayings,” tells us of an elderly man that is watching the news and listening to the radio about a spaceship coming to earth. He knows that he and everyone will die, but the people around him are excited. He finds a book on his night stand and flips to a page where he underlined a sentence a long time ago about the European colonization of the Americas. That sentence reads “those who cannot remember the past are condemned to repeat it” (23). He closes the book and Taylor concludes the story by writing, “he hated it when white people were right."

=== "I Am...Am I" ===
“I Am...Am I” chronicles the accidental creation and unexpected ending of artificial intelligence. Professor Mark King has a plethora of degrees and works for a research firm called FUTUREVISION. One night as Professor King searches the lab for his car keys—a common occurrence for him—he notices something unusual in the Matrix room. He reads on a computer the phrase “I am.” First believing it to be a prank, King later comes to the realization that his Matrix project has evolved into a responsive Artificial Intelligence. After this realization, Professor King calls his peer Dr. Gayle Chambers to further investigate this miraculous event.

After receiving approval from their superiors, Professor King and Dr. Chambers move forward in feeding the AI information, with Chambers serving as the lead communicator. With more information, it becomes increasingly concerned with its own existence and the concept of whether it has a soul. After several days of conversation with the AI, Chambers and King begin to feel uneasy about the AI's responses, which show signs of neuroses. Despite this behavior, Chambers decides to feed the AI information about the culture and history of the human race. Upon receiving this information, the AI becomes obsessed with Indigenous spirituality prior to the colonization of the Americas, and it requests more information on First Nations people. Dr. Chambers is hesitant at first, but gives in and continues to feed the AI the information with the intention to return to it in the morning. This leads to the AI finding out about colonization and genocide of Indigenous peoples. Upon her arrival the next day, Chambers discovers that the code for the AI has been completely wiped from the hard drive and a single message is left on the screen—"I was”—that signifies the AI's suicide.

=== "Lost in Space" ===
"Lost in Space" is told from the perspective of Mitchell, an Anishinabe astrosurveyor who is aboard a space shuttle on a two-year tour collecting rocks from an asteroid belt. He is accompanied by an Artificial general intelligence named Mac, short for “machine.” Mac is aboard this tour in order to accompany Mitchell and keep him sane; however, his company is a burden because for Mitchell, “true space exploration consists largely of boredom.” In the midst of Mitchell seeking a way to occupy his downtime, Mac interrupts with news about his grandfather, Papa Peter, dying. Papa Peter was Mitchell's only real tie to his Indigenous identity.

After receiving the news Mitchell begins to reminisce on all of the things Papa Peter had taught him throughout his life. He constantly posed questions concerning the world above (Father Sky) and how it is more important than the land they live on (Mother Earth), which eventually led Mitchell to the selection of his career. During his state of mourning, Mitchell begins to go through all the videos his grandfather had sent him throughout his space tours. Papa Peter had sent Mitchell videos from Otter Lake, a First Nations reserve; these videos are about controversial topics regarding being both native and an astronaut. In the midst of Mitchell's grieving, Mac tries to relieve the situation by finding an online video of Mitchell's grandfather participating in a drum ceremony at Ottawa’s National Aboriginal Day festival. He reconnects to his roots and his grandfather’s spirit as he listens to the Indigenous music by feeling the drum beat and humming along. Mac’s small act of kindness leads Mitchell to gain a new-found appreciation for his presence. Mitchell feels responsible to moving forward in his life in memory of Papa Peter.

=== "Dreams of Doom" ===
"Dreams of Doom" is narrated by an Ojibway reporter named Pamela Wanishin who works for an aboriginal newspaper called the West Wind. One day she receives a mysterious package with a broken dreamcatcher and a flash drive containing highly classified files. As she reads the files, she keeps seeing the term “Project Nightlight,” and out of curiosity, she Googles it. Once she Googles this, she is contacted by a nameless agent from Indigenous and Northern Affairs Canada and told that she must be relocated because the knowledge she now possesses must never be released to the public. She quickly flees the area to a cabin at Otter Lake, owned by a family member, to lie low for a few days.

Eventually, the government organization tracks her down using drones, which forces her to fight back and flee once again. Pamela then runs to her friend and coworker Sally's house for shelter. To Pamela's dismay, they have already brainwashed Sally before Pamela's arrival. The nameless agent then calls once more, but this time informs Pamela of the purpose of Project Nightlight: it is a sort of social conditioning experiment. He tells Pamela how they had created dreamcatchers as a way of pacifying Native people. This plan was implemented after the two real-life of Oka and Ipperwash crises and to minimize the efforts of the Idle No More movement. Having learned of this, she realizes how prevalent dreamcatchers are in her community. The story concludes with Pamela shutting down the call with the agent and using Sally's voice recorder to expose the government's conspiracy plan. Pamela then hooks up her message along with the files contained on the aforementioned flash drive to Sally's fail-safe connection to the West Wind. The plan is that when this connection loses power or is disconnected by the approaching agents, it will automatically disseminate all the information on Project Nightlight to the public.

=== "Mr. Gizmo" ===
“Mr. Gizmo” begins with a teenage boy on the day of his grandmother's funeral in a Canadian First Nations community located on Turtle Island. After the funeral, he steals his grandfather's .38 snub-nosed pistol and contemplates using it to commit suicide in his bedroom while the boy's widowed grandfather is passed out drunk in another room. Before cocking the gun, the boy takes in his situation and the lack of family surrounding him. He recalls his Aboriginal father's suspicious death in prison and his mother, who, like a large number of other indigenous women, went missing. He is interrupted by a voice coming from an inanimate object, his old toy robot named Mr. Gizmo. The formerly silent toy has been collecting dust on a shelf since his childhood and has since been long forgotten, which he mentions when they first begin talking.

The unnamed boy is initially reluctant to engage with the talking toy and questions the reality of the situation. Mr. Gizmo explains that he and all other inanimate objects consist of spirit incarnations that have been around for all of time, constantly observing Indigenous people. The toy tries to convince him not to commit suicide because it is not a good option to relieve his emotional pain. The omnipresent spirit of Mr. Gizmo humbles the boy by explaining to him that much worse has happened, and his problems, while valid, are nevertheless insignificant in comparison to colonization and the like. By reminding the boy of his identity as a Kwakwaka’wakw and the issue of destroying what could be generations of heritage, Mr. Gizmo makes him feel guilty and selfish for the potential repercussions of his suicide. The robot ultimately convinces the boy that things will get better for him. After this insightful conversation, the boy decides not to end his life and returns the gun before his grandfather notices it was taken.

=== "Petropaths" ===
“Petropaths” is the eulogy of Duane Crow written by his grandfather. Duane never graduated high school and has been in and out of jail for the past seven years since his mother died, so a sentencing circle sends him to Thunderbird Island, a fictional island on Otter Lake in Ontario, Canada that contains dozens of petroglyphs, in order to teach him the ways of their people. Duane's grandfather transports him to the island via boat and leaves him there, returning every Sunday to bring him food and cigarettes. During his three weeks on the island, Duane becomes interested in the petroglyphs and says he feels a humming coming from the rocks. The last Sunday Duane leaves the island with his grandfather but has with him an authentic looking Anishinaabe tomahawk he says he found on the island. His grandfather presses him on where specifically he found it but Duane says he doesn't know “yet.” A few days later his grandfather visits Duane at home where he lives with his Aunt Maggie, Duane's father's sister. Duane has been doing online research and tells his grandfather that Stonehenge, the Nazca Lines, the Cochno Stone, Machu Picchu, and Judaculla Rock all form a sacred geometric pattern across the globe. His grandfather warns him about conspiracy theories but Duane says there's a pattern to these sites and the petroglyphs on Thunderbird Island are part of it.

The next morning, his grandfather goes to the petroglyphs on Thunderbird Island to see what Duane's talking about and there he finds Aunt Maggie's boat and two new rock carvings but no Duane, so he returns home. That evening, Duane arrives at his grandfather's home but looks like he's been lost in the wilderness for a week. His grandfather plans to scold him for his vandalism of a sacred site but Duane shows him a flintlock pistol he claims he stole from a coureur des bois. Duane says he's cracked the code of the petroglyphs and is able to travel through time by carving new petroglyphs into the rock. His grandfather is skeptical, so a week later Duane's grandfather travels to Thunderbird Island to investigate the petroglyphs where he finds Duane lying on the ground, dying of smallpox. His grandfather says to the funeral crowd he doesn't know if Duane was telling the truth but he knows that Duane is the first North American to die of the diseases since the 1930s so it is possible he really did travel through time.

=== "Stars" ===
"Stars" depicts the stories of three different characters, each at different points in time. Though different, each boy is fascinated by and identifies with the stars and uses them as an escape from their father issues. The first part introduces the reader to Nimki, a fourteen-year-old Indigenous boy from an unknown tribe on Turtle Island well before European colonization. He is one of the best trackers in his village, even better than his father, which causes friction within the family, though his poor eyesight keeps him from being a successful hunter. Though Nimki contemplates his tribe's way of life, he cannot keep his mind away from the stars above him. Unaware of what they are, he believes that if he wishes or thinks hard enough, he hopes he may float up and disappear among them. He wonders if those among their own campfires might be looking down on his own. The second part of the story describes a scene in which Walter, a Native boy living on a reservation, is leaving his house after yet another scolding from his alcoholic father. Walter is studying astronomy in his science class, which he enjoys, as it provides a distraction from his home life. His last class discussed Kepler-186f, a possible habitable planet about 490 light-years away from Earth in the Cygnus constellation. Walter wonders if there are other boys like him out in space.

The last part of the story is set on Kepler-186f, where the reader becomes acquainted with Eric. Unable to sleep, he decides to walk the compounds of Plymroc, their twenty-two-year-old settlement, named for its symbolism of Earth's Plymouth Rock. His father never notices Eric's absences as he is always too busy contributing his work to maintain the settlement's survival and progress. Eric finds himself in a room where he manipulates code to show him his desired view: Earth. The earth Eric is staring at is 490 years behind the Earth's present day, around the time Columbus started sailing the New World. Eric looks at Earth and wonders if somewhere there was a young man, like him, looking up to the sky. The stars in the night sky bring the three stories together by giving each boy hope that someone out there is wondering about him and holding the same astronomical curiosities.

=== "Superdisappointed" ===
“Superdisappointed” explores the challenges of being the first Ojibwe superhero. Initially, protagonist Kyle Muncy is excited when he spontaneously develops superpowers, attempting to change the world for the better. But six months later, his life is irrevocably worse. As Kyle “can only come out of so many closets at once,” and is unwilling to both come “out of the superhero closet” and announce his homosexuality to the world, his relationship with his boyfriend Raymond is destroyed. He is burdened by lawsuits, from banks that have been damaged during foiled robberies to sports teams contesting his use of the name Thunderbird, a symbol appropriated from First Nations culture. (To the Ojibwe, whose five clans are each represented by animals, the Thunderbird would have represented a sixth clan, but the great being meant to found it was so powerful that it killed its people instead.) All of this leaves Kyle depressed and isolated.

Kyle's white doctor reluctantly reveals that the causes of Kyle's superpowers are most likely due to his poisonous living conditions, common to First Nation reserves: unclean water on the reserve, radon gas, and toxic mould. Kyle posits that his abilities are really the symptoms of a polluted and exploited “Earth fighting back...the first casualty of a war to come.” The story ends with the defeated Kyle adrift in slumber, social and environmental injustice continuing unabated, with no one to stop them. As his doctor muses, “If you have all the money in the world but no place to spend it, is there a point?”

=== "Take Us to Your Chief" ===
Three old Ojibwe friends, Teddy, Tarzan, and Cheemo (meaning “big shit”) have spent so much time together that they are able to communicate without speaking. The trio are drinking beer at Otter Lake Reserve, when a spacecraft with mysterious dimensions and blinking lights descends from the sky. An ambiguously shaped extraterrestrial emerges from the ship. Its body temperature runs hot, it leaves a trail of slime as it moves, and it smells of methane, presumably because of a methane-heavy atmosphere on its home planet. The alien identifies itself as a member of the Kaaw Wiyaa and asks to communicate with the trio's leader. Knowing nobody in a higher position of power, the trio introduce the Kaaw Wiyaa to the Chief of the Otter Lake First Nation. Using diplomatic tactics he learned from his experience at an Assembly of First Nations, Chief Angus attempts to negotiate with the aliens. The situation reminds him of the Beothuk and Mi’kmaq experiences during the first contact with Europeans hundreds of years before.

To begin negotiations, the Kaaw Wiyaa offer to build monuments reminiscent of ancient world wonders, suggesting that structures such as the pyramids or Stonehenge had also been constructed by aliens. Instead, the Chief wishes the aliens could clean the reserve's drinking water but, assuming they could not navigate the governmental restrictions, settles on relieving the reservation of the trio by sending them to the Kaaw Wiyaa's planet as diplomats. The story ends as the trio hitch a ride to the Kaaw Wiyaa's planet in the spaceship's impossibly large cabin. The aliens compliment the humans on their ability to meta-communicate, citing this neurological advancement as the reason they approached Earth. The trio begin to regret their decision, until the extraterrestrials offer them a curious drink they claim will have similar effects to beer. The trio sit back and enjoy the drink as the aliens recreate the look, sound, and smell of Old Man's Point. Finally, Cheemo utters the only line of spoken dialogue by the three men when he observes, “We should have done this years ago.”

== Themes ==
Take Us to Your Chief draws on a variety of classic fiction tropes and themes to comment on contemporary life among Indigenous peoples in Canada. These tropes include political conspiracies; the first contact between societies and peoples; alien invasion; time and space travel; superhuman powers and abilities; and anthropomorphism. In general, the stories draw parallels to science fiction and world history, such as alien contact paralleling the first contact and later colonization by Europeans of the Americas.

In addition to the science fiction tropes, these stories also examine social issues faced by Indigenous peoples. These include the rediscovery of cultural heritage; the geographic and social isolation of aboriginal people on reserves; suicide rates, especially among Native youth; depression; housing and water crises; environmental destruction; the violence of cultural assimilation; the heritage of the residential school system; and alcoholism.

== Reception ==
It is the general consensus that Take Us to Your Chief is a successful cross-genre collection that blends First Nations and science-fiction literature. The majority of critical responses agree that while the science fiction aspect of the stories is entertaining and arouses the readers’ imagination, the character-driven plots are meaningful contributions about the First Nations people and their struggles. Alex Good from The Star deems the book an entertaining collection of "mash-ups" whose "tone is mostly comic, playing off of incongruities." Robert J. Wiersema states in his review that “Taylor’s ability to inject humour into even a post-apocalyptic setting is admirable,” and he notes the contrast between humor with the dark messages of the stories allows readers to appreciate the messages and get through the collection without being turned away, although some of the stories do "lack subtlety."

Some reviewers of this compilation have criticized its clichéd use of Golden Age science fiction tropes as well as its use of humor. Publishers Weekly states that “the collection is probably too retro to appeal to serious fans of speculative fiction." In Ira Nayman's review published in Amazing Stories magazine, he writes about how “the tropes are well worn at this point in science fiction’s evolution,” though he notes that Taylor reinvigorates these tropes and that the chief strength of the collection is to make non-Native readers uncomfortable. Tor.com’s Aidan Moher believes that “what Take Us to Your Chief lacks in originality, it makes up for in perspective.” Nora Dector from the Malahat Review argues that “science fiction, even when it is playing out the end of the world, is still intended to entertain, and Taylor leads with that, letting the seriousness of his themes arise unexpectedly.”

=== Awards and nominations ===
- Stephen Leacock Memorial Medal for Humor (2017, nominated)
