= Peter Kelly Gaudreault =

Canadian actor and writer

Peter Kelly Gaudreault is a Canadian actor and writer, most noted for his regular role as RCMP officer James Harper in the television series North of 60. He received a Gemini Award nomination for Best Lead Actor in a Dramatic Program or Miniseries at the 14th Gemini Awards in 1999, for the North of 60 spinoff film In the Blue Ground.

He later had a regular role as Ollie Frenette in the television series Rabbit Fall.

In 2009 he published the children's book With a Hug and a Listen, a story based on his own young son's first day at school.
