= The Colony (2007 film) =

- Directed by: Jeff Barnaby
- Written by: Jeff Barnaby
- Produced by: John Christou
- Starring: Glen Gould; Kaniehtiio Horn
- Cinematography: Michel St-Martin
- Edited by: Jeff Barnaby
- Music by: Jeff Barnaby
- Production company: EyeSteelFilm
- Release date: September 11, 2007 (TIFF)
- Running time: 24 minutes
- Country: Canada
- Languages: English; Mi'kmaq

The Colony is a 2007 Canadian short film, written, directed, edited, and composed by Jeff Barnaby. The film stars Glen Gould as Maytag, a Mi'kmaq man dealing with the emotional fallout of a love triangle, when his girlfriend Myriam (Kaniehtiio Horn) runs off with his friend and drug dealer Jackson (Kent McQuaid).

The film premiered at the 2007 Toronto International Film Festival. It was named to TIFF's annual year-end Canada's Top Ten list for 2007, and was a finalist for Best Aboriginal Film at the 2008 Yorkton Film Festival. It was a shortlisted Jutra Award nominee for Best Short Film at the 10th Jutra Awards in 2008.
