= Tinsel Korey =

Canadian actress and singer-songwriter

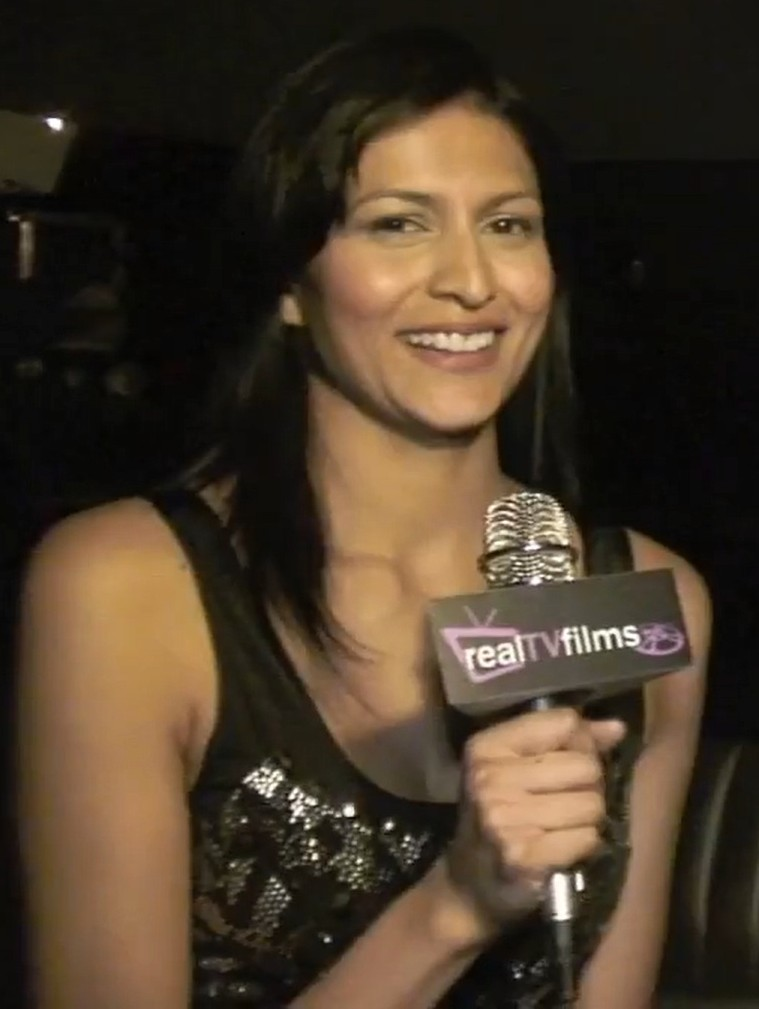
- Korey in 2010
- Born: March 25, 1980 (age 46); Toronto, Ontario, Canada
- Occupations: Actress; Singer-songwriter
- Years active: 2003–present
- Website: tinselkorey.com

Tinsel Korey (born March 25, 1980) is a Canadian actress and singer-songwriter. She is best known for portraying Emily Young in The Twilight Saga film series.

Scholars have written that she falsely adopted a Native American identity.

== Life and career ==
Prior to her move to Vancouver, Korey had already found work through her multiple appearances in commercial advertisements. She then decided in late 2002 to move to Hollywood, but was "stopped at the border because she couldn't prove she was going to come back to Canada. She couldn't go home though so she called her friend and got on a flight to Vancouver and she's been there ever since."

In 2006, Korey was given a small role as a rape victim opposite Callum Keith Rennie in the film Unnatural & Accidental, which told the story of a series of murders of mostly First Nations women. The film's director, Carl Bessai, recalled: "It was one of her first gigs and it was harrowing. She was terrified and Callum is so method, so intense. It was one of those moments where you watch a young actor and you think, 'This will either really give them the power to act or it will just alienate them.'"

=== Career under Native American identity ===
Korey performed as a singer at the 2008 National Aboriginal Achievement Awards. Academic Natalie Wilson wrote that Korey is East Indian, and had claimed to be Native American when cast to play Emily Young in The Twilight Saga: New Moon.

In 2015, Korey was cast in an episode of Z Nation where the protagonists meet a group of Native Americans. Her casting was criticized by Native American viewers. Scholar Léna Remy-Kovach writes that Korey is an Indo-Canadian actress who changed her name to conceal her identity, and adjusted her appearance to pass as Native American. She compares her to the Italian-American actor Iron Eyes Cody, saying Korey was accused of taking roles from Native American actors.

== Filmography ==
=== Film ===
Year	Title	Role	Notes
2005	It Waits	Lark Rainwater	
2006	Divided by Zero	Ashley	Short
2006	Unnatural & Accidental	Blue Girl	
2007	The Lookout	Maura	
2007	Luna: Spirit of the Whale	Annie	TV movie
2007	I Know What I Saw	Alicia	TV movie
2007	Hybrid	Lydia	TV movie
2008	The Quality of Life	Anna Navarez	TV movie
2008	Mothers & Daughters	Cynthia	
2009	Wyvern	Vinyl Hampton	TV movie
2009	The Twilight Saga: New Moon	Emily Young	
2010	The Twilight Saga: Eclipse	Emily Young	
2010	Stained	Isabelle Clarke	
2011	The Twilight Saga: Breaking Dawn – Part 1	Emily Young	
2012	Black Box	Kate	
2012	Black Forest	Karin	TV movie
2014	Bullet	Vanessa	
2015	Fishing Naked	Jen	
2015	The Native and the Shrink	Rachel	Short
2015	Single in South Beach	Sandra	
2016	Guns of Purgatory	S.S. Abbey	Short
2018	SuperGrid	Eagle	

=== Television ===
Year	Title	Role	Notes
2004	Tru Calling	Jen	Episode: "Murder in the Morgue"
2004	Da Vinci's Inquest	Sheila	Episode: "A Man When He's Down"
2005	Into the West	Bluebird	Recurring Cast
2006	Godiva's	Chantal	Recurring Cast: Season 2
2007	Tin Man	Airofday	Recurring Cast
2007	Intelligence	Felicia	Recurring Cast: Season 2
2008	Rabbit Fall	Zoe	Main Cast: Season 2
2008	The Guard	Martine	Recurring Cast: Season 1-2
2011	Sanctuary	Sioux	Episode: "One Night"
2013	Blackstone	Roberta	Recurring Cast: Season 3
2014	Killer Women	Diane	Episode: "Demons"
2015-18	Z Nation	Ayalla	Guest Cast: Season 2 & 5
2016	Longmire	Tina	Episode: "The Stuff Dreams Are Made Of"
2016	The Young and the Restless	Evan	Episode: "Episode #1.11036"
2018	The Detour	Megwyn	Recurring Cast: Season 2
2018-19	Yellowstone	Emily Sessions	Guest Cast: Season 1-2
2020	Curious George	Kimi (voice)	Episode: "Episode #12.1"
2021	Shaman King	Lilirara (voice)	Episode: "And Hao!"
