= Unsettled (TV series) =

Canadian TV drama

- Genre: Drama
- Created by: Jennifer Podemski; Derek Diorio
- Written by: Jennifer Podemski; Derek Diorio
- Starring: Cheri Maracle; Tamara Podemski; Pamela Matthews; Wesley French; Lawrence Bayne; Albert Owl; Mitchell Loon; Joshua Odjick; Michaella Shannon; Brandon Oakes
- Country of origin: Canada
- Original languages: English; Ojibwe
- No. of seasons: 1
- No. of episodes: 10

Production
- Producer: Geoff Ewart
- Camera setup: Single-camera

Original release
- Network: APTN; TVO

Unsettled is a 2021 Canadian drama television series that originally aired on the Aboriginal Peoples Television Network and TVO.

Cheri Maracle stars as an Indigenous woman who was removed from her family as a child, during the Sixties Scoop, and is now attempting to reconnect to her heritage and her birth parents. A visit to her First Nation reserve in Northern Ontario becomes a more permanent stay when the business run by her husband (Brandon Oakes) fails, leaving their family destitute, and forcing them to relocate from Toronto to the reserve. The cast also includes Tamara Podemski, and Joshua Odjick, Glen Gould, and Sid Bobb appear in recurring roles.

The series was created by Jennifer Podemski and Derek Diorio, and shot on Nipissing First Nation. Twenty percent of the dialogue is in Ojibwe, and a version of the series dubbed into that language completely was produced as well.
