= The Night Wanderer =

Book by Drew Hayden Taylor

The Night Wanderer: A Native Gothic Novel
- Author: Drew Hayden Taylor
- Language: English
- Genre: Canadian literature, First Nations, Young adult
- Publisher: Annick Press
- Publication date: 2007
- Publication place: Canada
- Media type: Print (Softcover)
- Pages: 195-205 p

The Night Wanderer: A Native Gothic Novel is a novel by Canadian author Drew Hayden Taylor published by Annick Press in 2007. The work is a novelization of Taylor's 1992 play A Contemporary Gothic Indian Vampire Story.

== Plot ==
Sixteen-year-old Anishinaabe teen Tiffany Hunter struggles to adjust after her mother, Claudia, abandons the family to go live with a white man. The one bright spot in Tiffany's life is her recent relationship with Tony. Tiffany and Tony's relationship is made difficult by the fact that he is white and lives in the wealthier suburb of Baymeadow while she and the majority of her friends live on Otter Lake, a poor reserve. He also begins to use her status card in order to not pay sales tax. Tiffany's friends warn her that he may be using her for her card, but Tiffany is reassured when she asks him to stop asking her to use it and he does.

Meanwhile, her father Keith, who has been struggling financially since the departure of his wife, decides to try to rent out a room in the Hunter home. It is taken almost immediately by a man who calls himself Pierre L’Errant and who claims to be from Europe and keeps strange habits, insisting on staying in the basement room where there are no windows and sleeping all day. Pierre is Anishinaabe and lived in a village in the same location as Otter Lake hundreds of years ago, but tells Keith that he has two great-grandparents who immigrated to Europe during World War I in order to stave off questions. Finally back in the land of his birth, Pierre reflects back on his childhood as a boy named Owl who ran away with French fur traders to France. Once there he was brought to live with the French king as a member of his court. After contracting measles he was on the verge of death when he a man came through his window and exchanged blood with him turning him into a vampire.

After being told that a friend of Tony's is wearing a bracelet matching Tiffany's that Tony claimed he bought for his mother, Tiffany confronts her boyfriend. He breaks up with her claiming that the pressure put on him by his racist parents and friends is too much. A distraught Tiffany calls her mother in Edmonton and asks to live with her. She discovers that her mother is pregnant and cuts off contact with her.

The following morning, after a fight with her father, Tiffany runs off into the woods muttering vague threats that sound like she is suicidal. She then disappears to an abandoned treehouse in the woods. Her family, unaware of where she is, panic. That night Pierre is able to track her down. After a brief altercation he follows her to a lake where his former village once was. Pierre digs up several arrowheads for Tiffany and explains that a village must have been located in the area. He later tells her the story of his life as a vampire pretending it is a story his great-grandfather once told him. When Tiffany asks him what became of the vampire, Pierre reveals that he returned to his homeland in order to take his own life, revealing his own plans. Entranced by his story, Tiffany decides that she wants to live and Pierre helps her return home. After he is assured that Tiffany is safe, Pierre returns to the spot where they conversed in order to meet the rising sun, and his death.

== Adaptations ==
In 2013 Annick Press published The Night Wanderer: A Graphic Novel. The novel was adapted by Alison Kooistra with artwork by Michael Wyatt.
