= Gerry Bean =

Canadian actor

Gerald William Bean is a Canadian former actor who had television and film roles under the names Gerry Bean and John Oliver.

== Career ==
Bean is best known for his role as Royal Canadian Mounted Police officer Eric Olssen in the first two seasons of North of 60, for which he received a Gemini Award nomination for Best Actor in a Continuing Leading Dramatic Role at the 8th Gemini Awards in 1994.

In 1994, Bean was charged with assault after an off-set altercation with Tina Keeper, his North of 60 costar and former common-law wife. A few months later he was dropped from the series, although the producers denied that the decision was related to the assault case. Keeper later withdrew the assault charge.

Bean also had guest roles in 21 Jump Street, The Beachcombers, Danger Bay, Broken Badges, Bordertown and MacGyver as Gerry Bean, and The Mighty Ducks, Murder, She Wrote and The X-Files as John Oliver.

== Filmography ==
=== Film ===
Year	Title	Role	Notes
1989	Cousins	Wedding Guest	Uncredited
1989	Look Who's Talking	Pilot Friend	
1989	We're No Angels	Guard	
1991	Run	Cop at Karen's	
1991	The Hitman	Fierro	
1992	The Mighty Ducks	Cardinals Goal	
1996	Fear	Eddie Clark	

=== Television ===
Year	Title	Role	Notes
1987–1989	21 Jump Street	Various roles	3 episodes
1989	Danger Bay	Bosun	Episode: "Before the Mast"
1989	The Beachcombers	Phil	Episode: "Hot Stuff"
1989–1991	MacGyver	Various roles	4 episodes
1990	Bordertown	Darcy O'Shea	Episode: "The Last Fenian Raid"
1990	Broken Badges	Gordon Bacus	Episode: "Pilot"
1991	Omen IV: The Awakening	Bartender-New England	Television film
1992	The Comrades of Summer	Hamill	Television film
1992–1994	North of 60	Eric Olsen	32 episodes
1993	Miracle on Interstate 880	Jim Mendonsa	Television film
1996	Murder, She Wrote	Mike Holbert	Episode: "The Dark Side of the Door"
1997	The Perfect Mother	Jesse J.	Television film
1997	The X-Files	Rolston	Episode: "Gethsemane"
1997	The Sentinel	Trent Leeds	Episode: "Vendetta"
