= Brett Sorensen =

American canoeist

Medal record

Men's canoe slalom

Representing United States

World Championships
Bronze medal – third place	1981 Bala	Mixed C-2

Brett Sorensen is a former American slalom canoeist who competed in the early 1980s. He won a bronze medal in the mixed C-2 event at the 1981 ICF Canoe Slalom World Championships in Bala, Gwynedd, Wales.
