= Cashing In =

Canadian TV dramedy series

- Starring: Eric Schweig; Karen Holness; Glen Gould; Wesley French
- Country of origin: Canada
- No. of seasons: 4
- No. of episodes: 26

Production
- Executive producers: Norma Bailey; Phyllis Laing; Peter Strutt
- Producers: Tina Keeper; Ron E. Scott; Vanessa Loewen; Desirée Single; Jean du Toit
- Production locations: Winnipeg, Manitoba
- Running time: 30 minutes
- Production company: Buffalo Gal Pictures

Original release
- Network: APTN
- Release: 2009 – 2014

Cashing In is a Canadian television comedy-drama series, which aired on APTN from 2009 to 2014. Set in the fictional First Nations community of Stonewalker, the series revolved around the staff and customers of an indigenous-owned casino.

The show starred Eric Schweig as casino owner Matthew Tommy, Karen Holness as his assistant Liz McKendra, Glen Gould as property magnate John Eagle, and Wesley French as Matthew's son Justin. Supporting cast members included Nancy Sorel, Sarah Podemski, Kyle Nobess, Tina Keeper and Stephen Eric McIntyre.

The series was produced by Buffalo Gal Pictures.
