= File Under Miscellaneous =

- Directed by: Jeff Barnaby
- Written by: Jeff Barnaby
- Produced by: John Christou
- Starring: Glen Gould; John Christou; Arthur Holden
- Cinematography: Michel St-Martin
- Edited by: Jeff Barnaby
- Music by: Jeff Barnaby; Joe Barrucco
- Production company: Prospector Films
- Release date: September 10, 2010 (TIFF)
- Running time: 8 minutes
- Country: Canada
- Languages: English; Mi'kmaq

File Under Miscellaneous is a 2010 Canadian short film, written, directed, edited, and composed by Jeff Barnaby. A dystopian science fiction film, it stars Glen Gould as a Mi'kmaq man who is tired of being victimized by anti-First Nations racism, and undergoes invasive surgery to become white.

The film premiered at the 2010 Toronto International Film Festival, and received a Genie Award nomination for Best Live Action Short Drama at the 31st Genie Awards.
