= The Sky Has Fallen =

- Directed by: Doug Roos
- Written by: Doug Roos
- Produced by: Doug Roos
- Starring: Carey MacLaren; Laurel Kemper; Cory Knisely; Nathan Shelton
- Cinematography: Doug Roos
- Edited by: Doug Roos
- Music by: James Sizemore
- Production company: Lost Forever Productions
- Release date: May 7, 2009
- Country: United States
- Language: English
- Budget: $20,000

The Sky Has Fallen is a 2009 American horror film, written and directed by Doug Roos. It stars Carey MacLaren and Laurel Kemper as two survivors of a gruesome apocalypse.

== Plot ==
An Ebola-like plague decimates the world's population. Attempting to escape infection, people flee to rural locations but strange demonic figures appear, transforming the dead into their army. The two main characters, Lance and Rachel, try to hunt down the leader of these creatures before humanity gets wiped out.

== Cast ==
- Carey MacLaren as Lance
- Laurel Kemper as Rachel
- Cory Knisely as The Leader
- Nathan Shelton as Chilton

== Production ==
The film was shot in Missouri with a wide range of influences, including Versus and The Exorcist. The opening shots of a large city were actually done in Tokyo, Japan. The film is known for containing all practical effects, without any computer-generated imagery (CGI).

== Release ==
The original cut of The Sky Has Fallen premiered at the British Film Festival Los Angeles. It was independently distributed on DVD on February 16, 2010. New footage was shot in 2011 and again in 2014, resulting in three very different versions of the film with the latest being an 80-minute Ultimate Edition that came out in June 2015.

== Reception ==
Matt Boiselle of Dread Central rated it a 4/5, calling the film "a very large win for independent cinema in my opinion and isn’t a film that should be passed by." HorrorNews.net gave it "7 zombies" out of 10, writing there is "some really creative stuff going on in this film." Bella Blitz of The Horror Honeys was "pleasantly surprised" with a score of 3 out of 5, adding, "Seriously though, so much blood. It was awesome." Richard Martin at UK Horror Scene described it as a "character driven, unique and well shot piece of work no doubt" with "practical effects to rival that of AAA Hollywood titles." Roger DeMarco of Repulsive Reviews called it "one of the gnarliest films I have seen in recent history," adding that it was "on par with Raimi’s The Evil Dead." Mark Miller of Ain't It Cool News wrote that it was "genuinely creepy and downright scary." Brian Kirst of Horror Society said it was "a visual marvel" that "creates both a sympathetic point of view and a world of oozing horror as well." Bella Blitz of The Horror Honeys pointed out that the film has "elements of revenge, monsters, slasher, and splatter genres combined."

=== Awards ===
Festival awards
Festival	Award
Global Independent Film Awards	Best Horror Feature
Freak Show Horror Film Festival	Best Feature
Indie Gathering Film Festival	Best Horror Feature
Accolade Global Film Competition	Award of Merit for Cinematography and Feature Film
