= Ketsia =

Haitian-Canadian singer and songwriter

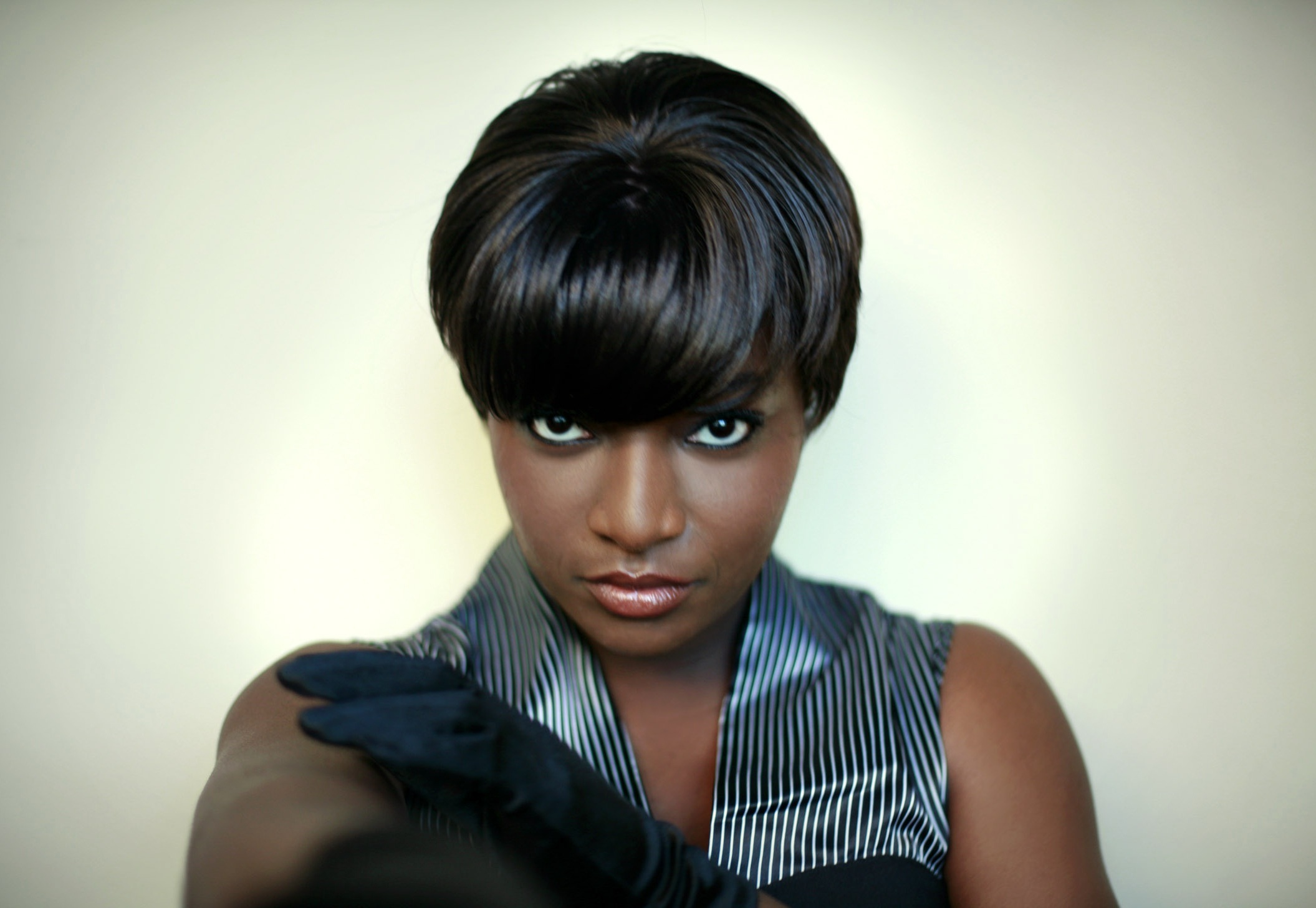
- Ketsia in 2009

Background information
- Born: Montreal, Quebec, Canada
- Genres: Pop
- Occupation: Singer-songwriter
- Years active: 2010s–present
- Label: K-Train Entertainment

Ketsia is a Haitian-Canadian singer and songwriter, born in Montreal, Quebec. An indie artist, she sings in French and English, and is a co-founder of the Canadian record label K-Train Entertainment.

== Career ==
Ketsia has three songs that charted on Billboard, spending a total of 15 weeks on the charts. "Possible" was the first song to hit the charts in June 2010, then came "Just Let Me Go" in March 2011, and the last song to appear on a chart was "Running on Empty" in June 2011. "Possible" charted for four weeks and peaked at No. 83 on the Billboard Hot 100 chart and No. 9 on Billboard's "Emerging Canadian Artists" chart. "Just Let Me Go" charted for seven weeks and peaked at No. 49 on the Hot 100 chart and No. 4 on the "Emerging Canadian Artists" chart. "Running on Empty" peaked at No. 45 on the Hot 100 chart, No. 4 on the "Emerging Canadian Artists" chart, and No. 18 on Billboard's "Hot Digital Songs" chart (June 2011). Ketsia was on the centerfold of ME Magazine's summer 2010 issue as part of its "Rising Star" series. Using sales data from Nielsen SoundScan, the Quebec Government ranked Ketsia as having the 15th most sold Québécois digital track in 2010, for her song "Possible".
