= North of 60 =

Canadian television series

- North of 60
- Created by: Barbara Samuels; Wayne Grigsby
- Starring: Tina Keeper; Tracey Cook; Tom Jackson; Robert Bockstael; Gordon Tootoosis; Jimmy Herman; Timothy Webber
- Country of origin: Canada
- No. of seasons: 6
- No. of episodes: 90 plus 5 made for TV movies between 1999 and 2005

Production
- Running time: 45 minutes per episode
- Production company: Alberta Filmworks

Original release
- Network: CBC Television
- Release: 3 December 1992 – 18 December 1997

North of 60 is a Canadian television drama depicting life in the sub-Arctic northern boreal forest (north of 60° north latitude, hence the title). It first aired on CBC Television in 1992 and was syndicated around the world. It is set in the fictional community of Lynx River, a Canadian Indigenous community depicted as being in the Dehcho Region, Northwest Territories.

Most of the characters were Dene. Some non-native characters had important roles: the restaurant/motel owner (a Ukrainian immigrant), the band manager, the nurse (a white Canadian woman) and (during the show's first season) the town's RCMP Detachment Commander. The show explored themes of Native poverty, alcoholism, cultural preservation, conflict over land settlements, and natural resource exploitation.

Originally somewhat light-hearted (a CBC response to the very successful Northern Exposure on CBS), it quickly became a more sombre dramatic series which explored subplots including murder, band corruption, economic depression, mental health and the death of a child (owing to actress Selina Hanuse, who played Hannah Kenidi, leaving the show to pursue her education in Season 3). There were also romantic and sexual subplots between unlikely characters, giving the show a distinctive soap opera-like atmosphere not hugely common in Canadian government-sponsored media at the time. This included scenes depicting brief sex, nudity and profanity, as well as discussion in one episode about HIV/AIDS and the social stigma faced by a young boy who was a male prostitute with the disease.

== Casting ==
Starring in the series were Tina Keeper as RCMP Constable, later Corporal, Michelle Kenidi, Tracey Cook as Sarah Birkett (nurse during first year), Tom Jackson as Peter Kenidi (band chief in first year, Michelle's brother), Gordon Tootoosis as Albert Golo (bootlegger, then band chief), Dakota House as Trevor 'Teevee' Tenia (teen trouble-maker, then band chief), Lubomir Mykytiuk as Gerry Kisilenko (restaurant/motel owner/justice of the peace), Timothy Webber as Harris Miller (band manager), Jimmy Herman as Joe Gomba (elder) and Simon R. Baker as Charlie Muskrat. Adam Beach and Tantoo Cardinal also starred. Elsie Tsa Che (Wilma Pelly) was a fan favorite, playing Teevee's grandmother, a community elder. John Oliver led the cast as Corporal Eric Olsen during the show's first two seasons and entered into an off-screen relationship with co-star Keeper; he left the show when his relationship with Keeper soured. Keeper subsequently became the show's lead actor for the remainder of its run. Oliver was replaced by Robert Bockstael as Corporal Brian Fletcher, who was replaced later by Peter Kelly Gaudreault as Constable James Harper.

One of the stars was Michael Horse, as Andrew One Sky, previously best known for his portrayal of Deputy Hawk in Twin Peaks and as Tonto in the 1981 film The Legend of the Lone Ranger. Tom Jackson also performed as Billy Twofeathers on Shining Time Station and was also a well-known singer and philanthropist in Canada.

=== List of characters ===
Character	Actor	Seasons	Summary
Michelle Kenidi	Tina Keeper	1–6	RCMP officer, sister of Peter Kenidi band chief.
Eric Olsen	John Oliver	1–2	RCMP officer, who transfers to Lynx River after losing his partner.
Lindy Olsen	Barbara Tyson	1–3	Eric's estranged, somewhat neurotic wife who later divorces him but returns to Lynx River after Eric's death in Season 3.
Lisa Olsen	Adrienne Carter	1–2	Eric's asthmatic daughter, who lives with Lindy most of the time.
Andy Olsen	Robbie Bowen	1–2	Eric's spoiled, bitter teenage son who resents his parents for the divorce. Eric is later disturbed in Season 2 after learning that Lindy's new live-in boyfriend, Bill, has been teaching Andy racism and derogatory remarks about Indigenous people, such as that they smell bad and carry lice. This leads to Hannah ending her friendship with Andy's little sister, Lisa.
Sarah Birkett	Tracey Cook	1–6	Nurse and treatment center therapist.
Peter Kenidi	Tom Jackson	1–6	Brother of RCMP officer Michele and band chief; has a son with his wife Ellen.
Albert Golo	Gordon Tootoosis	1–6	Bootlegger and former band chief.
Brian Fletcher	Robert Bockstael	3–5	RCMP officer, who replaces Eric Olsen.
Trevor 'Teevee' Tenia	Dakota House	1–6	Town trouble maker who becomes a portable sawmill operator, then band chief. He has a daughter with his girlfriend Bertha.
Bertha Kizha	Lori Lea Okemow	1-6	Teevee's girlfriend and later the mother of his two children.
Lois Tenia	Willene Tootoosis	1-6	Teevee's mother and daughter of Elsie Tsa Che.
Gerry Kisilenko	Lubomir Mykytiuk	1-6	A Ukrainian-Canadian resident, store and motel owner known for being somewhat unscrupulous but a good person.
Elsie Tsa Che	Wilma Pelly	1-6	Elder and medicine woman, also raised her granddaughter, Marie Tenia, and grandson, Teevee, to whom she often provides guidance. Her daughter Lois Tenia also lives with her.
Harris Miller	Timothy Webber	1-6	One of the few non-First Nations residents of Lynx River; band manager and works closely with Peter Kenedi. He later marries Lois Tenia, during which it is revealed that he is from Gagetown, New Brunswick.
Rosie Deela	Tina Louise Bomberry	1-6	Married to Leon with three kids, has a history of severe alcoholism. Works as a waitress/clerk in Gerry's store and restaurant.
Leon Deela	Erroll Kinistino	1-6	Rosie's husband and an expert construction worker, with a history of severe alcoholism.
Ellen Kenidi	Renae Morriseau	1-5	Peter's wife and a social worker.
Betty Moses	Tantoo Cardinal	3-6	An abrasive and loud but kind-hearted woman who runs treatment programs for Indigenous Canadians struggling with addictions. Betty herself struggles with mental health and addictions in Season 6, but is aided by Michelle.
Joe Gomba	Jimmy Herman	1-6	An expert tracker and hunter.
Hannah Kenidi	Selina Hanuse	1–4	Michelle's daughter, who moves to Calgary in Season 3.
Nathan Golo	Michael P. Obey	1–6	Albert's smartest son.
Joey Small Boat	Mervin Good Eagle	1–5	A Lynx River teenager (Joey stopped appearing in Season 6 due to the sudden death of Mervin Good Eagle).
William MacNeil	Nathaniel Arcand	3–6	A young man from outside of Lynx River who's usually looking for trouble.
Rosemary Fletcher	Julie Stewart	4–5	Brian Fletcher's wife.
Andrew One Sky	Michael Horse	4–6	A psychologist who befriends Michelle after a tragic incident.
Charlie Muskrat	Simon R. Baker	4–6	A young boy whom Michelle Kenidi takes into her home when his mother is unable to properly care for him.
Suzie Muskrat	Pamela Matthews	4–6	An alcoholic in treatment, the mother of Charlie Muskrat, and a friend of Michelle's and Sarah's.
Sylvie LeBret	Michelle Thrush	2, 5–6	Peter's love interest in later seasons
James Harper	Peter Kelly Gaudreault	5–6	RCMP officer, who replaces Brian Fletcher
Maria Angelica Sangalli	Norma Dell'Agnese	2	Maria Sangalli and her brother Claudio Sangalli (known collectively as just "The Sangallis", a homophone of "svengali") are a pair of eccentric siblings from Italy who try to partner in business with the people of Lynx River. The siblings are later charged with fraud and are arrested in Milan, leaving Lynx River's planned tannery project dead.
Claudio Sangalli	Louis Ferreira	2	Maria Sangalli's lesser-seen brother, who is also later arrested in Milan for fraud (see "Maria Angelica Sangalli" above)
Lillian Boutilier	Doris Chillcott	4	Harris's flaky adoptive mother, with whom Harris himself has a troubled relationship.
Sister Simone	Diana LeBlanc	1	The abusive and manipulative nun and teacher at the residential school where Peter and Michelle were sent as children. Sister Simone is eventually revealed to have abused Michelle physically and mentally, something which she never apologizes for, much to Michelle's disappointment.
Father Smuts	Vladimír Valenta	4, 6	The priest who marries Harris and Lois, and who aids Harris in Season 6 after Lois suffers from a stroke. While Father Smuts promotes Catholicism, he incorporates traditional Indigenous mysticism, culture and spirituality in his church. Lois trains under him in the hopes of becoming a lay minister.
Donna Kizha	Raven Hart	1	An older friend of Hannah's who suffers from mental impairment due to fetal alcohol syndrome; Donna is a victim of rape after a group of United States soldiers get her drunk in a motel room, and she frequently parties and sleeps around to cope with her anger. After a suicide attempt, she goes to nearby Hay River for treatment.
Louis Claybank	Byron Chief-Moon	1, 4	Hannah's estranged biological father, who she later goes to live with sporadically until her death in a later season. While Louis and Michelle are bitter towards one another, they later reconcile while searching for Hannah together.
Leslie Baxter	Janne Mortil	1	Sarah's nosy student intern who Teevee also has a crush on.
Mary Cook	Columpa Bobb	2–6	A Dene nurse hired to replace Sarah after Sarah's mental breakdown. While Sarah initially detests Mary, the two later become good friends.
Kyla Tenia	Samone Sayese-Whitney	2–6	The daughter of Teevee Tenia and Bertha Kizha.
Ben "Dancing Bear" Montour	August Schellenberg	3	A pretentious drunkard known for his impressive Indigenous artworks.
Nevada	Adam Beach	1–3	A male hustler and prostitute who befriends Teevee in Vancouver. In Season 3, Nevada is revealed to be HIV-positive, and is taken care of by Willie Tsa Che and Ben Montour, who give him a place to stay and an art project to work on.
Elizabeth Golo	Shelby Crowchild	4–6	The daughter of Sarah Birkett and Albert Golo. Elizabeth is later adopted as the step-granddaughter of Joe Gomba in Season 4.
Gabe Coulee	Ben Cardinal	1–2	A mean-spirited poacher who causes trouble in Lynx River.
Daniel Deela	Lorne Cardinal	4	Leon's brother, who moves in during Season 4, leading to a dispute over the land upon which Gerry lives.
Inspector Cormier	Yvan Ponton	1–6	Michelle's boss and advisor from the RCMP, also a quasi-father figure for her.
Brenda Shore	Stacy Da Silva	4–6	An adolescent girl who Brian Fletcher has an inappropriate sexual relationship with.
David Shore	Garwin Sanford	2	An anthropologist who has an extramarital affair with Michelle, but later breaks it off.
Faith	Robin Duke	4, 6	A homely, peculiar Revenue Canada worker with whom Gerry has a brief relationship with; Faith is into kinky fetish gear and BDSM, leading to bizarre antics in Season 4 and 6 between her, Gerry and later on Bill Kovalenko, a civil servant who happens to be visiting Lynx River for auditing.

== Episodes ==
=== Season 1 (1992–93) ===
No. overall	No. in season	Title	Directed by	Written by	Original release date
1	1	"Pilot"	Stuart Margolin	Wayne Grigsby & Barbara Samuels	December 3, 1992
2	2	"Different Drummer"	Stuart Margolin	Barbara Samuels & Wayne Grigsby	December 10, 1992
3	3	"Road Not Taken"	Anne Wheeler	Rebecca Schechter	December 17, 1992
4	4	"Fair Trade"	Graeme Campbell	Charles Lazer	December 31, 1992
5	5	"Letting Go"	Stuart Margolin	Wayne Grigsby & Barbara Samuels	January 7, 1993
6	6	"Out of the Blue"	Randy Bradshaw	David Barlow	January 14, 1993
7	7	"The Reunion"	Richard Lewis	David young	January 21, 1993
8	8	"Birthright"	Randy Bradshaw	Jean Stawarz	January 28, 1993
9	9	"Cold Comfort"	Sturla Gunnarsson	Michael Mercer	February 4, 1993
10	10	"The Act of Hares"	George Bloomfield	David Barlow	February 11, 1993
11	11	"The Art of the Deal"	Joseph Scanlan	Jordan Wheeler	February 25, 1993
12	12	"Sisters of Mercy"	George Bloomfield	Rebecca Schechter	March 4, 1993
13	13	"Freeze Out"	Stacey Curtis	David Barlow	March 18, 1993
14	14	"All About Leslie"	Richard Lewis	Drew Taylor	March 25, 1993
15	15	"Southern Comfort"	Brad Turner	Wayne Grigsby & Barbara Samuels	April 1, 1993
16	16	"Fire"	Joseph Scanlan	Peter Lauterman	April 8, 1993

=== Season 2 (1993–94) ===
No. overall	No. in season	Title	Directed by	Written by	Original release date
17	1	"Bless This House"	Stacey Stewart Curtis	Wayne Grigsby & Barbara Samuels	October 7, 1993
18	2	"Ciao, Baby"	George Bloomfield	Peter Lauterman	October 14, 1993
19	3	"Miles to Go"	Stacey Stewart Curtis	Jordan Wheeler	October 21, 1993
20	4	"Hostage"	Gerard Ciccoritti	Rebecca Schechter	October 28, 1993
21	5	"Arrangements"	Randy Bradshaw	Peter Lauterman	November 4, 1993
22	6	"Rumours"	T.W. Peacocke	Andrew Wreggitt	November 11, 1993
23	7	"Lost Weekend"	Brad Turner	Barbara Samuels & Wayne Grigsby	November 18, 1993
24	8	"Raven"	Randy Bradshaw	Jordan Wheeler	December 2, 1993
25	9	"Maps and Dreams"	Eleanore Lindo	Peter Lauterman	December 9, 1993
26	10	"Born Again"	Anne Wheeler	Conni Massing	December 16, 1993
27	11	"Crossing the River"	Stacey Stewart Curtis	Robert Forsyth	January 6, 1994
28	12	"Follow the Leader"	TW Peacocke	Arthur Samuels	January 13, 1994
29	13	"Trapped"	Stacey Stewart Curtis	Thomas King	January 20, 1994
30	14	"All Fall Down"	Stuart Margolin & Tom Jackson	Hart Hanson	January 27, 1994
31	15	"Harvest"	TW Peacocke	Stuart Margolin	February 3, 1994
32	16	"The Getting of Wisdom"	Bruce Pittman	Wayne Grigsby & Barbara Samuels	February 10, 1994

=== Season 3 (1994–95) ===
No. overall	No. in season	Title	Directed by	Written by	Original release date
33	1	"Fallen Angel"	TW Peacocke	Peter Lauterman	October 6, 1994
34	2	"The Long Goodbye"	Richard Lewis	Hart Hanson	October 13, 1994
35	3	"Pulling Up Stakes"	TW Peacocke	Stacey Kaser	October 24, 1994
36	4	"Partners"	Richard Lewis	Jordan Wheeler	October 27, 1994
37	5	"The Cure"	Jeff Woolnough	Hart Hanson	November 3, 1994
38	6	"A Rock and a Hard Place"	Eleanore Lindo	Wayne Grigsby & Barbara Samuels	November 10, 1994
39	7	"Spin Dry"	Gil Cardinal	Jordan Wheeler	November 17, 1994
40	8	"You Can't Get There from Here"	Alan Simmonds	Andrew Wreggritt	November 24, 1994
41	9	"The Gift"	Joanna McIntyre	Peter Lauterman	December 1, 1994
42	10	"The Ties That Bind"	Brad Turner	Thomas King	December 8, 1994
43	11	"Break Dance"	Ken Jubenvill	Jordan Wheeler	December 15, 1994
44	12	"Bargains"	TW Peacocke	Wayne Grigsby & Barbara Samuels	January 5, 1995
45	13	"Shelter"	Alan Simmonds	Stacey Kaser	January 12, 1995
46	14	"The Hunt"	TW Peacocke	Peter Lauterman	January 19, 1995
47	15	"Life Is a Memory"	Gil Cardinal	Robert Forsyth	January 26, 1995
48	16	"The Trial"	Stacey Stewart Curtis	Hart Hanson	February 2, 1995

=== Season 4 (1995–96) ===
No. overall	No. in season	Title	Directed by	Written by	Original release date
49	1	"Refugees"	Ken Jubenvill	Peter Lauterman	October 12, 1995
50	2	"Arrival and Departure"	David Warry-Smith	Jordan Wheeler	October 19, 1995
51	3	"At Home and Away"	Brad Turner	Robert Forsyth	October 26, 1995
52	4	"Limbo"	Ken Jubenvill	Andrew Rai Berzins	November 2, 1995
53	5	"The Visit"	TW Peacocke	Andrew Wreggritt	November 9, 1995
54	6	"Take Me Home"	Stacey Curtis	Hart Hanson	November 16, 1995
55	7	"The Weight"	Alan Simmonds	Peter Lauterman	November 30, 1995
56	8	"A Shot Rang Out"	Gil Cardinal	Jordan Wheeler	December 7, 1995
57	9	"Revolving Door"	Jeff Woolnough	Stacey Kaser	December 14, 1995
58	10	"Moonlight Sonata"	Alan Simmonds	Andrew Wreggitt	January 4, 1996
59	11	"Vantage Point"	E. Jane Thompson	Andrew Rai Berzins	January 11, 1996
60	12	"Traces and Tracks"	Gil Cardinal	Rob Forsyth	January 18, 1996
61	13	"To Have and to Hold"	Richard Lewis	Hart Hanson	January 25, 1996
62	14	"A Safe House"	Joanna McIntyre	Peter Lauterman	February 1, 1996
63	15	"Prodigal Son"	Jeremy Podeswa	Jordan Wheeler	February 8, 1996
64	16	"Tango"	TW Peacocke	Story by : Andrew Rai Berzins & Andrew Wreggitt; Teleplay by : Andrew Wreggitt	February 15, 1996

=== Season 5 (1996–97) ===
No. overall	No. in season	Title	Directed by	Written by	Original release date
65	1	"Slow Burn"	TW Peacocke	Andrew Wreggitt	October 3, 1996
66	2	"Bushman"	Gil Cardinal	Andrew Rai Berzins	October 10, 1996
67	3	"Never Surrender"	TW Peacocke	Peter Lauterman	October 17, 1996
68	4	"Partners and Other Strangers"	Alan Simmonds	Story by : Tim Dunphy; Teleplay by : Peter Lauterman & Andrew Wreggitt	October 24, 1996
69	5	"Fear of Flying"	Gil Cardinal	Katherine Schlemmer	October 31, 1996
70	6	"The Watchers"	Alan Simmonds	Robert Forsyth	November 7, 1996
71	7	"Simple Sufferings"	David Warry-Smith	Thomas King	November 14, 1996
72	8	"A Shimmer of Scales"	Scott Summersgill	Andrew Rai Berzins	November 21, 1996
73	9	"Suspicious Minds"	Jeff Woolnough	Andrew Wreggitt	December 5, 1996
74	10	"A Deeper Silence"	Gil Cardinal	Peter Lauterman	December 12, 1996
75	11	"Walking with Ghosts"	Richard J. Lewis	Andrew Rai Berzins	January 2, 1997
76	12	"Hunting in the Dark"	Stacey Stewart Curtis	Andrew Wreggitt	January 9, 1997
77	13	"The Higher Law"	Richard J. Lewis	Peter Lauterman & Cheryl Foggo	January 16, 1997

=== Season 6 (1997) ===
No. overall	No. in season	Title	Directed by	Written by	Original release date
78	1	"The Road"	Alan Simmonds	Peter Lauterman & Andre Wreggitt	September 25, 1997
79	2	"Cold"	Scott Summersgill	Stacey Kaser	October 2, 1997
80	3	"Ghosts"	Alan Simmonds	Tony Di Franco	October 9, 1997
81	4	"Sleeping Dogs"	TW Peacocke	Peter Lauterman & Andrew Wreggitt	October 16, 1997
82	5	"Love Hurts"	Gil Cardinal	Cheryl Foggo	October 23, 1997
83	6	"Peter & the Wolf"	Alan Simmonds	Drew Birch	October 30, 1997
84	7	"Oil & Water"	TW Peacocke	Tim Southam	November 6, 1997
85	8	"The Road"	Scott Summersgill	Andrew Wreggitt	November 13, 1997
86	9	"Heroes (For One Day)"	Stacey Stewart Curtis	Peter Lauterman	November 20, 1997
87	10	"The Smell of Violets"	Geraint Wyn Davies	Tony Di Franco	November 27, 1997
88	11	"A Sparrow Falls"	David Warry-Smith	Stacey Kaser	December 4, 1997
89	12	"I Shall Not Want"	Andrew R. Price	Peter Lauterman	December 11, 1997
90	13	"Borrowed Time"	Stacey Stewart Curtis	Andrew Wreggitt	December 18, 1997

== Series ==
The series ran weekly until 1997, and followed seasonal changes in character arcs:

=== Season 1 ===
RCMP Corporal Eric Olsen moves to Lynx River from an undercover drug operation in Vancouver, becoming acquainted with the town's issues and citizens. Events of note include a physical run-in with local bad boy Trevor Victor "Teevee" Tenia, Eric's divorce from his wife, Michelle coping with an abusive former teacher who bullied her at the residential school, Leon trying to quit drinking (and subsequently marrying Rosie), a girl named Donna struggling with the impacts of fetal alcohol syndrome, Sarah having a romance with Eric, Teevee threatening to air an amateur porno tape he made of Eric and Sarah that he recorded while playing peeping tom in Sarah's window, Teevee running away to Vancouver and having a bad experience with local male prostitute and hustler Nevada, and Michelle trying to cope with the loss of her and Hannah's house in a fire, among other things. Sarah struggles to fit in as a white woman and is at odds with Ellen over the debate of having a natural home birth versus a hospital birth in Yellowknife. Albert Golo is shot by an unknown gunman after Leon and Rey pass out drunk in the cold, and Rey (Leon's best friend) freezes to death. Peter is revealed to have had an affair using Band money to pay for his mistress's accommodations, which Harris had helped to cover up.

=== Season 2 ===
Season 2's main plot device revolves around the town's dealings with an Italian brother-and-sister duo involved with fashion design who help to fund the building of a tannery in Lynx River. This raises the ire of two liberal animal rights activists who cause conflict regarding animal welfare versus Native ways of hunting and trapping. Gerry invests fifty-thousand dollars (his life's savings) in the tannery at Harris and Peter's goading, while Harris begins a sexual romance with Lois Tenia, much to Teevee's disgust. Teevee himself deals with fatherhood after getting Bertha pregnant, while Sarah has a mental breakdown and becomes lost in the bush. After a stint in a mental hospital, she begins an apparent sexual relationship with Albert, which upsets the other townsfolk. Hannah struggles with being "the Mountie's kid" and begins acting out rebelliously, while Teevee learns how to write grant proposals and raise the morale of the Lynx River children. Eric is horrified after his teenage son, Andy, begins expressing racism towards the Native residents of the town, a bigoted attitude which he apparently picked up from his mother's new boyfriend, Bill. After the Italian siblings are charged with international fraud, the tannery project fails, Gerry loses all of his money, and Rosie begins drinking again. Michelle shoots and kills Andre, a violent man, during a hostage situation.

=== Season 3 ===
Albert is elected chief of Lynx River, replacing Peter and leaving the town with a serious alcoholism problem. Rosie recovers after a cathartic experience with Sarah on the riverbank, and Gerry reluctantly hires Rosie back to work as his business partner. Betty Moses, an abrasive but kind-hearted woman, attempts to run a treatment centre in town and finds that Sarah is a surprisingly beloved friend of her patients. Bertha returns and shacks up in her grandmother's dilapidated house, where Teevee and their infant daughter gradually move in. Peter struggles with his hopes to move to Ottawa for business in conflict with his desire to stay home, and a pompous artist, Ben Montour, arrives in Lynx River with an alcohol problem, sleeping with Lois, much to Harris's chagrin. Hannah steals a boombox from Gerry's store and Michelle tries to reconcile with her, trying to find out where the bad behaviour is coming from. Olsen is murdered in a shooting while out of town, and his estranged ex-wife arrives with invasive demands, which bothers Sarah and Michelle. Brian Fletcher, a new RCMP officer, takes Olsen's place. Nathan Golo recruits Teevee into bootlegging, Sarah leaves Albert, and Nathan is caught, resulting in him being banned from the community. Teevee is reunited with Nevada, who reveals that he is HIV positive.

=== Season 4 ===
Sarah gives birth to Albert's child (a daughter named Elizabeth), which puts her in a precarious situation as Albert and her own estranged white family fight over custody of the child. Gerry has a nervous breakdown after a series of unfortunate events befall him, and Rosie learns that Gerry's own family in Ukraine was impacted by the Holodomor in the 1930s. Nathan begins developing mental health issues due to his ban, and Hannah returns to Lynx River, now wearing punk garb and having a noticeably different attitude. She goes missing in the city, and Michelle searches for her, reuniting with Hannah's father and meeting a man named Andrew One Sky who both aid her. Rosie learns secrets about the murder of her beloved father two decades prior. Brian Fletcher brings his wife, Rosemary (a devout Christian) to Lynx River, where they both struggle with marital problems due to their inability to conceive a child, including a miscarriage that is difficult on both of them. Teevee argues with Bertha after meeting a new partner (Anne-Marie), and Harris and Lois plan to marry. Gerry reveals that he has romantic feelings for Rosie, and Michelle meets Charlie Muskrat, the child of a chronic alcoholic who needs a more supportive place to stay. Michelle also learns that Hannah was killed in a fall from a high bridge, which shatters her emotionally; Rosie's son, Wayne, also struggles deeply with Hannah's loss, while Betty Moses pushes Michelle to get rid of Hannah's belongings as a gesture of letting go of the tragedy, something that Michelle finds intrusive.

=== Season 5 ===
Teevee invests in a sawmill project to earn an honest living, while Brian and Rosemary consider adopting a child. Michelle becomes a mother figure for Charlie. Sarah struggles with Albert over custody of Elizabeth, and this leads to Joe Gumba deciding to adopt Sarah as his own daughter, which will keep Elizabeth raised in a Dene way but prevent Albert from encroaching on Sarah's parenthood. Andrew One Sky keeps a relationship with Michelle, but decides that he wants to try to run his own business, which Albert attempts to sabotage. Leon goes away on business, leaving Rosie alone. She becomes closer with Gerry, but Gerry then learns that Leon is cheating on her and wonders whether to keep it a secret or not in order to protect Rosie's feelings. Brian expresses lust for Sarah, which Sarah doesn't reciprocate. Brian then becomes increasingly erratic and commits suicide - or so it appears. Albert's house burns down and he disappears, but Sarah believes that the fire was deliberate and that Albert is still alive somewhere. Conflicts arise over the building of a new road and the future of Lynx River, while Charlie deals with his difficult past and traumatic upbringing. Gerry distracts himself from Rosie with a short-lived relationship involving a surly loan officer, who later dumps Gerry for a Revenue Canada employee in a bizarre affair. Nathan Golo grows closer with Sarah but is torn between caring for her and wanting to help Albert.

=== Season 6 ===
Constable James Harper replaces Brian Fletcher, but Michelle is still suspicious over Brian's inexplicable suicide. The road-building commences in Lynx River, giving Teevee a job, which also leads him to learn about the consequences of radicalism when he gets involved with a leftist group protesting the project and expressing this with violence. Michelle is attacked, leading to an investigation, while Rosie finds out about Leon's cheating and confronts him about it. Lois has a baby, and Manfred and Teevee become struck in a blizzard, forced to huddle together for warmth in order to survive, which oddly brings them closer together as friends. Michelle returns to work but acts strangely around Charlie, leading her to consider quitting her RCMP job. Sarah and Nathan discover disturbing news about Albert when he returns to Lynx River. Gerry considers leaving Lynx River, and reveals more about his troubled past and family to Rosie; the two finally admit to having romantic feelings for one another, sharing a kiss. Peter struggles with the consequences of his tax corruption. Harper finally has the means to arrest Albert, but Albert himself is terminally ill and has different plans for how he wants to go down, confronting Joe Gumba about it.

- Character Brian Fletcher's suicide is explored further in subsequent North of 60 follow-up films.

== Telefilms ==
After the end of filming on the series, a series of telemovies were made. From 1999 through 2005 there were five made-for-TV films featuring various members of the show's recurring cast. These movies include In The Blue Ground (1999), Trial by Fire (2000), Dream Storm (2001), Another Country (2003), and Distant Drumming (2005).

== Production ==
North of 60 soundtrack album on CD. The album, released in 1994 by Alliance Communications Corporation, contained songs by Tim McCauley, Tom Jackson, and Bertha Norwegian.

A soundtrack album was produced in 1994, including theme music, background music, and songs performed by Tom Jackson and others. Other background soundtracks for the series, which were never listed in the credits for the episodes, were generally by Canadian bands and included various samples from Tom Jackson's album No Regrets as well as "Just Another Day" by Kevin Jordan, "E Uassiuian" by Kashtin, "Honky Tonk Choir Boy" by Chris Ward, and "New Orleans Is Sinking" by the Tragically Hip.

The series was filmed in Bragg Creek, Alberta. Its provincial park appears in many episodes as well as in the television films. The set for the town of Lynx River itself was a series of facsimile buildings, fully functioning and contained within a small area, designed by Douglas Higgins.

== Cultural impact ==
North of 60 has been listed as an important exploration of Indigenous culture and Canadian life in rural areas, as well as one of few fictional depictions of Indigenous cultures in a thoughtful and realistic way. After the show had ceased airing on television, fans gathered to request re-airings of the existing episodes on television, as well as a DVD video release of all 6 seasons. While no DVD release ever happened, APTN (Aboriginal Peoples Television Network) decided to routinely re-air episodes of North of 60, with APTN CEO Jean La Rose stating, "when the show originally aired in 1992 it became the most popular series in Canadian history, drawing almost a million viewers per week. It’s apparent that fans miss the show and would love to see it back on the air. APTN has been listening and is thrilled to bring the show back to Canadian television!" APTN also offers digital streaming of the series on its own website.

A promotional poster advertising the digital release of North of 60, alongside a list of cast and crew names.

North of 60 has developed a cult following, including a consistently active but private Facebook group with over 10,000 members, and a fan website featuring interviews from multiple actors and actresses from the show; the website, created by longtime fan Patty Winter, was featured in the university textbook Outside Looking In: Viewing First Nations Peoples in Canadian Dramatic Television Series by Mary Jane Miller.

North of 60 is mostly in Canadian English, although Slavey language, Canadian French and Ukrainian language were incorporated. Lubomir Mykytiuk, who played Gerry Kisilenko, had incorporated Ukrainian language and a song into the show (during character Harris Miller's wedding), and for a scene involving a family scrapbook from Ukraine, Mykytiuk (who was born in Ukraine himself) brought in his own family photos for the scene. According to Mykytiuk, "it's a lovely story with the scrapbook because the art director actually called my mum in Montreal and asked whether she had any pictures of me when I was a child. So that helped. It was quite something."
