= Finding Oscar =

Documentary film on Guatemalan massacre

- Directed by: Ryan Suffern
- Written by: Mark Monroe, Ryan Suffern
- Produced by: Ryan Suffern, Frank Marshall
- Cinematography: Mike Parry
- Music by: Paul Pilot, John Stirratt
- Release date: 3 September 2016
- Running time: 100 minutes
- Countries: Canada, Guatemala, United States
- Languages: English, Spanish

Finding Oscar is a 2016 documentary film that explores the Dos Erres massacre, perpetrated by the Armed Forces of Guatemala in the department of Petén on 6 December 1982. It was directed by Ryan Suffern and Steven Spielberg was the executive producer. The Kennedy/Marshall Company was the production company, in association with the USC Shoah Foundation, the Friends of FAFG, and Diamond Docs.

The "Oscar" of the title refers to Oscar Alfredo Ramirez Castañeda, one of the few survivors of the massacre, who was found living in the U.S. state of Massachusetts and whose story the documentary narrates. Other appearances are made by U.S. archivist and researcher Kate Doyle, former attorney-general of Guatemala Claudia Paz y Paz, human rights activist Aura Elena Farfán of GAM and FAMDEGUA, U.S. foreign correspondent Sebastian Rotella, and Fredy Peccerelli of the Guatemalan Forensic Anthropology Foundation (FAFG). Presidents Ronald Reagan and Efraín Ríos Montt appear in archive footage.

== Awards ==
Finding Oscar won Best Documentary, Best Director and Best Editing at the 2016 Boston Film Festival.
