= Phoebe Stubblefield =

American forensic anthropologist

Phoebe R. Stubblefield

Academic background
- Education: University of California, Santa Barbara; University of Texas; University of Florida

Academic work
- Discipline: Forensic anthropology

Phoebe Stubblefield is an American forensic anthropologist specializing in human skeletal variation, human identification, and paleopathology. She is currently the Interim Director of the C.A. Pound Human Identification Laboratory at the University of Florida. She was formerly an associate professor at the University of North Dakota, where she also served as Chair of the Anthropology Department and Director of the Forensic Science Program. Her research integrates cultural anthropology and forensic science. She is currently leading efforts to locate and identify the remains of hundreds of victims of the 1921 Tulsa race massacre.

== Education ==
Stubblefield graduated with a B.A. from the University of California, Santa Barbara in 1990. Following this, she earned her M.A. at the University of Texas in 1993 and her Ph.D. from the University of Florida in 2002. She was the last graduate student of William R. Maples, the founder of the C.A. Pound Human Identification Laboratory at the Florida Museum of Natural History.

== Research and career ==
Stubblefield was a professor at the University of North Dakota from 2003 to 2018. During this time, she served as the Director of the Forensic Science Program from 2003 to 2016 and as the Chair of the Anthropology Department from 2010 to 2011. While at the University of North Dakota, Stubblefield oversaw the creation of a new lab space and the expansion of the forensic science program. In 2007, Stubblefield became a fellow of the Academy of Forensic Sciences. Stubblefield also served as the Section Chair of the Anthropology Section of the American Academy of Forensic Sciences from 2014 to 2016 and as the Section Secretary of the Physical Anthropology Section of the American Academy of Forensic Sciences from 2013 to 2014. Since 2018, she has been a Research Assistant Scientist at the University of Florida C.A. Pound Human Identification Laboratory. As of 2021, Stubblefield was the interim director of the C.A. Pound Human Identification Laboratory.

=== Tulsa race massacre ===
Stubblefield currently leads efforts to recover and analyze human remains associated with the Tulsa race massacre of 1921, which destroyed a flourishing Black community and left up to 300 people dead. Stubblefield has been involved in efforts to locate the bodies of the Tulsa race massacre victims since 1990 when she was invited by historian Scott Ellsworth to join the team. She was a member of the original 1921 Tulsa Race Riot Commission created by the Oklahoma state legislature in 1997 and later disbanded in 2001. A second commission was formed ahead of the massacre's centenary in 2021. The search for remains was largely unfruitful until 2019, when a team of historians and forensic archaeologists identified an area of Oaklawn Cemetery in north Tulsa as a possible grave site for some of the bodies. The team discovered human remains in this area through ground-penetrating radar in fall 2020. Stubblefield plans to study the bodies following their exhumation in June 2021. She will assess the bodies for gunshot wounds or bullets within the skeleton to determine whether the bodies belong to victims of the massacre. Though direct identification of the victims may not be possible, she still anticipates her work will lead to the creation of memorials for the victims and reveal what their last moments may have been like. Since there are very few Black forensic anthropologists like herself, Stubblefield explains that this project is a "rare chance [to] let a Black person use Black bodies to tell their story". Stubblefield also holds personal connections to the massacre, as her great-aunt survived the massacre but lost her house in the 1921 attack. Her parents also grew up in Tulsa and Stubblefield frequently visited the city as a child.

=== Awards and honors ===
Stubblefield has received the Williams R. Maples Scholarship from the University of Florida in 1999, a Ford Foundation Dissertation Fellowship in 2001, the Goggin Fellowship from the Department of Anthropology University of Florida in 2002, and the Ellis R. Kerley Foundation Award from the American Academy of Forensic Sciences in 2003. In 2023 Stubblefield was awarded Fellow of the American Association for the Advancement of Science.
