= Opinion polling for the 2019 Guatemalan general election =

This page lists public opinion polls conducted for the 2019 Guatemalan general election, which was held in on 16 June 2019. Because no candidate won a majority, a run-off occurred on 11 August 2019.

== Second round ==
Polling Firm	Date	Sample size	Giammattei Vamos	Torres UNE	None	Lead
Second round	11 August	—	57.95	42.05	—	15.90
Average	10 July–10 August	6,021	53.23	46.76	(N/A)	6.47
CID-Gallup	29 July–5 August	1.216	54.9	45.1	--	--
Prodatos	27 July–3 August	1.201	50.3	32.1	17.6	18.2
OPol Consultores	24–26 July	2.400	44.7	49.1	6.1	4.4
CID-Gallup	9–14 July	1.204	40.6	33.4	25.9	7.2
First round	16 June	—	12.1	22.1	—	10.0
CID-Gallup	1–7 June	1.204	11.6	22.6	22.9	1.0
Prodatos	27 May–5 June	1.004	54.0	32.0	14.0	22.0

=== Alternative scenarios ===
Polling firm	Date	Sample size	Arzú PAN–Podemos	Mulet Humanist	Torres UNE	None	Lead
First round	16 June	—	—	11.2	25.5	—	14.3
First round	16 June	—	6.1	—	25.5	—	19.4
Prodatos	13 June	1,004	—	42.0	36.0	22.0	6.0
Prodatos	13 June	1,004	46.0	—	33.0	21.0	13.0
CID-Gallup	1–7 June	1,204	36.0	—	33.0	31.0	3.0

== First round ==
=== After resolutions ===
Polling firm	Date	Sample size	Torres UNE	Giammattei Vamos	Arzú PAN–P	Mulet PHG	T. Cabrera MLP	Farchi VIVA	F. Cabrera Todos	Estrada CREO	Others	None	Lead
Presidential election	16 June	—	25.54	13.95	6.08	11.21	10.37	5.90	3.13	3.75			
Prodatos	13 June	1,004	20.2	14.4	8.0	8.5	7.6	3.2	3.0	2.8	16.6	15.7	5.8
CID-Gallup	30 May–7 June	1,204	22.6	11.6	9.2	6.4	5.5	2.8	2.8	1.3	15.1	22.7	11.0
CID-Gallup	21 May-25 May	1,202	21.0	12.0	9.0	7.0	5.0	4.0	2.0	2.0	10.0	28.0	9.0
OPol Consultores	20 May-23 May	2,200	23.36	10.77	13.18	8.63	3.22	1.72	0.63	1.22	11.99	25.28	10.18

=== Before resolutions ===
Polling firm	Fieldwork date	Sample size	Aldana Semilla	Arzú PAN–P	Escobar PC	Giammattei Vamos	Torres UNE	Ríos Valor	N/A	Others	Lead
CID-Gallup	15 May	1,747	8.0	8.0	2.0	9.0	21.0	14.0	24.0	22.0	7.0
On May 15, 2019, Thelma Aldana is out of the elections.
On May 13, 2019, Zury Rios is out of the elections.
TResearch	15 April	1,000	23.7	—	—	10.8	17.1	15.7	—	32.7	6.6
TResearch	14 April	1,000	24.1	—	—	11.0	16.5	16.0	—	32.4	7.6
TResearch	13 April	1,000	24.4	—	—	11.5	16.3	15.7	—	32.1	8.1
TResearch	12 April	1,000	24.1	—	—	11.5	14.8	16.2	—	33.4	7.9
TResearch	11 April	1,000	24.5	—	—	10.8	14.8	16.1	—	33.8	8.4
TResearch	10 April	1,000	24.6	—	—	11.7	14.1	15.8	—	33.8	8.8
TResearch	9 April	1,000	24.9	—	—	11.8	14.2	15.7	—	33.4	9.2
TResearch	8 April	1,000	25.2	—	—	12.1	14.8	15.6	—	32.3	9.6
TResearch	7 April	1,000	25.1	—	—	11.7	14.4	15.4	—	33.4	9.7
TResearch	6 April	1,000	25.3	—	—	11.8	14.3	14.7	—	33.9	10.6
TResearch	5 April	1,000	25.0	—	—	11.6	14.7	14.3	—	34.6	10.3
TResearch	4 April	1,000	25.1	—	—	11.6	15.3	13.8	—	34.2	9.6
TResearch	3 April	1,000	24.6	—	—	12.0	14.5	13.5	—	35.4	10.1
TResearch	2 April	1,000	24.2	—	—	12.2	15.0	13.4	—	35.2	9.2
TResearch	1 April	1,000	23.8	—	—	12.5	15.5	13.3	—	34.9	8.3
Prodatos	19–27 March	1,200	9.5	3.8	1.1	7.4	20.7	15.9	26.1	24	4.8
March 18, 2019, the electoral campaign begins.
CID-Gallup	16–25 February	1,258	10.7	2.8	3.1	5.8	17.7	7.9	40.9	11.1	7
Consulta Mitofsky	8–11 February	1,000	28.1	—	—	14.4	6.1	17.6	8.5	21.2	10.5
CID-Gallup	24 January–4 February	1,815	10	2	3	5	17	7	46	10	7

== Favorable or unfavorable opinions ==
=== Favorable opinions ===
Polling firm	Fieldwork date	Sample size	Aldana Semilla	Arzú PAN–P	Escobar PC	Estrada UCN	Galdámez FCN	Giammattei Vamos	Montenegro EG	Torres UNE	Ríos Valor
Consulta Mitofsky	8–11 February	1,000	36	8	—	11	2	22	12	9	31

=== Unfavorable opinions ===
Polling firm	Fieldwork date	Sample size	Aldana Semilla	Arzú PAN–P	Escobar PC	Estrada UCN	Galdámez FCN	Giammattei Vamos	Montenegro EG	Mulet PHG	Torres UNE	Ríos Valor
Consulta Mitofsky	8–11 February	1,000	27	56	—	30	62	25	32	—	66	28

=== Most favorite for president ===
Polling firm	Fieldwork date	Sample size	Aldana Semilla	Arzú PAN–P	Escobar PC	Galdámez FCN	Giammattei Vamos	Montenegro EG	Mulet PHG	Torres UNE	Ríos Valor
Consulta Mitofsky	8–11 February	1,000	35	—	—	—	—	—	—	9	—

=== Least favorite for president ===
Polling firm	Fieldwork date	Sample size	Aldana Semilla	Arzú PAN–P	Escobar PC	Galdámez FCN	Giammattei Vamos	Torres UNE	Ríos Valor
CID-Gallup	1–7 June	1,204	—	3.3	—	1.8	2.2	34.1	—
CID-Gallup	8–13 May	1,747	10	2	—	—	—	28	3
CID-Gallup	16–25 February	1,258	6.2	3.5	—	3.2	3.4	21.2	6.5
Consulta Mitofsky	8–11 February	1,000	12.6	—	—	—	2.0	40	4.4
