= Louis Gottschalk =

Louis Gottschalk may refer to:

- Louis Moreau Gottschalk (1829–1869), American composer
- Louis F. Gottschalk (1864–1934), American composer, grand-nephew of Louis M.
- Louis R. Gottschalk (1899–1975), American historian
- Louis A. Gottschalk (1916–2008, American psychiatrist
