= EAAF =

EAAF may refer to:

- East Asian–Australasian Flyway, a Pacific Rim bird migration flyway stretching from the southern coast of Alaska to the Taimyr Peninsula in Russia southward to encompass Australia and New Zealand
- Equipo Argentino de Antropología Forense, the Argentine Forensic Anthropology Team
- Egyptian Army Air Force, a precursor of the Egyptian Air Force
