= Estimation of stature =

Forensic anthropology technique

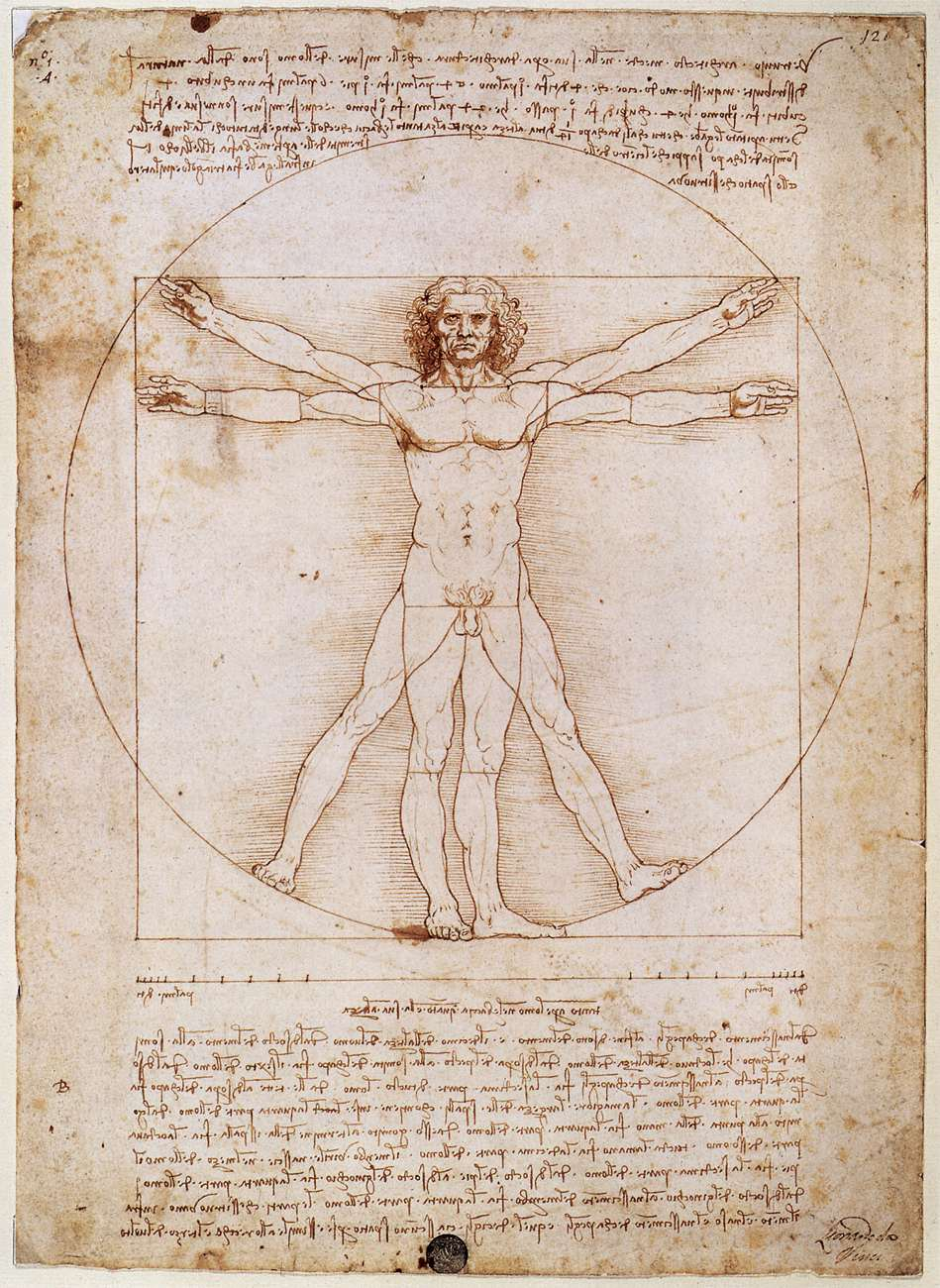
The body proportions of Vitruvian Man. The armspan is marked equal to the stature of the subject. Leonardo da Vinci developed rules for drawing human proportions. For example, human body height is to be the length of eight heads, with an additional one-quarter head for neck length. Leg length is to be four head lengths.

Forensic estimation of stature is part of the identification process necessary when dismembered body parts are found. It is also possible to estimate the stature from bones. Even measurements of parts of the body, such as a finger, can be used to estimate the stature.

The principle behind this forensic anthropology technique is the fact that for a given combination of age, race, and gender there measurements of different body parts which have a relationship to the stature. This relationship between the measurements of body parts was known to sculptors and artists. In modern times, regression formulae are used to estimate stature from bones, fragments of bones or measurements of body parts.

== History ==
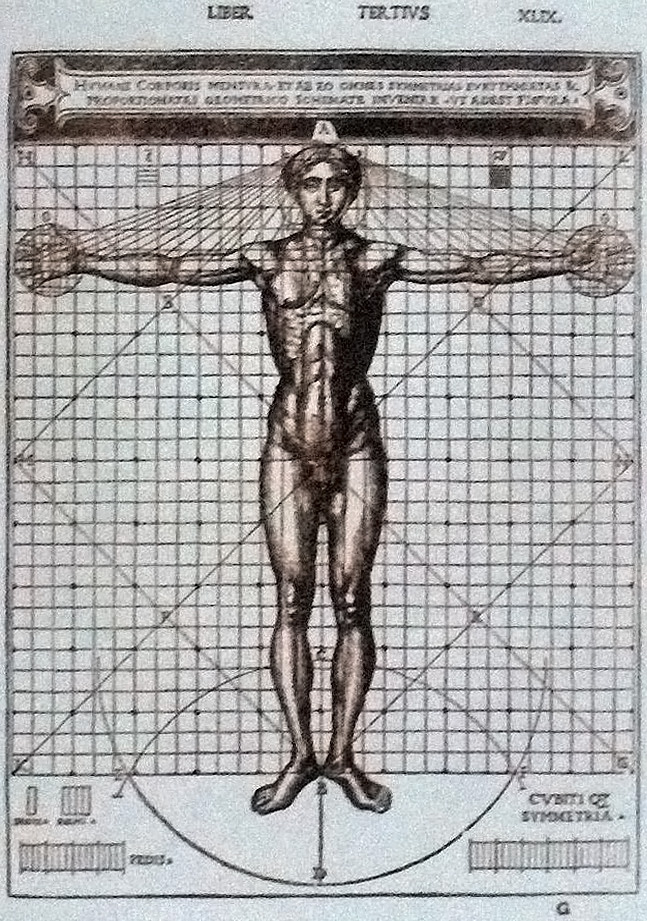
"Vitruvian Man", illustration in the edition of De architectura by Vitruvius; illustrated edition by Cesare Cesariano (1521)

Vitruvius, who lived in the first century BC had put forth the proportions of human body in Book III, Chapter 1..

3. Just so the parts of Temples should correspond with each other, and with the whole. The navel is naturally placed in the centre of the human body, and, if in a man lying with his face upward, and his hands and feet extended, from his navel as the centre, a circle be described, it will touch his fingers and toes. It is not alone by a circle, that the human body is thus circumscribed, as may be seen by placing it within a square. For measuring from the feet to the crown of the head, and then across the arms fully extended, we find the latter measure equal to the former; so that lines at right angles to each other, enclosing the figure, will form a square.

Leonardo da Vinci had based the proportions of the famous Vitruvian Man on his writings.

== Modern Research ==
In 1888 Rollet measured the stature and the lengths of the long bones of 50 male and 50 female French cadavers ranging in age from 24 to 99 years, and presented tables for stature estimation. He determined the average length of the long bones of those who presented the same stature.

Manouvrier (1892 and 1893) found that due to the effect of old age the length of the trunk was 3 cm less than the maximum stature. He excluded those aged above 60 years from his sample and derived tables of average stature corresponding to given long bone lengths. Manouvrier determined the average stature of those individuals who presented the same lengths for a given long bone.

Karl Pearson (1899) applied stature regression formulae utilizing all of Rollet's cases.

In 1929 Stevenson accumulated data on Northern Chinese male cadavers using the same methods as those used by Rollet. He found that the stature regression formulae he derived could not be used to determine the stature of the French population and Pearson's formulae derived for the French could not be used in his sample.

Breitinger (1937) measured the distance between certain anatomical prominence in a sample of 2400 German males of whom 1400 were participants in an athletic meet in Munich in 1923. 1000 members of the sample were students in 1925–26. The average age of the group was about 26 years.

Telkka (1950) studied 154 Finnish cadavers, 115 males and 39 females. The average age of the males in the sample was 42.3 years and of the females 50.4 years. The stature of the cadavers was measured on the "prostrate" corpse and the bones were measured after maceration and drying.

Dupertuis and Hadden (1951) derived regression equations for calculation of stature from a sample of 100 white males, 100 white females, 100 Black males and 100 Black females.

Mildred Trotter and Goldine Gleser (1952) compared the stature of servicemen (white American males and Black American males) in their military records and the length of bones of the skeletal remains measured at the time of their repatriation. They later analyzed the same data obtained after the Korean War. This time, they derived regression equations for white American males, Black American males, Asian American males, Mexican American males and Puerto Rican males.

== Calculation of Stature from the Length of Long Bones ==
Many different equations are in use for estimation of stature from the length of long bones.

=== Karl Pearson ===
He derived reconstruction formulae for living stature from dry bones. The probable error is given in parentheses.

Bone	Male Whites	Female Whites
Femur	81.306 + 1.880 F (±0.3047)	72.844 + 1.945 F (±0.3058)
Tibia	78.664 + 2.376 T (±0.3275)	74.774 + 2.352 T (±0.3146)
Humerus	70.641 + 2.894 H (±0.3056)	71.475 + 2.754 H (±0.3284)
Radius	85.925 + 3.271 R (±0.3728)	81.224 + 3.343 R (±0.3816)
Femur & Tibia	71.272 + 1.159 (F + T) (±0.2835)	69.154 + 1.126 (F + T) (±0.2898)
Humerus & Radius	66.855 + 1.730 (H + R) (±0.3139)	69.911 + 1.628 (H + R) (±0.3380)
Femur & Tibia	71.443 + 1.220 F + 1.080 T (±0.2845)	69.561 + 1.117 F + 1.125 T (±0.2922)
Humerus & Radius	69.788 + 2.769 H + 0.195 R (±0.3054)	70.542 + 2.582 H + 0.281 R (±0.3279)
Femur & Humerus	68.397 + 1.030 F + 1.557 H (±0.2750)	67.435 + 1.339 F + 1.037 H (±0.2971)
Femur, Tibia, Humerus & Radius	67.049 + 0.913 F + 0.600 T + 1.225 H - 0.187 R (±0.2748)	67.469 + 0.782 F + 1.120 T + 1.059 H - 0.711 R (±0.2836)

=== Trotter and Gleser ===
The regression equations to calculate stature in centimeters for male servicemen belonging to different races derived by Trotter and Gleser. Probable errors are given within parentheses.

Bone	Whites	Blacks	Asian Americans	Mexicans	Puerto Ricans
Rt Humerus	2.88 H_{R} + 77.70 (±4.61)	2.88 H_{R} + 75.52 (±4.26)	2.69 H_{R} + 82.80 (±4.32)	3.01 H_{R} + 70.40 (±4.29)	2.45 H_{R} + 88.45 (±3.96)
Lt Humerus	2.89 H_{L} + 77.47 (±4.54)	2.89 H_{L} + 75.10 (±4.21)	2.68 H_{L} + 83.27 (±4.18)	2.82 H_{L} + 77.32 (±4.20)	2.79 H_{L} + 77.18 (±3.63)
Rt Radius	3.77 R_{R} + 79.13 (±4.66)	3.28 R_{R} + 86.22 (±4.65)	3.58 R_{R} + 80.71 (±4.64)	3.79 R_{R} + 74.59 (±4.09)	3.24 R_{R} + 86.76 (±4.00)
Lt Radius	3.73 R_{L} + 80.62 (±4.59)	3.36 R_{L} + 84.63 (±4.50)	3.51 R_{L} + 83.40 (±4.55)	3.30 R_{L} + 87.05 (±4.00)	3.33 R_{L} + 85.20 (±3.80)
Rt Ulna	3.59 U_{R} + 76.95 (±4.71)	3.13 U_{R} + 84.42 (±4.73)	3.50 U_{R} + 76.07 (±4.84)	3.82 U_{R} + 67.67 (±3.92)	3.11 U_{R} + 84.60 (±4.02)
Lt Ulna	3.64 U_{L} + 76.14 (±4.57)	3.28 U_{L} + 80.85 (±4.76)	3.46 U_{L} + 78.84 (±4.49)	3.30 U_{L} + 81.46 (±4.18)	3.48 U_{L} + 75.59 (±3.81)
Rt Femur	2.25 F_{R} + 68.40 (±4.04)	2.07 F_{R} + 73.78 (±3.83)	2.12 F_{R} + 74.03 (±3.92)	2.41 F_{R} + 59.84 (±3.10)	2.09 F_{R} + 72.86 (±3.18)
Lt Femur	2.30 F_{L} + 65.82 (±3.97)	2.14 F_{L} + 70.19 (±3.99)	2.18 F_{L} + 71.11 (±3.67)	2.47 F_{L} + 57.51 (±2.88)	2.11 F_{L} + 72.36 (±3.19)
Rt Tibia	2.40 T_{R} + 82.24 (±3.97)	2.20 T_{R} + 84.90 (±3.88)	2.42 T_{R} + 80.36 (±3.26)	2.29 T_{R} + 83.46 (±3.59)	2.05 T_{R} + 90.49 (±3.61)
Lt Tibia	2.43 T_{L} + 80.98 (±3.95)	2.18 T_{L} + 85.82 (±4.04)	2.36 T_{L} + 82.54 (±3.28)	2.42 T_{L} + 78.13 (±3.88)	1.95 T_{L} + 94.57 (±3.80)
Rt Fibula	2.57 F_{R} + 76.13 (±3.86)	2.38 F_{R} + 78.48 (±3.96)	2.39 F_{R} + 81.10 (±3.20)	2.56 F_{R} + 73.30 (±3.32)	2.09 F_{R} + 89.88 (±3.48)
Lt Fibula	2.59 F_{L} + 75.37 (±3.83)	2.29 F_{L} + 82.02 (±4.08)	2.40 F_{L} + 80.38 (±3.28)	2.44 F_{L} + 77.58 (±3.72)	2.16 F_{L} + 87.27 (±3.79)

=== Dupertuis and Hadden ===
The regression equations derived by Dupertuis and Hadden for Whites and Blacks to estimate the stature in centimeters from individual long bones and different combinations are given below. Probable errors are given within parentheses.

Bone	Male Whites	Female Whites	Male Blacks	Female Blacks
Femur	77.048 + 2.116 F (±0.2308)	62.872 + 2.322 F (±0.2256)	55.021 + 2.540 F (±0.2819)	54.235 + 2.498 F (±0.2419)
Tibia	92.766 + 2.178 T (±0.2436)	71.652 + 2.635 T (±0.2433)	72.123 + 2.614 T (±0.2983)	72.391 + 2.521 T (±0.2867)
Humerus	98.341 + 2.270 H (±0.3094)	56.287 + 3.448 H (±0.2762)	50.263 + 3.709 H (±0.2762)	69.978 + 3.035 H (±0.3189)
Radius	88.881 + 3.449 R (±0.2907)	68.238 + 4.248 R (±0.2963)	69.168 + 4.040 R (±0.3522)	74.906 + 3.761 R (±0.3277)
Femur & Tibia	84.898 + 1.072 (F + T) (±0.2508)	57.872 + 1.354 (F + T) (±0.2016)	52.702 + 1.411 (F + T) (±0.2485)	70.584 + 1.165 (F + T) (±0.2953)
Humerus & Radius	87.543 + 1.492 (H + R) (±0.2889)	42.386 + 2.280 (H + R) (±0.2134)	57.601 + 1.962 (H + R) (±0.3564)	61.982 + 1.866 (H + R) (±0.2926)
Femur & Tibia	76.201 + 1.330 F + 0.991 T (±0.2173)	60.377 + 1.472 F + 1.133 T (±0.2063)	54.438 + 1.615 F + 1.123 T (±0.2559)	52.989 + 2.112 F + 0.501 T (±0.2397)
Humerus & Radius	82.831 + 0.907 H + 2.474 R (±0.2835)	53.187 + 2.213 H + 1.877 R (±0.2632)	48.275 + 2.182 H + 2.032 R (±0.3251)	62.402 + 1.906 H + 1.796 R (±0.3082)
Femur & Humerus	78.261 + 2.129 F - 0.055 H (±0.2328)	55.179 + 1.835 F + 0.935 H (±0.1827)	48.802 + 2.175 F + 0.696 H (±0.2749)	55.103 + 2.517 F + 0.033 H (±0.2380)
Tibia & Radius	88.581 + 1.945 T + 0.524 R (±0.2385)	64.702 + 2.089 T + 1.169 R (±0.2328)	67.964 + 2.260 T + 0.689 R (±0.2964)	66.005 + 2.076 T + 0.952 R (±0.2832)
Femur, Tibia, Humerus & Radius	52.618 + 1.512 F + 0.927 T - 0.490 H + 1.386 R (±0.1582)	56.660 + 1.267 F + 0.992 T + 0.449 H + 0.164 R (±0.2068)	53.873 + 1.637 F + 1.101 T + 0.084 H - 0.093 R (±0.2626)	53.342 + 2.201 F + 0.359 T - 0.663 H + 0.930 R (±0.2365)

== Calculation of Stature from the measurement of Body Parts ==
Various studies have been undertaken into methods to device the estimation of stature from foot prints, measurement of severed body parts etc.
