= Terry Collection =

Collection of human skeletons

The Robert J. Terry Anatomical Skeletal Collection is a collection of some 1,728 human skeletons held by the Department of Anthropology of the National Museum of Natural History of the Smithsonian Institution, Washington, D.C., United States. The skeletons have been widely used in research for anthropology and forensic science.

== Background ==
It was created by Robert J. Terry (1871–1966) during his time as professor of anatomy and head of the Anatomy Department at Washington University Medical School in St. Louis, Missouri from 1899 until his retirement in 1941. It was transferred to its present holders in 1967. The Terry Collection is composed of skeletons that Terry collected from the Medical School's Gross Anatomy classes during his tenure at Washington University. The majority of the remains that make up the collection came from local hospitals in the St. Louis area, as well as institutional morgues. The remains obtained from these hospitals and institutions were those of individuals who had not been claimed by relatives, effectively making the remains the property of the state. The state of Missouri decided to donate the bodies to the medical school rather than spend taxpayer money to bury them.

The collection is an important source for anthropological research because of the extensive documentation that accompanies each skeleton. Terry attempted to collect data such as morgue records, dental charts, bone inventory forms, and anthropometric and anthroposcopic forms for the majority of the skeletons in the collection. Although methods of data collection changed over the years that the collection was being amassed, the same basic information was consistently collected. This information includes name, sex, age, race, cause of death, date of death, morgue or institution of origin, permit number, and various dates and records that pertain to embalming and processing of the cadaver. Terry also collected other resources for some of the individuals in the collection such as photographs or photo negatives of cadavers, plaster death masks, hair samples, and skin samples. The skin samples, however, had to be disposed of when the Anatomy building underwent renovations in the 1960s and the room they were stored in was removed.

== Research using the Terry Collection ==
There have been considerable amounts of research performed utilizing the skeletal remains within the Robert J. Terry collection. Much of this research has centered around attempts to create new methods of determining biological profile (height, age, sex, and ancestry) from an individual's skeletal remains. Some of the more prominent studies have included ones such as Mildred Trotter and Goldine Gleser's stature estimation from the long bones of American Whites and Negroes, Giles and Elliot's cranial measurements for determining ancestry and sex, Işcan's ancestry determination using the pelvis, DiBennardo and Taylor's method of sex and ancestry assessment utilizing the pelvis and femur, which was later expanded upon by Işcan and Cotton, who included the tibia in the analysis. Other, more modern, studies using the Terry Collection have continued to focus on estimation of sex, ancestry, and stature as well. These include the attempt to estimate sex from the posterior portion of the ilium by Novak, Schultz, and McIntyre, Kindschuh, Dupras, and Cowgill's approach for estimating ancestry utilizing the hyoid, and Albanese's use of the clavicle, humerus, radius, and ulna to estimate sex.

These studies have contributed greatly to the field of anthropology, especially forensic anthropology and bioarchaeology, in that many of the earlier methods, such as Trotter and Gleser's stature estimation formula, are still utilized today in conjunction with more modern methods to assess biological profile of skeletal remains. It is the well documented, and highly detailed, nature of the Terry Collection that has allowed for successful development of these methodologies which are still utilized today. It is this same nature that perpetuates continued use of the Terry Collection for research into skeletal biology and pathology, thus leading to development of more successful methodologies for assessing biological profile and pathological affects on the human skeleton.

The Terry Collection has also contributed to the construction of the Forensic Anthropology Data Bank (FDB), which is large digital database of skeletal measurements taken from various cases since its establishment in 1986. A number of African-American skeletal measurements from the Terry Collection were contributed to the FDB. The FDB is the main data pool that the computer program FORDISC utilizes in order to estimate sex, stature, and ancestry from specific skeletal measurements. FORDISC is primarily utilized in forensic applications, but may be applied to any skeletal measurements providing that they are diagnostic in nature, such as measurements of the skull and long bones.

=== Forensic anthropological research ===
As mentioned above, numerous studies have utilized the Robert J. Terry Collection for research and development of skeletal identification techniques. A vast majority have been aimed at advancing forensic anthropology and its methodologies for identification through various aspects of skeletal anatomy. One of the most well known of these studies was performed by Mildred Trotter and Goldine Gleser in 1952. Trotter and Gleser utilized the Terry Collection to create stature estimation formulas for American Whites and Negroes utilizing the long bones of the arm (humerus, radius, and ulna) and of the leg (femur, tibia, and fibula). This was achieved by taking measurements of all of the aforementioned bones and creating regression formulas from the taken measurements. The result was a number of formulas that allow for accurate estimation of the living stature of both American White and African-American males and females from dry bone.

Another well known study that utilized the Terry Collection to create forensic identification methods was the assessment of race/ancestry using the pelvis performed by Mehmet Yaşar Işcan. His study utilized 400 individuals from the Terry collection that encompassed both White and African American male and female pelves of known age and race/ancestry. Measurements of the pelves were taken while they were in articulated form, and then analyzed to determine if successful estimation of race/ancestry was possible. Results indicated that there was the possibility of an 88 percent correct assessment, and that race/ancestry assessment of female pelves was easier than that of male pelves. It was, however, cautioned to use these results carefully due to the fact that a large number of the remains were of low socioeconomic status and of unknown nutritional health.

=== Bioarchaeological Research ===
While bioarchaeology benefits from the methodologies that have been developed by forensic anthropological research using the Terry Collection, there are other studies that take a solely bioarchaeological focus. While not nearly as numerous as the forensic studies, they provide a different aspect to and use of the Robert J. Terry Anatomical Collection. Such studies have been conducted by Kristina Killgrove, who aimed at determining biodistance of Native American populations on the North Carolina Coastal Plain and utilized 52 individuals (26 White males and 26 White females) from the Terry Collection as a control group for comparison against the Native American data that was processed.

Further bioarchaeological research using the Terry Collection was performed by Kristrina Schuler and J. Alyssa White of Auburn University in Alabama. Their research focused on reconstructing body mass from skeletal remains and used a sample of 60 individuals (30 males and 30 females) from the Terry Collection in order to make these assessments. They opted to use the Terry Collection because of its highly controlled collection of living weight for many donors.

== Potential issues for modern use ==
While the Robert J. Terry Anatomical Collection has proven to be an excellent source for research in the field of anthropology, specifically forensic anthropology and bioarchaeology, the collection is now over 100 years old and no modern remains have been added. This has raised questions about the collection's applicability to modern populations when compared to collections such as the William Bass Donated Skeletal Collection where modern skeletal remains are still being added to the collection. This is thought to raise problems due to the secular changes that are taking place in American populations. It has been demonstrated that clear secular changes have taken place in North America over the last 100–125 years. This has implications for the applicability of studies utilizing the Terry Collection because these changes could impede the ability to make generalizations that are applicable to modern society from these remains since population statistics are not the same today as they were when the collection was being amassed. It was found, however, that the Robert J. Terry Collection and the William Bass Donated Skeletal Collection only have significant differences between age-at-death and year of birth for individuals in the collection, therefore indicating that the more modern remains in the Terry Collection are still applicable to modern research. There were potential secular differences noted in the males of the Terry collection, however. Females had less significant secular differences when compared to males, and while none of these changes were found to be present in large quantities it does indicate that secular change could be beginning to affect skeletal morphology, specifically that of males. Further research utilizing the Terry Collection, specifically utilizing those individuals born before 1890, is required to determine if these changes are significant and what may be causing them.

== See also ==
- FORDISC
- Hamann-Todd Collection at the Cleveland Museum of Natural History
- For demographic and postcraniometric databases, go to: https://smithsonian.figshare.com/articles/Terry_Collection_data/11412846
