= Dos Erres massacre =

1982 government killing of civilians in El Petén, Guatemala

Coordinates: 16°47′N 90°07′W

- Part of the Guatemalan Civil War and the Guatemalan genocide
- Dos Erres massacre (Guatemala)
- Location: Dos Erres, Guatemala
- Date: 6–8 December 1982; 43 years ago
- Target: Civilians of Dos Erres
- Attack type: Massacre
- Deaths: 200+
- Perpetrator: Kaibiles
- Convicted: Carlos Antonio Carias López; Daniel Martínez Martínez; Reyes Collin Gualip; Manuel Pop; Pedro Pimentel Ríos; (all sentenced to 6,060 years); Jorge Sosa; Gilberto Jordan; (both sentenced 10 years on immigration fraud charges in the United States)

The Dos Erres massacre of 6 December 1982 took place in Dos Erres, a small village in the municipality of La Libertad, in the northern Petén department of Guatemala. The name of the village, occasionally given as "Las Dos Erres", literally means "two Rs", originating from two brothers called Ruano who received the original land grant.

On 6 December 1982, when General Efraín Ríos Montt was the head of state of Guatemala, over 200 people were killed in Dos Erres by commandos working as government forces as a part of the government's scorched earth policy, in which up to 200,000 Indigenous and Mayan people died.

In December 2011, President Álvaro Colom made a formal apology for the massacre on behalf of the Guatemalan government. Months later, four soldiers were sentenced to 6,060 years prison for their part in the massacre. In March 2012, a fifth soldier, Pedro Pimentel Ríos, was sentenced to 6,060 years in prison for his participation in the events. In fall 2013, Jorge Vinicio Sosa Orantes, "one of the lieutenants" of the commandos, was found guilty of immigration fraud in a court in California and sentenced to 10 years in prison. Another soldier who later became a naturalized American, Gilberto Jordan, had been found guilty of naturalization fraud in September 2010. He also received a 10-year sentence, and has since been deported to Guatemala.

== Background ==
Dos Erres was located within the Peten department of Guatemala, a region which had been out of the grasp of Guatemala's central government up until the late 1950s, following the coup d’état of 1954. The coup d'état would see a revolving door of military governments, who were backed by the United States, that would undo much of the agricultural reforms achieved from the revolution of 1944. As part of some of these new measures, it was important for the military governments to explore and colonize regions that were rural and Indigenous. Departments like the Peten had historically been out of reach from the arms of the Guatemalan government, impacts from historical events such as the nation's independence and even the 1944 revolution had not reached the region due to its remote and scarce population.

In 1959, as part of these colonizing measures, the government established the National Enterprise of Promotion and Economic Development of the Peten (Spanish: Empresa Nacional de Fomento y Desarrollo Economico del Peten, FYDEP). Under FYDEP, the Guatemalan government increased their presence in the Peten region through the construction of infrastructure and economic development, particularly creating industry through lumber, livestock, and agriculture. In addition, the developments of the Guatemalan government would see the Peten Department's population grow, from 27,740 in 1964 to 131,927 in 1981. As part of these colonizing and economic development efforts, the government of Guatemala and the FYDEP began to give land grants to certain individuals to build villages and subsequent crop fields to help with these efforts. In 1971, Don Federico Aquino Ruano, mayor of the nearby village of Las Cruces, would be given a parcel of land of about 3300 acres by the FYDEP. In turn, Don Ruano would give that land to Don Marcos Reyes, land which would eventually become the village of Dos Erres. Throughout the next decade, tens of families would arrive in Dos Erres to work the nearby land growing various crops along with usual corn and beans, as well as build their lives within the village. Much of the village consisted of just a schoolhouse, two churches, the well, and various parcels of land that made up the homes of the families of Dos Erres. The community was small, with many of the families often socializing every Sunday after church and celebrating major festivals or holidays in the village center. The schoolhouse and soccer field were popular places for the children, and along with these locations included stores owned by the locals which were the sources of a couple of supplies. Dos Erres was in a remote part away from any major highways, located deep in the jungle between the villages of Las Cruces and La Libertad. By 1982, 65 families called Dos Erres their home.

In addition to the growing and developing department of the Peten, the region would also soon find itself within the middle of the Guatemalan Civil War, a conflict which had broken out in 1960 after leftist guerillas revolted against the Guatemalan military who still held much of the power. In 1967, a series of defeats for the guerillas would see them make a scramble to the North to regroup and reestablish themselves, however, following more defeats as they tried to march on, certain groups found themselves inhabiting the region of the southern Peten. Through the 1970s, members of the Rebel Armed Forces (Spanish: Fuerzas Armadas Rebeldes, FAR) found themselves within the Peten, and through this decade began to unarm themselves and move away from a military guerilla to a political organization. FAR would achieve much of the work through labor struggles, helping unions, workers’ organizations, and workers themselves in urban centers such as Guatemala City and rural regions such as the department of the Peten. It was here that FAR beginning to reach out to many of the rural peasantry of the Peten, talking about messages which resulted in gaining support for the efforts, efforts centered on their guerilla ideals of overthrowing the rich and helping the poor through military operations. For the FAR, they would resume fighting on the frontlines by 1979.

For the Guatemalan government, the defeats of guerillas in the 1960s proved to be successful in trying to combat the communist threat, but in the early 1970s, officials from the United States began to look for methods to improve the standing and fighting prowess of the Guatemalan army. Military leaders from Guatemala received advice and attended the United States’ School of the Americas to make the country's armed forces a stronger combatant against any guerilla insurgencies. While that mission proved successful for the United States’ mission of hemispheric hegemony against communist threats, the Guatemalan army became effective to such a degree that the United States became concerned with the army's ruthlessness. Throughout the 1970s, the Guatemalan army would carry out numerous operations that would bring into question the country's human rights record. The army, under President Lucas Garcia, was particularly ruthless throughout the late 1970s and early 1980s with strategies that had no regard for civilian lives, and soon sanctions and pressure arose from the United States to put a stop to it. In 1982, General Efrain Rios Montt conducted a successful coup for the presidency of Guatemala, who at the beginning cooperated with American desires to quell the army and restore some order. However, while it seemed that Rios Montt would abide by these requests, it would be under his leadership that the Guatemalan army would carry out some of its most ruthless campaigns. Through just five months of Rios Montt's leadership, hundreds of thousands of Indigenous peasants, particularly Mayan, would disappear in what many now know as genocidal actions carried out by the Rios Montt government throughout the country. These massacres included the Dos Erres massacre, Río Negro massacre, Plan de Sánchez massacre, and many more. Carrying out most of these acts was the Guatemalan army's group of special forces, known as the Kaibiles, a group described as ruthless killers, whose training regimen instilled in many young men the idea to become a killing machine for the state. The Kaibiles would become the government's principal arm in carrying out what is now known as Rios Montt's “Scorched Earth” policy. With the ever- evasive guerilla forces, the army would burn down and kill entire villages through the Guatemalan countryside, believing they only way to defeat the guerilla forces was to destroy what was believed to be bases or groups sympathetic to the guerilla's cause.

== The Massacre of December 1982 ==
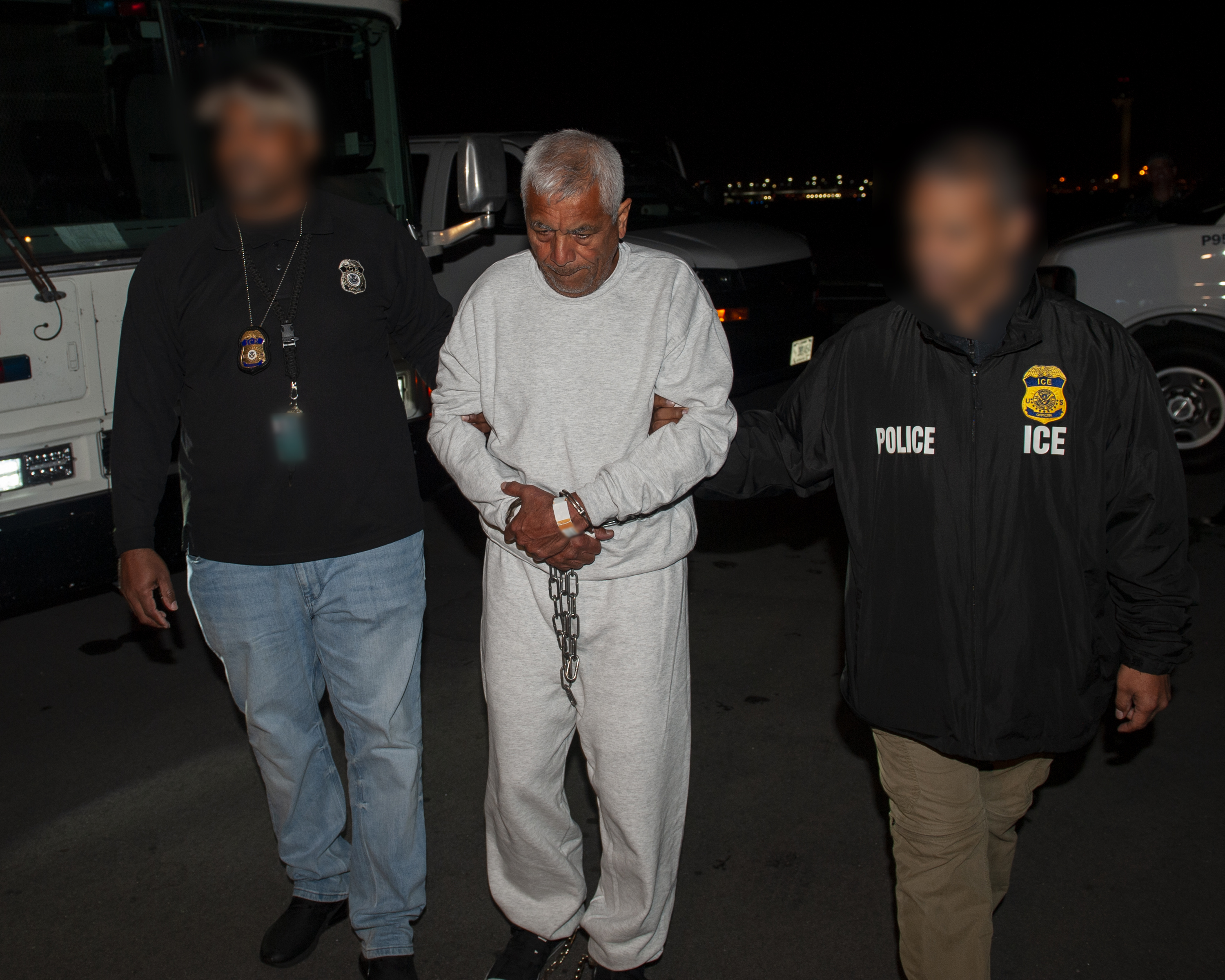
A former member of the Guatemalan army who is wanted for participating in the Dos Erres being removed by officers with U.S. Immigration and Customs Enforcement’s (ICE) Enforcement and Removal Operations (ERO) in Miami

By 1981, guerilla fighters in Guatemala had occupied the region that surrounded Dos Erres, in turn, the Guatemalan government would send a continuous flow of armed troops into the area to extinguish their presence, making much of the region an active warzone. On October 10, 1982, FAR guerrillas ambushed an army convoy near Palestina, in the vicinity of Dos Erres, about 18 miles from the village. 22 soldiers were killed in the ambush and the guerillas made away with 22 Galil rifles and M79 grenade launchers. The response from high-ranking officials of the Guatemalan army to the ambush was to carry out a “punishment” for inhabitants who lived within the vicinity of the ambush. On 4 December, a contingent of 58 Kaibiles (the elite special forces commandos of the Guatemalan Army) was flown into the area. The following day, they received orders to disguise themselves as guerrillas, deploy to Dos Erres and kill the inhabitants, who were considered guerrilla sympathizers. Dressed as guerrillas, the Kaibiles arrived in the hamlet at 02:30 hrs on 6 December. They forced the inhabitants out of their homes, corralling the men in the schoolhouse and the women and children in the hamlet's two churches. A subsequent search uncovered no sign of weapons or guerrilla propaganda. At 06:00, officers consulted superiors by radio, then informed the commandos they would be "vaccinating" the inhabitants after breakfast.

In the early afternoon, the Kaibiles separated out the children, and began killing them. They raped women and girls, and ripped the fetuses out of pregnant women. They bashed the smallest children's heads against walls and trees, and killed the older ones with hammer blows to the head. A baby was the first to be killed, by dumping the baby live into a deep 4 meter well, along with the rest of the bodies then after. Then the commandos interrogated the men and women one by one, raped some of the women again, then shot or bashed them with the hammer, and dumped them in the well. The massacre continued throughout 7 December. On the morning of 8 December, as the Kaibiles were preparing to leave, another 15 persons, among them children, arrived in the hamlet. With the well already full, they took the newcomers to a location half an hour away, then shot all but two of them. They kept two teenage girls for the next few days, raping them repeatedly and finally strangling them. Only one person survived this massacre, a small child who managed to escape.

== Aftermath ==
Following the events of the massacre, family members of the victims who lived in the nearby village of Las Cruces began immediately pressing for questions from the local police. At first, the officer in charge, Carlos Carias, would tell family members that the army was doing an investigation, and that everything was fine. He would also say things that the army was doing a register of people, and there was nothing to worry about. Throughout the next few days, Carias would contradict himself, changing his story to the victims, mocking the victims, and threatening them if they continued to ask for the whereabouts of their loved ones. It wouldn't be until that Thursday after the massacre, December 9, that Carias would organize a caravan to bring relatives to the village. What they found was a mess, as animals ran rampant through the village, clothes scattered everywhere, documents flying in the wind, it was clear that something major had occurred to some of the family members. Many felt numb and angry, and Carias and his men openly mocked more of the victims for coming to the village. Carias would again continue to threaten more of the family members if they began pressing more questions once they arrived at the village. Under the guise that guerillas could occupy the homes and in accordance with Rios Montt's “scorched earth” policy, Carias and his men warned the family members to gather all the belongings they could, as they would burn all the homes in the village down. While it became clear that something had occurred, many of the family members still had no idea where their relatives were at, or where their remains might be located.

== FAMDEGUA and the Location of the Victims ==
It would not be until 1995, with the help of Aura Elena Farfan’s FAMDEGUA (Families of Detained and Disappeared of Guatemala; Spanish: Familiares de Detenidos y Desaparecidos de Guatemala) organization and the Argentine Team of Forensic Anthropology (Spanish: Equipo Argentino de Antropologia Forensica) that the remains of the Dos Erres Massacre victims would be located. With the help of some of the family members of victims and testimonies of those who committed the acts, it was quickly determined that many of the remains laid in the village's main well. After 4 months of excavation, 162 skeletal remains were retrieved from the well, of which about 41% were children who were younger than 12 years old. With this information, Farfan and FAMDEGUA presented these findings to the Inter-American Commission of Human Rights in 1996, which at that point began a series of judicial proceedings that would ultimately lead to the conviction of many of the parties responsible for the events of the Dos Erres Massacre. By 2009, the Inter-American Court of Human Rights accepted that the Guatemalan State had committed various human rights abuses, and the that remains of victims be identified to present to the families.

== Judicial proceedings ==
In 1994, a case was presented in Guatemala to investigate and bring to trial those responsible for the massacre. However, the case remained paralyzed in Guatemala's justice system and showed no signs of progress.

In 2000, President Alfonso Portillo admitted government responsibility for the massacre. He acknowledged the deaths of 226 victims at the hands of state agents, asked for forgiveness on behalf of the state, and presented survivors' groups with a cheque totaling US$1.82 million.

In 2009, the IACHR held that the amnesty law of 1996 did not apply to the most serious crimes committed during the civil war. This was followed by investigations in the United States against people suspected of involvement in the massacre. In May 2010, Gilberto Jordan, naturalized American and former member of the Kaibiles special forces, was accused of involvement in the massacre and arrested in Florida by U.S. Immigration and Customs officers. On 16 September 2010, after his role in the massacre was established in a Miami court, Jordan was convicted for naturalization fraud and sentenced to 10 years in prison.

In January 2011, Jorge Vinicio Orantes Sosa, another former Kaibil member suspected to be involved in the massacre, was arrested in Alberta on charges of lying to immigration authorities. In September 2011, US authorities formally requested Sosa's extradition from Canada to the United States to face charges of making a false statement and unlawful procurement of citizenship, with regards to his arrival from Guatemala to the United States a few years after the massacre. Sosa, who holds both Canadian and American citizenship is also wanted by Guatemalan authorities. On 21 September 2012, Canada extradited Sosa to the United States, where he stood trial for immigration fraud. He was found guilty and received a 10-year sentence. Sosa also had his US citizenship revoked. He was released from prison on 26 July 2019. Sosa is now residing in Canada, and has yet to be deported.

On 25 July 2011, the office of Attorney General Claudia Paz y Paz began a trial in Guatemala City against four former soldiers of the Kaibiles special forces accused of participating in the massacre. On 2 August 2011, a court found the four soldiers, Manuel Pop, Reyes Collin Gualip, Daniel Martínez Hernández and Lieutenant Carlos Carías guilty of the massacre. They were each sentenced to over 6,000 years in prison.

On 12 March 2012, Pedro Pimentel Rios was sentenced to a symbolic 6,060 years in prison for his part in the massacre. On 25 May 2012, the American public radio show This American Life aired an episode entitled "What Happened at Dos Erres" which covered the story of a survivor of the massacre, Oscar Ramirez. It was based on a series of articles by ProPublica, which later served as the basis for a 2016 documentary called Finding Oscar.

A sixth former soldier, Santos Lopez, was convicted of killing 171 people during the massacre. He was sentenced in November 2018 to a symbolic 5,160 years in prison. Among those who testified against him was Ramiro Osorio Cristales, who was 5 years old when his family was murdered during the massacre. Lopez subsequently kidnapped and raised Cristales in an abusive household for the next 13 years. Cristales eventually escaped and sought asylum in Canada, where he currently resides.

On 3 March 2020, Gilberto Jordan, 64, was removed by officers with U.S. Immigration and Customs Enforcement's (ICE) Enforcement and Removal Operations (ERO) in Miami. Gilberto Jordan, arrived in Guatemala escorted by ERO officers. Upon arrival, Jordan was immediately turned over to Guatemalan law enforcement officials.
