= Karen Ramey Burns =

American forensic anthropologist

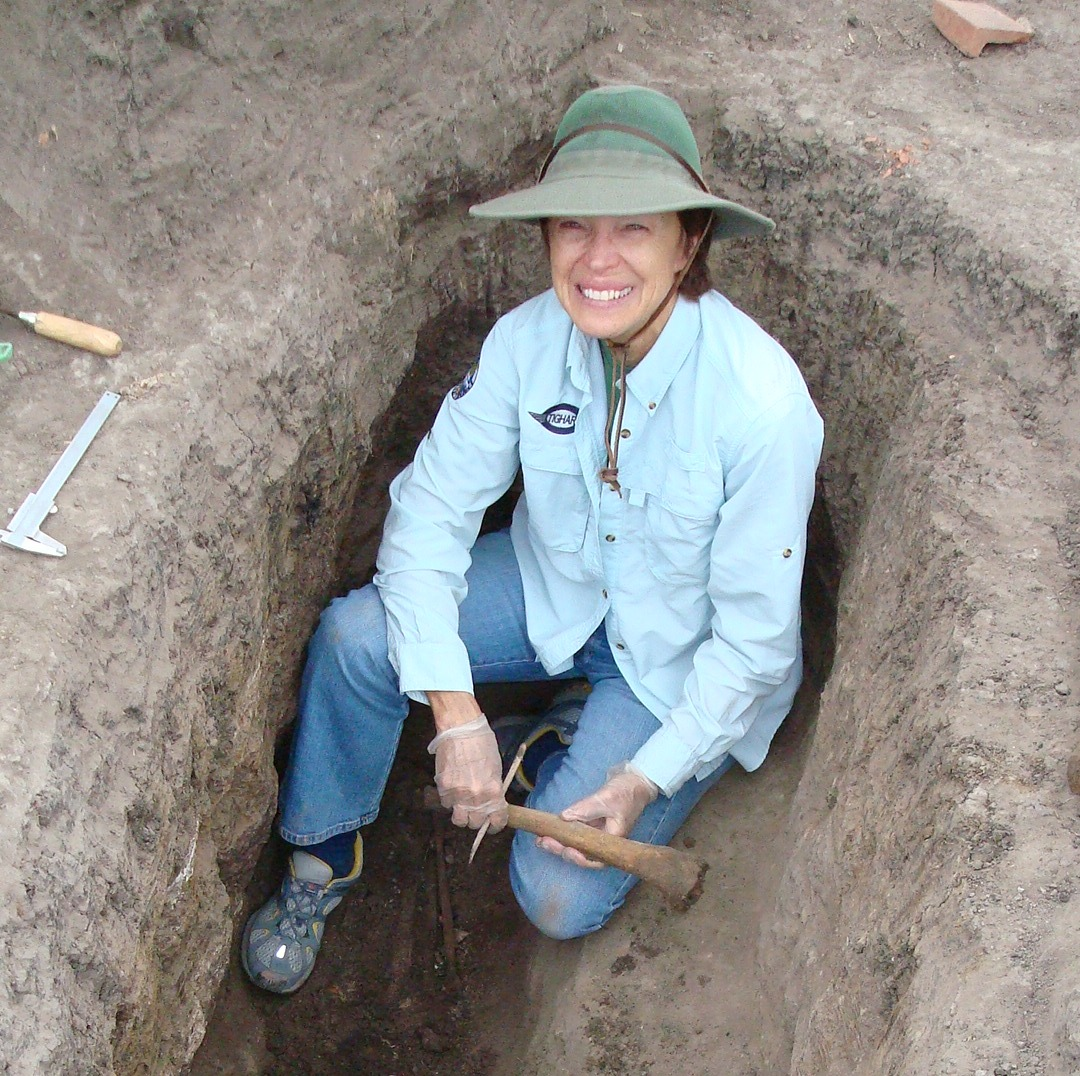
- Education: University of Florida
- Known for: Her work in international human rights
- Awards: Fulbright Scholar
- Scientific career
- Fields: forensic anthropologist
- Doctoral advisor: William R. Maples

Karen Ramey Burns was an American forensic anthropologist known for work in international human rights. Her specialty was the recovery and identification of human remains in criminal, historical, archaeological, and disaster-related circumstances. She worked on a number of high-profile cases, including the Raboteau Massacre and trial in Haiti, the Río Negro massacre in Guatemala, victims of genocide in Iraqi Kurdistan, the Amelia Earhart search in Kiribati, Fiji, and the Northern Mariana Islands, and the identification of the Kazimierz Pułaski remains in Savannah, Georgia, United States. She was also active in international forensic training and taught human osteology and forensic anthropology at the University of Utah in Salt Lake City. she also was worked on identifying victims of 9/11. She was a 2007–08 Fulbright Scholar at the University of the Andes in Bogotá, Colombia, where she also worked with EQUITAS, a non-governmental organization dedicated to helping families of disappeared persons due to the ongoing Colombian conflict.

Burns received her graduate education in forensic anthropology under the direction of the late William R. Maples at the University of Florida and developed experience in major crime laboratory procedures while working for the Georgia Bureau of Investigation, Division of Forensic Sciences. She was a fellow of the American Academy of Forensic Sciences.

She died on January 7, 2012.

== Selected works ==
- Burns, K R (1999, 2007), Forensic Anthropology Training Manual
- Burns, K R (1991) "Protocol for Disinterment and Analysis of Skeletal Remains," in the Manual for the Effective Prevention and Investigation of Extra-Legal, Arbitrary, and Summary Executions, a United Nations publication.
- King, T F, R S Jacobson, K R Burns, and K Spading (2001) Amelia Earhart’s Shoes, Is the Mystery Solved?
