= Guatemalan Forensic Anthropology Foundation =

Non-governmental organisation

The Guatemalan Forensic Anthropology Foundation (Spanish: Fundación de Antropología Forense de Guatemala, or FAFG) is an autonomous, non-profit, technical and scientific non-governmental organisation. Its aim is to strengthen the administration of justice and respect for human rights by investigating, documenting, and raising awareness about past instances of human rights violations, particularly unresolved murders, that occurred during Guatemala's 30-year-long Civil War.

Its main tool in pursuing this goal is the application of forensic anthropology techniques in exhumations of clandestine mass graves. Its endeavours in this regard allow the relatives of the disappeared to recuperate the remains of their missing family members and to proceed with burials in accordance with their beliefs, and enable criminal prosecutions to be brought against the perpetrators.

== History ==
In 1990 and 1991, various groups of survivors began to report to the authorities the existence of clandestine graves in their communities, most of which contained the bodies of Maya campesinos massacred during the "scorched earth" policy pursued by the government in the early 1980s. The forensic services of the Guatemalan judiciary began to investigate some of these cases, but they failed to pursue them to their conclusion.

Consequently, in 1991, the survivors' groups contacted Dr. Clyde Snow, a renowned U.S. forensic anthropologist who had previously overseen exhumations in Argentina in the wake of that country's Dirty War and had helped found the Argentine Forensic Anthropology Team.

Snow arrived in Guatemala, accompanied by forensic anthropologists from Argentina and Chile, and began the dual task of conducting the first exhumations and training the future members of the Guatemalan Forensic Anthropology Team (Equipo de Antropología Forense de Guatemala).

The Team was supported in its early years by a donation from the American Association for the Advancement of Science of the United States, and its first director was Stefan Schmitt, who has since worked on exhumations in Rwanda and Former Yugoslavia. In July 1992 the EAFG carried out its first field project at San José Pachó Lemoa in El Quiché department.

The Team was restyled as a "Foundation" in 1997. That same year, the Historical Clarification Commission (Guatemala's truth and reconciliation commission, set up as a part of the peace accords that ended the armed conflict) asked it to conduct four field investigations in order to secure physical evidence to back up the testimony it had heard from survivors; this evidence was included in the commission's final report, Guatemala: Memory of Silence. By October 2004, the FAFG had investigated a total of 349 clandestine burial sites and had recovered 2,982 sets of human remains.

The current director of the FAFG is Fredy Peccerelli.

In 2023, Peccerelli offered to help locate graves associated with the Canadian Indian residential school system.

== See also ==
- Guatemalan Civil War
- Fredy Peccerelli (FAFG Director)
