= Grupo de Apoyo Mutuo =

Guatemalan organization

Grupo de Apoyo Mutuo (Mutual Support Group--GAM) is a Guatemalan human rights organization. It was founded in June 1984 by a group of Guatemalan women who were searching for their loved ones who were Desaparecidos, or forcibly disappeared, during the Guatemalan Civil War from 1960 to 1996. The main goal of GAM is to bring together the families of people who were forcibly disappeared and to seek justice for people who disappeared. The GAM was nominated to receive a Nobel Peace Prize in 1986. The group received the Carter–Menil Human Rights Prize in 1986. The 2011 documentary The Eco del Dolor de Mucha Gente tells the story of the founding of GAM and the violence and threats they faced.

Several of the women who founded GAM include Nineth Montenegro, Aura Elena Farfán, Rosario Cuevas, Sara Poroj, and others. Due to the many threats to the group, members received international accompaniment from Peace Brigades International and support from Amnesty International. The group is currently led by Mario Polanco.

Since 2017, GAM has had a collaboration with Haverford College Libraries. The relationship between GAM and Haverford College Libraries began when a Haverford professor and GAM met while researching in Guatemala. Both parties shared a common interest in preserving GAM's archive and they quickly collaborated. Haverford has begun to fund projects for students in collaboration with GAM. These projects have taken on a variety of forms, including research on nonviolent resistance efforts taken by the GAM, the voices of women and mothers in the archive, and a process of demographic analysis to depict who is in the archive, among others.
