= Argentine Forensic Anthropology Team =

Argentine scientific non-governmental organisation

Argentine Forensic Anthropology Team (EAAF)
- Equipo Argentino de Antropología Forense
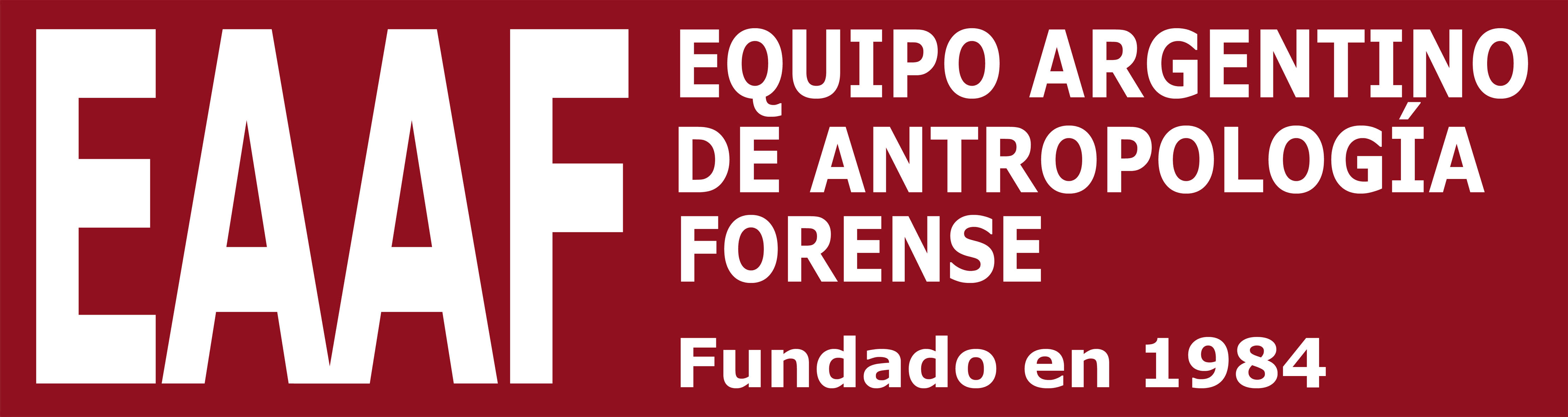
- Headquarters: Buenos Aires, Córdoba, New York City
- Fields: forensic anthropology
- Website: https://eaaf.org/

The Argentine Forensic Anthropology Team (Spanish: Equipo Argentino de Antropología Forense, EAAF) is an Argentine not-for-profit scientific non-governmental organisation. It was created in 1986 at the initiative of various human rights organisations with the aim of developing forensic anthropology techniques to help locate and identify the Argentines who had disappeared during the "Dirty War" period of the 1976–1983 military dictatorship. Since then, the Team's members have conducted field work in 30 other countries, including El Salvador (including exhumations at El Mozote), Guatemala, Bosnia and Herzegovina, Angola, Timor-Leste, French Polynesia, Croatia and South Africa. In particular, the EAAF acquired additional worldwide renown uncovering the massacre by government forces at El Mozote in El Salvador and by identifying the remains of Ernesto "Che" Guevara, found in Bolivia.

== Origins ==
With the restoration of democracy and the creation of the National Commission on the Disappearance of Persons (CONADEP) in 1983, Argentina embarked on a process of exhumations of the many unmarked graves found in the country, believing that many of them could well contain unidentified victims of forced disappearances — an undertaking in which it soon became apparent that scientific methods were needed. CONADEP and the Grandmothers of the Plaza de Mayo took the initiative and travelled to the United States, where they were vouchsafed the determined support of the American Association for the Advancement of Science.

A genetic database was created at Durand Hospital in Buenos Aires, and a team of forensic anthropologists was created under the leadership of Dr. Clyde Snow. Those small beginnings were the basis for the creation in 1986 of the Argentine Forensic Anthropology Team.

== Work ==
The EAAF's investigation methods were divided into three stages:

1. Preliminary phase, collecting written and oral accounts of the disappeared.
2. Analysis phase, studying documents and records in order to identify the possible whereabouts of the remains
3. Archaeological phase, similar to classical archaeology within a forensic context. This phase also used genetic investigation techniques based on DNA testing.

The EAAF was a pioneer in developing these techniques. In the words of Clyde Snow:

"For the first time in the history of human rights investigations we began to use a scientific method to investigate violations. Although we started out small, it led to a genuine revolution in how human rights violations are investigated. The idea of using science in the human rights area began here, in Argentina, and it is now used throughout the world. The Team took the idea to other parts of the world and helped set up teams in other countries, such as Guatemala, Chile, and Peru. European countries now have their forensic anthropology teams. But Argentina was the first."

By 2000 the EAAF had succeeded in identifying sixty sets of remains, while a further 300 cases were still under investigation. In 2012, the EAAF identified the remains of Ana Teresa Diego, who had been abducted and killed by government forces in 1976 and was buried in a mass grave.

The EAAF co-operates with and assists other NGOs and investigations. For example, in 2017 it assisted the Expert Technical Group investigating the Bon Secours Mother and Baby Home in Tuam, Ireland, following the discovery of the bodies of up to 800 children buried in a mass grave, under the auspices of the Mother and Baby Homes Commission of Investigation.

== See also ==
- National Reorganisation Process
