= Michael Finnegan (anthropologist) =

- Born: Kansas, U.S.
- Occupation: Forensic anthropologist (retired)

Dr. Michael Finnegan is a retired professor of anthropology at Kansas State University and is one of the nation's leading forensic anthropology experts.

In 2005, he was named a Distinguished Fellow of the American Academy of Forensic Sciences. He holds a Ph.D. in Anthropology from the University of Colorado and held a postdoctoral fellowship at the Smithsonian Institution, studying paleopathology and non-metric variation for population studies and forensic science application. He is a Fellow and past Vice President of the American Academy of Forensic Sciences; a Diplomate, and past President, of the American Board of Forensic Anthropology, Inc.;and is a recipient of the "Kansas Attorney General's Certificate of Merit" in recognition of outstanding service rendered to law enforcement in and for the State of Kansas by a private citizen.

== Education and career ==
Finnegan published numerous articles on theory, method and application of osteological analysis in population studies and forensic applications. He has conducted research in Africa, Australia, the Middle East, Southeast Asia, and Europe, as well as various areas of North and South America. Dr. Finnegan is a recipient of the "William L. Stamey Teaching Award" in undergraduate instruction, the "John C. Hazelet Award" as the outstanding member of the Kansas Division of the International Association for Identification, the "Bartucz Lajos Award" from Jozsef Attila University and the "T. Dale Stewart Award" from the American Academy of Forensic Sciences.

Finnegan was elected to the American Academy of Forensic Sciences in 1976 and selected as a Fellow in 1978. He has served the academy in numerous capacities, including section representative on the board of directors and as vice president.

When he is called to a case, Finnegan determines the deceased's physical characteristics, establishes approximate time of death and keeps authorities informed of his progress. He has identified downed American pilots in Vietnam, dissidents in Eastern Europe and even Jesse James. Finnegan has lectured throughout the world. He also has been contacted for consultation by forensic labs worldwide.

He has published numerous articles on theory, method and application of osteological analysis in population studies and forensic applications.

Finnegan has received the Kansas Attorney General's Certificate of Merit in recognition of outstanding service rendered to law enforcement in and for the state of Kansas by a private citizen.

He has also received K-State's William L. Stamey Teaching Award in undergraduate instruction, the John C. Hazelet Award as an outstanding member of the Kansas Division of the International Association for Identification, the Bartucz Lajos Award from the University of Szeged, Hungary, the Outstanding Senior Scientist Award from Sigma Xi and the American Academy of Forensic Sciences Physical Anthropology Section's T. Dale Stewart Award.

He frequently participates in discussion panels at the Great Manhattan Mystery Conclave.

== Sources ==
- Michael Finnegan, Ph.D, D-ABFA
- http://www.mediarelations.k-state.edu/WEB/News/NewsReleases/finnegan31605.html
