= Mario Polanco =

Mario Polanco is a Guatemalan human rights activist. He is a founding member and, currently the Director of, the Grupo de Apoyo Mutuo (Mutual Support Group, or GAM) in Guatemala City, one of the country's oldest human rights organizations. He is married to Member of Congress Nineth Montenegro. Polanco has been the victim of numerous death threats and attacks on his life.
