= Clyde Snow =

American forensic anthropologist (1928–2014)

- Born: Theone; January 7, 1928; Fort Worth, Texas, US
- Died: May 16, 2014 (aged 86); Norman, Oklahoma, US
- Education: New Mexico Military Institute; Eastern New Mexico University; Texas Tech University (MS 1955); University of Arizona (PhD 1967)
- Employer(s): Federal Aviation Administration; University of Oklahoma

Clyde Snow (January 7, 1928 – May 16, 2014) was an American forensic anthropologist. Some of his skeletal confirmations include John F. Kennedy, victims of John Wayne Gacy, King Tutankhamun, victims of the Oklahoma City bombing, and Nazi doctor Josef Mengele.

== Biography ==
Snow was born in Fort Worth, Texas in 1928. He started his higher education at the New Mexico Military Institute where he earned an Associated Degree. He then flunked out of Southern Methodist University. After that, he attended Eastern New Mexico University to earn his Bachelor's Degree. His master's degree in Zoology was then earned at Texas Technical University. Finally, he attended University of Arizona and achieved his Ph.D. in Anthropology in 1967.

In 1968, Snow became the head of the department of Forensic Anthropology at Civil Aeromedical Institute. On September 25, 1978, Snow testified before the House Select Committee on Assassinations about various forensic aspects of the Kennedy assassination. He denied that E. Howard Hunt and Frank Sturgis were among the Three tramps found in a railroad car behind the Grassy Knoll. However, he also testified "[Hunt] has rather protruding ears and in later photographs, they have been brought back closer to his head" with plastic surgery. By 1972, the American Academy of Forensic Sciences recognized forensic work as a specialty of anthropology.

Since 1979, Snow turned his focus to forensics exclusively. He worked with various human rights groups and brought to attention mass graves of civilians in Argentina, and spent five years training many of the founding members of the Argentine Forensic Anthropology Team (Equipo Argentino de Antropología Forense, EAAF). So far, at least five officers in Argentina were convicted partially due to Snow's work in the mass graves. The success of this mission led to the creation of Guatemalan Forensic Anthropology Team as well when survivors of the Guatemalan Civil War sought his help in 1991.

In 1991, Snow traveled to San Vicente, Bolivia, to search for the remains of the American outlaws Butch Cassidy (Robert Leroy Parker) and the Sundance Kid (Harry Alonzo Longabaugh). However, the exact location of the grave was only known with an accuracy of several yards, and the grave excavated was found to contain the remains of a German miner named Gustav Zimmer. No remains were found whose DNA matched that of Parker and Longabaugh's families. The search was the subject of the British documentary Wanted - Butch Cassidy and the Sundance Kid, first shown April 22, 1993 in Channel 4's True Stories series.

In 1997, Snow worked on mass graves found in the territory of the former Yugoslavia. Snow also participated in a re-enactment of an excavation of Butch Masters in Illinois that aired on The Discovery Channel episode Science Detectives on Discover Magazine.

In 2004, Snow appeared on the Unsolved History documentary television series episode Hunting Nazis on The Discovery Channel.

As of 2005, Snow lived with his wife near Oklahoma City. He continued teaching at the University of Oklahoma, and he also did occasional lectures for Forensic Science organizations and law enforcement personnel.

Snow died May 16, 2014, aged 86, in Norman, Oklahoma. In accordance with his wishes, his ashes were scattered in Sector 134 of Avellaneda Cemetery in Buenos Aires, in Guatemala, and in Iraqi Kurdistan.
