= Edwin Escobar Hill =

Guatemalan entrepreneur, lecturer and politician

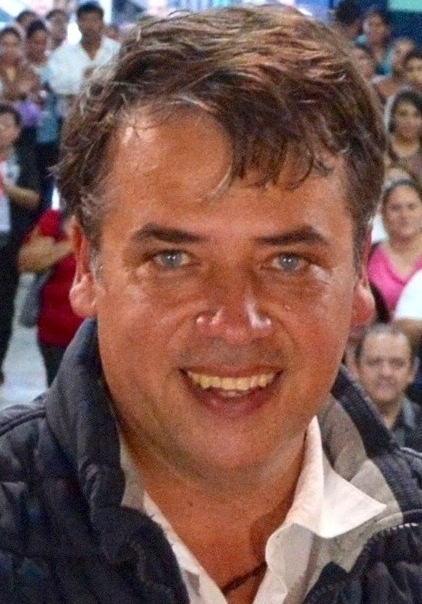

Mayor of Villa Nueva
- In office 15 January 2012 – 19 March 2019
- Deputy: Ricardo Ramazzini Gándara; María Teresa Gómez López
- Preceded by: Salvador Gándara Gaitán
- Succeeded by: Javier Gramajo

Personal details
- Born: Edwin Felipe Escobar Hill; 19 July 1969 (age 56) Villa Nueva, Guatemala
- Party: Citizen Prosperity (since 2018)
- Other political affiliations: CREO (2011–2012); PP (2012–2015); LIDER (2015–2016); Independent (2016–2018)
- Spouse: Ginna López (m. 2018)

Edwin Felipe Escobar Hill (born July 19, 1969) is a Guatemalan entrepreneur, lecturer and politician who has served as Mayor of Villa Nueva since January 15, 2012. He has also served as President of the National Association of Municipalities of the Republic of Guatemala since 2016.

Edwin Escobar was Dean of Engineering at Universidad Rafael Landívar from 2002 to 2005. During this time, he built TEC Landívar, which consists of 42 laboratories for students of different engineering studies at Universidad Rafael Landívar, Guatemala.

From 1996 to 2004, he was board member and director at “Juannio”, an annual charity art auctions event for the Neurological Institute of Guatemala, of which he also was board director from 2002 to 2004.

From 2008 to 2010, he hosted a TV talk show called "Construyendo Guatemala con Edwin Escobar" (Building Guatemala with Edwin Escobar), which aired on Canal Antigua.

In 2018, he announced that he would participate as a presidential candidate in the 2019 general election for Citizen Prosperity. On March 24, 2019, it was announced that Edwin Escobar would be officially running for President of Guatemala.

Political offices
Preceded by Salvador Gándara Gaitán	Mayor of Villa Nueva; 2012-present	Succeeded by Incumbent
