= Fredy Peccerelli =

Fredy Peccerelli (born 1971), a forensic anthropologist, is the director and one of the founding members of the Guatemalan Forensic Anthropology Foundation in Guatemala City, a nongovernmental organization that exhumes mass graves of victims of Guatemala's civil war. Peccerelli, along with members of his immediate family, has been the subject of repeated death threats as a result of his work.

In 1999, he was chosen by CNN and Time magazine as one of the "50 Latin American Leaders for the New Millennium".

In addition to his ongoing work in Guatemala, Peccerelli has conducted exhumations of mass graves in post-war Bosnia and Herzegovina. He testified about this work at the International Criminal Tribunal for the Former Yugoslavia on 13 March 2007.
