= Mildred Trotter =

American anthropologist

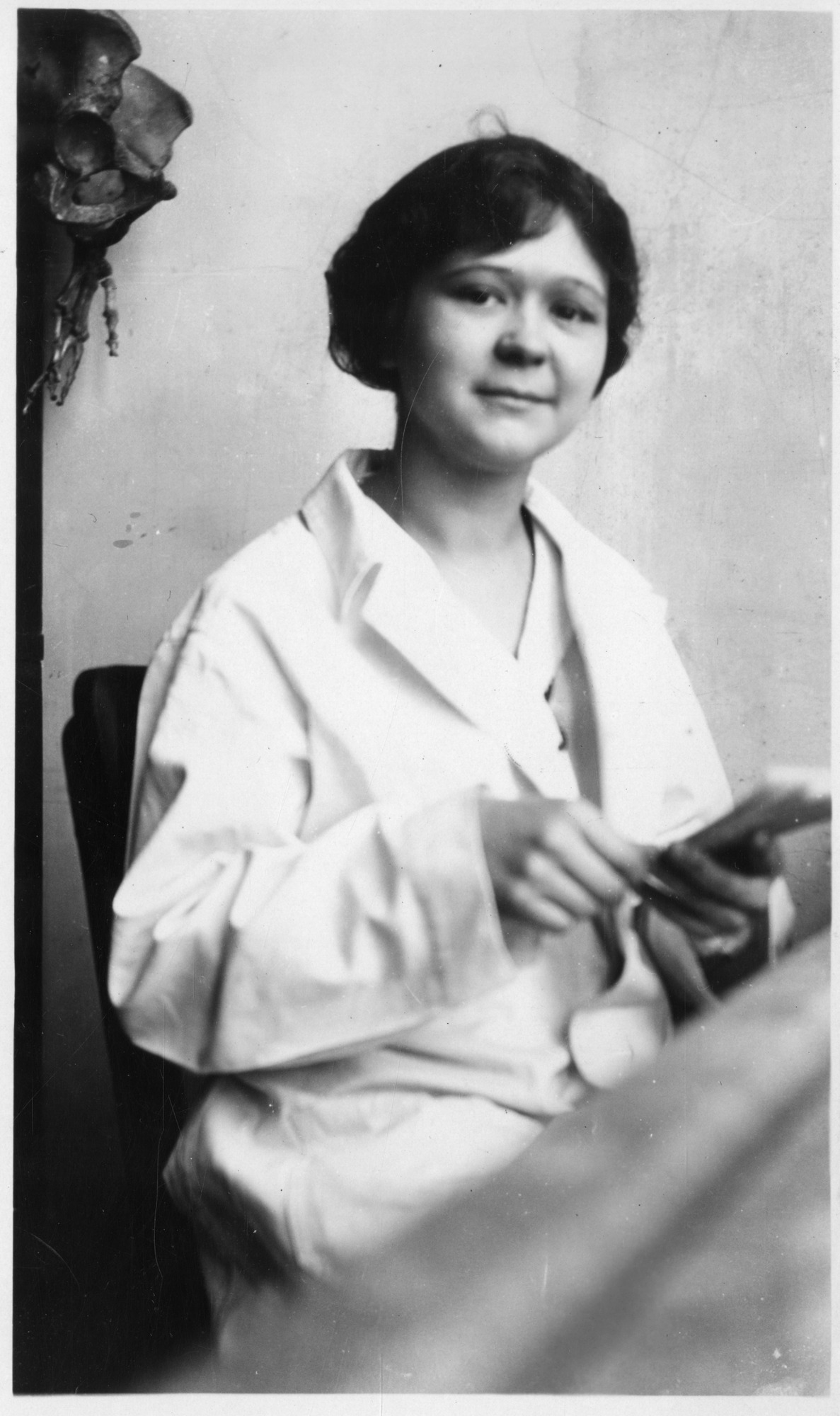
- Born: February 3, 1899; Monaca, Pennsylvania, U.S.
- Died: August 23, 1991 (aged 92)
- Education: Mount Holyoke College, Washington University in St. Louis, Oxford University
- Scientific career
- Fields: Forensic history and anthropology
- Workplaces: Washington University School of Medicine

Mildred Trotter (February 3, 1899 – August 23, 1991) was an American pioneer as a forensic historian and forensic anthropologist.

== Biography ==
Trotter was born in Monaca, Pennsylvania. She received her B.A. in zoology and physiology from Mount Holyoke College in 1920. She was hired by the Washington University in St. Louis as a fellow in Hypertrichiasis to assist in a research project on excessive hair growth in the School of Medicine and Department of Anatomy. Her work contributed to her degree. She received a Master's in 1921, and a Ph.D. in anatomy in 1924, whereupon she became an instructor of anatomy. She accepted a National Research Council Fellowship in Physical Anthropology for the 1925–26 academic year, and studied at Oxford University in England, with Arthur Thomson. As a result of this work, she published her first research paper on bone, "The Moveable Segments of the Vertebral Column in Old Egyptians".

She returned to Washington University School of Medicine the following year and was promoted to assistant professor by Robert J. Terry, the head of the Department of Anatomy. Four years later she received tenure and became an associate professor. In 1946, after complaining to the head of the Anatomy Department, E.V. Cowdry, and being evaluated by a committee, Trotter was finally promoted to full professor of Gross Anatomy, becoming the first woman to hold that rank at Washington University.

In 1948, Trotter was granted a 14-month leave of absence from Washington University, to work with the U.S. Army's Graves Registration Service, at the Central Identification Laboratory at Schofield Barracks in Hawaii. Her job was to help identify the remains of U.S. servicemen and servicewomen. Her laboratory identified 94 percent of the remains analyzed. Frustrated with the lack of recorded data for predicting height and age, she collected her own measurements, building a substantial database of information.

Trotter's work with Goldine C. Gleser in 1952 created statistical regression formulae for the calculation of stature estimates from human long bones, based on a population of American casualties of the Korean War and the Terry collection of human remains. These formulae are still widely applied in the field.

In 1958, Trotter became Professor of Anatomy, holding that position until 1967, when she became subject to mandatory retirement at the age of 68. As professor emeritus, she continued to be active in research, lecturing, and writing until 1984. Between 1926 and 1967 she taught nearly 4,000 students, including Nobel laureates Dr. Earl Wilbur Sutherland, Jr. and Dr. Daniel Nathans.

She was a founding member of the American Association of Physical Anthropologists and their first woman president (1955-1957). She was president of the Missouri State Anatomical Board from 1957 to 1967, and president of the St. Louis Anatomical Board from 1941 to 1948 and from 1949 to 1967.

At age 86, Trotter had a disabling stroke. At her wish, her body was donated after her death on August 23, 1991, to the Washington University School of Medicine.

== Awards and honors ==
Trotter received several honorary degrees, including an Sc.D. from Western College for Women in 1956, an Sc.D. from Mt. Holyoke College in 1960, and a D.Sc. from Washington University in 1980.

She was named as a Woman of Achievement in science in 1955, by the St. Louis Globe-Democrat. She was the first woman to receive the Viking Fund Medal in Physical Anthropology from the Wenner Gren Foundation for Anthropological Research in 1956.

The Mildred Trotter Prize, named in her honor for her work on skeletal biology, is given to students for exceptional work in the field of physical anthropology.

== Biography ==
In 2022, Routledge published her biography entitled Mildred Trotter and the Invisible Histories of Physical and Forensic Anthropology. It was written by Emily Wilson.
