= Ellis R. Kerley =

American anthropologist (1924–1998)

Ellis R. Kerley (September 1, 1924 – September 3, 1998) was an American anthropologist and pioneer in the field of forensic anthropology, which is a field of expertise particularly useful to criminal investigators and for the identification of human remains for humanitarian purposes. Best known for his work in age dating of specimens, Kerley also made humanitarian contributions by identifying the remains of repatriated American soldiers from the Korean and Vietnam Wars.

Kerley published 40 papers during his lifetime and helped establish the field of forensic anthropology. Kerley helped to take what was once considered a speculative field and transform it into a highly respected and scientifically accepted discipline. Kerley is most known for his work in the identification of the remains of Josef Mengele, the former Nazi surgeon known as the "Butcher of Auschwitz".

== Career ==
Kerley served in the U.S. Army during World War II and later worked for the Army and the Armed Forces Institute of Pathology. Kerley earned his B.A. from the University of Kentucky and his Masters and Phd. from the University of Michigan. Kerley was employed during the 1950s with the U.S. Army American Graves Registration Service identifying the remains of deceased soldiers from World War II and the Korean War.

During the 1960s Kerley developed what is now known in the field of forensic anthropology as the "Kerley Method". This method examines thin cross sections of human remains, specifically long bones such as the femur and humerus, and investigates areas of altered bone. As a human skeleton grows and matures during a lifetime, a condition similar to osteoporosis occurs naturally. Cells replacing decaying bone matter eat away at existing bone, creating fragments which increase with age. Counting the number of these fragments in a cross section shows a corresponding increase of the fragments with an increase in the age of the person. The bone replacement ceases upon a person's death. Kerley's published work on the matter in 1965, was based on the study of 126 specimens whose ages were already known by the Smithsonian Institution. In all but 11 specimens, the Kerley Method identified the remains within a margin of plus or minus 4.6 years. The subjects studied by Kerley ranged in age from 5 to 95. By the 1970s, the method was considered a standard in the field of forensic anthropology for determination of age, and over 40 age determinations had been made, to even badly burned and disfigured remains with similar results.

In 1987 Kerley became the Forensic Anthropology Consultant and Scientific Director of the United States Army Central Identification Laboratory in Hawaii, where he oversaw the identification of repatriated Vietnam War remains. Kerley also contributed to hair analysis as it pertains to race, age, sex and cause of death. Child abuse studies were also a field of expertise to Kerley by examining post mortem remains and identifying successive bodily injury which shows differing degrees of healing. From 1990 to 1991, he served as President of the American Academy of Forensic Sciences.

Kerley worked on identifying the remains of victims of the Space Shuttle Challenger disaster, the mass suicide remains from Jonestown, northwestern Guyana, the 1985 MOVE bombing in West Philadelphia, and the House investigations of the John F. Kennedy and Lee Harvey Oswald assassinations. Prior to his death, Kerley was heavily involved in the identification of repatriated American soldiers from the Vietnam War. Kerley held a full Professorship at the University of Maryland, College Park. In 2000, the Ellis Kerley Foundation was formed in Kerley's honor to continue to advance the field of forensic anthropology.
