= Nineth Montenegro =

Guatemalan activist and politician

The Honourable Nineth Montenegro
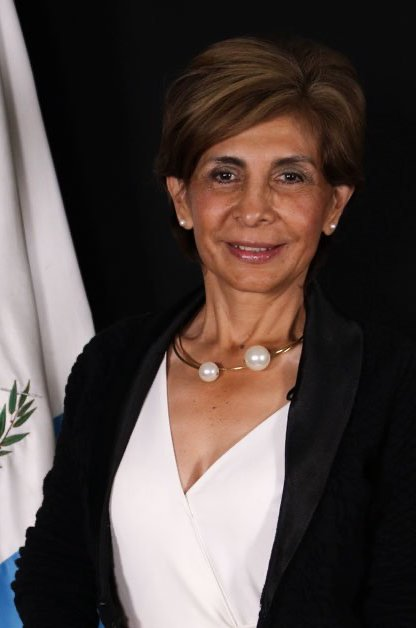
- Official portrait

Second Vice President of the Congress of Guatemala
- In office 14 January 2012 – 14 January 2013
- President: Gudy Rivera
- Preceded by: Carlos López Girón
- Succeeded by: Christian Boussinot

Secretary General of Encuentro por Guatemala
- In office 14 April 2007 – 27 February 2020
- Preceded by: Position established
- Succeeded by: Position abolished

Deputy of the Congress of Guatemala
- In office 14 January 1996 – 14 January 2020
- Constituency: National List

Personal details
- Born: 1958 (age 67–68) San Marcos, Guatemala
- Party: Encuentro por Guatemala

Nineth Varenca Montenegro Cottom (born 1958 in San Marcos, Guatemala) is a Guatemalan human rights activist and a victim of state terrorism. She was the first person to face civil resistance on a national level as a result of protesting in the streets about the whereabouts of her husband, Edgar Fernando García, who had been captured illegally by the government and has been a missing person since February 18, 1984. The disappearance of her husband still remains an unsolved case, as he is considered a disappeared person.

She is married to Mario Polanco, the current director of GAM (Spanish: Grupo de Apoyo Mutuo).

== Militancy ==
In September 1984, she joined with other family members of victims of state violence and founded GAM ("Mutual Support Group"; Spanish: Grupo de Apoyo Mutuo), one of Guatemala's oldest and best-known human rights organizations.

After receiving her teaching degree from Instituto Normal Central para Señoritas Belén, she worked as a teacher in public schools for many years. She was considered a hero and a role model for women at one of the last schools she taught at, "No 151 en la zona 7".

Since 1979, she has dedicated herself to social struggles. As a consequence of her constant protesting, she has received thousands of death threats. She has also appeared in Amnesty International videos that portray social struggles in Guatemala.

== Politics ==
Montenegro was elected to Congress in 1996 and, since then, has dedicated herself to monitoring the functions of multiple public institutions, including the armed forces, where she managed to detect abnormal activity that caused the illicit enrichment of several army officials.

Since 2004, she has dedicated herself to building her own political party, Encuentro por Guatemala, for which she received public support. Her political party united with Visión con Valores, which obtained six seats in Congress, giving her another term of office for the 2008-12 legislative session, as second vice president. In October 2019, she lost her parliamentary immunity as a result of accusations of illegal funding of her political party.

== Awards ==
She was named person of the year by various magazines and other media reports.

She has received international recognition in:

- The United States
- Spain
- Austria
- France
- Canada
- Argentina

== See also ==
- Mario Polanco
