= Louis A. Gottschalk =

American psychiatrist and neuroscientist

- Born: August 26, 1916; Missouri, US
- Died: November 27, 2008 (aged 92); California, US
- Education: Soldan High School, St. Louis; Washington University in St. Louis
- Known for: Gottschalk–Gleser scale
- Awards: UCI Medal
- Scientific career
- Fields: Neuroscience
- Workplaces: Washington University in St. Louis; US Public Health Service; Michael Reese Hospital; National Institute of Mental Health; Walter Reed Army Institute of Research; University of Cincinnati; University of California, Irvine

Louis August Gottschalk (August 26, 1916 – November 27, 2008) was an American psychiatrist and neuroscientist.

Gottschalk earned his M.D. at Washington University in St. Louis in 1943 and his Ph.D. from Southern California Psychoanalytic Institute in 1977.

He was the founding chairman of the Department of Psychiatry and Human Behavior at University of California Irvine College of Medicine.

He gained national prominence by announcing in 1987 that Ronald Reagan had been suffering from diminished mental ability as early as 1980. He came to this conclusion by using the Gottschalk–Gleser scales, an internationally used diagnostic tool he helped develop for charting impairments in brain function, to measure speech patterns in Reagan's 1980 and 1984 presidential debates.

Gottschalk coinvented software that uncovered a link between childhood attention deficit disorder and adult addiction to alcohol and drugs. In 2004, at age 87, he published his last book, World War II: Neuropsychiatric Casualties, Out of Sight, Out of Mind.

In 2006, his son filed a suit alleging that Gottschalk had lost millions of dollars in an advance-fee scam.

Gottschalk died at his home on November 27, 2008.

== Selected publications ==
=== Books ===
- Louis A. Gottschalk and Goldine C. Gleser (1969), Measurement of Psychological States Through the Content Analysis of Verbal Behaviour, Univ. of California Press, ISBN 978-0-520-01482-4
- Gottschalk, Louis A. (1979), The Content analysis of verbal behavior: further studies, SP Medical Scientific Books, ISBN 978-0-89335-047-5
- Gottschalk, Louis A. (1984), How to understand and analyze your own dreams, Corona Del Mar, Calif.: Art Reproductions Press, ISBN 978-0-939373-00-0
- Gottschalk, Louis A. (1985), The tree of knowledge, Corona del Mar, Calif.: Eden Press, ISBN 978-0-533-01652-5
- Gottschalk, Louis A. (1989), How to do self-analysis and other self-psychotherapies, Northvale, N.J.: J. Aronson, ISBN 978-0-87668-847-2
- Gottschalk, Louis A. (1995), Content analysis of verbal behavior: new findings and clinical applications, Hillsdale, New Jersey: Lawrence Erlbaum Associates, ISBN 978-0-8058-1558-0
- Gottschalk, Louis A. (2004), World War II: Neuropsychiatric Casualties, Out of Sight, Out of Mind, Nova Science Publishers, ISBN 978-1-59033-834-6

=== Articles ===
- Gottschalk, L.A. (1947), "Systematic psychotherapy of the psychoses", Psychiatric Quarterly, 21 (4): 554–574, doi:10.1007/BF01654318, PMID 18904522, S2CID 46668544
- Gottschalk, L.A. (1948), "Bibliotherapy As an Adjuvant in Psychotherapy", American Journal of Psychiatry, 104 (10): 632–637, doi:10.1176/ajp.104.10.632, PMID 18913430
- Gottschalk, L.A. (1956), "The Relationship of Psychologic State and Epileptic Activity—Psychoanalytic Observations on an …", Psychoanalytic Study of the Child, 11: 352–380, doi:10.1080/00797308.1956.11822793
- Gottschalk, L.A.; Whitman, R.M. (1962), "Some Typical Complications Mobilized by the Psycho-Analytic Procedure", International Journal of Psycho-Analysis, 43: 142–150
- Gottschalk, L.A.; Gleser, G.C.; Wylie, H.W.; Kaplan, S.M. (1965), "Effects of imipramine on anxiety and hostility levels", Psychopharmacology, 7 (4): 303–310, doi:10.1007/BF00403696, PMID 5319124, S2CID 36814466
- Gottschalk, Louis A.; Stone, Walter N.; Gleser, Goldine C.; Iacono, James M. (1966), "Anxiety Levels in Dreams: Relation to Changes in Plasma Free Fatty Acids", Science, 153 (3736): 654–657, doi:10.1126/science.153.3736.654, PMID 5939937, S2CID 11760499
- Gottschalk, L.A.; Pattison, E.M. (1969), "Psychiatric Perspectives on T-Groups and the Laboratory Movement: an Overview", American Journal of Psychiatry, 126 (6): 823–839, doi:10.1176/ajp.126.6.823, PMID 4900820
- Gottschalk, L.A.; Fox, R.A.; Bates, D.E. (1973), "A Study of Prediction and Outcome in a Mental Health Crisis Clinic", American Journal of Psychiatry, 130 (10): 1107–1111, doi:10.1176/ajp.130.10.1107, PMID 4728903
- Gottschalk, L.A.; Stone, W.N.; Gleser, G.C. (1974), "Peripheral Versus Central Mechanisms Accounting for Antianxiety Effects of Propranolol", Psychosomatic Medicine, 36 (1): 47–56, doi:10.1097/00006842-197401000-00004, PMID 4359336, S2CID 26692155
- Gottschalk, L.A. (1976), "Children's speech as a source of data toward the measurement of psychological states", Journal of Youth and Adolescence, 5 (1): 11–36, doi:10.1007/BF01537082, PMID 24407969, S2CID 46172594
- Gottschalk, L.A.; McGuire, F.L.; Heiser, J.F.; Dinovo, E.C.; Birch, H. (1979), "A Review of Psychoactive Drug-Involved Deaths in Nine Major United States Cities" (PDF), Substance Use & Misuse, 14 (6): 735–758, doi:10.3109/10826087909041905, PMID 489171
- Gottschalk, L.A.; Hoigaard-martin, J.C.; Eckardt, M.J.; Gilbert, R.L.; Wolf, R.J. (1982), "Cognitive Impairment and Other Psychological Scores Derived from the Content Analysis of Speech in …" (PDF), The American Journal of Drug and Alcohol Abuse, 9 (4): 447–460, doi:10.3109/00952998209002646, PMID 7188005
- Gottschalk, L.A.; Fronczek, J.; Abel, L. (1993), "Emotions, Defenses, Coping Mechanisms, and Symptoms", Psychoanalytic Psychology, 10 (2): 237–260, doi:10.1037/h0079459
- Gottschalk, L.A.; Bechtel, R. (1995), "Computerized measurement of the content analysis of natural language for use in biomedical and …", Computer Methods and Programs in Biomedicine, 47 (2): 123–130, doi:10.1016/0169-2607(95)01645-A, PMID 7587159
- Gottschalk, L.A.; Defrancisco, D.O.N.; Bechtel, R.J. (2002), "Computerized Content Analysis of Some Adolescent Writings of Napoleon Bonaparte: A Test of the Validity of the Method", The Journal of Nervous and Mental Disease, 190 (8): 542–8, doi:10.1097/00005053-200208000-00007, PMID 12193839, S2CID 26851591
