= Hospital Durand =

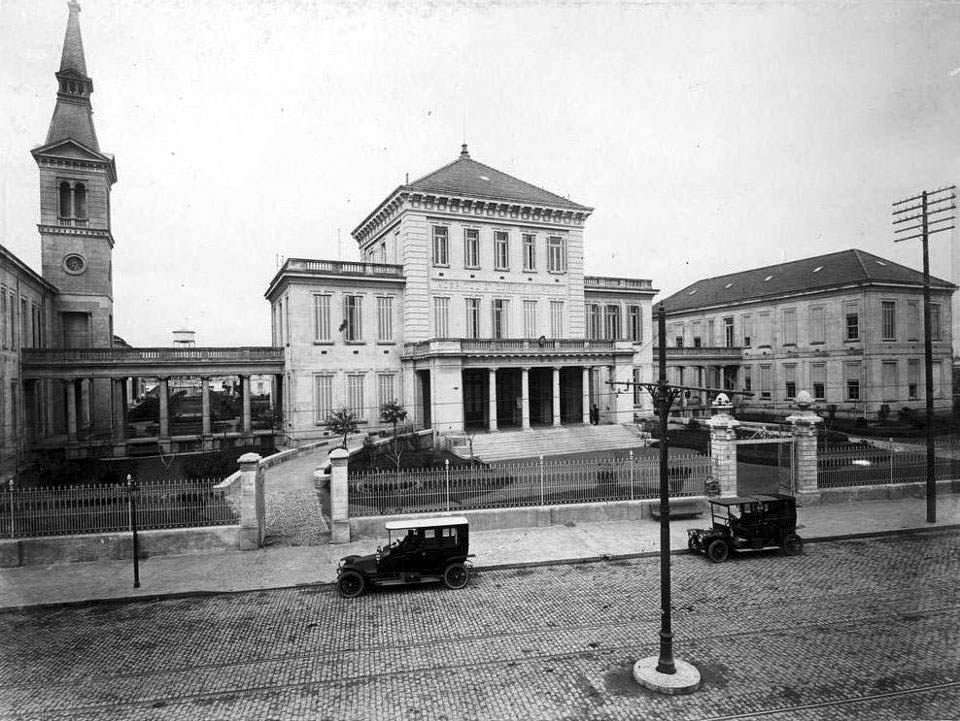
- Hospital Durand in 1913

Geography
- Location: Buenos Aires, Argentina
- Coordinates: 34.610°S 58.438°W

Organisation
- Type: General

History
- Opened: April 28, 1913

Links
- Lists: Hospitals in Argentina

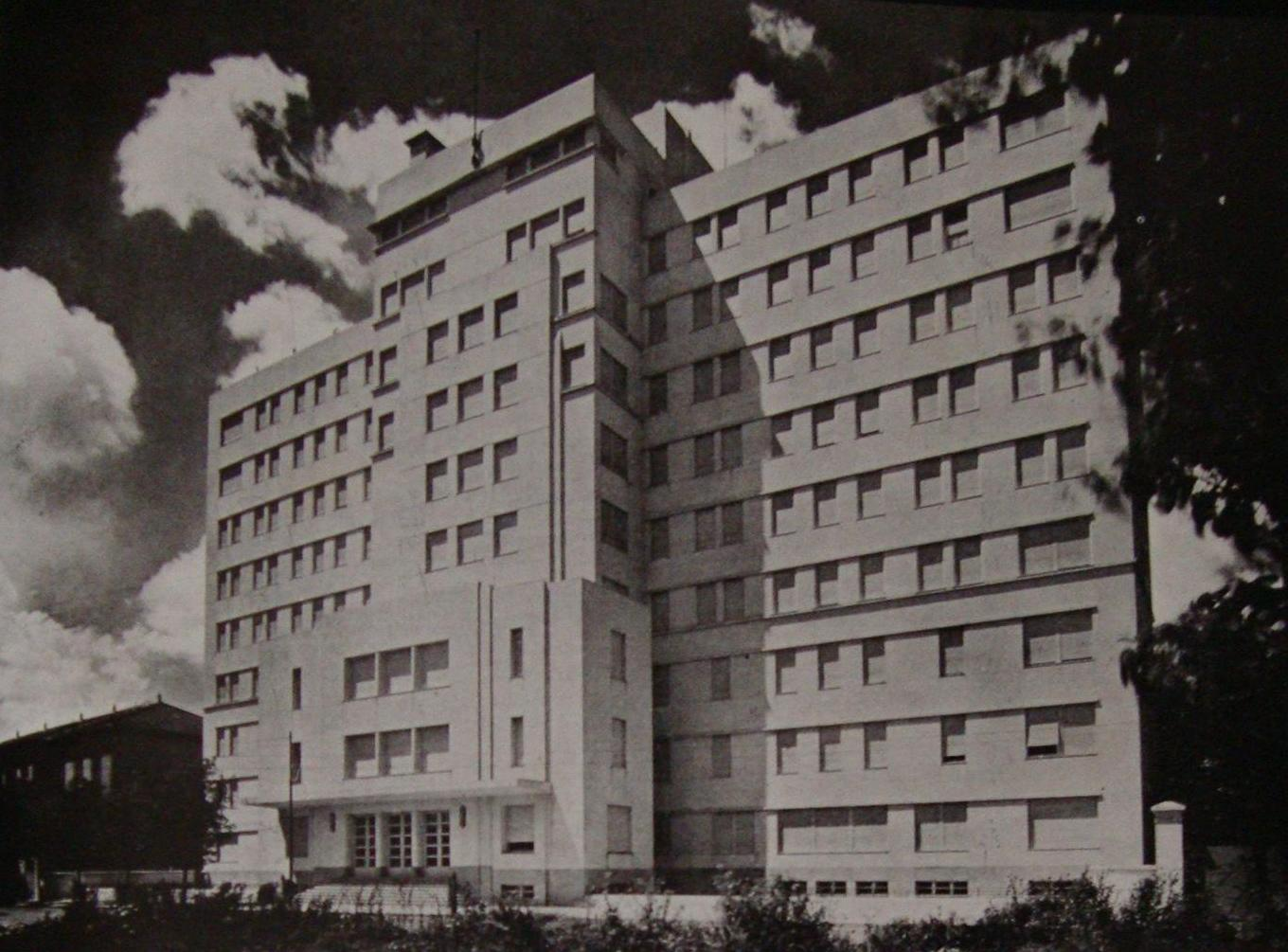
Hospital Durand in 1945

Hospital Durand, officially named "El Hospital General de Agudos Carlos G. Durand'" is one of the public city hospitals in Buenos Aires, Argentina. It is located in a modern building, constructed in the 1970s near the Parque Centenario (in the Caballito neighborhood), and its address is Avenida Díaz Vélez 5044.

== History ==
This hospital owes its existence to the doctor Carlos Durand, a man of a tortuous life who in his will indicated that he donated all his capital for the construction of "a Hospital for Men".

Dr. José Penna was in charge of choosing a terrain, and ended up deciding on the old Quinta Ezpeleta, in Caballito. An architectural project competition was held in 1907, and after the selection of Juan Antonio Buschiazzo as the winner, the construction was in charge of the Engineer Alfredo Buschiazzo.

The cornerstone was laid on June 20, 1909. But the works were delayed and also required new budget lines. The keys to the building were handed over to the Municipality of Buenos Aires on March 18, 1912, but the hospital was not yet ready to operate, so the terms were extended longer and more funds were needed.

The Carlos G. Durand Hospital was finally opened on April 28, 1913. Over time, expansions were soon necessary, and the service was also extended to women.

== Expansion and reform ==
In 1950 there was a period of incorporation of wards, mostly dedicated to caring for the chronically ill. In 1944 the National Health Directorate was created, under the Ministry of the Interior, the hospital was expanded between 1947 and 1951, doubling its capacity as part of the new conception of state health that was printed by the administration of Minister Ramón Carrillo.

After several decades, the construction of a new building in accordance with current medicine, called "Complementary Medical Center", became necessary. For this reason, a new project competition was called in 1971. The winner was the studio of Manteola, Petchersky, Sánchez Gómez, Santos, Solsona and Viñoly . The works spanned the following years and meant the almost total demolition of the old hospital, except for the most recent Medical-Surgical Institute, current Roman Pavilion, and the pavilion located further west, the Rays Pavilion, which still retains its original structure intact. The latter is seen further to the right in the 1913 photograph.. In 2005 a new guard building was opened.

Currently it has infrastructure problems, including lack of heating.
