= William R. Maples =

William Maples
- Born: August 7, 1937; Dallas, Texas, United States
- Died: February 27, 1997 (aged 59); Gainesville, Florida, United States
- Education: University of Texas (PhD)
- Spouse: Margaret Kelly (m. 1958)
- Children: 2 daughters
- Scientific career
- Fields: Forensic anthropologist
- Workplaces: University of Florida

William Ross Maples (August 7, 1937 – February 27, 1997) was an American forensic anthropologist working at the C.A. Pound Human Identification Laboratory at the Florida Museum of Natural History. His specialty was the study of bones. He worked on several high-profile criminal investigations, including those concerning historical figures such as Francisco Pizarro, the Romanov family, Joseph Merrick (known as the "Elephant Man"), President Zachary Taylor, and Medgar Evers. His insights often proved beneficial in closing cases that otherwise may have remained unsolved.

He is the author of Dead Men Do Tell Tales: The Unusual and Fascinating Cases of a Forensic Anthropologist (co-authored by Michael Browning). The book chronicles his career in forensic anthropology and some of his high-profile cases.

== Personal life ==
Maples married Margaret Kelly in 1958. They had two children, Lisa and Cynthia.

Maples completed his doctorate at the University of Texas at Austin in 1967. On February 27, 1997, he died at his home in Gainesville, Florida, from a cancerous brain tumor. and is buried in Evergreen Cemetery in Gainesville.
