= Goldine Gleser =

American psychologist and statistician

- Born: 1915; St. Louis, Missouri, U.S.
- Died: 2004 (aged 89)
- Children: 3

Academic background
- Education: Washington University in St. Louis (AB, MS, PhD)

Academic work
- Discipline: Psychology · psychiatry · statistics
- Sub-discipline: Psychological testing · Generalizability theory · defence mechanisms
- Institutions: University of Cincinnati

Goldine C. Gleser (1915 – 2004) was an American psychologist and statistician known for her research on the statistics of psychological testing, on generalizability theory, on defence mechanisms, on the psychological effects on child survivors of the Buffalo Creek flood, for her work with Mildred Trotter on estimation of stature, and for her participation in the Cincinnati Radiation Experiments. She was a professor of psychiatry and psychology at the University of Cincinnati.

== Early life and education ==
Gleser was originally from St. Louis, Missouri. She studied mathematics at Washington University in St. Louis, graduating Phi Beta Kappa in 1935 and earning a master's degree in 1936. Although she was working towards a doctorate in mathematics, she interrupted her studies to marry a civil engineer, and later switched to psychology, completing a Ph.D. at Washington University in 1950.

== Career ==
Gleser began part-time work at the University of Cincinnati in 1956, and in 1964 became a full professor of psychiatry and psychology. She was director of the university's psychology division beginning in 1967, and chief outpatient psychologist at Cincinnati General Hospital from 1968 to 1972. Glesner was also a visiting professor at Stanford University and Macquarie University.

In 1974, Gleser was elected as a fellow of the American Statistical Association. She was also a fellow of the American Psychological Association, the American College of Neuropsychopharmacology, a member of the New York Academy of Sciences, a trustee of the Psychometric Society, and president of the Society of Multivariate Experimental Psychology for 1977–1978.

== Selected publications ==
=== Books ===
- Cronbach, Lee J.; Gleser, Goldine C. (1957), Psychological Tests and Personnel Decisions, University of Illinois Press
- Gottschalk, Louis A.; Gleser, Goldine C. (1969), The Measurement of Psychological States Through the Content Analysis of Verbal Behavior, University of California Press, doi:10.1525/9780520376762, ISBN 9780520376762
- Gleser, Goldine C.; Green, Bonnie L.; Wingel, Carolyn (1981), Prolonged Psychosocial Effects of Disaster: A study of Buffalo Creek, Elsevier, doi:10.1016/c2013-0-10731-3, ISBN 9780122862601

=== Articles ===
- Trotter, Mildred; Gleser, Goldine C. (December 1952), "Estimation of stature from long bones of American Whites and Negroes", American Journal of Physical Anthropology, 10 (4): 463–514, doi:10.1002/ajpa.1330100407, PMID 13007782
- Cronbach, Lee J.; Gleser, Goldine C. (1953), "Assessing similarity between profiles.", Psychological Bulletin, 50 (6): 456–473, doi:10.1037/h0057173, PMID 13112334
- Cronbach, Lee J.; Rajaratnam, Nageswari; Gleser, Goldine C. (November 1963), "Theory of generalizability: A liberalization of reliability theory", British Journal of Statistical Psychology, 16 (2): 137–163, doi:10.1111/j.2044-8317.1963.tb00206.x
- Gleser, Goldine C.; Ihilevich, David (1969), "An objective instrument for measuring defense mechanisms.", Journal of Consulting and Clinical Psychology, 33 (1): 51–60, doi:10.1037/h0027381, PMID 5776301
- Green, Bonnie L.; Korol, Mindy; Grace, Mary C.; Vary, Marshall G.; Leonard, Anthony C.; Gleser, Goldine C.; Smitson-Cohen, Sheila (November 1991), "Children and disaster: Age, gender, and parental effects on PTSD symptoms", Journal of the American Academy of Child & Adolescent Psychiatry, 30 (6): 945–951, doi:10.1097/00004583-199111000-00012, PMID 1757444
