= Aura Elena Farfán =

Guatemalan human rights activist

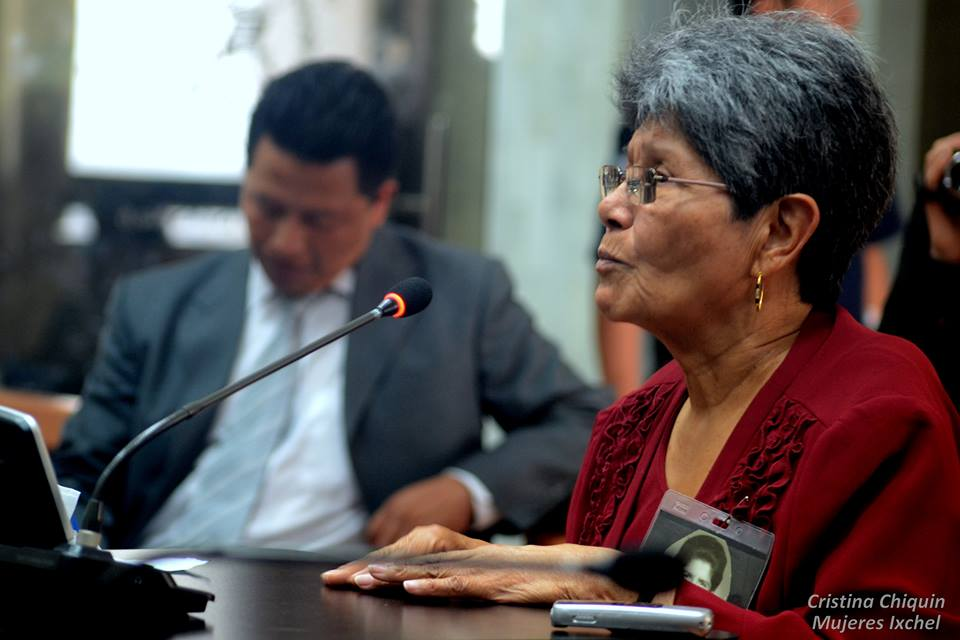
Aura Elena Farfan

Aura Elena Farfán is a Guatemalan human rights activist who takes an interest in the many people who have disappeared as a result of actions by the Guatemalan government.

== Life ==
Farfán became an activist after her brother was abducted by her country's military in 1984.

She investigated the Dos Erres massacre which took place in 1982 and 200 people were killed. As a result of her and others work several members of the military have been convicted of the crimes.

She is one of the founders and Executive Director of FAMDEGUA (Familiares de Detenidos y Desaparecidos de Guatemala), a Guatemala City-based organization dedicated to surviving family members of people who have been disappeared by the Guatemalan government. It is one of Guatemala's oldest human rights organizations. Farfán has been the subject of frequent death threats as the result of her activities, and was, along with her driver, briefly kidnapped by armed assailants on 4 May 2001.

She was featured in TIME magazine in 2015 and she received the International Women of Courage Award in 2018.
