= Mortuary archaeology =

Archaeological sub-discipline

Mortuary archaeology (also said burial archaeology, funerary archaeology, or archaeology of death) studies burial assemblages and human remains in order to understand ancient mortuary (or funerary) behaviors. Mortuary archaeology can be considered a sub-field of bioarchaeology, which is the study of human remains in their archaeological context. However, while bioarchaeology studies the full range of information about the lives and deathways of ancient individuals that is preserved on their skeletal remains, mortuary archaeology seeks to comprehend ancient concepts of status, religion, afterlife, and identity through the treatment of dead body.

== Theoretical approaches to the study of archaeological burials ==
Mortuary archaeologists draw upon the humanities, as well as social and hard sciences to have a full understanding of the individual and the sociocultural context that built the burial.

Mortuary contexts hold a prominent role in the analyses of the archaeological past, since human bones are the most direct evidence of the lives and experiences of ancient individuals. As a result, burials have long attracted the attention of those archaeologists interested in significant issues such as the rise of social inequality, intracultural differentiation, concepts of property, religion and ritual, and the construction of identity. However, the ways in which burials are classified and interpreted largely depends on the research questions being asked and the theoretical perspectives adopted by the scholars that study them. These approaches have been increasingly diverse, especially over the last half century.

=== Processual and postprocessual mortuary archaeologies ===
The Saxe-Binford research program marked the initial systematic effort to develop a theory of mortuary archaeology. Processual archaeologists adopted a structuralist perspective, positing a direct correlation between funerary contexts and socio-economic organization. The greatest source of variability between burials was considered to be the number and nature of socio-economic and affective relationships in which the deceased was involved in life. Funerary goods were interpreted as reflections of such socio-economic variation.

Processual archaeologists argued that intra- and inter-cemetery diversity could offer insights into the socio-economic structure of past societies. They aimed to find cross-cultural patterns regarding variation and similarities of funerary treatments within a given society. Ethnographic evidence played a crucial role in these analyses. Some archaeologists applied revised versions of the Saxe-Binford program to carry out inter- or intra-regional comparisons to understand the determinants for funerary variability. These works integrated additional variables in their analysis. Some of these cross-cultural investigations considered that religious and philosophical concepts are a significant ("if obvious”, quoting Parker-Pearson) source for funerary diversity. Ian Morris recognized that, even though mortuary treatments ideally reflect social structures, ancestor cult and burial could be part of strategies of integration and exclusion.

The postprocessual movement(s) came in the later 1970s as a reaction to processual axioms. Especially, it asserted two main flaws in understanding sociocultural processes and burials:

1) burials do not reflect socio-economic organization; instead, they are the materialization of practices that contribute to the constant construction and modification of social relationships.

2) cross-cultural generalizations fail to consider specific ideological contexts. Such analyses erroneously disregard the specificity of each context and ignored that the “framework of cultural meaning” where action acquires sense is always historically constructed.

Post-processual archaeologists argued that funerary contexts did not reflect the social identities and status of the deceased during life. Instead, they considered ideology and meaningful action as compelling variables in mortuary diversity. The focus is on agency, on how individuals participate actively to the construction of social ties. Hence, funerary practices are part of active sets of practices carried out to fulfil political agendas through the manipulation of ideologically charged symbols.

=== Archaeothanatology ===
Archaeothanatology is the study of taphonomic processes that contribute to the formation of ancient burials. Despite being a methodological effort, it has had profound impacts on archaeological theory, especially theory of formation processes and how the archaeological context is formed. Several studies have demonstrated the intermingling of human and natural causes to the differential preservation and integrity of human remains, challenging previous ideas that consider human activities as the only field of inquiry for mortuary archaeologists. Working especially alongside bioarchaeologists, archaeothanatologists attempt to unravel the complexity of archaeological bones' diagenesis and its relationship to ancient funerary practices.

== Methodology ==
There are two main methods used by mortuary archaeologists to analyze the context of a burial as well as the individual that is buried. The first type of method looks at the burial and human remains context. The next method looks at the remains in the lab to see what information can be collected from the remains. These methods help researchers understand different aspects of the culture of a group.

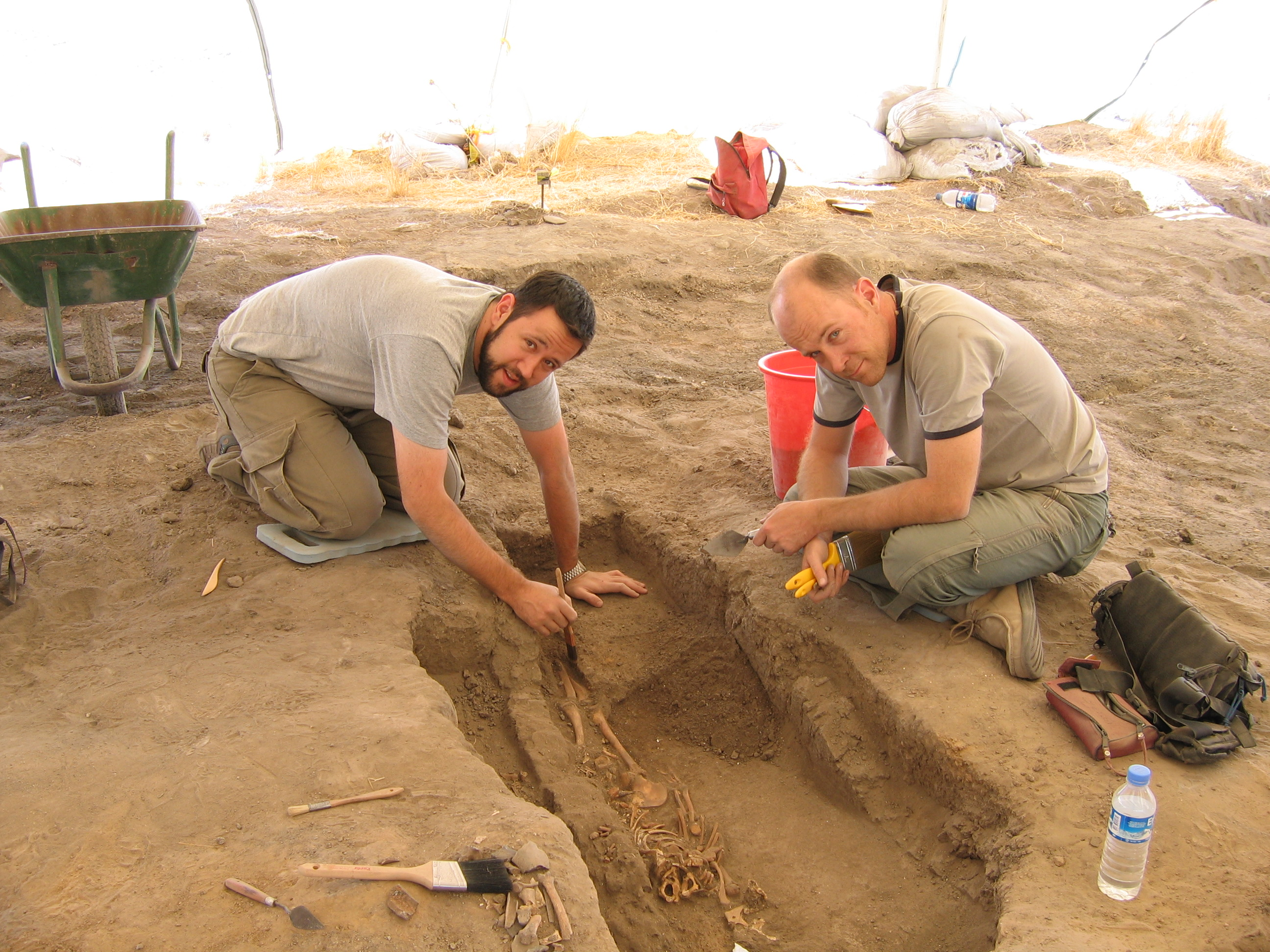
Archaeologists using the Burial Excavation method of Mortuary Archaeology to determine what an individual from the past was like and how they lived, from their skeletal remains.

=== Burial excavation ===
Analyzing burials helps understand the social organization of populations and the meaning behind how individuals are buried. Burial Excavation has been a source of controversy because remains are removed from their original burial in the process, and as a result it has been compared to "grave robbing". All cultures have a different way of disposing of the dead. These differences can stem from the environment that populations live in and their beliefs. One well known phrase, “the dead do not bury themselves,” means that the living places their ideas of the deceased as well as death on the burial practices. Some cultures have different burial practices depending on age and sex. When analyzing the burial, researchers look at:

1. Type of disposal
2. Location of burial
3. Body preparations
4. Articulation
5. Position
6. Deposition
7. Orientation
8. Grave goods

==== Disposal of the body ====
There are two broad categories for the disposal of the body: simple and compound disposal. A simple disposal is one inhumation at a specific point in time. Simple disposal has three different types of inhumations First, the body is placed underground or in a mound. Second, is aquatic disposal, in which the body is placed in water directly or in a craft and sent afloat. Third is a surface disposal, where the body is left on the surface to decompose naturally through the exposure of different living organisms. A compound disposal deals with two or more stages of disposal. These different stages include a variation of two of the following: exposure, burial, reburial, and cremation. There are two processes in a compound disposal. First, the reduction process, where the body decays completely before the next process. Second is the final or secondary disposal. This is the location where the individual will eventually end up permanently.

==== Location of burial ====
The researcher takes note of where the burial is located. While Western cultures usually bury their dead in cemeteries, many ancient cultures did not have designated cemeteries. Some cultures would bury their dead in the floor of the house or in a tomb if they are of higher status. Other areas of location can be between houses, in trash areas (middens), caves, or other culturally preferred areas of disposal.

==== Body preparation ====
The preparation of the body is looking at how the living prepared the deceased for burial. Body preparation can be embalming, being painted, or dressed in particular clothing. The researchers can analyze this as well as how the individual is buried, like in an urn or wood coffin.

==== Articulation ====
The articulation of a remains helps researchers determine how the individual was buried. A primary burial is the first and only interment of the body. This is the only time that remains should be found correctly articulated. A secondary burial is when an individual decomposes somewhere else and then is interred in their final resting spot. This can take the form of a bundle burial, where the bones first decompose and are collected before being in the ground. A reduced primary burial is a primary burial which was later intentionally altered by removing part of the remains.

==== Position ====
The position of the burial looks at the body, the head, and the arms separately. The position could help researchers say something about the populations ideas of death as well as common burial practices. There are two positions the body can be placed in. First is the extended position, where the individual is laid flat. The second is flexed, where the individual is in a fetal position. The position of the arms is suggested to be analyzed separately from the body because of intentional placement. The arms can be along the side of the body, crossed over the pelvis, folded across the chest, or have the hands over the face. The position of the head is looking at the rotation of the head around the central axis. In some cultures, it is important for the head to be facing a particular direction. These practices vary between cultures as well as time period trends.

==== Deposition ====
The deposition of the body is the “manner in which it has been deposited into the earth.” Through articulation, the researcher can determine if the individual was placed on the back, the face, the side, or a seated position. The extended position has two different depositions. First is supine, where the individual is on their back. Second is the prone position, where the individual is placed on their stomach face down. The depth of a burial can also give us clues as to the social status or gender of an individual and exhibits the degree of formality of the burial. Moreover, the shape and dimensions of the grave may give hints into other contexts of an individual's life.

==== Orientation ====
Researchers analyze the orientation of the body, grave, and disposal container. The orientation of the grave and container correlate with each other. The researcher observes the long axis of the grave and container. However, container will not be present if buried in perishable materials but could leave a stain to indicate that there was a container. The orientation of the body refers to the “direction in which the head lies in relation to a line between the skull and the center of the pelvis.” The orientation of the body, grave, and container can be described using degrees, cardinal directions, various subdivisions, or in relation to a natural ground feature, like a river.

==== Grave goods ====
The grave goods that are found in context with the burial help the researcher understand a culture's burial practices. These are materials or artifacts that are sometimes found along with remains. Archaeologists commonly divide these materials into two broad categories: objects directly associated with the body such as clothing or jewelry and objects accompanying the body which may include art or weapons. The grave goods can be placed around, in, on the body, and in the fill around the body. Some researchers believe that the gender and status of an individual can be studied based on the grave goods placed with the individual. Additionally, aspects such as economy, ethnic identity, as well as many other aspects of human identity can be determined from the artifacts that are found alongside human remains.

=== Creating a biological profile ===
The remains are then analyzed in the lab to create a biological profile. The researchers look at:

1. Sex
2. Ancestry
3. Age
4. Stature
5. Trauma
6. Pathology
7. Taphonomy
8. Minimum number of individuals (MNI)

The steps need to happen in chronological order because depending on the methods used, some rely on other aspects of the profile. For instance, there are age methods for specific ancestries.

Many of the methods that are used by bioarchaeologists are created by forensic anthropologists. These methods can be used because there are similarities between the bones at different time periods. However, it is advised to look at methods that correlate directly to the time period and group or culture being analyzed. The techniques for each of the different aspects of the biological profile can be found in Standards: For Data Collection from Human Skeletal Remains, the manual for researchers edited by Jane Buikstra and Douglas Ubelaker.

==== Sex ====
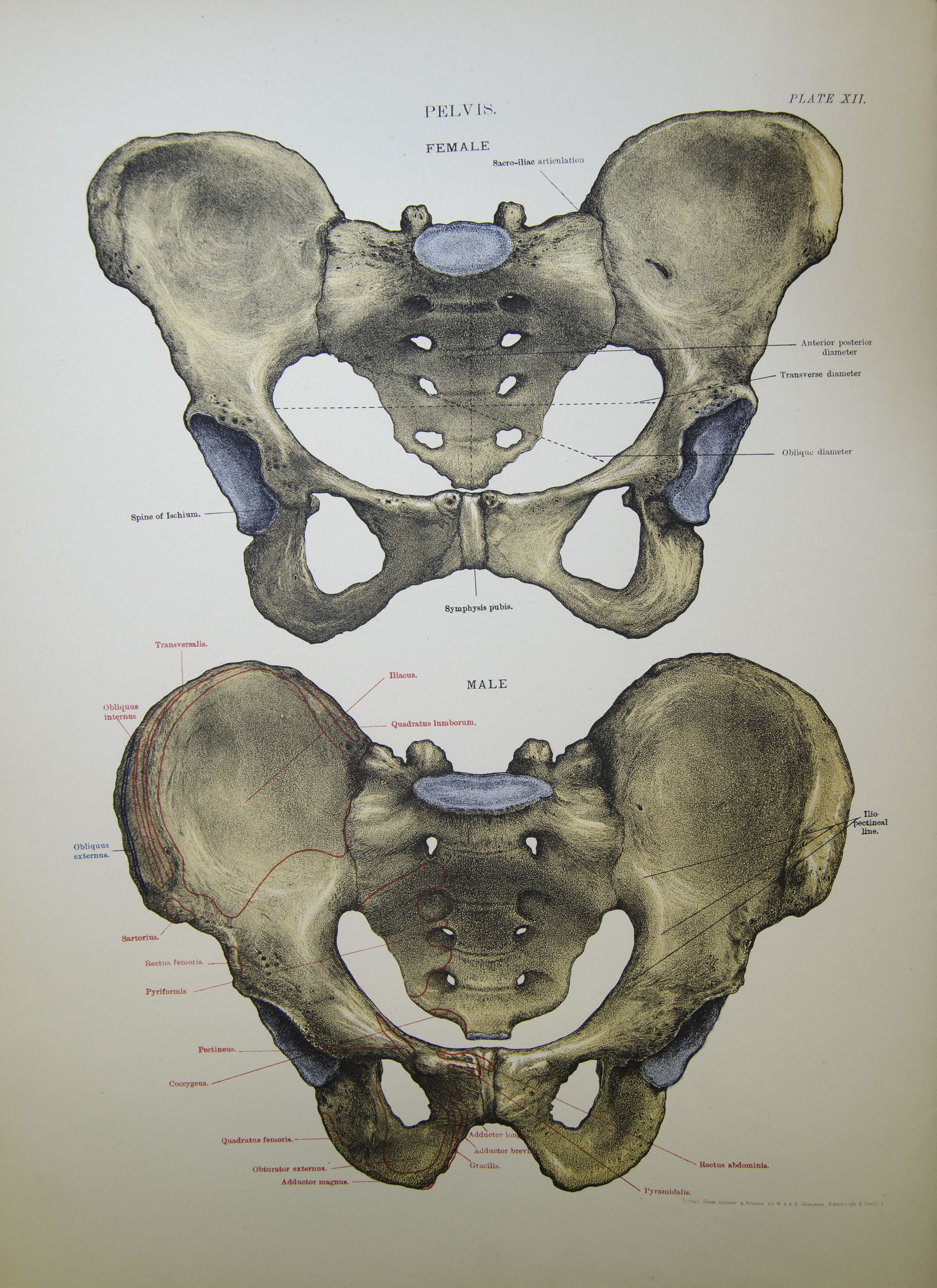
The distinct differences between the male and female pelvic bones have allowed researchers to indicate the sex of individuals. This was first done by T.W. Phenice in 1969.

When estimating the sex of an individual, this is looking at biological sex (male or female) not gender (boy or girl). The most common elements used for sexing an individual is the skull and the pelvis, because they are the most sexually dimorphic elements. The skeletal anatomy of younger individuals does not show sexual dimorphism so they cannot be sexed. There is no definite outcome when sexing the remains because the traits will vary in each individual. For this reason, researchers use possible or probably male/female.

The first researchers to look at the skull for estimating sex was Gy Acsadi and J. Nemerskeri. Philip Walker revised their method because it only looked at individuals of European descent. Walker looked at individuals from the Hamann-Todd collection as well as the Terry collection. The two collections included European, American, Native Americans, and African descent. Walker looked at five different features on the skull. Each trait is placed into a range of one (gracile) to five (robust), with individuals ranking at a three to be more indeterminate. All traits are averaged together to see if an individual is female or male.

The other element that researchers have looked at is the pelvis. This element is thought to be the best indicator of sex because of the difference in childbirth. The first person to look at the pelvis was T.W. Phenice in 1969. Phenice created a nonmetric method analyzing the traits of the pelvis to obtain an outcome. In 2012, Alexandra Klales, Stephen Ousley, and Jennifer Vollner revised Phenice's method. Klales and colleagues looked at three traits scored on a one to five scale, similar to that of the skull.

==== Ancestry ====
When estimating ancestry within a biodistance framework, most methods use nonmetric traits, or observable traits. The researcher looks at different morphological traits indicative of an ancestry. This causes more biases in the estimation. Researchers can also use metric traits from Standards and input the measurements into FORDISC to receive a result.

Nonmetric traits of the crania are probably the most well known for estimating ancestry. Stanley Rhine is one of the most cited researchers for estimating ancestry using five cranial features. Even with the use of these traits, the outcome is only an estimation because of human variation. Joseph Hefner and Ousley use the same traits but score them differently. With this new scoring method, traits characteristic of American Blacks are scored at a 0 and Whites scored as 1. Once the traits are scored, they are added together. With the compiled score 3 and below means of American Black ancestry while 4 and above is White.

Dental characteristics can also be used to estimate ancestry, particularly those listed in the Arizona State University Dental Anthropology System (ASUDAS). Heather Edgar looks at the different dental characteristics that might be able to help researchers distinguish ancestry. Some of these traits are shovel-shaped incisors indicative of Asians and Native Americans and Carabelli's cusps characteristic of European descent. The methods for estimating ancestry are scarce more work needs to be done. There also needs to be a protocol for collecting data for estimating ancestry.

==== Age ====
When aging remains, there are many different methods. However, the research first needs to see if the remains are fused or unfused before applying the different aging techniques. Individuals going through growth will have different aging methods than those of adults. There are four different aging techniques for adult individuals. These include cranial sutures, degradation of the pubic symphysis, auricular surface, and the sternal rib end of the first and fourth rib. Younger individuals age is based on tooth eruption and fusion of bone at different rates. Once the individual is aged, then they can be placed in different age categories: young adult (20–34 years), middle adult (35–49 years), and old adult (50+ years).

There are two different types of methods that researchers use for aging an individual: phase and component. The phase method looks at various traits on a bone and lumps them together into a phase. These methods include the pubic symphysis and first and fourth rib. The component method looks and scores each trait individually, assuming that degradation follows a set pattern. Cranial sutures is a good example of this method. The auricular surface displays both types of methods, where the traits are placed in a phase to create a composite score to be placed in an overall phase.

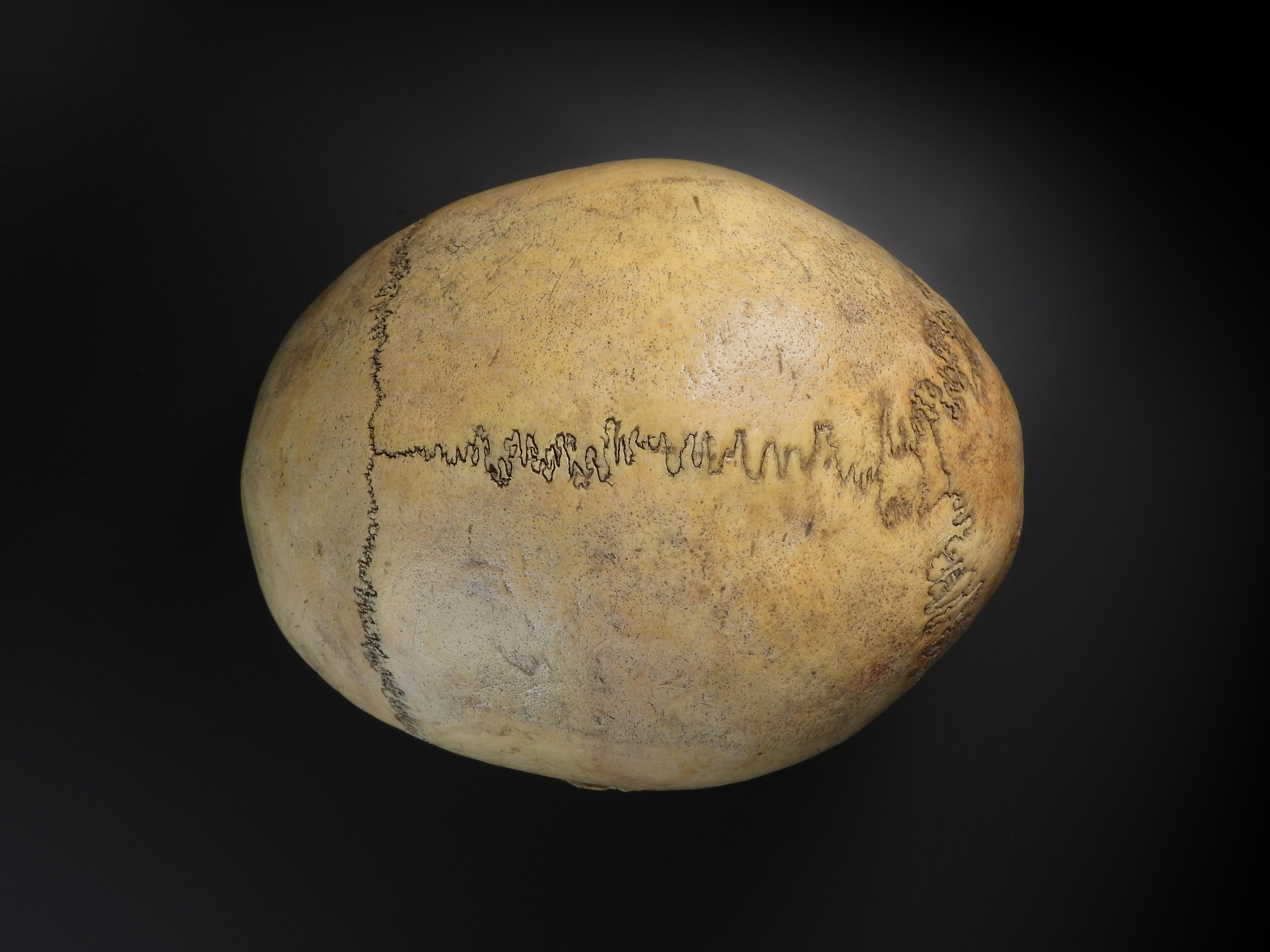
Cranial sutures from which archaeologists are able to establish age ranges of individuals based on the method created by Owen Lovejoy and Richard Meindl in 1985.

The method for cranial sutures was developed by Owen Lovejoy and Richard Meindl in 1985. (Lovejoy and Meindl 1985). This technique looks at the degree of closure for each cranial suture and then adds them together to get a composite score that will give an age range. This technique can be difficult when working with remains that have had cranial modification.

The next technique is looking at pubic symphysis degradation. The main contributors used today are Acsadi and Nemeskeri as well as Judy Suchey and Sheilagh Brooks, both of whom created aging methods based on the pubic symphysis. The first mention of looking at this trait was made by Todd in 1920. Between these two methods, Suchey and Brooks’ method is the preferred use when looking at this trait.

The third trait that can be used is the auricular surface. This trait is located where the sacrum attaches to the pelvis. This technique was first introduced by Lovejoy and colleagues in 1985 (Lovejoy et al. 1985). In 2002, Buckberry and Chamberlain revised this method, updating how to place an individual into a degradation phase. Daniel Osborne, Tal Simmons, and Stephen Nawrocki in 2004 also revised the work that Lovejoy and colleagues made. Osborne and colleagues refined the number of phases down from eight to six and showed how each phase might look.

The last form of aging for adults is looking at the first and fourth rib degradation. The fourth rib was the first of the two analyzed to create this method. The degradation of the fourth rib was identified by Ellis Kerley. M. Iscan, Susan Loth, and Ronald Wright in 1984, in hopes of creating a method that ages as well as the pubic symphysis. The issue with this method however, is that it was based purely on white males. Two complementary methods were created by Iscan and colleagues for studying white females and African Americans. Kunos and colleagues believe that the fourth rib is not the best to use due to misidentification in a disarticulated skeleton. Charles Kunos, Scott Simpson, Katherine Russel, and Israel Hershkovits created an aging method using the first rib. Elizabeth DiGangi, Jonathan Bethard, Erin Kimmerle, and Lyle Konigsberg revised the method and looked at two features on the rib.

==== Stature ====
The estimation of stature is only possible if there are complete long bones available There are two different techniques that can be used when estimating stature: anatomical and mathematical methods. The anatomical methods use all elements of the skeleton that contribute to height. These elements include the femur and tibia, the vertebral body heights, including the first sacral segment, talus and calcaneus, and the basion-bregma measurement of the skull. The mathematical methods, also known as the regression methods, look at the length of a single long bone or a group of bones. The mathematical methods, also known as the regression methods, look at the length of a single long bone or a group of bones.

The idea of the anatomical method was first introduced by Thomas Dwight in 1894. However, in 1956, G. Fully was the first one to create and apply this type of method. In his method, Fully adds together all components that contribute to statue and a soft-tissue correction. (Fully 1965). Michelle Raxter, Benjamin Auerbach, and Christoper Ruff revised Fully's method adding an age correction factor to the combined components and soft-tissue correction.

The mathematical method was first introduced by Karl Pearson in 1899. (Pearson 1899). Mildred Trotter and Goldine Gleser created one of the earliest mathematical methods. Two different publications by Trotter and Gleser includes a sample of individuals of African American and White American males, with some Native Americans, Mexican, Puerto Rican males, and African American and White American females. Rebecca Wilson, Nicholas Hermann, and Lee Meadows Jantz revised the Trotter and Gleser methods creating new regression formulae due to secular change in heights over time. With the introduction of technology, researchers can use a statistical software called FORDISC created by Stephen Ousley and Richard Jantz to automatically calculate the stature of individuals, as well as give the best bone and bone combinations for estimating stature for that individual. When estimating stature with any of the mathematic methods ancestry and time period needs to be known to create an accurate estimation.

==== Minimum number of individuals ====
The minimum number of individuals (MNI) is used to determine how many individuals were buried together, either comingled or disturbed. Keith Dobney and Kevin Rielly created a method looking at long bones divided into morphological zones. This method was introduced for looking at animal remains that are fragmented in hopes of determining how many types of animals there were in a particular area. Christopher Knusel and Alan Outram created a different method, called the zonation method in order to estimate MNI. This method divides the bone into different zones, so when the specific zone is analyzed, one can see how many zones are present in the collection to help estimate MNI.

==== Taphonomy and pathology ====
Taphonomy was first brought on by paleontologists in the 1930s. Taphonomy is the study of biological organisms and natural affects on the bone at the time of and after death. Various taphonomic processes include termite damage, water erosion, root damage, as well as many others. There are three categories of taphonomic processes: environmental, individual, and behavioral or cultural. Environmental factors are broken down further into two different categories, abiotic (nonliving factors like sun radiation and rainfall) and biotic (living factors like rodents and roots). Individual factors are “the intrinsic traits that the decedent brings to the decomposition process.” These include weight, age, and sex. Behavioral or cultural factors are the affects that other humans have on the remains during burial practices. This includes the embalming process.

Pathology is looking skeletal markers to understand diseases, nutrition, and the evolution of certain diseases in order to understand diseases today. The Osteological Paradox also helps researchers understand health among populations. The Osteological Paradox was introduced by James Wood in 1992 and says that there are three types of situations when it comes to pathological markers on bone. The first is that an individual was so unhealthy, that when particular disease was contracted, they die before it has a chance to leave lesions. Next you have the healthier individuals that have the disease and was able to fight it off, but not before lesions were formed. Lastly, an individual did not become sick and they died from other causes.

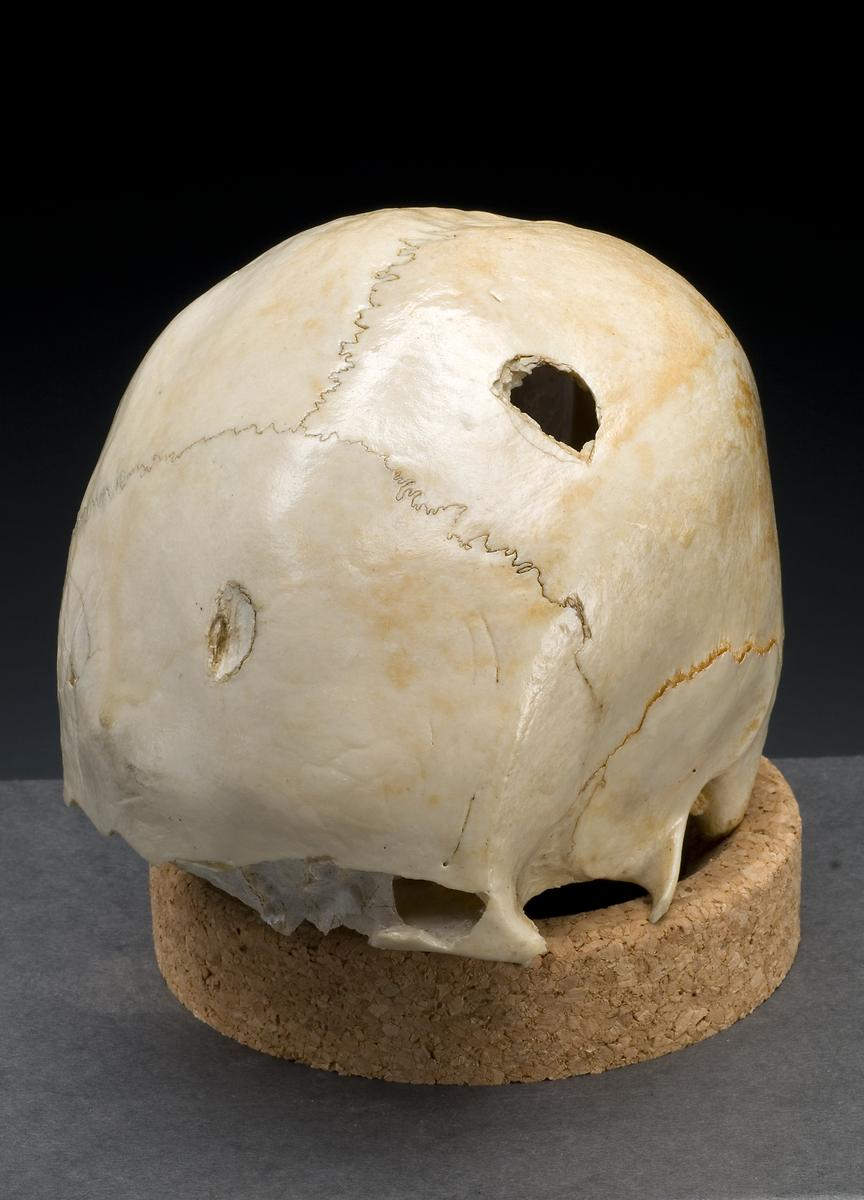
Blunt force trauma to the skull by the use of a hammer. This is the most common form of trauma.

Pathology is not only due to diseases, it can be caused by nutritional deficiencies, which are formed in the growth and development phase of bones. Some examples of nutritional pathologies are Harris lines and linear enamel hypoplasia. These form at a younger age and can also stunt the growth if the deficiency took place for a long period of time. A difficulty with studying pathology is that different diseases can cause similar lesions on the bone. However, pathologies are helpful for studying the health of individuals in a society. Donald Ortner writes extensively on different pathologies and different diseases affects on the bone.

==== Trauma ====
There are three types of trauma to keep in mind: ante-mortem, peri-mortem, and post-mortem trauma. Ante-mortem trauma is injuries to the bone before death that has evidence of healing. An example is when someone breaks their bone and it has started to heal or has healed completely. Cranial trepanation can also be considered ante-mortem trauma if there is evidence of healing, otherwise it would be considered peri-mortem trauma. Peri-mortem trauma is evidence of an injury to the bone at or around the time of death and could be the cause of death. Examples of this are a bullet wound for more contemporary cases, or an arrow wound in prehistoric cases. Post-mortem trauma is any break or taphonomy to the bone after death when the bone has dried.

The researcher also looks at blunt force trauma, sharp force trauma, or ballistic trauma. Blunt force trauma is seen as the most common form of trauma. It results in abrasions, bone fractures, lacerations, or contusions. An example of this type of trauma is falling from a high elevation. Sharp force trauma is “a narrowly focused, dynamic, slow-loaded, compressive force with a sharp object that produces damage to hard tissue in the form of an incision.” This can involve a variety of weapons or tools, like knives, that have beveled edge. Lastly, ballistic trauma is caused by projectiles.

== Cremation ==
A cremation burial involves the process of burning a corpse on a pyre and is another common form of burial. However, this process is unique because typically, no archaeological evidence can be gathered from the actual skeletal remains unless there are fragments of bone left behind and buried after the body is burned. These can be very extravagant and thorough burials and information might be gathered in unique ways. For example, trauma found through inspection of an individual's remaining bones may tell a unique story to an archaeologist that they could then build on. Moreover, other items may survive such as weapons that were unique to the individual, jewelry or possessions that could establish social status or gender, bones of animals, or articles of clothing belonging to the cremated individual. The color change of the bone as well as the shrinkage can also give clues to the temperature and/or duration of the pyre. These kinds of burials are unique in that archaeologists are forced to look "outside the box" and gather informations from aspects of the burial that might not typically be seen as wildly informative.
