= Dental anthropology =

Subfield of biological anthropology

Dental anthropology is a subfield of biological anthropology that studies the morphology, variation, and pathology of human teeth across populations and through time. It draws on methods from anatomy, genetics, archaeology, and forensic science to address questions about human evolution, population history, dietary adaptation, and biological relationships among groups.

Because teeth are the most durable structures in the human body and preserve well in the archaeological record, they provide a rich source of data for understanding past and present human populations.

== History ==
The study of human dental variation has roots in the late 19th and early 20th centuries. Early physical anthropologists noted differences in tooth size and shape among populations and used these observations to classify human groups. In the mid-20th century, Albert A. Dahlberg advanced the systematic study of dental morphology by developing standardized reference plaques for recording crown and root traits.

Christy G. Turner II expanded this work significantly with his research on dental morphology in Asian and Native American populations. Turner's classification of world populations into Sundadont and Sinodont dental patterns became influential in studies of human migration and population history. His work led to the development of the Arizona State University Dental Anthropology System (ASUDAS), now the standard framework for recording nonmetric dental traits worldwide.

== Methods ==
=== Dental morphology ===
Dental morphologists study the shape, size, and structural features of teeth. Nonmetric traits such as shovel-shaped incisors, Carabelli's trait, and molar cusp number are scored using standardized systems like the ASUDAS. These traits are largely genetically determined and vary in frequency among populations, making them useful for studying biological relationships and population history.

Metric analysis involves measuring crown dimensions, root lengths, and other quantitative features of teeth. These measurements can be used to assess sexual dimorphism, population affinity, and evolutionary trends in tooth size reduction over time.

=== Dental pathology ===
The study of dental disease in past populations provides information about diet, nutrition, oral hygiene, and overall health. Common pathological conditions examined include dental caries, periodontal disease, enamel hypoplasia, and dental calculus. The prevalence of caries, for example, tends to increase with the adoption of agriculture due to higher consumption of carbohydrates.

Enamel hypoplasia, visible as lines or pits on the tooth surface, indicates periods of physiological stress during childhood such as malnutrition or disease. These markers are widely used in bioarchaeology to assess the health of past populations.

=== Dental wear and microwear ===
Patterns of tooth wear reflect diet and food processing techniques. Gross wear patterns can indicate reliance on abrasive foods such as stone-ground grains, while dental microwear analysis examines microscopic scratches and pits on tooth surfaces to reconstruct the types of foods consumed. Microwear analysis has been applied to both fossil hominins and modern human populations.

=== Dental calculus ===
Mineralized dental plaque, or dental calculus, has become an important source of data in recent years. Analysis of calculus can reveal dietary particles such as starch granules and phytoliths, as well as ancient DNA and proteins from consumed foods and oral microorganisms.

== Applications ==
=== Population history and migration ===
Because dental morphological traits are highly heritable, their frequencies across populations can be used to reconstruct biological relationships and migration patterns. Turner's Sundadont-Sinodont model, for example, contributed to debates about the peopling of the Americas. More recent work has refined these models using larger datasets and more sophisticated statistical methods.

=== Forensic identification ===
Dental features are used in forensic dentistry for individual identification, age estimation, and ancestry assessment. Because teeth resist decomposition, they are often the primary means of identification in mass disasters and criminal investigations.

=== Diet and subsistence ===
Dental pathology, wear patterns, and calculus analysis together provide evidence about what past populations ate and how they processed their food. The transition from foraging to agriculture, for instance, is associated with increased caries rates, reduced dental wear, and changes in dental morphology related to a softer, more processed diet.

== Dental Anthropology Association ==
The Dental Anthropology Association (DAA) is a professional organization founded in 1986 dedicated to the study of dental anthropology, including the variation, evolution, and pathology of human and non-human primate dentition. The organization serves as the primary scholarly society for researchers working in the field of dental anthropology worldwide.

The DAA was established in 1986 to provide a formal organization for scholars studying dental variation in human and primate populations. Its founding reflected the growth of dental anthropology as a distinct subfield within biological anthropology during the latter half of the 20th century, building on the foundational work of researchers such as Albert A. Dahlberg and Christy G. Turner II.

The DAA organizes sessions and symposia at professional meetings, including the annual meetings of the American Association of Biological Anthropologists. These sessions provide a forum for presenting new research in dental anthropology and related fields. The organization also supports student involvement in the field through mentorship and conference participation.

=== Publications ===
The DAA publishes Dental Anthropology, a peer-reviewed journal featuring original research on all aspects of dental morphology, pathology, development, and evolution in human and non-human primates. The journal serves as the primary publication venue for researchers in the field and has published work on topics including population history, forensic identification, dietary reconstruction, and developmental biology of the dentition.

== See also ==
- Biological anthropology
- Bioarchaeology
- Forensic dentistry
- Dental analysis in archaeology
- Arizona State University Dental Anthropology System
- Paleopathology
