= Albert A. Dahlberg =

American biological anthropologist and dentist

Albert A. Dahlberg (1908–1993) was an American biological anthropologist and dentist known for pioneering the systematic study of dental morphology in human populations. His work laid the foundation for dental anthropology as a recognized subfield of biological anthropology.

== Career ==
Dahlberg spent much of his career at the University of Chicago, where he studied variation in tooth form across human populations. He was among the first researchers to develop standardized methods for recording and comparing dental traits, producing reference plaques that allowed researchers to score morphological features of teeth on consistent scales.

His reference plaques became widely adopted in physical anthropology and remained in use for decades. They provided the methodological basis for later standardized systems, including the Arizona State University Dental Anthropology System (ASUDAS) developed by Christy G. Turner II and colleagues.

== Research contributions ==
Dahlberg's research focused on the biological significance of variation in human teeth. He studied dental traits among Native American populations and contributed to the understanding of how tooth morphology reflects population history and genetic relationships. His work demonstrated that dental features, because they are largely under genetic control and resistant to environmental modification, are particularly useful for studying biological distances among human groups.

He also contributed to research on dental development, tooth size variation, and the relationship between dental and skeletal features in human populations.

== Legacy ==
Dahlberg is widely regarded as one of the founders of modern dental anthropology. His standardized approach to recording dental traits influenced generations of researchers and established methodological conventions still in use today. The Dental Anthropology Association, founded in 1986, carries forward the tradition of research that Dahlberg helped establish.

== See also ==
- Dental anthropology
- Biological anthropology
- Arizona State University Dental Anthropology System
- Christy G. Turner II
- Dental analysis in archaeology
