= John Krigbaum =

American biological anthropologist

- Education: New York University
- Awards: Fellow, American Association for the Advancement of Science (2025)
- Scientific career
- Fields: Biological anthropology
- Workplaces: University of Florida

John Krigbaum is Professor and Chair of the Department of Anthropology at the University of Florida. He is a biological anthropologist with broad interests in bioarchaeology, stable isotope analysis, and the archaeology of Malaysia. He serves as the director of the Bone Chemistry Lab at UF.

Krigbaum received his PhD in anthropology from New York University in 2001, under the direction of Terry Harrison. In 2025, Krigbaum was named a Lifetime Fellow of the American Association for the Advancement of Science.

== Notable publications ==
- Sharpe, Ashley E., Emery, Kitty F., Inomata, Takeshi, Triadan, Daniela, Kamenov, George D., and Krigbaum, John (2018) Earliest isotopic evidence in the Maya region for animal management and long-distance trade at the site of Ceibal, Guatemala. Proceedings of the National Academy of Sciences 115, 3605–3610.
- Jeong, C., Wilkin, S., Amgalantugs, T., Bouwman, A.S., Taylor, W.T.T., Hagan, R.W., Bromage, S., Tsolmon, S., Trachsel, C., Grossman, J., Littleton, J., Makarewicz, C.A., Krigbaum, J., Burri, M., Scott, A., Davaasambuu, G., Wright, J., Irmer, F., Myagmar, E., Boivin, N., Robbeets, M., Rühli, F., Krause, J., Frohlich, B., Hendy, J., and Warinner, C. (2018) Bronze Age population dynamics and the rise of dairy pastoralism on the eastern Eurasian steppe. Proceedings of the National Academy of Sciences.
- Secord, R., J.I. Bloch, S.G. Chester, D.M. Boyer, A.R. Wood, S.L. Wing, M.J. Kraus, F.A. McInerney, J. Krigbaum. (2012) Evolution of the earliest horses driven by climate change in the Paleocene-Eocene Thermal Maximum. Science 335 (6071), 959–962.
- Barker, G., H. Barton, M. Bird, P. Daly, I. Datan, A. Dykes, L. Farr, D. Gilbertson, B. Harrisson, C. Hunt, T. Higham, L. Kealhofer, J. Krigbaum, H. Lewis, S. McLaren, V. Paz, A. Pike, P. Piper, B. Pyatt, R. Rabett, T. Reynolds, J. Rose, G. Rushworth, M. Stephens, C. Stringer, J. Thompson, C. Turney. (2007). The ‘human revolution’ in lowland tropical Southeast Asia: The antiquity and behavior of anatomically modern humans at Niah Cave (Sarawak, Borneo). Journal of Human Evolution 52, 243–261.
- Krigbaum, John and Ambrose, Stanley H. (eds.) (2003) Bone Chemistry and Bioarchaeology. Journal of Anthropological Archaeology 22, 191–304.
