= Archaeothanatology =

Archaeological sub-discipline

Archaeothanatology is an archaeological theory and multidisciplinary approach related to mortuary archaeology, which aims to reconstruct how people have dealt with the dead in the past. It seeks to comprehend the taphonomic processes that brought to the formation of funerary contexts through the cautious stratigraphic excavation of burials and post-excavation analysis of archaeological and osteological data.

== Theoretical and methodological developments ==
Archaeothanatology as an archaeological and anthropological sub-field was developed especially in France over the last decades of the 20th century. Scholars aimed to outline a method that supported the reconstruction of ancient poorly preserved burials. The novelty of the approach resided in the acknowledgment that the processes of post-mortem body decay, natural factors (such as plant and animal activity), and cultural activities (both intentional and unintentional) contribute to the displacement and preservation of bones and other funerary elements, such as grave goods, within the grave.

Knowledge about the decomposition of body's articulations is a key aspect of archaeothanatological research. Skeleton articulations are commonly classified into labile and persistent joints. Labile joints connect smaller skeletal elements such as those of the hands, feet, and cervical vertebrae, and decompose relatively quickly. Persistent joints, by contrast, connect larger bones and are more resistant to decomposition. By understanding the different chronology of joints disarticulation, it is possible to discern whether the alteration of the skeletons depended on natural or cultural factors. Consequently, scholars are able to reconstruct the depositional and postdepositional activities that formed the body (original position and orientation of the skeleton, reopening of the burial, exhumation, among others).

Therefore, documentation in the field is fundamental to this method, including drawings, photographs, and 3D digital models. Post-fieldwork activities, such as osteological analysis of bones' diagenesis and taphonomy, provide precious information about the formation of ancient burials.
