= 2026 in bioarchaeology =

This page lists significant events in 2026 in bioarchaeology.

== Finds ==
=== January ===
- 6 – Genetic research on skeletal remains from Çayönü Hill in Diyarbakır Province was announced to explore the broader prehistoric sociocultural context of its ancient populations.
- 12 – Archaeologists uncovered an Anglo-Saxon burial ground dating to the 6th–7th centuries during preparatory excavations at the Sizewell C nuclear power station site in Suffolk, England, including high-status burials with grave goods such as weapons, jewellery and a rare horse burial.
- 21 – A Roman cemetery associated with the Roman frontier with several hundred graves, including both inhumation and cremation burials was discovered near Brougham, in northern Britain.

=== February ===
- 6 – Study published in Scientific Reports confirmed definitive evidence of cultural cannibalism occurring 18,000 years ago by re-examining 63 bone fragments from at least 10 individuals including adults and children using advanced 3D scanning and microscopic analysis in Maszycka Cave, southern Poland.
- 11 – Biomechanical experiments demonstrate that different skull fracture patterns are shaped by impact force, angle, and bone properties, helping researchers distinguish between accidental trauma and interpersonal violence in the fossil record.
- 12 – The results of the study was published regarding the discovery of a 4,000-year-old grave in Sudan's Bayuda Desert, which indicates the individual lived in semi-desert conditions and engaged in strenuous physical labor.
- 21 – The completion of the excavation of a 1,200-year-old elite tomb was announced at the El Caño Archaeological Park in the Coclé province, Panama.
- 22 – The discovery of a 4th-century AD Roman grave containing a woman of mixed European and African ancestry was announced at the Western Necropolis of Heraclea Sintica, Bulgaria.
- 23 – A new study revealed a discovery of a 2,800-year-old mass grave containing 77 individuals, primarily women and children, who were victims of a targeted Iron Age massacre Gomolava archaeological site in northern Serbia.

=== March ===
- 1 – The discovery of a prehistoric human skeleton in a submerged cave system on the Yucatán Peninsula, which likely represents an 8,000-year-old burial site was announced in Mexico.
- 11 – Ancient skeletal remains of a young male from the Philippines' Metal Period suffered from a rare combination of debilitating health conditions study revealed.
- 13 – Researchers introduced a new bioarchaeological framework to distinguish between age-related disease and disease-related age, specifically addressing how chronic pathologies can skew skeletal age estimations in ancient populations.
- 17 – The ancient DNA study of Palau revealed that its original settlers 3,000 years ago were already a genetically mixed population of East Asian and Papuan descent, a profile that has remained stable for nearly three millennia.
- 18 – A genomic study of the Southern Andes revealed that ancient communities maintained strong genetic continuity and high-altitude adaptations for over a millennium, utilizing extensive trade and social networks to connect diverse environments long before the arrival of the Inca.
- 25 – During restoration work near the altar of St Peter and Paul Church in Maastricht (Netherlands), a skeleton consistent with accounts of French musketeer Charles de Batz de Castelmore d'Artagnan (killed in battle 1673) is found.

=== April ===
- 10 – Ancient DNA analysis of early Korean burials shows that human sacrifice often involved biologically related individuals, indicating structured practices tied to kinship and social hierarchy.

14

- Researchers identified a rare lower molar with a jadeite inlay from a Guatemalan collection, providing the first evidence of non-cosmetic, potentially restorative dental intervention among the ancient Maya.
- Ancient DNA analysis confirmed that an Anglo-Saxon double burial found in Gloucestershire, England, contained a brother and sister, providing close biological evidence of a simultaneous death and burial customs involving children and high-status weaponry.
- Investigations in Zdanów, Poland, confirmed that a grave site long attributed to a civilian murder victim instead contained the remains of a German soldier, whose identity tag offers a definitive path to verifying his service record and fate.

=== May ===
- 6 – DNA analysis from the University of Waterloo identified four additional crew members of Sir John Franklin’s 1845 Arctic expedition bringing the total number of genetically identified sailors to six.

=== July ===
- 22 – Egyptian archaeologists uncovered a Late and Graeco-Roman funerary complex at the Tell Quesna Necropolis in Monufia, containing human burials, 560 faience ushabti figurines, protective amulets, imported Rhodian pottery, and evidence of Mediterranean trade.
- 23 – Archaeologists excavating Odeion within the Temple of Artemis complex at Ephesus in western Turkey uncovered the carefully constructed Middle Byzantine burial of two newborn infants, possibly twins, inside an abandoned Roman latrine channel.
- 24 – Researchers analyzed ancient proteins preserved in the teeth of Homo naledi from the Rising Star Cave and found that all examined individuals were likely female.

== See also ==
- 2026 in archaeology
- Bioarchaeology in Azerbaijan
