= Dental analysis in archaeology =

The analysis of dental remains is a valuable tool to archaeologists. Teeth are hard, highly mineralised and chemically stable, therefore preserve well and are one of the most commonly found animals remains. Analysis of these remains yields a wealth of information. It can not only be used to determine the sex and age of the individual whose mandibular or dental remains have been found, but can also shed light on their diet, pathology, and even their geographic origins through isotope analysis.

As a result, dental analysis is applied to both the recent and long-dead. It is a crucial part of forensic anthropology in terms of identifying the deceased, and can be applied to archaeological remains to learn about an individual from a burial, or track larger changes in diet of a population if more data is available.

The study of teeth in archaeological contexts is supported by the Dental Anthropology Association, founded in 1986, which publishes the peer-reviewed journal Dental Anthropology.

== Age determination ==
The methods to estimate age based on dentition are divided into two groups; the methods based on the development and growth of teeth that are applied to infants, children and juveniles, and the methods that are based on changes to dentition after formation used to estimate the age of adults.

It is easier to estimate the age of an individual using their dental remains during infancy and childhood than it is during adulthood since the emergence of teeth and their development in young people provide good and relatively reliable indicators of age. Since teeth eruption follows a pattern, with the eruption of deciduous teeth occurring after birth to the end of infancy at the age of two, and permanent teeth erupting between the ages of five and fourteen, observing which teeth are erupted and developing in a mandible, or whether a tooth is deciduous or permanent in isolated remains, can reveal the age of the individual. This evaluation of tooth eruption can be done by viewing images of the dental remains via radiographs, MRIs, and CT scans.

Among adults with fully developed dentition, numerous techniques have been developed for age estimation by looking at various characteristics including periodontosis, cementum apposition, tooth-root translucency, root resorption, secondary dentine deposition and the attrition of the occlusal surface. The tooth-root translucency method was pioneered in the 1990s and involves taking two measurements of a tooth when viewing it under a light, and then placing the values into a formula to gain an age estimation. Another common method involves counting the number of alternating light and dark bands in the cementum. Methods based on post-formation changes rely more on microscopic observations. A more holistic approach can be taken to assess the overall wear of the teeth, for example using the Brothwell chart of 1963. Assessing teeth wear is common due its reliable indicator of age than signs of wear in bones.

== Sex determination ==
The simplest methods of estimating the sex of an individual are based on common differences in size between the teeth of male and female individuals. The dimensions measured are the mesiodistal and buccolingual dimensions, and are commonly applied to the mandibular canines which show the greatest sexual dimorphism, but premolars and some molars and maxillary incisors also show size differences between males and females. Other morphological differences can be used to support sex estimation, for example by comparing the frequencies of discrete traits such as the deflecting wrinkle of the lower first molars and the distal accessory ridge of the canines. These nonmetric dental traits are typically recorder using the Turner-Scott Dental Anthropology System (formerly the Arizona State University Dental Anthropology System, or ASUDAS), which provides standardized reference plaques and scoring procedures for over 40 crown and root traits, enabling systematic comparison of dental morphological variation across populations. One potential problem with these forms of morphological identification, aside from the fact that the variation in teeth is continuous, is that the possibility of mistakes increases in cases where the morphology of the teeth has been altered by taphonomic processes.

More advanced methods for sex determination involve DNA analysis, in which DNA extracted from dental pulp can be amplified using the polymerase chain reaction and then analysed. However this is a destructive process that tends to destroy the sample, either via the cryogenic grinding, or the opening of the root canals to extract the pulp. Protein enamel analysis is another molecular technique in which different signatures of amelogenin in males and female individuals provides the basis of sex estimation.

== Population affinity ==
Dental morphological traits can also be used to estimate the population affinity of skeletal remains. Certain nonmetric traits occur at significantly different frequencies across major geographic populations. For example, incisor shoveling is found at higher frequencies in East Asian and Indigenous American populations, while Carabelli's cusp is more common in European-derived populations. These patterns of dental morphological variation reflect underlying genetic differences between populations and have been used to trace migration routes and population relationships, including the three-wave model of migration into the Americas proposed by Turner.

== Diet and disease ==
Since dental apparatus comes into direct contact with the foods consumed, teeth provide direct and some of the best evidence for the diet that an individual ate in life. The analysis of features on the teeth and jaws such as cavities, hypoplasias and striations can all reveal the foods that were consumed.

Starting with cavities, usually the result of high-sugar and high-carbohydrate diets, the prevalence of cavities in dental remains suggests the existence of such foods in the diet. Dental analysis of skeletal remains of hunter-gatherers in Morocco from 15,000 -13,700 years BP revealed a diet that was high in starchy foods may have caused high rates of tooth decay seen in the population. When inferring a high-carbohydrate and sugar diet from the prevalence of cavities, it is necessary to consider other factors that may increase the severity of dental diseases such as the immune system of the individual. If it is already impaired by other infections then cavities and signs of dental diseases will be more prevalent, thus such features should not automatically be attributed to just more sugar consumption.

Enamel hypoplasia is the result of disturbances in the enamel, and can take the form of thinner or missing areas of enamel, lines, furrows and pits. Most enamel hypoplasias are the result of external, negative, environmental conditions, like poor nutrition and diseases, and as a result they can tell us about the lifestyle of the individual. Metabolic disorders resulting from poor diet or disease have a particularly significant effect on enamel, and a range of other non-specific diseases can cause the feature, such as measles, diphtheria and deficiency in vitamin A, D and C. The identification of enamel hypoplasias is best done with microscopic analysis of tooth thin sections. The position of the hypoplasia on the tooth can also tell you when childhood stress caused disruption in the tooth enamel occurred by measuring the distance from the hypoplasia to the cemento-enamel junction since the enamel does not remodel once formed.

When there is a large sample size, tracking changes in dentition over many generations can show how diets and lifestyles changed, this line of inquiry has been successful in many cases. An example that looked at enamel hypoplasia was conducted by Starling and Stock who examined the hypoplasias of five populations in the Nile Valley from different time periods. The population from 13,0000 to 15,000BCE had fewer hypoplasias that the proto-agriculturalist population of 5000-4000 BCE, which demonstrates that the period in which early agriculture emerged was one with high levels of stress. In a similar vein, dental remains of a population from Roman Cibalae were analysed and revealed a significantly higher frequency of enamel hypoplasias in females than males. This has been interpreted as showing that women in the area were worse off in terms of diet and disease.

Some hypoplasias are related to inherited conditions. Stress is not the sole cause. Additionally, when hypoplasias do occur, the severity of the hypopplasia does not directly correlate to the severity of stress - characteristics such as tooth morphology, enamel structure, developmental timing and speed are all factors as well. As a result, it is necessary to use multiple teeth types to infer the stress that an individual may have experienced.

Tooth wear is another feature of dental remains that can be analysed to infer past diets. Wear that is the result of natural contact between upper and lower teeth is called attrition, and wear that is the result of external objects like food coming into contact with the teeth is called abrasion. Wear is further subdivided into that which is studied and seen with the naked eye (macrowear), and that which is studied and seen with a microscope (microwear). This microwear constitutes the pits and scratches seen on the enamel surface, and different patterns of microwear can occur as a result of different diets.

Some of the most conspicuous microwear constitutes chips in the teeth seen in irregular surfaces, in contrast to crown wear which is more gradual and incremental. Chipping usually occurs when the enamel cannot withstand the force exerted by the jaws, and as a result can cause tooth fracture, particularly when a foreign element is between the teeth. Causes, therefore, include inclusions within food, such as a bit of grit or bone, or more commonly today, actions like biting your nails or chewing a pen. Injuries and force also cause dental trauma like this. In relation to inferred diet, chipping can suggest inclusions within a meal, potentially bits of loose grindstone making its way into the finished cereal, studies have also shown that hunter-gatherers have more chipping on their molars, whilst agricultural communities have the highest frequencies of chippings on the incisors.

Moving to microwear, pits are microscopic cracks in the structure of the enamel that are the result of hard particles being driven into the tooth surface that cause tiny bits of the enamel to fracture off. Harder foods require more force when chewing to grind down the foods, and as a result they result in more pits whilst the consumption of softer foods creates more scratches on the enamel. Tough but soft foods also create scratches as opposing surfaces slide past each other during mastication. When analysing microwear the most common technique involve the use of an electron microscope, but white light confocal microscopes can be used to observe the enamel on the tooth surface.

At the site of Abu Hureyra in Syria, scanning electron microscope photos were taken of teeth from Mesolithic and Neolithic layers and patterns of microwear were analysed. This revealed that the food eaten in the Neolithic was harder and coarser, reflecting a switch from the small grained seeds eaten in the Mesolithic to the large grained cereals that were dominant in the Neolithic, as well as the switch from roots and wild grains to domesticated cereals. There is also a change between the 2a and 2b Neolithic layers at Abu Hureyra, with teeth from the later layers showing less attrition, potentially due to a change in food preparation, or potentially due to the shift to the consumption of more domesticated meats.

Stable isotope analysis is the final category of dental analysis for diet that can be considered, as the usual techniques of isotope analysis applied to bones to infer diet, can also be applied to teeth. Carbon, nitrogen, oxygen and strontium are the most commonly studied. A common technique is to distinguish a C3-based diet from a C4-based diet based on the ratio of the carbon isotopes ^{13}C and ^{12}C that are found within the hydroxyapatite. Consumption of plants that use the C3 pathway in photosynthesis, like most temperate zone vegetation, incorporate less ^{13}C into their tissues than plants that use the C4 pathways, including many tropical and savanna grasses. The use of these stable isotopes have shown the increasing importance of millet and rice at a Neolithic site in Shandong, China. Nitrogen isotopes are also commonly studied as they can suggest an agricultural or marine-based diet since the ratio of ^{15}N to ^{14}N increases higher up the food chain.

Strontium and oxygen isotope ratios in hydroxyapatite have been used to study the geographical origins and movements of ancient people too. Strontium isotope ratios vary in different types of rock and soil, so there are differences in isotopic ratios in plants and animals living in regions with different geology as a result.

The possibilities of using dental calculus for analysis has been increasingly recognised and it can be used for both stable isotope and DNA analysis. One of its main benefits is that it is a secondary material and not an inherent part of the skeletal remains, and as a result people may be less hesitant to use it for such analysis, since those techniques destroy and damage the sample. Additionally, you can get both macrofossils and microfossils trapped in calculus; fragments of cereals, fibres and even phytoliths can all be found in calculus, making it a useful tool for reconstructing past diets

== See also ==
- Biological Anthropology
- Forensic dentistry
- Bioarchaeology
- Paleopathology
- Isotope analysis
- Dental anthropology
