= Biological distance analysis =

Methological approach in anthropology

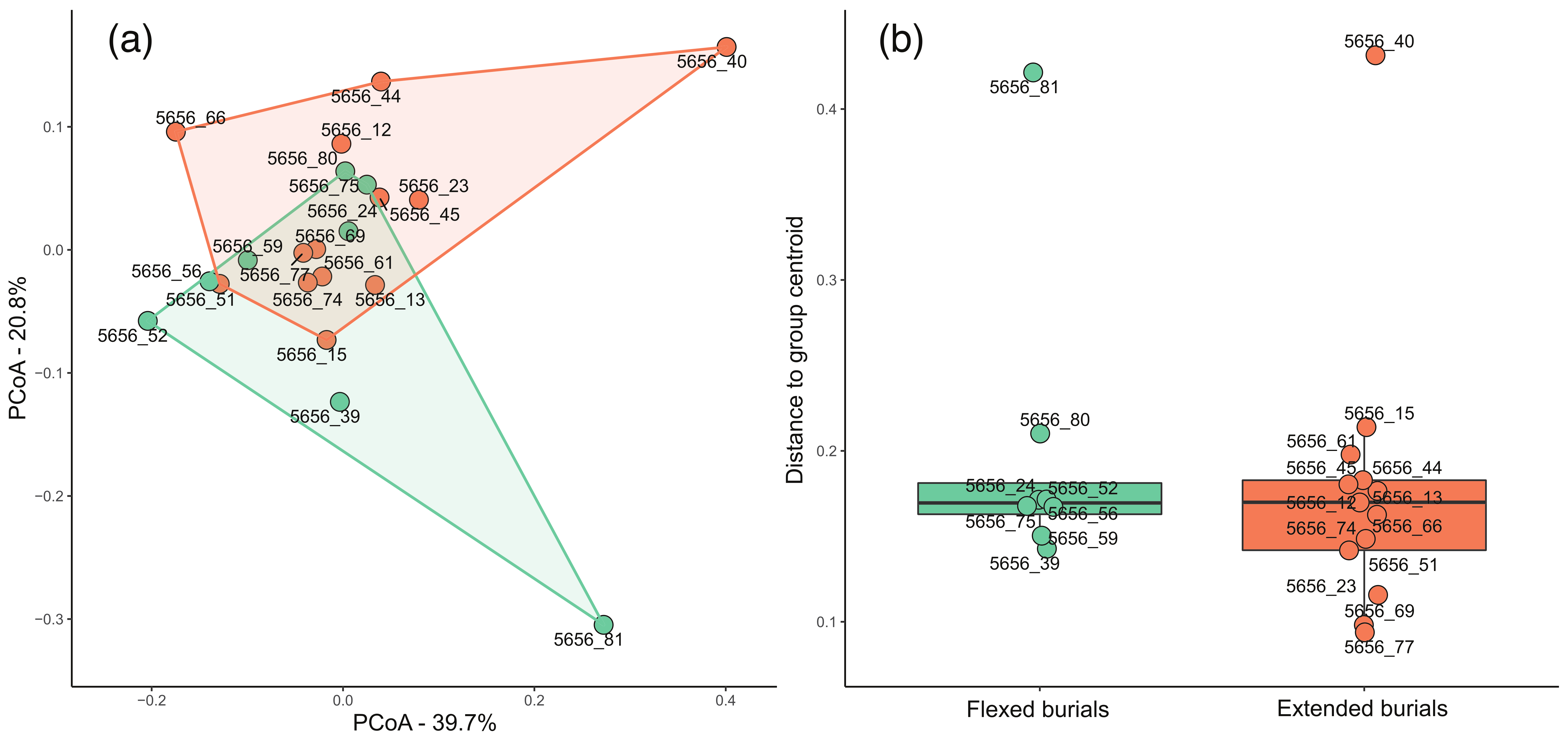
Biological distances among human skeletal remains buried in flexed and extended positions at the ancient Greek colony of Chersonesos (5th to 4th century BC), estimated with Gower coefficients based on craniodental morphology.

Biological distance analysis (also known as biodistance analysis) is a methodological approach used primarily in biological anthropology, bioarchaeology, and forensic anthropology to infer genetic similarity or difference among deceased humans based on skeletal traits. It is commonly used when ancient DNA (aDNA) is poorly preserved or when destructive sampling is not feasible for ethical or curatorial reasons. Biodistance studies contribute to our understanding of phylogeny, migration, kinship, and ancestry.

== Historical background ==
The study of skeletal morphological variation to identify group relationships has a long history, dating back to the 18th century. Early work focused primarily on categorizing global human variation based on cranial anatomy using racial typology. In the 1970s, influenced by the New Archaeology movement, biodistance studies were repurposed to focus on reconstructing population structure and history within archaeological contexts. Modern biodistance research rejects typological thinking in favor of emphasizing within-population variability. Recent methodological advances in computing, statistics, and 3D scanning have further refined these analyses by enabling more accurate assessments of multivariate variation within a population and quantitative genetics framework. In the 21st century, the field has increasingly integrated genetic data, including mitochondrial DNA, Y-chromosome markers, and autosomal DNA sequences, to complement traditional morphological approaches.

== Data and methods ==
The method is closely related to archaeogenetics but differs in that it uses skeletal morphological features rather than molecular data. Cranial and dental traits are typically favored because they are highly heritable and shaped primarily by neutral evolution. The four most widely used data types are craniometrics, odontometrics, cranial nonmetric traits, and dental nonmetric traits collected via the Arizona State University Dental Anthropology System (ASUDAS). The rationale for using these traits as proxies for genetic relatedness stems from heritability studies. A study published in 2023 found that ASUDAS dental nonmetric traits are among the most informative morphological markers for biodistance analysis, significantly outperforming other commonly used data types.

Biodistance analyses have been used to assess genetic relationships both between individuals and among populations, with applications ranging from local studies within archaeological sites to broad comparisons across continents. The degree of similarity or dissimilarity is typically quantified using mathematical distance functions, such as the Mahalanobis distance, Smith's Mean Measure of Divergence, and the Gower distance. For visualization, biodistance studies often employ ordination techniques, such as multidimensional scaling (MDS), as well as hierarchical clustering methods like the unweighted pair group method with arithmetic mean (UPGMA).

== Applications ==
=== Bioarchaeology ===
In bioarchaeology, biological distance analysis is used to study kinship, migration, post-marital residence patterns, and population structure in ancient societies. Some examples are listed below:

- In 2007, a large-scale biodistance study examined the population structure of Classic period (250–900 AD) Maya populations through analysis of odontometric variation from 12 archaeological sites across Mexico, Guatemala, Belize, and Honduras.
- A 2022 study used biodistance analysis to test whether burials in flexed and extended positions at the ancient Greek colony of Chersonesos (5th to 4th century BC) represented different ancestral groups, as suggested by archaeological evidence.
- A 2023 study used biodistance analysis employing dental nonmetric traits to understand the biological relationship among Iron Age Celtic groups in Central and Southern Europe.

=== Forensic anthropology ===
In forensic contexts, biodistance analysis can support the identification of unknown individuals by estimating ancestry and assessing familial relationships. Some examples are listed below:

- In 2005, the widely used computer program FORDISC 3.0 was introduced to estimate the ancestry of modern human skeletal remains using discriminant function analysis of cranial measurements.
- A 2014 study explored the utility of mesiodistal and buccolingual tooth dimensions for assessing the ancestry profile of unidentified individuals.
- In 2018, a study introduced the web-based application rASUDAS, which estimates the ancestry of unknown individuals based on their set of ASUDAS tooth crown and root traits.

=== Paleoanthropology ===
In paleoanthropology, biodistance data can help elucidate hominin phylogeny, population dispersals, and past admixture events. Some examples are listed below:

- A biodistance study published in 2015 illuminated the complex phylogenetic relationships among several hominin species using a large set of craniodental characters.
- In 2018, a biodistance study evaluated the dental morphological affinities of Homo naledi (Dinaledi Chamber of the Rising Star cave system, South Africa) in comparison to several other hominin species from Africa, providing additional support for the taxonomic validity of Homo naledi as a distinct species of Homo.
- A study in 2024 applied biodistance analysis to fossil dental remains to test different scenarios about the hunter-gatherer population history of Upper Paleolithic Europe, concluding that the Last Glacial Maximum caused a severe population bottleneck and turnover.

== See also ==
- Biological anthropology
- Bioarchaeology
- Paleoanthropology
- Forensic anthropology
- Craniometry
- Human migration
- Population genetics
- Archaeogenetics
