= Jane E. Buikstra =

American anthropologist

Jane Ellen Buikstra
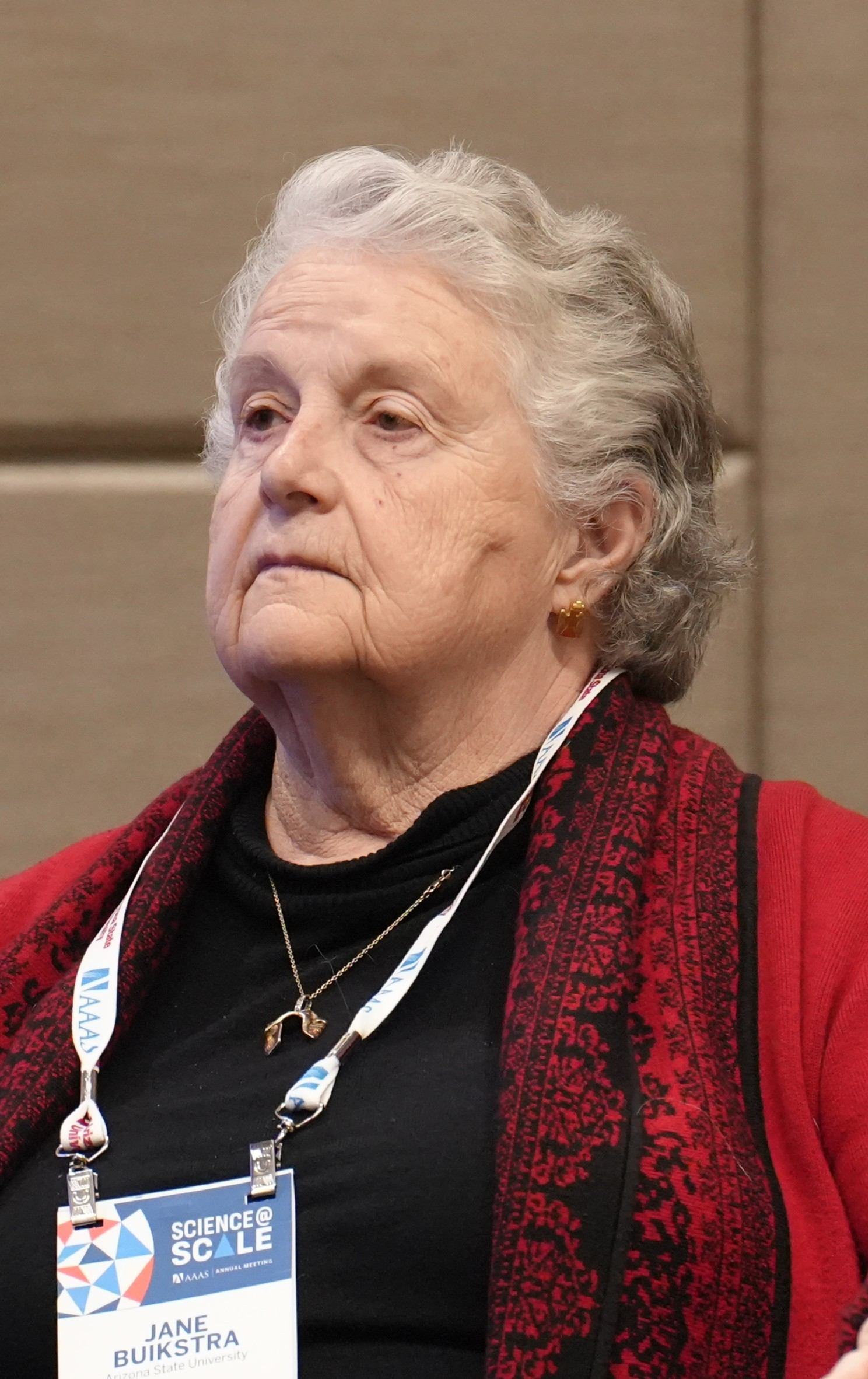
- Born: November 2, 1945 (age 80); Evansville, Indiana
- Education: University of Chicago; DePauw University
- Scientific career
- Fields: Anthropology; Paleopathology; Bioarchaeology
- Thesis: Hopewell in the Lower Illinois River Valley: A Regional Approach to the Study of Biological Variability and Mortuary Activity (1972)

Jane Ellen Buikstra (born 1945) is an American anthropologist and bioarchaeologist. Her 1977 article on the biological dimensions of archaeology coined and defined the field of bioarchaeology in the US as the application of biological anthropological methods to the study of archaeological problems. She has authored over 20 books and 150 articles. Buikstra's research focuses on an analysis of the Phaleron cemetery near Athens, Greece.

== Biography ==
Buikstra earned a bachelor's degree in Anthropology from DePauw University, Indiana in 1967 and her Masters and PhD degrees, also in Anthropology, from the University of Chicago. She is a Diplomate of the American Board of Forensic Anthropology and sat on the board of directors for the year 1999–2000. She has served as faculty at Northwestern University, University of Chicago, and the University of New Mexico. Buikstra was previously Leslie Spier Distinguished Professor of Anthropology at the University of New Mexico. She served as Professor and Director of the Center for Bioarchaeological Research, a unit within the School of Human Evolution and Social Change at Arizona State University, from 2005 to 2014.

Buikstra is on advisory board of the peer-reviewed International Journal of Palaeopathology and President of the Center for American Archeology in Kampsville, Illinois.

She has been a member of the Academy of National Sciences since 1987 and in 2019, she was elected into the American Academy of Arts and Sciences.

=== Fieldwork ===
- North American Midwest, 18 Projects, 1966-
- Canadian Arctic, 1 Project, 1969
- Argentina, Santa Fe la Vieja, 1980–1982, 1984, 1987
- Brazil, Marajo Expedition, 1983–1986
- Peru, Programa Contisuyu, 1984-
- Spain, Gatas Expedition, 1986-
- Turkey, Çayönü Tepesi, 1988
- Honduras, 1995-2004

== Selected publications ==
- Jane E. Buikstra, Douglas Ubelaker eds. Standards for Data Collection from Human Skeletal Remains: Proceedings of a Seminar at the Field Museum of Natural History. Arkansas Archaeological Survey Press, Fayetteville, (1994).
- Jane E. Buikstra. “Tombs for the Living . . . or For the Dead: The Osmore Ancestors". In Tombs for the Ancestors, T. Dillehay, ed., Dumbarton Oaks Research Library and Collection, Washington, D.C. pp. 229–280 (1995).
- Jane E. Buikstra, “Studying Maya Bioarchaeology.” in Bones of the Maya: Studies of Ancient Skeletons, Steve Whittington and D. M. Reed, eds., Smithsonian Press, pp. 221–228 (1997).
- Jane E. Buikstra, Douglas K. Charles and Gordon F. M. Rakita, Staging Ritual: Hopewell Ceremonialism at the Mound House Site, Greene County, Illinois. Center for American Archeology, Kampsville Studies in Archeology and History, No. 1 (1998).
- Jane E. Buikstra and Douglas K. Charles. “Centering the Ancestors: Cemeteries, Mounds and Sacred Landscapes of the North American Midcontinent.” in Archaeologies of Landscape: Contemporary Perspectives, W. Ashmore and B. Knapp, eds. Blackwells pp. 201–228 (1999).
- Jane E. Buikstra, Editor and author of five substantive chapters. Never Anything So Solemn: An Archaeological, Biological and Historical Investigation of the 19th Century Grafton Cemetery. Author of four chapters:1. Introduction, 2. Historic Bioarcheology and the Beautification of Death, 3. A Matter of Life and Death I: Disease, Medical Practice, and Funerals, 9. Summary and Conclusions, and coauthor of one chapter (Houdek, Buikstra, Stojanowski) 7. Skeletal Biology. Center for American Archeology, Kampsville Studies in Archeology and History, No. 3 (2000).
- Jane E. Buikstra (with Maria Cecilia Lozada). El Señorío de Chiribaya en la Costa Sur del Perú. Instituto de Estudios Peruanos, Lima-Peru (2002).
- Jane E. Buikstra (with Charlotte A. Roberts). The Bioarchaeology of Tuberculosis: A Global View on a Reemerging Disease. University of Florida Press (2003).
- Jane E. Buikstra and Kenneth C. Nystrom. “Embodied Traditions: The Chachapoya and Inka Ancestors.” in Theory, Method, and Practice in Modern Archaeology. R. J. Jeske and D. K. Charles, eds. Praeger Publishers: Westport (2003).
- Jane E. Buikstra, TD Price, JHBurton, and LEWright. “Tombs from Copan’s Acropolis: A Life History Approach.” in Understanding Early Classic Copan. Ellen E. Bell, Marcello A. Canuto, and Robert J. Sharer, eds., Chapter 1. pp. 191–212. Philadelphia: University of Pennsylvania Museum of Archaeology and Anthropology (2004).
- Jane E. Buikstra. “Ethnogenesis and Ethnicity in the Andes.” in Us and Them: The Assignation of Ethnicity in the Andean Region, Methodological Approaches. Richard Reycraft, ed., Chapter 14, pp. 233–238. Los Angeles: Cotsen Institute of Archaeology, UCLA (2005).
- Jane E. Buikstra. “History of Research in Skeletal Biology” in Handbook of the North American Indians, Physical Anthropology, Douglas Ubelaker, ed. Smithsonian Institution Press, Washington D.C., pp. 504–523. (2006)
- Jane E. Buikstra, G. R. Milner and J. L. Boldsen. Janaab' Pakal: The Age-at-death Controversy Re-revisited. in Janaab' Pakal of Palenque: Reconstructing the Life and Death of a Maya Ruler. V. Tiesler and A Cucina, eds. University of Arizona Press. (2006)
- Jane E. Buikstra and Lane A. Beck, eds., Bioarchaeology: The Contextual Study of Human Remains. Senior editor and author of Chapter 1: An Historical Introduction; Chapter 15: Repatriation: Challenges and Opportunities; co-author of O. M. Pearson and Jane E. Buikstra, Chapter 8: Behavior and the Bones Mary Lucas Powell, Della Collins Cook, Georgieann Bogdan, Jane E. Buikstra, Mario M. Castro, Patrick D. Horne, David R. Hunt, Richard T. Koritzer, Sheila Ferraz Mendonça de Souza, Mary Kay Sandford, Laurie Saunders, Glaucia Aparecida Malerba Sene, Lynne Sullivan, and John J. Swetnam Chapter 7 Invisible Hands: Women in Bioarchaeology. Elsevier Press, Inc. (2006)
- Jane E. Buikstra. "The Bioarchaeology of Maya Sacrifice." in New Perspectives on Maya Sacrifice, V. Tiesler and A. Cucina, eds, Chapter 13, pp. 293–307. Springer-Verlag (2007).
- Debra Komar and Jane E. Buikstra, Forensic Anthropology: Contemporary Theory and Practice. Oxford University Press (2007).
