= Periodontosis =

- Specialty: Dentistry

Periodontosis is an obsolete term that was used to describe what was once thought to be certain type of unique and distinguishable chronic periodontal disease that manifested as degenerative bony changes without concomitant inflammation. Although utilized for more than 50 years, the term has since been dropped in favor of a more contemporary disease classification for periodontal disease.

Described by Gottlieb as a "diffuse atrophy of the alveolar bone," the term periodontosis was later applied and it gained acceptance as a disease entity, being defined as:

"a degenerative, noninflammatory destruction of the periodontium, originating in one or more of the periodontal structures and characterized by migrating and loosening of the teeth in the presence or absence of secondary epithelial proliferation and pocket formation or secondary gingival disease."

Noted as a rare disease, periodontosis was said to have been seen primarily in young patients. And despite being defined as being a "noninflammatory destruction of the periodontium," almost all cases did exhibit varying degrees of gingival inflammation.
