= ASUDAS =

References system for human tooth morphology

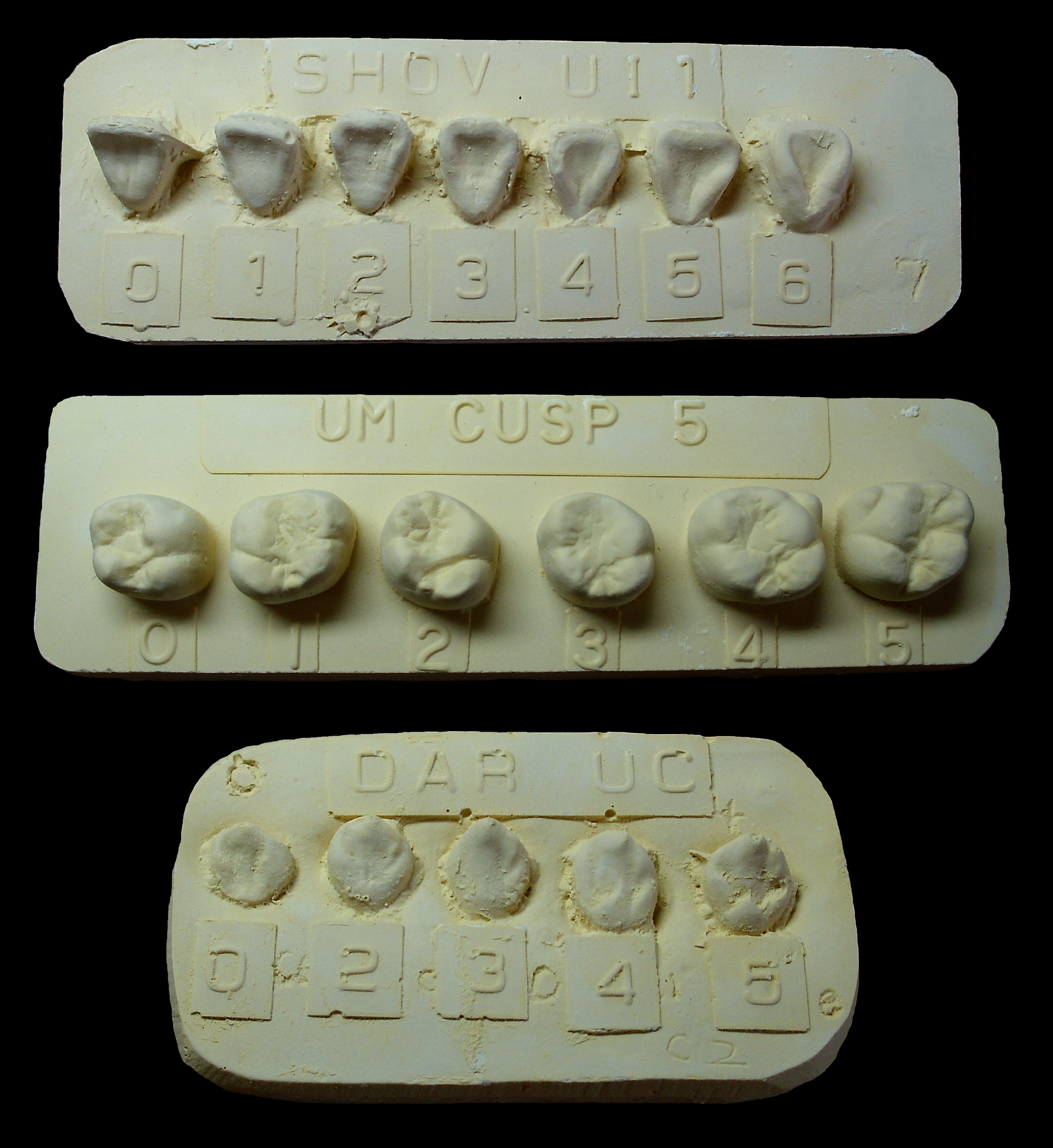
Reference plaques of the ASUDAS illustrating human tooth crown and root shape variants

The ASUDAS (Arizona State University Dental Anthropology System) is a reference system for collecting data on human tooth morphology and variation created by Christy G. Turner II, Christian R. Nichol, and G. Richard Scott. The ASUDAS gives detailed descriptions for common crown and root shape variants and their different degrees of expression. It also comprises a set of reference plaques illustrating dental variants as well as showing their expression levels in 3D. The ASUDAS was designed to ensure a standardized scoring procedure with minimum error in order to warrant comparability between data collected by different observers.

The ASUDAS currently comprises a set of 42 dental variants that can be observed in the permanent adult dentition. The majority are crown and root shape variants, although the system also includes some skeletal variants of the maxilla and mandible. Most of the variants occur at different frequencies in human populations around the world. Examples of dental variants listed in the ASUDAS are shovel-shaped incisors, Carabelli cusps, or hypocones.

== Genetics ==
It is hypothesized that most of the dental variants listed in the ASUDAS are heritable and selectively neutral and that the worldwide dental diversity was generated by random evolutionary processes consisting of founder effects and genetic drift. Several studies have also demonstrated that genetic distances across modern human populations derived from neutrally evolving SNPs or microsatellites are highly correlated with distances derived from dental variants listed in the ASUDAS. Additionally, dental variation within populations decreases with increasing geographical distance from Africa, a signature also found in neutral genetic datasets as a result of a serial founder effect originating in Africa.

Some dental variants listed in the ASUDAS are also likely to be associated with non-neutral evolutionary processes, such as natural selection. For example, shoveling and double-shoveling of upper first incisors and the presence of hypoconulids of lower second molars have been found to be linked to the ectodysplasin A receptor gene (EDAR). EDAR is a functional genomic region and has a range of pleiotropic effects on ectodermally derived structures, such as hair, mammary glands, and teeth, and is most likely under positive selection in Asian populations. It is possible that dental variants linked to EDAR are not direct targets of positive selection but rather 'hitchhiking' when selection acts on another phenotype.

== Applications ==
The enamel which covers a tooth crown is the hardest tissue in the human body and generally well preserved in taphonomic contexts, even when associated skeletal and DNA preservation is relatively poor. Therefore, dental morphological data collected with the ASUDAS are commonly employed in biological distance analysis to infer the biogeographical origin of deceased humans when no other biological markers are available. For example, ASUDAS data are typically used for identifying unknown individuals in forensic cases, for examining past migration and mobility in bioarchaeological contexts, and for reconstructing hominin phylogenies in paleoanthropological studies.

As a rule of thumb, dental inferences about neutral genetic affinities based on many ASUDAS variants are more reliable than those based on only a few variants. Nevertheless, the best performance is achieved when using specific combinations of highly diagnostic variants, and not the full ASUDAS set.

A study conducted in 2023 found that ASUDAS variants are among the most informative morphological markers in the human skeleton for inferring underlying neutral genetic relatedness among populations, significantly outperforming other commonly employed data types, such as cranial non-metric and dental metric variables, for instance.

== See also ==
- Biological distance analysis
- Biological Anthropology
- Bioarchaeology
- Paleoanthropology
- Forensic Anthropology
