= Christy G. Turner II =

American anthropologist (1933–2013)

- Born: Christy G. Turner II; November 28, 1933; Columbia, Missouri
- Died: July 27, 2013 (aged 79); Tempe, Arizona, U.S.
- Education: Bachelor of Anthropology (1957); Master of Anthropology (1958); Doctorate in Anthropology (1967)
- Alma mater: University of Wisconsin
- Occupation: Anthropologist
- Known for: Anthropology
- Notable work: Elevating the dental nonmetric traits importance in Biological anthropology studies.
- Partner(s): Jacqueline Adams Turner (died); Olga V. Pavlova
- Children: Kali Holtschlag (Michael), Kimi Turner, and Korri Turner (John Rockhill)
- Parent(s): Christy G. Turner, Sr – Katherine Metz Turner

Christy G. Turner II (November 28, 1933, Columbia, Missouri – July 27, 2013, Tempe, Arizona) was an American anthropologist known for his research on dental anthropology, perimortem taphonomy, and his theories about the populating of the American continent in three migrating waves from Northeast Asia, which received support from genetic research. Turner's work spanned all the fields of Anthropology (physical anthropology, archaeology, linguistics and sociocultural anthropology), and his fieldwork included exploring the interaction between humans and animals during the Ice Age in Siberia and taking dental casts of indigenous peoples in the Aleutian Islands.

Turner graduated from Van Nuys High School and received his BA and MA from the University of Arizona (1957, 1958), followed in 1967 by a PhD in anthropology from the University of Wisconsin. Turner taught at Arizona State University as an assistant professor in 1966 and worked there for forty years, becoming an associate dean of the ASU Graduate College from 1971 to 1977 and ending his tenure as a Regents Professor Emeritus, retiring in 2004.

Turner joined his wife, Jacqueline Adams Turner, in studying evidence for cannibalism among the Anasazi, and developed a controversial set of six criteria for determining whether human cannibalism was likely to have occurred, based on analysis of archaeological remains.

== Family ==
Turner was married for forty years to Jacqueline Adams Turner, who preceded him in death. He then married Olga V. Pavlova who had two daughters from a previous marriage. Turner and Jacqueline had three daughters, Kali Holtschlag (Michael), Kimi Turner, and Korri Turner (John Rockhill).

== Selected publications ==
- Turner, Christy G.; Jacqueline A. Turner (2011). Man Corn: Cannibalism and Violence in the Prehistoric American Southwest. University of Utah Press. p. 552. ISBN 9780874809688.
- Turner, Christy G.; G. Richard Scott (2000). The Anthropology of Modern Human Teeth: Dental Morphology and Its Variation in Recent Human Populations. Cambridge University Press. p. 408. ISBN 9780521784535.
- Turner, Christy G.; Nicolai D. Ovodov; Olga V. Pavlova (2013). Animal Teeth and Human Tools: A Taphonomic Odyssey in Ice Age Siberia. Cambridge University Press. p. 490. ISBN 9781107030299.
