= Bioarchaeology =

Sub-discipline of archaeology

Bioarchaeology (osteoarchaeology, osteology or palaeo-osteology) in Europe describes the study of biological remains from archaeological sites. In the United States it is the scientific study of human remains from archaeological sites.

The term was minted by British archaeologist Grahame Clark who, in 1972, defined it as the study of animal and human bones from archaeological sites. Jane Buikstra came up with the current US definition in 1977. Human remains can inform about health, lifestyle, diet, mortality and physique of the past. Although Clark used it to describe just human remains and animal remains, increasingly archaeologists include botanical remains.

Bioarchaeology was largely born from the practices of New Archaeology, which developed in the United States in the 1970s as a reaction to a mainly cultural-historical approach to understanding the past. Proponents of New Archaeology advocate testing hypotheses about the interaction between culture and biology, or a biocultural approach. Some archaeologists advocate a more holistic approach that incorporates critical theory.

== Paleodemography ==
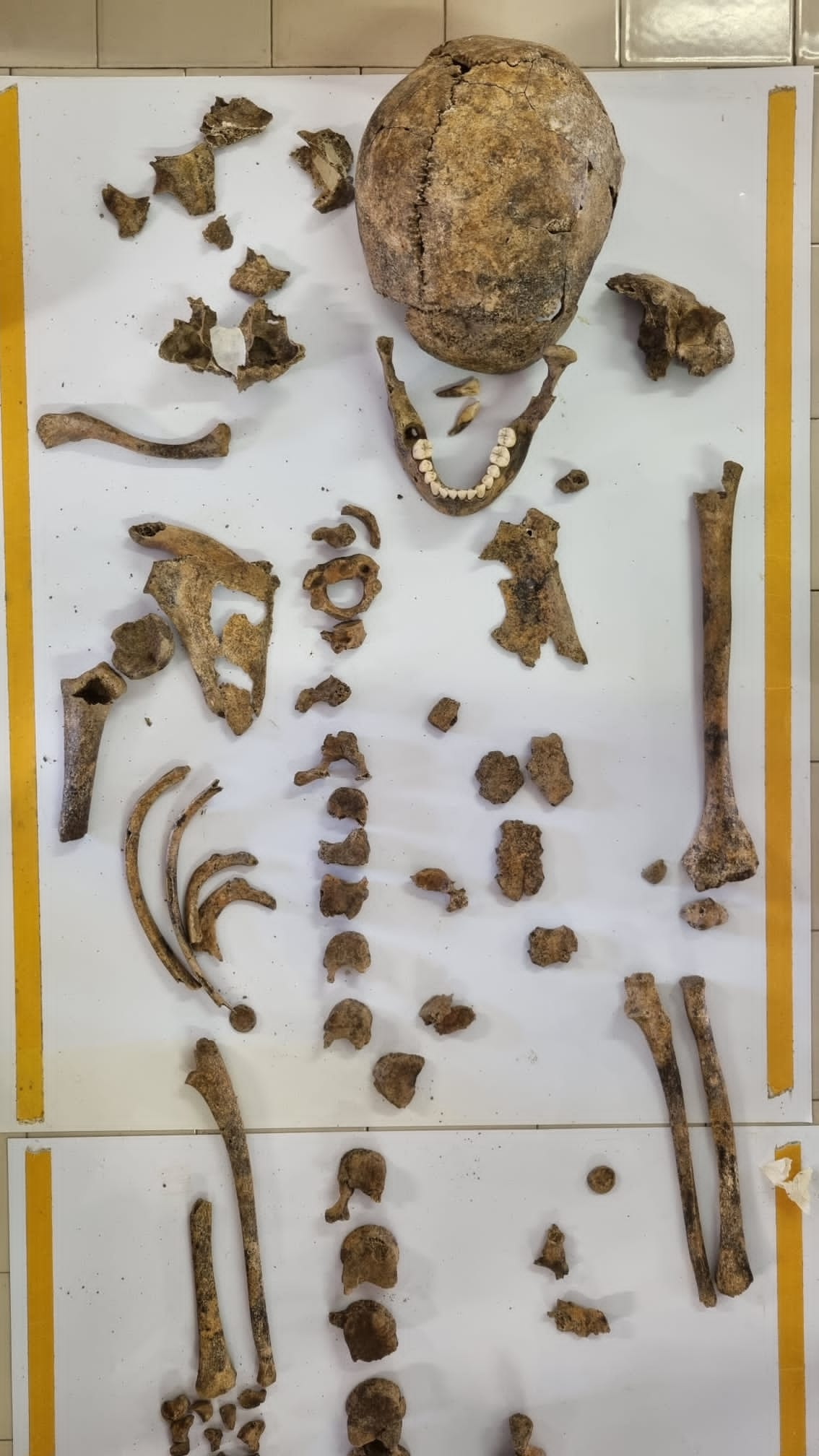
A skeleton in a bioarchaeology lab

Paleodemography studies demographic characteristics of past populations. Bioarchaeologists use paleodemography to create life tables, a type of cohort analysis, to understand demographic characteristics (such as risk of death or sex ratio) of a given age cohort within a population. It is often necessary to estimate the age and sex of individuals based on specific morphological characteristics of the skeleton.

=== Age ===
Age estimation attempts to determine the skeletal/biological age-at-death. The primary assumption is that an individual's skeletal age is closely associated with their chronological age. Age estimation can be based on patterns of growth and development or degenerative changes in the skeleton. A variety of skeletal series methods to assess these types of changes have been developed. For instance, in children age is typically estimated by assessing dental development, ossification and fusion of specific skeletal elements, or long bone length. For children, different teeth erupt from the gums serially are the most reliable for telling a child's age. However, fully developed teeth are less indicative. In adults, degenerative changes to the pubic symphysis, the auricular surface of the ilium, the sternal end of the 4th rib, and dental attrition are commonly used to estimate skeletal age.

Until the age of about 30, human bones keep growing. Different bones fuse at different points of growth. This development can vary across individuals. Wear and tear on bones further complicates age estimates. Often, estimates are limited to 'young' (20–35 years), 'middle' (35–50 years), or 'old' (50+ years).

=== Sex ===
Differences in male and female skeletal anatomy are used by bioarchaeologists to determine the biological sex of human skeletons. Humans are sexually dimorphic, although overlap in body shape and sexual characteristics is possible. Not all skeletons can be assigned a sex, and some may be wrongly identified. Biological males and biological females differ most in the skull and pelvis; bioarchaeologists focus on these body parts, although other body parts can be used. The female pelvis is generally broader than the male pelvis, and the angle between the two inferior pubic rami (the sub-pubic angle) is wider and more U-shaped, while the sub-pubic angle of the male is more V-shaped and less than 90 degrees.

In general, the male skeleton is more robust than the female skeleton because of male's greater muscles mass. Male skeletons generally have more pronounced brow ridges, nuchal crests, and mastoid processes. Skeletal size and robustness are influenced by nutrition and activity levels. Pelvic and cranial features are considered to be more reliable indicators of biological sex. Sexing skeletons of young people who have not completed puberty is more difficult and problematic, because the body has not fully developed.

Bioarchaeological sexing of skeletons is not error-proof. Recording errors and re-arranging of human remains may play a part in such misidentification.

Direct testing of bioarchaeological methods for sexing skeletons by comparing gendered names on coffin plates from the crypt at Christ Church, Spitalfields, London to the associated remains achieved a 98 percent success rate.

Gendered work patterns may leave marks on bones and be identifiable in the archaeological record. One study found extremely arthritic big toes, a collapse of the last dorsal vertebrae, and muscular arms and legs among female skeletons at Abu Hureyra, interpreting this as indicative of gendered work patterns. Such skeletal changes could have resulted from women spending long periods kneeling while grinding grain with the toes curled forward. Investigation of gender from mortuary remains is of growing interest to archaeologists.

=== Modern sex determination methods ===
Recent developments in bioarchaeological methods have introduced more accurate and standardized techniques for sex estimation, especially when skeletal preservation is poor. Metric analyses of pelvic morphology using tools such as the Diagnose Sexuelle Probabiliste (DSP) method have achieved over 95% accuracy in adult individuals when analyzing the os coxae, using discriminant functions based on population-specific reference data. Geometric morphometric analyses of cranial and pelvic landmarks, particularly when paired with statistical classifiers or machine learning algorithms, have also shown high success rates in identifying sex across both forensic and archaeological samples. Molecular techniques have also become integrated into bioarchaeological practice. Ancient DNA (aDNA) shotgun sequencing enables near-perfect sex determination by quantifying X- and Y-chromosome reads, proving especially valuable when osteological indicators are absent or ambiguous. Where DNA preservation is insufficient, dental proteomics as detected amelogenin peptides in tooth enamel provide a minimally destructive and highly reliable alternative for sex estimation.

== Non-specific stress indicators ==
=== Dental non-specific stress indicators ===
Dental non-specific stress indicators are features found on teeth that reflect episodes of physiological stress experienced during childhood, particularly during the period of enamel formation. They are described as "non-specific" because, while they signal that a stress event occurred, they do not identify the exact cause, such as whether it resulted from malnutrition, illness, or infection.

Enamel forms through a process called amelogenesis, carried out by specialized cells known as ameloblasts, which produce enamel in sequential layers. When these cells are affected by systemic stress, the enamel formation process can be interrupted or altered, resulting in visible developmental defects.

==== Enamel hypoplasia ====
Enamel hypoplasia refers to transverse furrows or pits that form in the enamel surface of teeth when the normal process of tooth growth stops, leaving a deficit. Enamel hypoplasias generally form due to disease and/or poor nutrition. Linear furrows are commonly referred to as linear enamel hypoplasias (LEHs); LEHs can range in size from microscopic to visible to the naked eye. By examining the spacing of perikymata grooves (horizontal growth lines), the duration of the stressor can be estimated, although Mays argued that the width of the hypoplasia bears only an indirect relationship to the duration of the stressor.

Studies of dental enamel hypoplasia are used to study child health. Unlike bone, teeth are not remodeled, so intact enamel can provide a more reliable indicator of past health events. Dental hypoplasias provide an indicator of health status during the time in childhood when the enamel of the tooth crown is forming. The presence, frequency, and severity of enamel hypoplasia (EH) offer valuable information about general health conditions and the occurrence of disease or malnutrition. Elevated rates of EH are often interpreted as evidence of widespread physiological stress, such as famine, infectious disease outbreaks, or prolonged nutritional deficiencies. By comparing the prevalence of dental stress indicators across various groups such as different social classes, geographic regions, or time periods bioarcheologists can also infer disparities in living conditions, access to resources, and overall health.

Not all enamel layers are visible on the tooth surface because enamel layers that are formed early in crown development are buried by later layers. Hypoplasias on this part of the tooth do not show on the tooth surface. Because of this buried enamel, teeth record stressors from a few months after the start of the event. The proportion of enamel crown formation time represented by this buried enamel varies from up to 50 percent in molars to 15-20 percent in anterior teeth. Surface hypoplasias record stressors occur from about one to seven years, or up to 13 years if the third molar is included.

=== Skeletal non-specific stress indicators ===
==== Porotic hyperostosis/cribra orbitalia ====
It was long assumed that iron deficiency anemia has marked effects on the flat bones of the cranium of infants and young children. That as the body attempts to compensate for low iron levels by increasing red blood cell production in the young, sieve-like lesions develop in the cranial vaults (termed porotic hyperostosis) and/or the orbits (termed cribra orbitalia). This bone is spongy and soft.

It is however, unlikely that iron deficiency anemia is a cause of either porotic hyperostosis or cribra orbitalia. These are more likely the result of vascular activity in these areas and are unlikely to be pathological. The development of cribra orbitalia and porotic hyperostosis could also be attributed to other causes besides a dietary iron deficiency, such as nutrients lost to intestinal parasites. However, dietary deficiencies are the most probable cause.

Anemia incidence may be a result of inequalities within society, and/or indicative of different work patterns and activities among different groups within society. A study of iron-deficiency among early Mongolian nomads showed that although overall rates of cribra orbitalia declined from 28.7 percent (27.8 percent of the total female population, 28.4 percent of the total male population, 75 percent of the total juvenile population) during the Bronze and Iron Ages, to 15.5 percent during the Hunnu (2209–1907 BP) period, the rate of females with cribra orbitalia remained roughly the same, while incidence among males and children declined (29.4 percent of the total female population, 5.3 percent of the total male population, and 25 percent of the juvenile population had cribra orbitalia). This study hypothesized that adults may have lower rates of cribra orbitalia than juveniles because lesions either heal with age or lead to death. Higher rates of cribia orbitalia among females may indicate lesser health status, or greater survival of young females with cribia orbitalia into adulthood.

==== Harris lines ====
Harris lines form before adulthood, when bone growth is temporarily halted or slowed down due to some sort of stress (typically disease or malnutrition). During this time, bone mineralization continues, but growth does not, or does so at reduced levels. If and when the stressor is overcome, bone growth resumes, resulting in a line of increased mineral density visible in a radiograph. Absent removal of the stressor, no line forms.

Particularly, deficiencies in protein and vitamins, which lead to delayed longitudinal bone growth, can result in the formation of Harris lines. During the process of endochondral bone growth, the cessation of osteoblastic activity results in the deposition of a thin layer of bone beneath the cartilage cap, potentially forming Harris lines. Subsequent recovery, necessary for the restoration of osteoblastic activity, is also implicated in Harris line formation. When matured cartilage cells reactivate, bone growth resumes, thickening the bony stratum. Therefore, complete recovery from periods of chronic illness or malnutrition manifests as transverse lines on radiographs. Lines tend to be thicker with prolonged and severe malnutrition. Harris line formation typically peaks in long bones around 2–3 years after birth and becomes rare after the age of 5 until adulthood. Harris lines occur more frequently in boys than in girls.

=== Hair ===
The stress hormone cortisol is deposited in hair as it grows. This has been used successfully to detect fluctuating levels of stress in the later lifespan of mummies.

== Mechanical stress and activity indicators ==
Examining the effects that activities has upon the skeleton allows the archaeologist to examine who was doing what kinds of labor, and how activities were structured within society. Labor within the household may be divided according to gender and age, or be based on other social structures. Human remains can allow archaeologists to uncover these patterns.

Living bones are subject to Wolff's law, which states that bones are physically affected and remodeled by physical activity or inactivity. Increases in mechanical stress tend to produce thicker and stronger bones. Disruptions in homeostasis caused by nutritional deficiency or disease or profound inactivity/disuse/disability can lead to bone loss. While the acquisition of bipedal locomotion and body mass appear to determine the size and shape of children's bones, activity during the adolescent growth period seems to exert a greater influence on the size and shape of adult bones than exercise later in life.

Muscle or ligament attachment sites on bones (entheses) are also considered to be impacted by habitual biomechanical loading, leading to the occurrence of various entheseal changes. These changes are routinely used in the field to study activity-patterns. An extensive body of recent experimental research on laboratory animals and documented skeletons has confirmed that habitual muscle recruitment can indeed significantly affect entheseal variation in three-dimensional (3D) morphology - especially when this is quantified based on repeatable and validated morphometric approaches (such as for example V.E.R.A. 1.0 - first introduced in 2016 - and V.E.R.A. 2.0). In contrast, previous research relying on the use of traditional methods (visual scoring systems) has shown that processes associated with aging may have a greater impact than occupational stresses. It has also been shown that geometric changes to bone structure (described above) and scored entheseal changes differ in their underlying cause with the latter little affected by occupation. Joint changes, including osteoarthritis, have been used to infer occupations, but in general these are also manifestations of the aging process.

Markers of occupational stress, which include morphological changes to the skeleton and dentition as well as joint changes at specific locations have been widely used to infer specific (rather than general) activities. Such markers are often based on single cases described in late nineteenth century clinical literature. One such marker has been found to be a reliable indicator of lifestyle: the external auditory exostosis also called surfer's ear, which is a small bony protuberance in the ear canal that occurs in those working in proximity to cold water.

One example of how these changes have been used to study activities is the New York African Burial Ground in New York. This provides evidence of the brutal working conditions under which the enslaved labored; osteoarthritis of the vertebrae was common even among the young. The pattern of osteoarthritis combined with the early age of onset provides evidence of labor that resulted in mechanical strain to the neck. One male skeleton shows stress lesions at 37 percent of 33 muscle or ligament attachments, showing he experienced significant musculoskeletal stress. Overall, the interred show signs of significant musculoskeletal stress and heavy workloads, although workload and activities varied by individual. Some show high levels of stress, while others do not. This indicates the variety of types of labor (e.g., domestic vs. carrying heavy loads).

=== Injury and workload ===
Fractures to bones during or after excavation appear relatively fresh, with broken surfaces appearing white and unweathered. Distinguishing between fractures around the time of death and post-depositional fractures in bone is difficult, as both types of fractures show signs of weathering. Unless evidence of bone healing or other factors are present, researchers may choose to regard all weathered fractures as post-depositional.

Evidence of perimortal fractures (or fractures inflicted on a fresh corpse) can be distinguished in unhealed metal blade injuries to the bones. Living or freshly dead bones are somewhat resilient, so metal blade injuries to bone generate a linear cut with relatively clean edges rather than irregular shattering. Archaeologists have attempted to use the microscopic parallel scratch marks on cut bones in order to estimate the trajectory of the blade that caused the injury.

== Diet and dental health ==
Dental caries are caused by localized destruction of tooth enamel, as a result of acids produced by bacteria feeding upon and fermenting carbohydrates in the mouth. Agriculture is strongly associated with a higher rate of caries than foraging, because of the associated higher levels of carbohydrates produced by agriculture. For example, bioarchaeologists have used caries in skeletons to correlate a diet of rice with disease. Women may be more vulnerable to caries compared to men due to having lower saliva flow, the positive correlation of estrogen with increased caries rates, and because of pregnancy-associated physiological changes, such as suppression of the immune system and a possible concomitant decrease in antimicrobial activity in the oral cavity.

== Stable isotope analysis ==
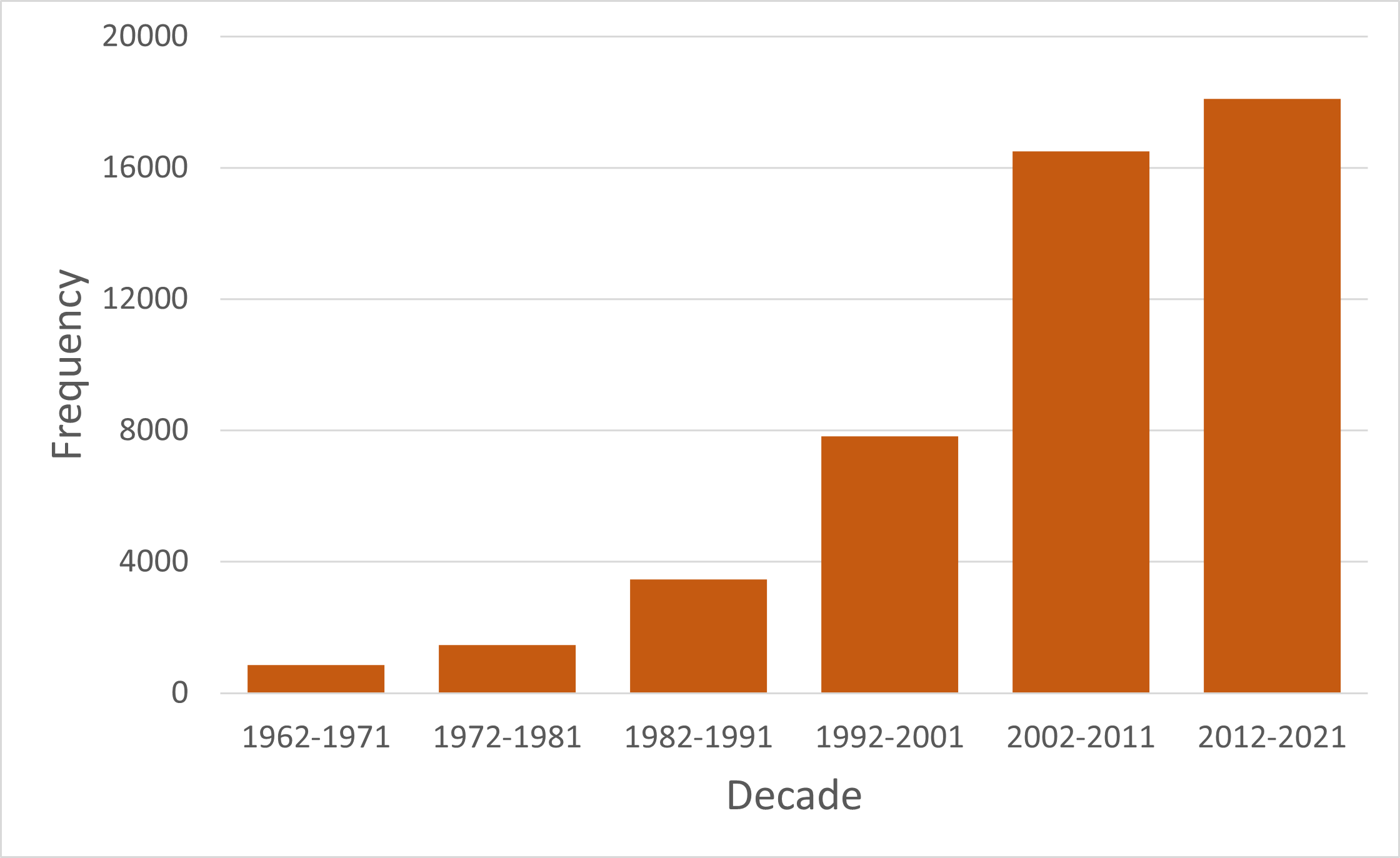

Stable isotope biogeochemistry uses variations in isotopic signatures and relates them to biogeochemical processes. The science is based on the preferential fractionation of lighter or heavier isotopes, which results in enriched and depleted isotopic signatures compared to a standard value. Essential elements for life such as carbon, nitrogen, oxygen, and sulfur are the primary stable isotope systems used to interrogate archeological discoveries. Isotopic signatures from multiple systems are typically used in tandem to create a comprehensive understanding of the analyzed material. These systems are most commonly used to trace the geographic origin of archaeological remains and investigate the diets, mobility, and cultural practices of ancient humans.

=== Applications ===
==== Carbon ====
Stable isotope analysis of carbon in human bone collagen allows bioarchaeologists to carry out dietary reconstruction and to make nutritional inferences. These chemical signatures reflect long-term dietary patterns, rather than a single meal or feast. Isotope ratios in food, especially plant food, are directly and predictably reflected in bone chemistry, allowing researchers to partially reconstruct recent diet using stable isotopes as tracers. Stable isotope analysis monitors the ratio of carbon 13 to carbon 12 (^{13}C/^{12}C), which is expressed as parts per thousand using delta notation (δ^{13}C). The ^{13}C and ^{12}C ratio is either depleted (more negative) or enriched (more positive) relative to a standard. ^{12}C and ^{13}C occur in a ratio of approximately 98.9 to 1.1.

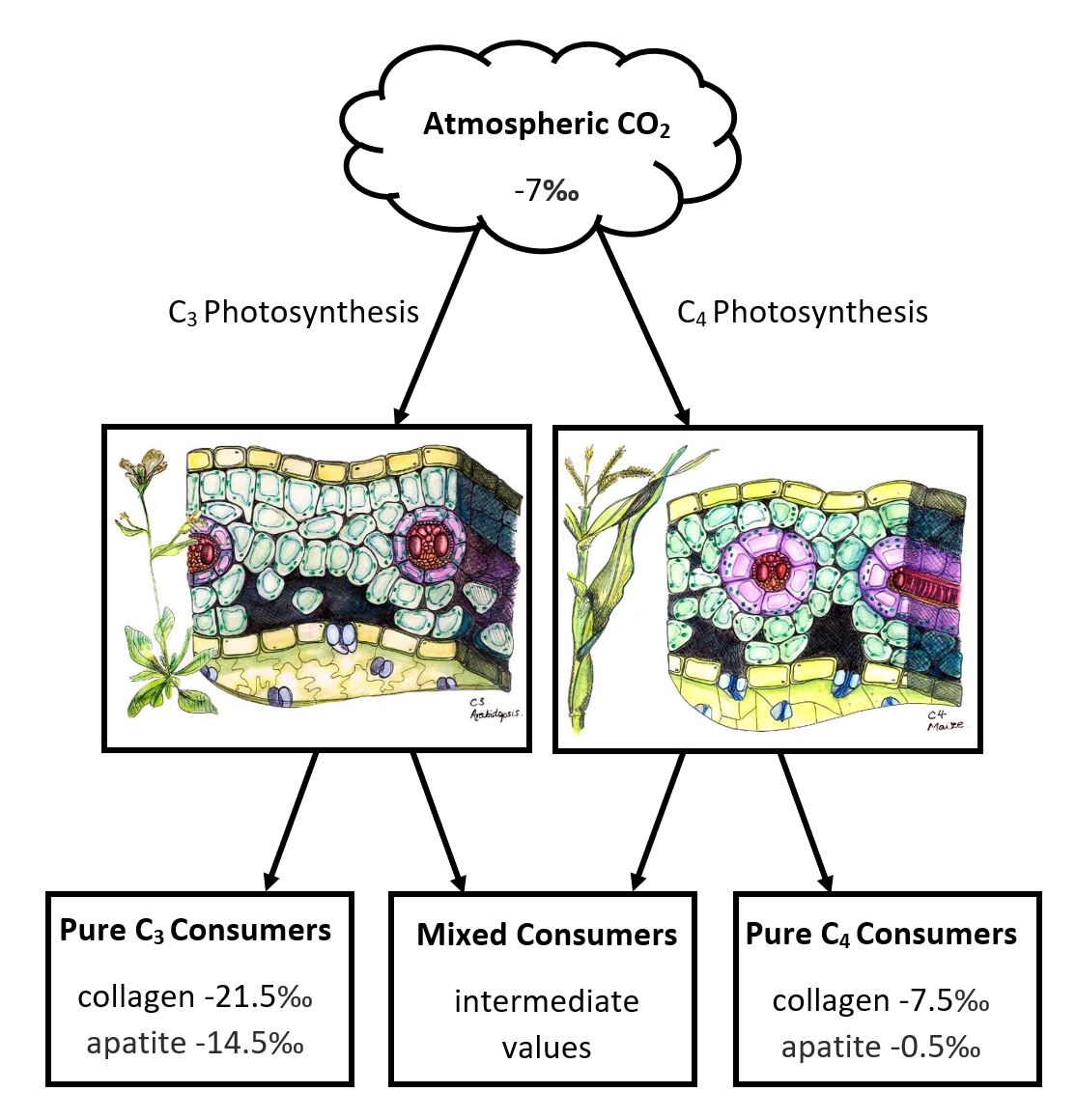
The composition of carbon dioxide in the atmosphere influences the isotopic values of C3 and C4 plants, which then impacts the δ^{13}C of consumer collagen and apatite based on their diets. The values in this diagram are average δ^{13}C compositions for the respective categories based on Fig 11.1 in Staller et al. (2010).

The ratio of carbon isotopes in humans varies according to the types of plants digested with different photosynthesis pathways. The three photosynthesis pathways are C3 carbon fixation, C4 carbon fixation and Crassulacean acid metabolism. C4 plants are mainly grasses from tropical and subtropical regions, and are adapted to higher levels of radiation than C3 plants. Corn, millet and sugar cane are some well-known C4 crops, while trees and shrubs use the C3 pathway. C4 carbon fixation is more efficient when temperatures are high and atmospheric CO_{2} concentrations are low. C3 plants are more common and numerous than C4 plants as C3 carbon fixation is more efficient in a wider range of temperatures and atmospheric CO_{2} concentrations.

The different photosynthesis pathways used by C3 and C4 plants cause them to discriminate differently towards ^{13}C leading to distinctly different ranges of δ^{13}C. C4 plants range between -9 and -16‰, and C3 plants range between -22 and -34‰. The isotopic signature of consumer collagen is close the δ^{13}C of dietary plants, while apatite, a mineral component of bones and teeth, has an ~14‰ offset from dietary plants due fractionation associated with mineral formation. Stable carbon isotopes have been used as tracers of C4 plants in paleodiets. For example, the rapid and dramatic increase in ^{13}C in human collagen after the adoption of maize agriculture in North America documents the transition from a C3 to a C4 (native plants to corn) diet by 1300 CE.

Skeletons excavated from the Coburn Street Burial Ground (1750 to 1827 CE) in Cape Town, South Africa, were analyzed using stable isotope data in order to determine geographical histories and life histories. The people buried in this cemetery were assumed to be slaves and members of the underclass based on the informal nature of the cemetery; biomechanical stress analysis and stable isotope analysis, combined with other archaeological data, seem to support this supposition.

Based on stable isotope levels, one study reported that eight Cobern Street Burial Ground individuals consumed a diet based on C4 (tropical) plants in childhood, then consumed more C3 plants, which were more common there later in their lives. Six of these individuals had dental modifications similar to those carried out by peoples inhabiting tropical areas known to be targeted by slavers who brought enslaved individuals from other parts of Africa to the colony. Based on this evidence, it was argued that these individuals represent enslaved persons from areas of Africa where C4 plants were consumed and who were brought to the Cape as laborers. These individuals were not assigned to a specific ethnicity, but similar dental modifications are carried out by the Makua, Yao, and Marav peoples. Four individuals were buried with no grave goods, in accordance with Muslim tradition, facing Signal Hill, which is a point of significance for local Muslims. Their isotopic signatures indicate that they grew up in a temperate environment consuming mostly C3 plants, but some C4 The study argued that these individuals were from the Indian Ocean area. It also suggested that these individuals were Muslims. It argued that stable isotopic analysis of burials, combined with historical and archaeological data were an effective way of investigating the migrations forced by the African Slave Trade, as well as the emergence of the underclass and working class in the Old World.

==== Nitrogen ====
The nitrogen stable isotope system is based on the relative enrichment/depletion of ^{15}N in comparison to ^{14}N in δ15N. Carbon and nitrogen stable isotope analyses are complementary in paleodiet studies. Nitrogen isotopes in bone collagen are ultimately derived from dietary protein, while carbon can be contributed by protein, carbohydrate, or fat. δ^{13}C values help distinguish between dietary protein and plant sources while systematic increases in δ^{15}N values as you move up in trophic level helps determine the position of protein sources in the food web. ^{15}N increases 3-4% with each trophic step upward. It has been suggested that the relative difference between human δ^{15}N values and animal protein values scales with the proportion of that animal protein in the diet, though this interpretation has been questioned due to contradictory views on the impact of nitrogen intake through protein consumption and nitrogen loss through waste release on ^{15}N enrichment in the body.

Variations in nitrogen values within the same trophic level are also considered. Nitrogen variations in plants, for example, can be caused by plant-specific reliance on nitrogen gas which causes the plant to mirror atmospheric values. Enriched or higher δ^{15}N values can be achieved in plants that grew in soil fertilized by animal waste. Nitrogen isotopes have been used to estimate the relative contributions of legumes verses nonlegumes, as well as terrestrial versus marine resources. While other plants have δ^{15}N values that range from 2 to 6‰, legumes have lower ^{14}N/^{15}N ratios (close to 0‰, i.e. atmospheric N_{2}) because they can fix molecular nitrogen, rather than having to rely on soil nitrates and nitrites. Therefore, one potential explanation for lower δ^{15}N values in human remains is an increased consumption of legumes or animals that eat them. ^{15}N values increase with meat consumption, and decrease with legume consumption. The ^{14}N/^{15}N ratio could be used to gauge the contribution of meat and legumes to the diet.

==== Oxygen ====
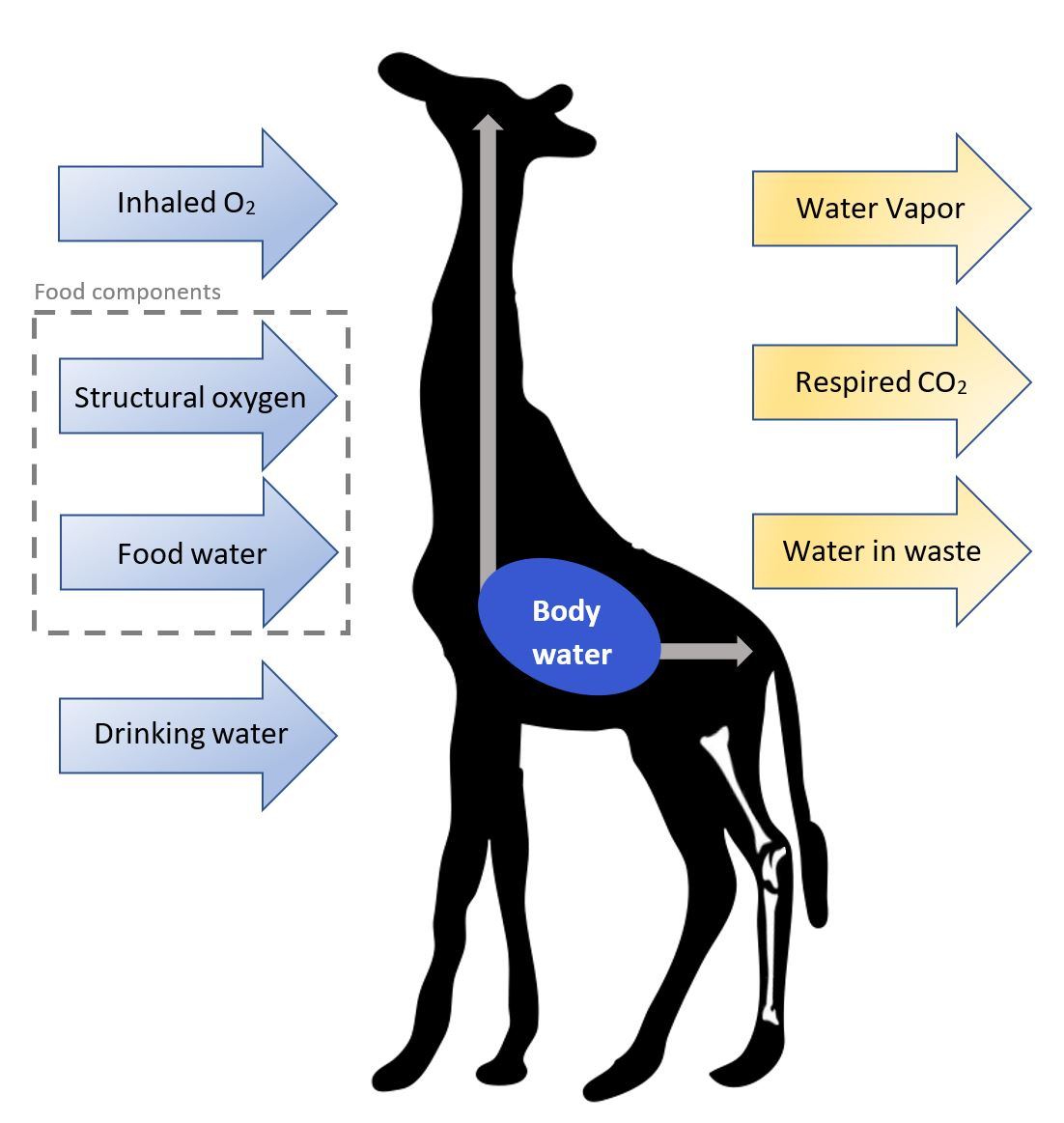

The oxygen stable isotope system is based on the ^{18}O/^{16}O (δ^{18}O) ratio in a given material, which is enriched/depleted relative to a standard. The field typically normalizes to both Vienna Standard Mean Ocean Water (VSMOW) and Standard Light Antarctic Precipitation (SLAP). This system is famous for its use in paleoclimatic studies but it also a prominent source of information in bioarchaeology.

Variations in δ^{18}O values in skeletal remains are directly related to the isotopic composition of the consumer's body water. isotopic composition of mammalian body water is primarily controlled by consumed water. δ^{18}O values of freshwater drinking sources vary due to mass fractionations related to mechanisms of the global water cycle. Evaporated water vapor is more enriched in ^{16}O (isotopically lighter; more negative delta value) compared to the remaining water, which is depleted in ^{16}O (isotopically heavier; more positive delta value). An accepted first-order approximation for the isotopic composition of animal drinking water is local precipitation, though this is complicated to varying degrees by confounding water sources like natural springs or lakes. The baseline δ^{18}O used in archaeological studies is modified depending on the relevant environmental and historical context.

δ^{18}O values of bioapatite in human skeletal remains are assumed to have formed in equilibrium with body water, thus providing a species-specific relationship to oxygen isotopic composition of body water. The same cannot be said for human bone collagen, as δ^{18}O values in collagen seem to be impacted by drinking water, food water, and a combination of metabolic and physiological processes. δ^{18}O values from bone minerals are essentially an averaged isotopic signature throughout the entire life of the individual.

While carbon and nitrogen are used primarily to investigate the diets of ancient humans, oxygen isotopes offer insight into body water at different life stages. δ^{18}O values are used to understand drinking behaviors, animal husbandry, and track mobility. 97 burials from the ancient Maya citadel of Tikal were studied using oxygen isotopes. Results from tooth enamel identified statistically different individuals, interpreted to be individuals from Maya lowlands, Guatemala, and potentially Mexico. Historical context combined with isotopic data from burials were used to argue that migrant individuals were a part of lower and higher social classes within Tikal. Female migrants who arrived in Tikal during Early Classic period could have been the brides of Maya elite.

==== Sulfur ====
The sulfur stable isotope system is based on small, mass-dependent fractionations of sulfur isotopes. These fractionations are reported relative to Canyon Diablo Troilite (V-CDT), the agreed upon standard. The ratio of the most abundant sulfur isotope, ^{32}S, compared to rarer isotopes such as, ^{33}S, ^{34}S, and ^{36}S, is used to characterize biological signatures and geological reservoirs. The fractionation of ^{34}S (δ^{34}S) is particularly useful since it is the most abundant of the rare isotopes. This system is less commonly used on its own and typically complements studies of carbon and nitrogen. In bioarchaeology, the sulfur system has been used to investigate paleodiets and spatial behaviors through the analysis of hair and bone collagen. Dietary proteins incorporated into living organisms tend to determine the stable isotope values of their organic tissues. Methionine and cysteine are the canonical sulfur-containing amino acids. Of the two, δ^{34}S values of methionine are considered to better reflect isotopic compositions of dietary sulfur, since cysteine values are impacted by diet and internal cycling. While other stable isotope systems have significant trophic shifts, sulfur shows only a small shift (~0.5‰).

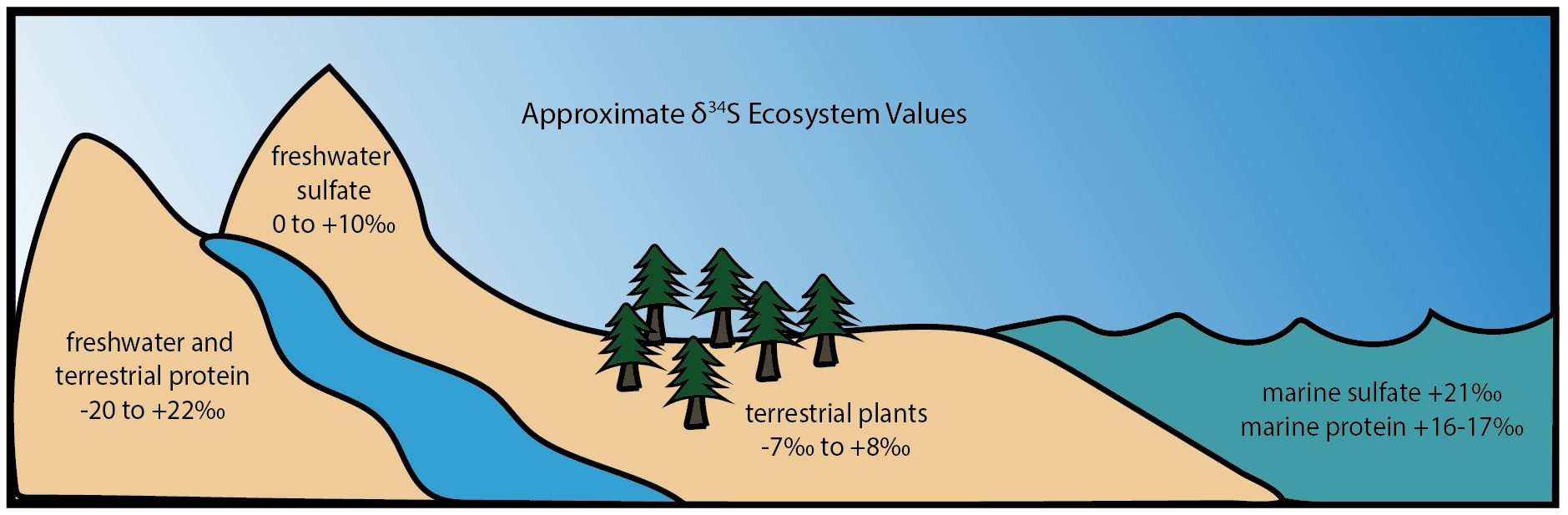
Figure 3 Illustration of different ecosystems with associated ranges of sulfur isotopic signatures.

Consumers yield isotopic signatures that reflect the sulfur reservoir(s) of the dietary protein source. Animal proteins sourced from marine ecosystems tend to have δ^{34}S values between +16 and +17‰, terrestrial plants range from -7‰ to +8‰, while proteins from freshwater and terrestrial ecosystems are highly variable. The sulfate content of the modern ocean is well-mixed with a δ^{34}S of approximately +21‰, while riverine water is heavily influenced by sulfur-bearing minerals in surrounding bedrock and terrestrial plants are influenced by the sulfur content of local soils. Estuarian ecosystems have increased complexity due to seawater and river inputs. The extreme range of δ^{34}S values for freshwater ecosystems often interferes with terrestrial signals, making it difficult to use the sulfur system as the sole tool in paleodiet studies.

Various studies have analyzed the isotopic ratios of sulfur in mummified hair. Hair is a good candidate for sulfur studies as it typically contains at least 5% elemental sulfur. One study incorporated sulfur isotope ratios into their paleodietary investigation of four mummified child victims of Incan sacrificial practices. δ^{34}S values helped them conclude that the children had not been eating marine protein before their death. Historical insight coupled with consistent sulfur signatures for three of the children suggests that they were living in the same location 6 months prior to the sacrifice. Studies have measured δ^{34}S values of bone collagen, though the interpretation of these values was not reliable until quality criteria were published in 2009. Though bone collagen is abundant in skeletal remains, less than 1% of the tissue is made of sulfur, making it imperative that these studies carefully assess the meaning of bone collagen δ^{34}S values.

== DNA ==
DNA analysis of past populations is used to genetically determine sex, determine genetic relatedness, understand marriage patterns, and investigate prehistoric migration.

In 2012 archaeologists found skeletal remains of an adult male. He was buried under a car park in England. DNA evidence allowed the archaeologists to confirm that the remains belonged to Richard III, the former king of England who died in the Battle of Bosworth.

In 2021, Canadian researchers analyzed skeletal remains found on King William Island, identifying them as belonging to Warrant Officer John Gregory, an engineer serving aboard HMS Erebus in the ill-fated 1845 Franklin Expedition. He was the first expedition member to be identified by DNA analysis.

== Biological distance analysis ==
Biological distance analysis (also called biodistance analysis) is a method used to assess genetic relationships among past human individuals and groups in archaeological contexts by examining skeletal traits, particularly metric and nonmetric features of the skull and dentition. By quantifying biological similarities and differences, this approach provides insight into the population structure of ancient societies, including migration patterns, kinship, and post-marital residence. It is often employed when ancient DNA (aDNA) preservation is poor or when destructive sampling is not possible due to curatorial or ethical constraints. Although less precise than aDNA analysis, biodistance analysis remains a key tool in bioarchaeological research, complementing other molecular, isotopic, and material culture evidence.

== Biocultural bioarchaeology ==
The study of human remains can illuminate the relationship between physical bodies and socio-cultural conditions and practices, via a biocultural bioarchaeology model. Bioarchaeology is typically regarded as a positivist, science-based discipline, while the social sciences are regarded as constructivist. Bioarchaeology has been criticized for having little to no concern for culture or history. One scholar argued that scientific/forensic scholarship ignores cultural/historic factors. He proposed that a biocultural version of bioarchaeology offered a more meaningful, nuanced, and relevant picture, especially for descent populations.

Biocultural bioarchaeology combines standard forensic techniques with investigations of demography and epidemiology in order to assess socioeconomic conditions experienced by human communities. For example, incorporation of analysis of grave goods can further the understanding of daily activities.

Some bioarchaeologists view the discipline as a crucial interface between the science and the humanities; as the human body is made and re-made by both biological and cultural factors.

Another type of bioarchaeology focuses on quality of life, lifestyle, behavior, biological relatedness, and population history. It does not closely link skeletal remains to their archaeological context, and may best be viewed as a "skeletal biology of the past".

Inequalities exist in all human societies. Bioarchaeology has helped to dispel the idea that life for foragers of the past was "nasty, brutish and short"; bioarchaeological studies reported that foragers of the past were often healthy, while agricultural societies tended to have increased incidence of malnutrition and disease. One study compared foragers from Oakhurst to agriculturalists from K2 and Mapungubwe and reported that agriculturalists from K2 and Mapungubwe were not subject to the lower nutritional levels expected.

Danforth argues that more "complex" state-level societies display greater health differences between elites and the rest of society, with elites having the advantage, and that this disparity increases as societies become more unequal. Some status differences in society do not necessarily mean radically different nutritional levels; Powell did not find evidence of great nutritional differences between elites and commoners, but did find lower rates of anemia among elites in Moundville.

An area of increasing interest interested in understanding inequality is the study of violence. Researchers analyzing traumatic injuries on human remains have shown that social status and gender can have a significant impact on exposure to violence. Numerous researchers study violence in human remains, exploring violent behavior, including intimate partner violence, child abuse, institutional abuse, torture, warfare, human sacrifice, and structural violence.

== Ethics ==
Ethical issues with bioarchaeology revolve around the treatment and respect for the dead. Large-scale skeletal collections were first amassed in the US in the 19th century, largely the remains of Native Americans. No permission was granted by surviving family for study and display. Federal laws such as 1990's NAGPRA (Native American Graves Protection and Repatriation Act) allowed Native Americans to regain control over their ancestors' remains and associated artifacts.

Many archaeologists did not realize that many people perceive archaeologists as non-productive and/or grave robbers. Concerns about mistreatment of remains are not unfounded: in a 1971 Minnesota excavation, White and Native American remains were treated differently; Whites were reburied, while Native Americans were moved to a natural history museum. African American bioarchaeology grew after NAGPRA and its effect of ending the study of Native American remains.

Bioarchaeology in Europe was not as disrupted by repatriation issues. However, because much of European archaeology has been focused on classical roots, artifacts and art have been emphasized and Roman and post-Roman skeletal remains were nearly completely neglected until the 1980s. In prehistoric European archaeology, biological remains began to be analyzed earlier than in classical archaeology.

While ethical approaches to the excavation and analysis of physical human remains have received considerable attention, professional and academic dialogue regarding how to appropriately record, share, and display human remains in the digital realm is less developed. While digital technologies for recording and analysing human remains are increasingly accessible, justification for such recording and analysis is essential e.g. 3D scanning performed simply because it is possible is inappropriate and disrespectful to the deceased.

== See also ==
- Ancient DNA
- Biocultural anthropology
- Biological distance analysis
- Odontometrics
- Osteoarchaeology
- Paleopathology
- Zooarchaeology
- 2025 in bioarchaeology
- 2026 in bioarchaeology
- Dental analysis in archaeology
