= 2000 in literature =

This article contains information about the literary events and publications of 2000.

== Events ==
- February – The bookstore El Ateneo Grand Splendid takes over the Teatro Gran Splendid in Buenos Aires, converting it for use as retail space.
- February 13 – The final original Peanuts comic strip by Charles M. Schulz is published. Schulz died on February 12.
- March 14 – Stephen King's novella Riding the Bullet is published in e-book format only, as the world's first mass-market electronic book.
- September 26 – English politician and writer Jeffrey Archer is charged with perjury, and on the same day opens in the title role of his own courtroom drama, The Accused.
- December 15 – In a landmark censorship case, Little Sisters Book and Art Emporium v. Canada (Minister of Justice), the Supreme Court of Canada rules that Canada Customs has no authority to make judgments on the permissibility of material being shipped to retailers, only to confiscate material specifically ruled by the courts to constitute an offence under the Canadian Criminal Code.

== New books ==
=== Fiction ===
- Reed Arvin – The Will
- Margaret Atwood – The Blind Assassin
- Louis Auchincloss – Her Infinite Variety
- Trezza Azzopardi – The Hiding Place
- Iain M. Banks – Look to Windward
- Russell Banks – The Angel on the Roof
- Matt Beaumont – e
- Maeve Binchy – Scarlet Feather
- Raymond Benson – Doubleshot
- Ben Bova – Jupiter
- T. C. Boyle – A Friend of the Earth
- Dan Brown – Angels & Demons
- Jim Butcher – Storm Front
- Peter Carey – True History of the Kelly Gang
- Michael Chabon – The Amazing Adventures of Kavalier & Clay: A Novel
- Tom Clancy – The Bear and the Dragon
- Mary Higgins Clark and Carol Higgins Clark – Deck The Halls
- Miriam Cooke – Hayati, My Life
- Bernard Cornwell – Harlequin (also The Archer's Tale)
- Patricia Cornwell – The Last Precinct
- Mark Z. Danielewski – House of Leaves
- August Derleth – The Original Text Solar Pons Omnibus Edition
- K. Sello Duiker – Thirteen Cents
- Ken Follett – Code to Zero
- Jon Fosse – Morning and Evening (Morgon og kveld) (novella)
- David S. Garnett – Bikini Planet
- Amitav Ghosh – The Glass Palace
- Myla Goldberg – Bee Season
- Linda Grant – When I Lived in Modern Times
- John Grisham – The Brethren
- Mohsin Hamid – Moth Smoke
- Joanne Harris – Blackberry Wine
- Elisabeth Harvor – Excessive Joy Injures the Heart
- Joseph Heller – Portrait of an Artist, as an Old Man
- Kazuo Ishiguro – When We Were Orphans
- Elfriede Jelinek – Greed
- Robert Jordan – Winter's Heart
- Barbara Kingsolver – Prodigal Summer
- Sophie Kinsella – The Secret Dreamworld of a Shopaholic
- Andrus Kivirähk – Rehepapp ehk November (Old Barny or November)
- Joe R. Lansdale
  - The Bottoms
  - The Big Blow
- Robert Ludlum – The Prometheus Deception
- Tim LaHaye and Jerry B. Jenkins
  - The Indwelling
  - The Mark
- Colleen McCullough – Morgan's Run
- Alistair MacLeod – Island
- Barry N. Malzberg – In the Stone House
- Juliet Marillier – Son of the Shadows
- George R. R. Martin – A Storm of Swords
- Zakes Mda – The Heart of Redness
- Mikael Niemi – Popular Music from Vittula (Populärmusik från Vittula)
- Joyce Carol Oates – Blonde
- Kenzaburō Ōe (大江 健三郎) – The Changeling (取り替え子 (チェンジリング, Torikae ko [Chenjiringu])
- Daniel Olivas – The Courtship of María Rivera Peña
- Robert B. Parker – Hugger Mugger
- James Patterson – Roses are Red
- Rosamunde Pilcher – Winter Solstice
- Giuseppe Pontiggia – Nati due volte (Born Twice)
- Terry Pratchett – The Truth
- Mario Puzo – Omertà
- Jean Raspail – Le Roi au-delà de la mer
- Kathy Reichs – Deadly Decisions
- Philip Roth – The Human Stain
- Peter Ruber editor – Arkham's Masters of Horror
- Marjane Satrapi – Persepolis (graphic novel, first part)
- Jean-Jacques Schuhl – Ingrid Caven
- Christina Schwarz – Drowning Ruth
- Helen Simpson – Hey Yeah Right Get A Life
- Michael Slade – Hangman
- Gillian Slovo – Red Dust
- Zadie Smith – White Teeth
- Muriel Spark – Aiding and Abetting
- Michael Stackpole
  - Dark Tide: Onslaught
  - Dark Tide: Ruin
- Domenico Starnone – Via Gemito
- Danielle Steel
  - The House On Hope Street
  - Journey
- Kathy Tyers – Balance Point
- Andrew Vachss – Dead and Gone
- Mario Vargas Llosa – The Feast of the Goat (La fiesta del chivo)
- Chris Ware – Jimmy Corrigan, the Smartest Kid on Earth (graphic novel)
- Edmund White – The Married Man

=== Children and young people ===
- Lloyd Alexander – The Cat Who Wished to Be a Man
- David Almond – Counting Stars
- Margaret Beames – Oliver in the Garden
- Kirsten Boie – Wir Kinder aus dem Möwenweg (first in the Kinder aus dem Möwenweg series)
- Lauren Child
  - Beware of the Storybook Wolves
  - I Will Never Not Ever Eat a Tomato
- Deborah Ellis – The Breadwinner (also Parvana, first in the Breadwinner series of four books)
- Mem Fox – Harriet, You'll Drive Me Wild!
- Cornelia Funke – The Thief Lord
- Jamila Gavin – Coram Boy
- Anthony Horowitz – Stormbreaker
- Hwang Sun-mi – The Hen Who Dreamed She Could Fly (마당을 나온 암탉, Sakyejul)
- Shirley Isherwood – Flora the Frog
- Gordon Korman – No More Dead Dogs
- Jim Murphy – BLIZZARD! The Storm That Changed America
- Beverley Naidoo – The Other Side of Truth
- Jerry Pinkney – Aesop's Fables
- Philip Pullman – The Amber Spyglass
- J. K. Rowling – Harry Potter and the Goblet of Fire
- Lemony Snicket
  - The Wide Window
  - The Miserable Mill
  - The Austere Academy
- Jacqueline Wilson – Vicky Angel

=== Drama ===
- David Auburn – Proof
- Timothy Findley – Elizabeth Rex
- Tanika Gupta – The Waiting Room
- Dusty Hughes – Helpless
- Joe Penhall – Blue/Orange

=== Poetry ===
- Anne Carson – Men in the Off Hours
- Paul Celan – Glottal Stop: 101 Poems by Paul Celan (translated by Heather McHugh and Nikolai Popov)
- Fanny Howe – Fanny Howe: Selected Poems
- Pierre Labrie – À tout hasard
- Grazyna Miller – Sull'onda del respiro (On the Wave of Breath)
- Owen Sheers – The Blue Book
- Dejan Stojanović
  - Znak i njegova deca (The Sign and Its Children)
  - Oblik (The Shape)
  - Tvoritelj (The Creator)
  - Krugovanje (Circling), 3rd ed.

=== Non-fiction ===
- Peter Ackroyd – London: A Biography
- Martin Amis – Experience
- The Beatles Anthology
- Mark Buchanan – Ubiquity: The Science of History
- Michael Burleigh – The Third Reich: A New History
- Christian Cannuyer – Coptic Egypt: The Christians of the Nile
- John Colapinto – As Nature Made Him: The Boy Who Was Raised as a Girl
- Mary Craig – Blessings
- Gerina Dunwich – Your Magickal Cat: Feline Magick, Lore, and Worship
- Dave Eggers – A Heartbreaking Work of Staggering Genius
- Charles Foster – Stardust and Shadows: Canadians in Early Hollywood
- John Bellamy Foster – Marx's Ecology
- Aileen Fox – Aileen: a Pioneering Archaeologist (autobiography)
- Malcolm Gladwell – The Tipping Point: How Little Things Can Make a Big Difference
- Lynda Gratton – Living Strategy: Putting People at the Heart of Corporate Purpose
- Taras Grescoe – Sacré Blues
- Christina Hoff Sommers – The War Against Boys: How Misguided Feminism Is Harming Our Young Men
- Will Hutton – The World We're In
- Stephen King – On Writing: A Memoir of the Craft
- Lawrence Lessig – Code and Other Laws of Cyberspace
- Roger Lowenstein – When Genius Failed: The Rise and Fall of Long-Term Capital Management
- Sidney Poitier – The Measure of a Man: A Spiritual Autobiography
- Arun Shourie – Harvesting Our Souls
- Paul H. Ray – The Cultural Creatives: How 50 Million People Are Changing the World
- Lorna Sage – Bad Blood
- Diane Stanley – Michelangelo
- Patrick Tort – Darwin and the Science of Evolution
- Peter Ward and Donald Brownlee – Rare Earth: Why Complex Life is Uncommon in the Universe
- Michael White – Leonardo: the First Scientist
- Bruce Wilkinson – The Prayer of Jabez: Breaking Through to the Blessed Life

== Films ==
- In the Mood for Love - inspired by Liu Yichang's "Intersection"

== Deaths ==
- January 2 – Patrick O'Brian (Richard Patrick Russ), English historical novelist (born 1914)
- January 26
  - Kathleen Hale, English children's author and illustrator (born 1898)
  - A. E. van Vogt, Canadian-American science fiction author (born 1912)
- January 31 – Gil Kane, Latvian-American comic book cartoonist (born 1926)
- February 11 – Bernardino Zapponi, Italian novelist (born 1927)
- February 12 – Charles M. Schulz, American cartoonist (born 1922)
- March 28 – Anthony Powell, English novelist (born 1905)
- April 3 – Terence McKenna, American ethnobotanist, writer and public speaker (born 1946)
- April 13 – Giorgio Bassani, Italian writer (born 1916)
- April 15 – Edward Gorey, American illustrator and writer (born 1925)
- April 21 – Al Purdy, Canadian poet (born 1918)
- April 28 – Penelope Fitzgerald, English novelist, poet and biographer (born 1916)
- May 13 – Paul Bartel, American actor, writer and director (born 1938)
- May 16 – Andrzej Szczypiorski, Polish writer (born 1924)
- May 21 – Dame Barbara Cartland, English novelist and playwright (born 1901)
- July 14 – William Roscoe Estep, American historian and educator (born 1920)
- August 3 – Michael Meyer, English translator and biographer (born 1921)
- August 25 – Carl Barks, American comic book cartoonist (born 1901)
- September 2 – Curt Siodmak, American novelist and screenwriter (born 1902)
- September 3 – Jack Simmons, English historian (born 1915)
  - Oldřich Daněk, Czech dramatist (born 1927)
- September 7 – Sir Malcolm Bradbury, English novelist and critic (born 1932)
- September 14 – Hwang Sun-won, Korean fiction writer (born 1915)
- September 22 – Yehuda Amichai, Israeli Hebrew-language poet (born 1924)
- September 25 – R. S. Thomas, Welsh poet (born 1913)
- October 8 – Charlotte Lamb (Sheila Holland, Sheila Coates, etc.), English romantic novelist (born 1937)
- October 30 – Steve Allen, American writer, television presenter and songwriter (born 1921)
- November 2 – Robert Cormier, American young adult fiction writer (born 1925)
- November 6 – L. Sprague de Camp, American sci-fi, fantasy and science writer (born 1907)
- December 3 – Gwendolyn Brooks, African-American poet (born 1917)

== Awards ==
- Nobel Prize for Literature: Gao Xingjian
- Camões Prize: Autran Dourado

=== Australia ===
- The Australian/Vogel Literary Award: Stephen Gray, The Artist is a Thief
- C. J. Dennis Prize for Poetry: John Millett, Iceman
- Kenneth Slessor Prize for Poetry: Jennifer Maiden, Mines
- Mary Gilmore Prize: Lucy Dougan, Memory Shell
- Miles Franklin Award: Tie: Thea Astley, Drylands; Kim Scott, Benang

=== Canada ===
- Giller Prize for Canadian Fiction: Michael Ondaatje, Anil's Ghost – tied with: David Adams Richards, Mercy Among the Children
- See 2000 Governor General's Awards for a complete list of winners and finalists for those awards.
- Edna Staebler Award for Creative Non-Fiction: Wayson Choy, Paper Shadows

=== France ===
- Prix Femina: Camille Laurens, Dans ces bras-là
- Prix Goncourt: Jean-Jacques Schuhl, Ingrid Caven
- Prix Décembre: Anthony Palou, Camille
- Prix Médicis French: Armelle Lebras-Chopard, Le zoo des philosophes
- Prix Médicis Non-Fiction: Yann Apperry, Diabolus in musica
- Prix Médicis International: Michael Ondaatje, Anil's Ghost

=== Serbia ===
- Rastko Petrović Award: Dejan Stojanović, Conversations ("Razgovori")

=== United Kingdom ===
- Bollinger Everyman Wodehouse Prize for comic literature (first award): Howard Jacobson, The Mighty Walzer
- Booker Prize: Margaret Atwood, The Blind Assassin
- Caine Prize for African Writing: Leila Aboulela, "The Museum"
- Carnegie Medal for children's literature: Beverley Naidoo, The Other Side of Truth
- James Tait Black Memorial Prize for fiction: Zadie Smith, White Teeth
- James Tait Black Memorial Prize for biography: Martin Amis, Experience
- Cholmondeley Award: Alistair Elliot, Michael Hamburger, Adrian Henri, Carole Satyamurti
- Eric Gregory Award: Eleanor Margolies, Antony Rowland, Antony Dunn, Karen Goodwin, Clare Pollard
- Orange Prize for Fiction: Linda Grant, When I Lived in Modern Times
- Samuel Johnson Prize: David Cairns, Berlioz: Volume 2
- Queen's Gold Medal for Poetry: Edwin Morgan
- Whitbread Best Book Award: Matthew Kneale, English Passengers

=== United States ===
- Agnes Lynch Starrett Poetry Prize: Quan Barry, Asylum
- Aiken Taylor Award for Modern American Poetry: Eleanor Ross Taylor
- Bernard F. Connors Prize for Poetry: Corey Marks, "Renunciation", and (separately) Christopher Patton, "Broken Ground"
- Bobbitt National Prize for Poetry: David Ferry, Of No Country I Know: New and Selected Poems and Translations
- Brittingham Prize in Poetry: Greg Rappleye, A Path Between Houses
- Business Week Best Book of the Year: Roger Lowenstein, When Genius Failed
- Compton Crook Award: Stephen L. Burns, Flesh and Silver
- Edgar Award: Joe R. Lansdale, The Bottoms
- Frost Medal: Anthony Hecht
- Hugo Award: Vernor Vinge, A Deepness in the Sky
- Michael L. Printz Award for the "best book written for teens" (first award): Walter Dean Myers, Monster
- National Book Award for Fiction: Susan Sontag, In America
- National Book Critics Circle Award: Ted Conover, Newjack: Guarding Sing Sing
- Nebula Award: Greg Bear, Darwin's Radio
- Newbery Medal for children's literature: Christopher Paul Curtis, Bud, Not Buddy
- PEN/Faulkner Award for Fiction: Ha Jin, Waiting
- Pulitzer Prize for Drama: Donald Margulies, Dinner With Friends
- Pulitzer Prize for Fiction: Jhumpa Lahiri, Interpreter of Maladies
- Pulitzer Prize for Poetry: C.K. Williams, Repair
- Wallace Stevens Award: Frank Bidart
- Whiting Awards:

Fiction: Robert Cohen, Samantha Gillison, Lily King, John McManus, Colson Whitehead
Nonfiction: Andrew X. Pham
Plays: Kelly Stuart
Poetry: Albert Mobilio (poetry/fiction), James Thomas Stevens, Claude Wilkinson

=== Other ===
- Finlandia Prize: Johanna Sinisalo Not Before Sunset (Ennen päivänlaskua ei voi)
- Friedenspreis des Deutschen Buchhandels: Assia Djebar
- International Dublin Literary Award: Nicola Barker, Wide Open
- Premio Nadal: Lorenzo Silva, El alquimista impaciente
- Viareggio Prize: Giorgio van Straten, Il mio nome a memoria and Sandro Veronesi, La forza del passato

== Notes ==
- Hahn, Daniel (2015). The Oxford Companion to Children's Literature (2nd ed.). Oxford. University Press. ISBN 9780198715542.
