= Virals (novel) =

2010 novel by Kathy Reichs

- Cover of the first edition
- Author: Kathy Reichs
- Cover artist: Jacket photograph of girl by Michael Frost, Digital illustration and design by Tony Sahara
- Language: English
- Series: Virals
- Genre: Young adult fiction
- Publisher: Razorbill Books
- Publication date: November 2, 2010
- Publication place: United States
- Media type: Print (hardcover, paperback)
- Pages: 448 (hardcover), 454 (paperback)
- ISBN: 1595143424
- Followed by: Seizure

Virals is the first novel in the Virals series of novels for young adults written by the American forensic anthropologist and crime writer, Kathy Reichs, and her son Brendan Reichs, featuring Tory Brennan, great-niece of Temperance Brennan.

It is the first of Reichs's novels to be written specifically for a young-adult audience.

== Plot ==
Tory and her friends, Hiram (mostly known as Hi), Ben, and Shelton, find a rusted dog tag dating from the Vietnam War era on Loggerhead Island; trying to identify its owner leads them to an unsolved murder and infection by an experimental virus that gives them special powers, which they describe as "flaring". Their powers include super strength, speed and senses. They acquire the infection while saving a wolfdog being used for illegal experiments by Dr. Karsten, who was funded by a company which belongs to Chance Claybourne's Dad.

Meanwhile, they discover a skeleton, which proves to be that of the daughter of the owner of the dog-tag. Someone shoots at them, forcing them to run. They manage to escape, but the next time they visit (with their parents and a police officer), the skeleton has been replaced with monkey bones. They are called 'over imaginative children' and the police leave it at that.

Being curious, Tory and her friends want to find out who committed the murder; using their powers, they crack the case.

== Publishing history ==
Virals was first published in the United States on November 2, 2010, by Razorbill, an imprint of Penguin Books, and published in the UK the same year by Young Arrow, an imprint of Random House. It has had several subsequent English language editions in hardback, paperback, ebook, and audiobook. The book has also been published in French (as Viral, Pocket, 2011), German (Verlagsgruppe Random House GmbH, 2011), and Italian (Rizzoli, 2011).

== Reviews ==
- Kirkus review
