= Code (novel) =

2013 novel by Kathy Reichs and Brendan Reichs

- Cover of the first edition
- Author: Kathy Reichs & Brendan Reichs
- Language: English
- Series: Virals
- Genre: Young adult fiction
- Publisher: Razorbill
- Publication date: March 12, 2013
- Publication place: United States
- Media type: Print (hardcover)
- Pages: 416
- ISBN: 1595144129
- Preceded by: Seizure
- Followed by: Exposure

Code is the third novel in the Virals series of novels for young adults written by the American forensic anthropologist and crime writer, Kathy Reichs and her son Brendan Reichs, featuring fictional character Tory Brennan, great-niece of Temperance Brennan.

== Plot ==
Hi's new metal detector locates a geocache on Loggerhead Island, and the Virals start following the clues left in the cache by the "Gamemaster". Suddenly they realise that the game is deadly, and if they fail then their lives, and those of their friends and family, are at stake. Meanwhile Hurricane Katelyn is bearing down on their home in Charleston, South Carolina.
