= Bare Bones =

Bare Bones, Barebone or Barebones may refer to:

- Bare Bones (Bryan Adams album), a 2010 live acoustic album
- Bare Bones (Madeleine Peyroux album), a 2009 album
- Bare Bones (Wishbone Ash album), a 1999 album
- Bare Bones (novel), a 2003 novel by Kathy Reichs
- Bare Bones Software, a Macintosh computer software developer
- Barebone computer, a type of computer hardware
- Praise-God Barebone (c. 1598–1679), English leather-seller, preacher and Fifth Monarchist
- Barebone's Parliament, a form of government in 17th century England, named after Praise-God Barebone
- Barebones / Boris, a 1996 split EP by drone doom band Boris and Barebones
