= Exposure (Reichs novel) =

2014 novel by Kathy Reichs

- First edition
- Author: Kathy Reichs & Brendan Reichs
- Language: English
- Series: Virals
- Genre: Young adult fiction
- Publisher: G.P. Putnam's Sons
- Publication date: March 3, 2014
- Publication place: United States
- Media type: Print (hardcover)
- Pages: 418
- ISBN: 9780434021864
- Preceded by: Code
- Followed by: Terminal

Exposure is the fourth novel in the Virals series of novels for young adults written by the American forensic anthropologist and crime writer, Kathy Reichs and her son Brendan Reichs, featuring Tory Brennan, great-niece of Temperance Brennan.

== Plot ==
The story starts some time after the ending of Code, the third book in the series. However, it's not long before things start to go wrong. Twins Lucy and Peter Gable, classmates of the Virals, have been kidnapped, and the police seem baffled. The Virals decide to investigate, but matters become worse when Tory's best female friend, Ella, goes missing as well.
