= Flash and Bones =

2011 novel by Kathy Reichs

- First UK edition
- Author: Kathy Reichs
- Language: English
- Series: Temperance Brennan
- Genre: Crime novel
- Publisher: Scribner (US); Heinemann (UK)
- Publication date: 2011
- Publication place: United States
- Media type: Print Hardback
- ISBN: 978-1439-1024-11
- Preceded by: Spider Bones
- Followed by: Bones are Forever

Flash and Bones is the fourteenth novel by Kathy Reichs starring forensic anthropologist Temperance Brennan.

== Plot ==
Brennan is called to examine a body found in a barrel of asphalt beside the racetrack in Charlotte, North Carolina. Things get very complicated when a toxic substance is found in the body, and the FBI seizes all evidence and the body.

== Critical reception ==
David Connett of the Daily Express rated the book 3/5, calling it "an intriguing tale embroiling southern redneck militia and Nascar racing."
