= Cross Bones (novel) =

Novel by Kathy Reichs

- First edition (US)
- Author: Kathy Reichs
- Language: English
- Series: Temperance Brennan
- Genre: Crime novel
- Publisher: Scribner (US); Heinemann (UK)
- Publication date: 2005
- Publication place: United States
- Media type: Print (hardback & paperback)
- Preceded by: Monday Mourning
- Followed by: Break No Bones

Cross Bones is the eighth novel by Kathy Reichs starring forensic anthropologist, Temperance Brennan.

== Plot ==
The story begins in Montreal, Canada, with the body of Avram Faris, who is an antiques dealer and an orthodox Jew. Brennan continues the investigation in Israel, where she and sometime lover Detective Andrew Ryan, and her friend, archeologist Jake Drum, are threatened by radical orthodox sects and other, unknown, parties.

== Facts behind the book ==
Reichs explains the C14 dating of remains as well as ground-penetrating radar in this book.

The protagonist Jake Drum is modeled after Reich's colleague and Biblical archaeologist James Tabor; in the afterword explaining the facts behind the book, she recommends his book The Jesus Dynasty as enjoyable reading. Neither she nor her protagonists in the novel verify or falsify the existence of a tomb of the Jesus family discovered by Shimon Gibson (cf. controversy regarding the Talpiot Tomb and James Ossuary), leaving it as a question of the personal faith of everyone.

The book builds on Jewish and ancient Christian history like the Masada.
