= Break No Bones =

2006 novel by Kathy Reichs

- First edition (US)
- Author: Kathy Reichs
- Language: English
- Series: Temperance Brennan
- Genre: Crime novel
- Publisher: Scribner (US); Heinemann (UK)
- Publication date: 2006
- Publication place: United States
- Media type: Print (hardback & paperback)
- Pages: 334
- ISBN: 0-434-01042-1
- OCLC: 65203167
- Preceded by: Cross Bones
- Followed by: Bones to Ashes

Break No Bones is the ninth novel by Kathy Reichs starring forensic anthropologist Temperance Brennan.

== Plot ==
Brennan and her students are working on a site of prehistoric graves on Dewees Island, South Carolina (a barrier island), when a decomposing body is uncovered in a shallow grave off a lonely beach. Brennan is then called upon to discover what is happening when other bodies begin showing up all around the Charleston area. The story also features a romantic subplot, where Brennan must choose between two men, sometime lover Detective Andrew Ryan and estranged husband Janis "Pete" Peterson, deciding where her heart lies. She also deals with Emma Rousseau, friend and local coroner, who has terminal cancer.
