= Grave Secrets =

2002 novel by Kathy Reichs

- First edition (US)
- Author: Kathy Reichs
- Language: English
- Series: Temperance Brennan
- Genre: Crime
- Publisher: Scribner (US); Heinemann (UK)
- Publication date: 2002
- Publication place: United States
- Media type: Print (hardback & paperback)
- Pages: 448
- ISBN: 978-0-09-930730-3
- Preceded by: Fatal Voyage
- Followed by: Bare Bones

Grave Secrets is the fifth novel by Kathy Reichs starring forensic anthropologist Temperance Brennan.

== Plot ==
Brennan is searching for human remains in mass graves in Guatemala when two colleagues are ambushed and shot. Meanwhile, Sergeant-detective Bartolome "Bat" Galiano of the Guatemala National Civil Police seeks her help in identifying remains found in a septic tank behind a run-down hotel in Guatemala City; could it be one of four young women reported missing, one of whom is the daughter of the Canadian ambassador? Why does the District Attorney confiscate the remains? And what is the link to the American President's recent ruling on stem cell research? With would-be lover Andrew Ryan becoming involved due to the Canadian link, and he and Galiano competing for her affections, Brennan tries to find out what happened to the missing girls and who is trying to stop her doing so.

== Reception ==
Publishers Weekly praised the author by stating "the author keeps the twists coming, and by the novel's climax, she has skillfully interwoven her many subplots and red herrings into a satisfying puddle of sex, sleaze, greed and gore."

However Kirkus Reviews delivered an opposing opinion declaring "the impossibly busy plot, linking every felony in the Western Hemisphere over a generation, clogs Tempe’s fifth (Fatal Voyage, 2001, etc.) as badly as that septic tank."
