= Bones Are Forever =

2012 novel by Kathy Reichs

- US cover of Bones are Forever
- Author: Kathy Reichs
- Language: English
- Series: Temperance Brennan
- Genre: Crime
- Publisher: Scribner (US); Heinemann (UK)
- Publication date: 2012
- Publication place: United States
- Media type: Print (hardback)
- Preceded by: Flash and Bones
- Followed by: Bones of the Lost

Bones Are Forever is the fifteenth novel by Kathy Reichs starring forensic anthropologist Temperance Brennan.

== Plot ==
The discovery of three dead new-born babies in Montreal leads Brennan and on-off lover Detective Andrew Ryan to follow the trail of the missing mother first to Edmonton and then on to Yellowknife, where they find links to drug trafficking and diamond mining.

== Critical reception ==
Writing in the Daily Express, Michelle Davies rated the book 4/5 and said Bones are Forever would make readers "want to keep turning the pages long after lights out to find out what happens next." but that the forensic details provide by Reiches meant some scenes "drag like a science textbook". Entertainment Weekly gave the novel a B−, saying that "If you can get past the lab jargon" the novel was a "decent detective yarn". The Irish Independent called it a "genuinely gripping tale" that is "peppered with authentic forensic science and peopled with well drawn, rounded characters." Publishers Weekly said that Reichs had delivered a "pulse-pounding story".
