= Monday Mourning =

2004 novel by Kathy Reichs

- First edition (US)
- Author: Kathy Reichs
- Language: English
- Series: Temperance Brennan
- Genre: Crime novel
- Publisher: Scribner (US); Heinemann (UK)
- Publication date: 2004
- Publication place: United States
- Media type: Print (Hardback & Paperback)
- Pages: 303 pp
- ISBN: 0-434-01038-3
- OCLC: 55810343
- Preceded by: Bare Bones
- Followed by: Cross Bones

Monday Mourning is the seventh novel by Kathy Reichs starring forensic anthropologist, Temperance Brennan.

Kathy Reichs herself is a forensic anthropologist who works for Office of the Chief Medical Examiner, State of North Carolina, and for the Laboratoire des Sciences Judiciaires et de Médecine Légale for the province of Quebec.

== Plot ==
The plot of the story revolves around Brennan trying to decipher the clues left behind by the skeletons of three girls found in a pizza parlor basement in Montreal, Quebec, Canada, which has a colourful history. Brennan's forensic expertise tells her that the people were buried after 1955, but homicide detective Luc Claudel is convinced the bones are pre-1955, and dismisses the case. Brennan's frustration at Claudel for not investigating the case grows and she decides to take it on herself. From simply the remains of the three girls, she follows the clues which include a frightened old lady, a crazed man with a S&M fetish, and finally a girl who has been subjected to so much sexual torture, she develops a taste for it herself.

== Inspiration ==
At the end of the book, Reichs writes that her inspiration for the plot was three skeletons she was sent to investigate that were found in a pizza parlor basement. The girls' bones showed that they had died before 1955 so there was no police investigation into the deaths. Reichs writes she has always wondered who the girls were and how they came to be buried under the parlor.

The other inspiration the story is based upon is revealed in-story in chapters 29 & 30, where the Kidnapping of Colleen Stan is recounted and later discovered as the inspiration of antagonist Menard (copycat crime).

== Dedication ==
The dedication at the start of the book reads; "To Deborah Minor and my baby sister Harry". Deborah Minor is Reichs' publisher and Harry is her younger sister, upon whom a character in the book, Brennan's sister Harry, is based.
