= 206 Bones =

2009 novel by Kathy Reichs

- First edition (US)
- Author: Kathy Reichs
- Language: English
- Series: Temperance Brennan
- Genre: Crime novel
- Publisher: Scribner (US); Heinemann (UK)
- Publication date: 2009
- Publication place: United States
- Media type: Print Hardback
- Pages: 303
- ISBN: 978-0-434-01468-2
- OCLC: 427611057
- Preceded by: Devil Bones
- Followed by: Spider Bones

206 Bones is the twelfth novel by Kathy Reichs starring forensic anthropologist Temperance Brennan.

== Plot ==
The book opens with Brennan imprisoned in an enclosed space, unable to remember where she is and how she got there. The plot is interspersed with Brennan's account of how she escapes, culminating in the final dénouement.

The rest of the story is told in flashback. When Brennan has to recover the remains of a murdered elderly woman from a shallow grave in the midst of a freezing Quebec winter, she thinks she has the full set of 206 bones, but when she returns to her lab to analyze the remains, she discovers that certain crucial finger bones (that could confirm the identity of the victim) are not present.

Brennan soon discovers that an accusation of incompetence has been made against her: an anonymous phone call to the father of a murder victim alleges that Brennan neglected to observe trauma resulting from a bullet wound in the bones of an aging Chicago heiress that were found in the Quebec countryside some months previously. Brennan and her on-again/off-again lover Detective Andrew Ryan set out to Chicago to attempt to clear her name, where, much to Brennan's annoyance, Ryan bonds with her estranged husband's Latvian family after his flight back to Montreal is delayed by the weather.

The morale of the Montreal forensics team is poor, with the addition of a disruptive new recruit to the group, and the department head on extended sick leave. Two more elderly women are dead or missing, and Ryan suspects that the force may be dealing with a serial killer. In the process of solving the crime, Brennan also has to deal with an aggressive cat-hating neighbour and a cold case in Chicago involving a family link.
