= Virals =

Series of novels by Kathy Reichs and Brendan Reichs

Virals is a series of novels for young adults written by the American forensic anthropologist and crime writer, Kathy Reichs and her son Brendan Reichs, featuring Tory Brennan, great-niece of Temperance Brennan.

== Series ==
The series was the idea of Reichs's son, attorney Brendan Reichs, who also co-writes the books.

The stories, which have elements of science fiction and fantasy, are set in Charleston, South Carolina and the nearby islands and follow the adventures of Tory Brennan (the great-niece of Temperance Brennan, the fictional heroine of Reichs's adult thriller series) and her friends Hiram Stolowitski, Ben Blue, and Shelton Devers. Most of the stories involve the Loggerhead Island Research Institute (LIRI), situated on Loggerhead Island, lying in the Atlantic Ocean to the east of Morris Island.

=== Books ===
1. Virals (2010)
2. Seizure (2011)
3. Code (2013)
4. Exposure (2014)
5. Terminal (2015)
6. Trace Evidence (2016) - a short story collection including Shock, Shift, Swipe and Spike (a new story set after the events of Terminal).

=== Downloadable novellas ===
1. Shift (released March 2013) – focuses on a robbery at LIRI and pits Brennan vs Brennan as Temperance Brennan is investigating while Tory and her Virals also attempt to crack the case. Although the books are narrated in the first person by Tory, in Shift the character narration changes with each chapter - Shelton narrates chapters 1 and 5, Ben chapters 2 and 7, Hi chapters 3 and 6, Tory chapters 4 and 8, Kit chapter 9 and Tempe chapter 10. This allows the reader to see for the first time what each character thinks about the others.
2. Swipe (released December 2013) – Tory and her Virals join Tempe at Comic-Con in San Diego. When one of the exhibits goes missing, Tempe's forensic expertise and the Virals' special powers combine to locate it and capture the thief. Swipe is included as a bonus story in some editions of Terminal.
3. Shock (released February 2015) - a prequel to the series, with a grieving Tory arriving in the Lowcountry and meeting her father for the first time. Taking a run on the beach, she meets three boys and an injured turtle....

== Recurring characters ==
=== The Virals ===
The Virals live with their parents on Morris Island in housing provided by LIRI, and attend the upmarket Bolton Academy in Charleston, the fees for which are paid by LIRI. When they experience "flaring" their eyes glow a deep, primal gold, and their senses of smell, vision and hearing are magnified. They always carry sunglasses along with them.

- Tory (Victoria) Brennan – The intelligent, determined, headstrong and occasionally reckless leader of the Virals. She is 14, a bit of a tomboy and Temperance Brennan's great-niece. She is described as being five-five, having red hair, emerald eyes and pale skin. She spent her early life in Massachusetts with her mother, Colleen Brennan, but went to live with her father Kit in Charleston, South Carolina after Colleen was killed by a drunk driver. She has the best sense of smell when flaring. Her sense of smell is sometimes powerful enough to detect human feelings and emotions. She refers to herself as the 'Alpha' of the pack and has a slight telepathic ability. Even though she is the youngest among the Virals, she is the leader of their pack and the boys appear to be ok with that. She is able to read the minds of fellow Virals and sometimes, when she is particularly powerful, she is even able to 'see' through their eyes. She was reluctantly pushed into joining cotillions as a deb (debutante) by her father's girlfriend, Whitney Rose Dubois, who frequently gets on her nerves.
- Hi (Hiram) Stolowitski – The husky, stand-up comedian of the group, provides much of the comic relief. He is also described as being a master of sarcasm by Tory. Hi is 15 (Turns 16 in "Exposure") years old, loves natural science and has the best eyesight when flaring. He accesses his powers with the most ease out of all the Virals. He has an affinity for technology as his father is a lab technician at LIRI. He often does not approve of Tory's many 'ideas' but is almost always swayed by Shelton and Ben. He usually dresses in Hawaiian print T-shirts which as Tory says do not match but is classic Hi Stolowitski. His parents are Linus and Ruth Stolowitski.
- Ben (Benjamin) Blue – The serious, quiet, and dark member of the team is 16. He claims to be part Sewee Indian and is described as having shoulder length black hair, dark eyes and has a coppery tan. He is the strongest and fastest when flaring. It is also revealed that he once worked with the Gamemaster to impress Tory, showing that he has developed feelings for her. He has a sixteen-foot Boston Whaler runabout he named Sewee which is the Virals primary mode of transportation. Ben is very proud of his boat and is careful not to damage it. He rarely smiles, but when he does, Tory describes him as changing from a sullen boy to a charming young man. He lives with his father, Tom Blue on Morris Island while his mother Myra Blue lives in Mount Pleasant. His father operates the ferry service between Loggerhead Island and Morris Island.
- Shelton Devers – The "One man Geek Squad" of the team. The 15-year-old is the most intelligent when it comes to technology or mechanics and has the best hearing when flaring. As he has an African-American father and an Asian mother, he has dark skin and Japanese features. He has a lock pick set which he is very proud of and he is an expert at picking locks. He is also terrified of the dark and often tugs at his earlobe when he is feeling nervous or tense. He can crack codes and solve puzzles with relative ease, a useful skill to the Virals. His parents are Nelson and Lorelei Devers, an IT expert and veterinary expert respectively.
- Cooper – Tory's pet wolf-dog is the fifth member of the Virals. He is extremely loyal and protective of the Virals, especially Tory. His mother, Whisper, is a wolf from Montana who was brought to Loggerhead Island as a pet and allowed to run wild, where she mated with Polo, a German shepherd, producing first Buster and then Cooper. Cooper is affectionately called 'Coop' by Tory as well as the other Virals. He joins the Virals on some of their adventures.

=== Parents of the Virals ===
The fathers are all employees of LIRI.

- Christopher 'Kit' Howard – His mother Harry is the sister of Temperance Brennan. He met Tory's mother Colleen Brennan at a sailing camp on Cape Cod when they were both sixteen and he did not discover that he had fathered a daughter until many years later. He worked at LIRI as a veterinary expert and was appointed Director following Karsten's death. He is a somewhat clueless parent and cannot really keep track of Tory's activities. It is also mentioned that he gets along well with his other colleagues from LIRI and does not set himself apart from them. His girlfriend is Whitney Rose Dubois, whom Tory cannot stand.
- Linus and Ruth Stolowitski – They are the parents to Hiram 'Hi' Stolowitski. Linus is a quiet and dignified man and Tory states that Hi does not take after his dad. However, Ruth is described as being religious and often drives to a temple in Charleston in 'sporadic bursts of piety'. She also runs a Community Watch team which patrols Morris Island.
- Tom and Myra Blue – They are the parents to Ben Blue. Tom lives on Morris Island with his son, Ben, while Myra lives in a condominium near Mount Pleasant. It is unclear if the senior Blues are still married but living separately or if they are divorced. Tom Blue is mentioned to not really care about discipline, so Ben does not suffer as long a punishment as the other Virals. He also runs the ferry service on Morris Island and has a boat named 'Hugo'. Myra Blue is not mentioned very often.
- Nelson and Lorelei Devers – They are the parents to Shelton Devers. Nelson, who is ten years older than Lorelei, is African-American, a former dockworker from the Bronx who joined the Navy and was stationed in Okinawa. He met Lorelei at a Japanese community college where he was teaching computer science. Nelson works as the IT specialist at LIRI, while Lorelei is Japanese and works as a veterinary technician; Nelson was the first black man she had ever met. Shelton inherited Nelson's complexion and Lorelei's Asian features. They are intolerant of criminal behaviour, regardless of justification thus grounding Shelton for the longest time out of all the Virals. Shelton also mentions that his parents never sleep past 6 in the morning.

=== Fellow pupils ===
- Chance Claybourne – He attends Bolton Academy along with the Virals and is the son of Hollis Claybourne. He is described as darkly handsome and the night to Jason's day. He is the captain of the lacrosse team. He dated Hannah Wythe but is shown to have a slight crush on Tory as he can be seen flirting with her on numerous occasions. He was shot by Hannah in the cellar of Claybourne Manor and suffered severe mental trauma. He is committed to a psychiatric hospital which, ironically, he owns. He is later cured and released from the hospital. He is now the head of the Claybourne business as his father was arrested for numerous crimes including the murder of Katherine Heaton. He has witnessed the Virals when they were flaring and is determined to seek out their secret. At the end of Exposure, he reveals he has also become a Viral, although his eyes glow "molten red" so there are variations in his condition compared to the original Viral group.
- Jason Taylor – He attends Bolton Academy with the Virals. He is often described as having blond hair and blue eyes "like a Nordic god". He is shown having genuine affection towards Tory but is not very fond of Ben, at one point almost punching him. He later becomes the captain of the lacrosse team after Chance is committed to a psychiatric hospital. His family is relatively well off and owns a yacht.
- The "Tripod" – The Tripod is a group of mean girls, Madison Dunkle, Ashley Bodford and Courtney Holt. They are nicknamed 'The Tripod of Skank' by Tory as they are extremely snarky and mean towards her and the other Virals. Madison is interested in Jason and she dislikes Tory because Jason pays more attention to her. Tory later gets back at Madison by flashing her golden eyes at her in the girls bathroom. As a result, Madison becomes extremely terrified of Tory and runs whenever she sees her. Courtney is described as being extremely ditzy and slow while Ashley is slightly sharper.
- Ella Francis - She is introduced for the first time in Exposure as Tory's best female friend. She is the midfield maestro of the Bolton Prep Lady Griffins soccer team. Tory describes her as being "beautiful in a textbook, Gap-model way, with gray-green eyes, pale skin, and a thick braid of sheeny black hair that fell to her waist". She also has a biting sense of humor and is mercilessly sarcastic.
