= Beverley Naidoo =

South African author

Beverley Naidoo FRSL (née Trewhela) is a South African author of children's books who lives in the UK. Her first three novels featured life in South Africa where she lived until her twenties. She has also written a biography of the trade unionist Neil Aggett.

The Other Side of Truth, published by Puffin in 2000, is a story about Nigerian political refugees in England. For that work she won the annual Carnegie Medal from the Library Association, recognising the year's best children's book by a British subject.

Naidoo won the Josette Frank Award twice – in 1986 for Journey to Jo'burg and in 1997 for No Turning Back: A Novel of South Africa.

== Biography ==
Beverley Naidoo was born Beverly Trewhela on 21 May 1943 in Johannesburg, South Africa to white parents Ralph and Evelyn Trewhela. Her father was a composer and music copyright manager, and her mother was a broadcaster and theatre critic. She grew up under apartheid laws that gave privilege to white children.

She graduated from the University of Witwatersrand in 1963. As a student, Naidoo began to work as Adviser for Cultural Diversity and English in Dorset. She has tutored Creative Writing at Goldsmiths College, University of London, and run workshops for young people and adults in Britain and abroad, including for the British Council. She married another South African exile. Apartheid laws forbade marriage between white and black people and barred them living together with their children in South Africa. She married solicitor Nandhagopaul Naidoo in 1969.

As a child Naidoo always loved stories but only started writing when her own children were growing up. Her first book, Journey to Jo'burg, won The Other Award in Britain. It opened a window onto children's struggles under apartheid. In South Africa it was banned until 1991, the year after Nelson Mandela was released from jail. A few years later, when the parents of all South African children had the right to vote for the first time, Nelson Mandela was elected president.

Naidoo was elected a Fellow of the Royal Society of Literature in 2023.

== Books ==
Journey to Jo'burg, Chain of Fire and Out of Bounds are set in South Africa under apartheid, while No Turning Back concerns the experiences of a boy trying to survive on the streets of Johannesburg in the immediate post-apartheid years. The Other Side of Truth and its sequel, Web of Lies, deal with the experiences of the children of an outspoken Nigerian writer as they seek political asylum in England. Her 2007 novel Burn My Heart has an imagined point of reference in the boyhood in Kenya of a second cousin, Neil Aggett, being set in the 1950s during the Mau Mau Uprising.

Naidoo has also written several picture books, featuring children from Botswana and England. In 2004, she wrote the picture book Papa's Gift, set in contemporary South Africa, with her daughter, Maya Naidoo. In The Great Tug of War and Other Stories she retells African folktales, the precursors of the Brer Rabbit tales.

== Works ==
- Journey to Jo'burg (1985)
- Chain of Fire (1989), sequel to Journey to Jo'burg
- Through Whose Eye? Exploring Racism: reader, text and context (1992), nonfiction
- No Turning Back (1995)
- The Other Side of Truth (2000)
- The Great Tug of War and other stories (2001), retellings
- Out of Bounds: Stories of Conflict and Hope (2003)
- Web of Lies (2004), sequel to The Other Side of Truth
- Making It Home: Real-life Stories from Children Forced to Flee (with Kate Holt)
- Burn My Heart (2007)
- Call of the Deep (2008), retellings
- Death of an Idealist (2012)

Picture books

- Letang and Julie Save the Day (1994)
- Letang's New Friend (1994)
- Trouble for Letang and Julie (1994)
- Where Is Zami? (1998)
- King Lion in Love (2004)
- Baba's Gift (2004), by Beverley and Maya Naidoo
- S Is for South Africa
- Aesop's Fables, a retelling with illustrations by Piet Grobler

Featured in

- New South African Plays (2006)
