= Spider Bones =

2010 novel by Kathy Reichs

- US cover of Spider Bones
- Author: Kathy Reichs
- Language: English
- Series: Temperance Brennan
- Genre: Crime novel
- Publisher: Scribner (US); Heinemann (UK)
- Publication date: 2010
- Publication place: United States
- Media type: Print Hardback
- Pages: 320
- ISBN: 978-1-4391-0239-8
- Preceded by: 206 Bones
- Followed by: Flash and Bones

Spider Bones is the thirteenth novel by Kathy Reichs starring forensic anthropologist Temperance Brennan.

== Alternate Title ==
It was released under the title Mortal Remains in Australia and the United Kingdom.

== Plot ==
Brennan is called to examine a newly-dead body in Quebec, which turns out to be that of John "Spider" Lowery, an American ex-soldier apparently killed in Vietnam in 1968. After exhuming the remains buried under Lowery's name, she travels to Hawaii to check the US military records, along with her grieving daughter Katy (whose friend has been killed in Afghanistan), where they are joined by sometime lover Detective Andrew Ryan and his recovering addict daughter Lily. As Brennan begins to uncover the truth, the two girls are put in danger.

== Critical reception ==
Writing in The Independent, David Evans said that Reichs' expertise means that her "descriptions of grisly autopsies ring true" but that "Sadly the same cannot be said of her dialogue, and the banter between Brennan and her love interest falls flat." Publishers Weekly also commented on how Reichs' scientific expertise contributes positively to the book, and that she delivers "a whopper of a final twist".
