= Devil Bones =

2008 novel by Kathy Reichs

- Author: Kathy Reichs
- Language: English
- Series: Temperance Brennan
- Genre: Crime novel
- Publisher: Scribner
- Publication date: 2008
- Publication place: United States
- Media type: Print
- Pages: 320 (Hardcover)
- ISBN: 978-0-7432-9439-3 (Hardcover)
- Preceded by: Bones to Ashes
- Followed by: 206 Bones

Devil Bones is the eleventh novel by Kathy Reichs starring forensic anthropologist Temperance Brennan. It was first published Scribner in the United States on August 1, 2008, and by Heinemann in the United Kingdom.

== Plot ==
Animal and human remains are found in a house under renovation in Charlotte, North Carolina. Apparent signs of satanism and devil worship are also found which lead to a witch hunt by the panicked citizens. While solving these murders, personal issues are also on the rise. Katy, Ryan, Pete, and Temperance are all facing major life changes.
