= Déjà Dead =

1997 novel by Kathy Reichs

- First edition (US)
- Author: Kathy Reichs
- Language: English
- Series: Temperance Brennan
- Genre: Crime novel
- Publisher: Scribner (US); Heinemann (UK)
- Publication date: September 1997
- Publication place: United States
- Pages: 411 pp
- OCLC: 36485776
- Dewey Decimal: 813/.54 21
- LC Class: PS3568.E476345 D4 1997
- Followed by: Death du Jour

Déjà Dead is the first novel by Kathy Reichs starring forensic anthropologist Temperance Brennan.

It won the 1998 Arthur Ellis Award for Best First Novel.

== Plot ==
When the meticulously dismembered body of a woman is discovered in the ground of an abandoned monastery in Montreal, Canada, which is too "decomposed for standard autopsy", an anthropologist is requested.

Dr. Temperance Brennan, Director of Forensic Anthropology for the province of Quebec, who has been researching recent disappearances in the city, is given the case. Despite the deep cynicism of Detective Claudel who heads the investigation, Brennan is convinced that a serial killer is at work. Her forensic expertise finally convinces Claudel, but only after the body count has risen. Brennan initiates an investigation, but her determined probing places those closest to her in danger.

== Critical reception ==
Reichs' work was compared to the Kay Scarpetta novels by Patricia Cornwell.
