= Seizure (Reichs novel) =

Reichs novel

- First edition
- Author: Kathy Reichs & Brendan Reichs
- Language: English
- Series: Virals
- Genre: Young adult fiction
- Publisher: Razorbill
- Publication date: 2011
- Publication place: United States
- Media type: Print (hardcover, paperback)
- ISBN: 9780099571452
- Preceded by: Virals
- Followed by: Code

Seizure is the second novel in the Virals series of novels for young adults written by the American forensic anthropologist and crime writer, Kathy Reichs and her son Brendan Reichs, featuring Tory Brennan, great-niece of Temperance Brennan.

== Plot ==
Tory Brennan and her friends find themselves in danger of being separated due to budget cuts which may mean the closure of the Loggerheads Island Research Institute (LIRI) where their parents work. Discovering that pirate Anne Bonny's treasure is believed to be buried somewhere near their home in Charleston, South Carolina, they set out to follow the clues to the treasure, using their "Viral" powers gained in the previous book in the series, in the hope that if they find it, it will be worth enough to save LIRI. However, it is not just them that wants the treasure. The Virals must beat their opponents to the treasure.

== Reviews ==
- Kirkus review
