= Fatal Voyage =

2001 novel by Kathy Reichs

- US cover of Fatal Voyage
- Author: Kathy Reichs
- Language: English
- Series: Temperance Brennan
- Genre: Crime novel
- Publisher: Scribner (US); Heinemann (UK)
- Publication date: July 17, 2001
- Publication place: United States
- Pages: 420
- ISBN: 978-0671028374
- OCLC: 156808192
- Preceded by: Deadly Decisions
- Followed by: Grave Secrets

Fatal Voyage is the fourth novel by Kathy Reichs starring Temperance Brennan, a forensic anthropologist.

== Plot ==
A plane crash in the mountains of North Carolina and an unidentified severed foot found in the vicinity lead Brennan and would-be lover Detective Andrew Ryan to investigate a mysterious cult.

== Publication history ==
Fatal Voyage was first published in the United States on July 17, 2001, by Scribner. It was published by Heinemann in the United Kingdom and Australia. It was also released as an audiobook, read by Katherine Borowitz.

== Critical reception ==
The book entered the Publishers Weekly performance top 10 list in eighth place. The Publishers Weekly review praised the book's "restraint" and its "riveting plot", Kim Bunce at the Guardian applauded the plot's "complex and evil tapestry". while Michele Hewitson in the New Zealand Herald called it "another big fat forensic thriller".
