= Death du Jour =

1999 novel by Kathy Reichs

- First edition (US)
- Author: Kathy Reichs
- Language: English
- Series: Temperance Brennan
- Genre: Crime novel
- Publisher: Scribner (US); Heinemann (UK)
- Publication date: 1999
- Publication place: United States
- Pages: 436 pp
- Preceded by: Déjà Dead
- Followed by: Deadly Decisions

Death du Jour is the second novel by American author Kathy Reichs starring forensic anthropologist Temperance Brennan.

== Plot ==
On a bitterly cold March night in Montreal, Quebec, Canada, Brennan is exhuming the remains of a nun proposed for sainthood in the grounds of a church. Hours later she's called to the scene of an horrific arson, where a young family has perished. There seem to be no witnesses, motive and no explanation. From the charred remains of the inferno to a trail of sinister cult activity which leads her to Beaufort, South Carolina and a terrifying showdown during an ice storm back in Canada, Brennan faces a test of both her forensic expertise and her survival instinct.
