= Bones to Ashes =

2007 novel by Kathy Reichs

- First edition (US)
- Author: Kathy Reichs
- Language: English
- Series: Temperance Brennan
- Genre: Crime
- Publisher: Scribner (US); Heinemann (UK)
- Publication date: 2007
- Publication place: United States
- Media type: Print (hardback & paperback)
- ISBN: 978-0-7432-9437-9
- Preceded by: Break No Bones
- Followed by: Devil Bones

Bones to Ashes is the tenth novel by Kathy Reichs starring forensic anthropologist Temperance Brennan.

The plot begins with Brennan receiving a box of old bones, and brings up an unsolved mystery from her childhood when one of her friends vanished; the case involves child pornography and the pursuit of a killer.

== Plot ==
The opening two chapters provide details of Brennan's childhood and her holiday friendship on Pawleys Island, South Carolina, with an Acadian girl, Evangeline Landry, who mysteriously disappeared in her early teens.

Years later, while working at the Laboratoire de Sciences Judiciaires et de Médecine Légale in Montreal, Quebec, Canada, Brennan hears from Sergent-enqueteur Hippolyte "Hippo" Gallant about a box of human bones that she begins to suspect could be Evangeline's remains, and investigates them alongside her routine forensic work. Lieutenant-Detective Andrew Ryan, Brennan's regular co-worker and sometime lover, is involved in a case with three missing and two dead girls, and calls on her to help.

Meanwhile Brennan's husband Pete, from whom she has long been separated, decides to divorce her for a woman 20 years younger than he is, and her sister Harry comes to visit and becomes involved in the search for Evangeline.

As Brennan, Harry, Ryan and Hippo follow the leads they find links to a child pornography ring, and visit Tracadie on the Acadian Peninsula and Quebec City before the plot climaxes on the outskirts of Montreal.

== Reviews ==
Entertainment Weekly found it chilling and the scientific details credible, scoring it B+.
