= The Brethren (Grisham novel) =

2000 Novel by John Grisham

- First edition cover
- Author: John Grisham
- Language: English
- Publisher: Doubleday
- Publication date: 2000
- Publication place: United States
- Media type: Print (Hardback & Paperback)
- Pages: 416 (hardback edition), 440 (paperback edition)
- ISBN: 0-385-49746-6
- OCLC: 54083777
- LC Class: PS3557.R5355 B74 2000b

The Brethren is a 2000 legal thriller novel by American author John Grisham.

== Plot ==
The "Brethren" are three former judges who are incarcerated at Trumble, a fictional federal minimum security prison located in northern Florida. The trio embark on a scam to deceive and exploit wealthy closeted gay men. None of them is gay, but they write convincingly as two young vulnerable gay men, developing friendships and then asking for financial help. In some cases, they also try blackmail.

With the help of their lawyer, Trevor Carson, they transfer their ill-gotten money to a secret Bahamian bank account. Carson takes one-third and employs private detectives to investigate the victims of the scam. This takes over from Carson's normal legal business, which had been making very little money for him.

Meanwhile, Teddy Maynard, the ruthless and soon-to-retire director of the CIA, is orchestrating a scheme to tip the United States presidential election in the favor of Aaron Lake, a hawkish congressman supported by arms manufacturers. However, Lake, who is closeted, is hooked by the unwitting Brethren in their scam. Realizing that Lake stands to be exposed, Maynard scrambles to stop them from finding out the truth. After the Brethren fire Carson, he is killed by CIA agents in the Caribbean.

The CIA plant a man inside Trumble, who tells the Brethren that he knows about the scam. A deal is worked out, money changes hands and the judges are pardoned by the outgoing president at Maynard's insistence. The judges leave the country and travel to Europe, where they later restart the scam. Meanwhile, Lake is elected and Maynard, eager to finish the cover-up, selects for him a suitable First Lady.

== Reception ==
In a starred review, Publishers Weekly highlighted how Grisham is one of "only a few megaselling authors of popular fiction [who] deviate dramatically from formula". In line with this praise, they noted that "Grisham's fans may miss the stalwart lawyer-heroes and David vs. Goliath slant of his earlier work", given the fact that "every personage in this novel lies, cheats, steals and/or kills"; however, they concluded that "all will be captivated by this clever thriller that presents as crisp a cast as he's yet devised, and as grippingly sardonic yet bitingly moral a scenario as he's ever imagined".

The A.V. Club's Tasha Robinson also discussed how "The Brethren presents a curious speed bump in [Grisham's] decade-long ride on literary cruise control", adding that, "most notably, there isn't a single film-friendly hero here".

While Publishers Weekly referred to the plot as "expertly orchestrated and very complex plot", Robinson argued that "Grisham takes his time" connecting seemingly disconnected plot lines, and "even when the book finally coheres, the fireworks are minimal".

Robinson concluded, "The Brethren isn't especially exciting, nor is it especially glib. But it is suspiciously relevant to the current presidential election, as well as a satisfying break from Grisham-as-usual."

== See also ==
- Badger game
