= Mary Craig (writer) =

British journalist and writer (1928–2019)

Mary Craig

Mary Craig (2 July 1928 – 3 December 2019) was a British journalist and writer. She lived in Hampshire, England.

== Life ==
Craig was born in 1929 in St Helens. Her parents were Annie Mary (née Johnson) and the late William Joseph (Billy) Clarkson, motor salesman, who lived at the Scarisbrick Arms in St Helens. Her father had already died after being trapped with his car in a snow drift the year before and her five year old brother shared the same grave as he fell out of a train while going to his father's funeral.

She wrote fourteen books starting in 1978, including a trilogy on Tibet, biographies of personalities, including John Paul II, Lech Wałęsa and Frank Pakenham. She also wrote autobiographical works that addressed the death of Frank, her husband who died of cancer, and the story of their son suffering from Hurler syndrome. The website of her book Voices from Silence says, "Many of her books share a common theme of the examination of spirituality in the post war world."

She was the author of Kundun, the first biography of the 14th Dalai Lama to contextualize his story with that of his family members.

To write her book about the Chinese occupation of Tibet (Tears of Blood (1992)), she visited several times Dharamsala, home of the 14th Dalai Lama and of the Central Tibetan Administration, where she forges bonds of lasting friendships. In 1993, she made numerous visits to Dharamsala to interview members of the family of the Dalai Lama to write Kundun, regretting she could not meet the mother of the Dalai Lama, Dekyi Tsering (Amala), disappeared before her visit in North India.

== Publications ==
- Voices From Silence, 2010, ISBN 0956773907
- The Pocket Dalai Lama, 2002, Shambhala Pubns, ISBN 9781590300015
- His Holiness the Dalai Lama: In My Own Words, 2001, Hodder & Stoughton, ISBN 9780340785355
- Blessings: A Heartwarming Classic of Hope, Sorin Books; 2000, ISBN 1893732193
- Waiting for the sun: the harrowing story of a peasant boy in occupied Tibet, Hodder & Stoughton, 1999, ISBN 0340721995, ISBN 9780340721995
- Kundun - A Biography of the Family of the Dalai Lama, 1997, Counterpoint, Washington D.C., ISBN 978-1887178914
- The Last Freedom, Hodder & Stoughton, 1997, ISBN 034069078X
- Tears of Blood, HarperCollins, 1992, Counterpoint, 1999, ISBN 158243025X, ISBN 9781582430256
- Lech Walesa: the leader of Solidarity and campaigner for freedom and human rights in Poland, Exley, 1989, ISBN 1850151075
- Candles in the dark: six modern martyrs, Hodder and Stoughton, 1984, ISBN 0340342544
- The crystal spirit: Lech Wałęsa and his Poland, Coronet, 1986, ISBN 0340418958
- Man from a Far Country: A Portrait of Pope John Paul II, Hodder and Stoughton, 1979, ISBN 0340242353
- Blessings: an autobiographical fragment, Morrow, 1979, ISBN 068803456X
- Longford: a biographical portrait, Hodder and Stoughton, 1978, ISBN 0340232676

Spark from Heaven: The Mystery of the Madonna of Medjugorje Paperback – Aug 1988 by Mary Craig (Author)Publisher: Hodder & Stoughton Ltd (1 Jun. 1988) Language: English ISBN 0340416130 ISBN 978-0340416136
