= Margaret Beames =

New Zealand children's book author

Margaret Beames (18 October 1935 – 9 February 2016) was an author of children's books who lived in Feilding, New Zealand. Her first book was The Greenstone Summer, published in 1977. She had 42 books published, including one posthumously.

== Awards ==
Beames' 2000 book Oliver in the Garden won the Picture Book category and the Children's Choice Award at the 2001 New Zealand Post Book Awards for Children and Young Adults, and was included in the 2000 Storylines Notable Books List (Picture Books category), and the White Ravens list, organised by the International Youth Library. Four other books of hers were included on the Storylines Notable Books List: Storm on the 2000 Junior Fiction list; Outlanders on the 2001 Senior Fiction list; Duster on the 2003 Junior Fiction list; and Spirit of the Deep on the 2007 Young Adult Fiction list. Two of her books were finalists in the Junior Fiction category of the New Zealand Post Children's Book Awards, Archway Arrow in 1997, and The Shearwater Bell in 1998. She was the University of Otago College of Education Writer in Residence in 2005.

== Personal life ==
Beames was born in Oxford, England, and lived in Kenya for two years. In 1974, she moved to New Zealand and worked as a teacher for more than 30 years. She was married with two children and six grandchildren. She died on 9 February 2016.
