= Anil's Ghost =

2000 novel by Michael Ondaatje

- First edition
- Author: Michael Ondaatje
- Cover artist: John Gall
- Language: English
- Genre: Historical fiction, crime fiction
- Publisher: McClelland & Stewart
- Publication date: March 30, 2000
- Publication place: Canada
- Pages: 320
- ISBN: 0-7710-6893-X
- OCLC: 43391071

Anil's Ghost is the fourth novel by Michael Ondaatje. It was first published in 2000 by McClelland and Stewart.

Anil's Ghost follows the life of Anil Tissera, a native Sri Lankan who left to study in Britain and then the United States on a scholarship, during which time she has become a forensic pathologist. She returns to Sri Lanka in the midst of its merciless civil war as part of a human rights investigation by the United Nations. Anil, along with archaeologist Sarath Diyasena, discovers the skeleton of a recently murdered man in an ancient burial ground which is also a government-protected zone. Believing the murder to be politically motivated, Anil and Sarath set out to identify the skeleton, nicknamed Sailor, and bring about justice for the nameless victims of the war.

== Plot ==
The story opens up in early March as Anil arrives in Sri Lanka after a 15-year absence abroad. Her visit comes as a result of the increasing number of deaths in Sri Lanka from all the warring sides in the 1980s' civil war. While on an expedition with archeologist Sarath, Anil notices that the bones of a certain skeleton do not seem to be 6th century like the rest which leads her to conclude that the skeleton must be a recent death. Unsure where Sarath's political allegiance lies, Anil is skeptical of his help, but agrees to it anyway.

Along their journey to identify the skeleton, nicknamed Sailor, Anil becomes increasingly suspicious of Sarath. She begins to question his motives and sees his comments as a hint for her to censor herself since their discovery would implicate the Sri Lankan government in the death of Sailor. Later, Anil and Sarath visit his former teacher, Palipana, hoping to have him confirm their suspicions. Palipana then suggests having a reconstruction of the face done so that others might identify him. They agree to do so and head on to a small village named Galapitigama.

There Anil meets Sarath's brother, Gamini, an emergency doctor. She discovers that he is intricately involved in the country's affairs and daily struggles to save the lives of numerous victims. Gamini helps them with a fellow Sri Lankan whose hands have been nailed to a road, and tells them about the various atrocities citizens face as a result of the civil war. Later Anil and Sarath meet with Ananda, on the advice of Palipana, hoping that he will be able to reconstruct the face of Sailor for them. Ananda does so after some days, despite Anil's impatience and skepticism, and then almost immediately attempts suicide, only to be rescued by an intuitive and quick-thinking Anil. Anil and Sarath eventually are able to identify Sailor in a small village.

As Anil prepares a report to present to the authorities, claiming the skeleton as a recent death, and therefore evidence of state or state-sponsored terrorism, the skeleton of Sailor disappears. Frustrated, she goes on with her presentation, using another skeleton, but is upset when Sarath arrives after a lengthy and mysterious absence to ridicule her efforts and claim that she cannot back up her claims with the skeleton she has. Angry and betrayed, on her way out Anil is frequently stopped and inspected, and her belongings and research seized, such that by the time she leaves the building she is left with nothing. Outside, she meets Sarath, who surprises her with the body of Sailor that he has placed in a van. Sarath instructs Anil to prepare a fake report for the government and then leave the country the next morning on a plane that he arranged. Relieved, Anil does so in the hope that the evidence will be sufficient. Sarath's actions, however, have severe consequences, leading ultimately to his death. The novel ends with Ananda sculpting the eyes of a Buddha statue.

== Setting and historical context ==
Ondaatje set Anil's Ghost in his homeland of Sri Lanka. During the turbulent period in Sri Lanka from the mid-1980s to early 1990s, the characters in Anil's Ghost face the everyday struggles of living in a warring nation. During this time period, Sri Lanka is divided among three main warring sides with two ethnic groups and the government in a civil war. The novel places a major focus on war and its effects on individuals, families, and entire societies. Families have been torn apart because of the kidnappings or simply because of the stress of war that is too much of a burden.

== Major awards ==
Anil's Ghost is a recipient of the Governor General's Award for English-language fiction in 2000, and the Giller Prize.
