= Bare Bones (novel) =

2003 novel by Kathy Reichs

- First edition (US)
- Author: Kathy Reichs
- Language: English
- Series: Temperance Brennan
- Genre: Crime novel
- Publisher: Scribner (US); Heinemann (UK)
- Publication date: 2003
- Publication place: United States
- Media type: Print (hardback & paperback)
- Preceded by: Grave Secrets
- Followed by: Monday Mourning

Bare Bones is the sixth novel by Kathy Reichs starring forensic anthropologist, Temperance Brennan.

== Plot ==
In the Charlotte summer heat, Brennan is hoping to get away for a few days at the beach with her would-be lover, Detective Andrew Ryan. First she has to identify the skeleton of a newborn baby found in a wood stove; the baby was probably born to the missing daughter of a former colleague. Then a small plane flies into a rock face; the occupants may have been drug running. A picnic at Cowans Ford with Brennan's daughter Katy turns sour when her estranged husband's dog Boyd discovers mixed animal and human bones in a derelict outhouse. Is the headless body found in South Carolina linked, and who is sending Brennan e-mails telling her to back-off ? More puzzling, the drug runners and the animal (bear and rare bird) bones seem to be connected in a blatant CITES violation - the market for CITES animals and parts thereof being as hot as the drug market. Brennan, helped by Ryan and Detective "Skinny" Slidell, must try and piece together these seemingly random events and discover who is behind the racket.
