= Armelle Le Bras-Chopard =

French political scientist

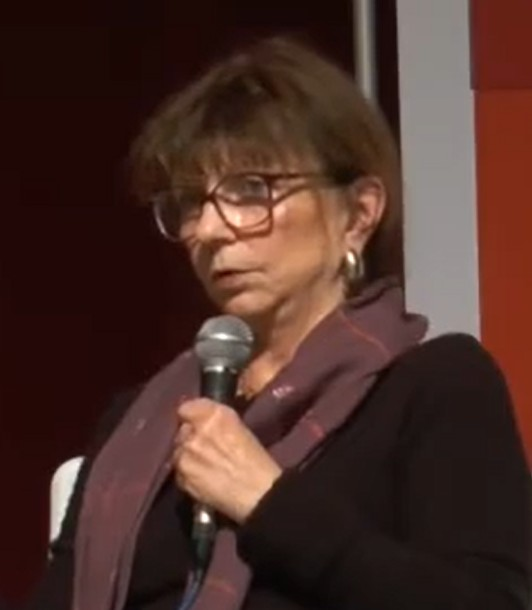
Armelle Le Bras-Chopard

Armelle Le Bras-Chopard is a French political scientist. She is a professor emeritus at the Université de Versailles Saint-Quentin-en-Yvelines. Her research encompasses democracy, socialism, war, and society, with particular reference to gender issues within these subjects. Her notable works include Première dame, second rôle (2009), Les putains du Diable. Le procès en sorcellerie des femmes (2006), Le masculin, le sexuel et le politique (2004), among others.

== Awards ==
She won the Prix Médicis du meilleur essai in 2000 for Le Zoo des philosophes.
