= Robert Cohen (novelist) =

American novelist

- Born: 1957 (age 68–69); United States
- Education: University of California, Berkeley; Columbia University (MFA)
- Occupation: Novelist
- Writing career
- Notable awards: Pushcart Prize (1987); Whiting Award (2000)

Robert Cohen (born 1957) is an American novelist and short fiction writer.

== Life ==
Cohen grew up in Westfield, New Jersey. He attended University of California, Berkeley and subsequently received his MFA from Columbia University.

== Works ==
Cohen's themes center around issues of contemporary identity and transcendence. His writing has been praised as "wild and ingenious" by The New York Times, "formidable" by The Atlantic Monthly, and "ruefully funny" by the San Francisco Chronicle. DG Meyers of A Commonplace Blog writes, "Sentence by sentence, Robert Cohen is perhaps the best prose stylist of any American novelist now writing."

His first novel, The Organ Builder, was praised by the New York Times Book Review as "an intimate, stunningly written portrait of a man and his reluctant confrontation with the past … all narrated in a voice that often approaches sheer poetry." His second, The Here and Now, won the Ribalow Prize for Best Jewish Novel of 1996. His third novel, Inspired Sleep, was called "a sparkling comic novel of postmodern pathologies…more than just a brilliant book – it's a transporting read" and "a great fat multiplex of a novel, beautifully written, funny, moving, sardonic and sad, it's a brilliantly executed indictment of our biomechanistic age, where there's a cure for every ache and, more importantly, an ache for every cure."

A collection of stories, The Varieties of Romantic Experience, was published in 2002; his most recent novel, Amateur Barbarians, in 2009. For these he has earned numerous awards, including a Guggenheim Fellowship, a Whiting Writers Award, a Lila Wallace Writers Award, and a Pushcart Prize.

A former Briggs-Copeland Lecturer at Harvard University, Cohen has also taught at the Iowa Writers Workshop, Rice University, the University of Houston, and SUNY Stony Brook. He currently teaches literature and creative writing at Middlebury College.

=== Books ===
- The Organ Builder. Harper & Row. 1988. ISBN 978-0-06015-909-2
- The Here and Now. Scribner. 1996. ISBN 978-0-68481-561-9
- Inspired Sleep: A Novel. Scribner. 2001. ISBN 978-068485-079-5
- The Varieties of Romantic Experience: Stories. Scribner. 2002. ISBN 978-074322-962-3
  - "The Varieties of Romantic Experience", Originally published in Harper's, February 1990
- Amateur Barbarians. Scribner. 2009. ISBN 978-074323-036-0
- Going to the Tigers: Essays and Exhortations. University of Michigan Press. 2022. ISBN 978-047207-555-3

=== Stories and essays ===
- "Going to the Tigers". The Believer. McSweeney's. February 2010.

== Awards ==
- 1987: Pushcart Prize
- 2000: Whiting Award
- 2003: Guggenheim Fellowship
- Lila Wallace/Reader's Digest Award
