= Samantha Gillison =

American writer

Samantha Gillison (born 1967) is an Australian-born American writer who frequently contributes to Salon.com and Condé Nast Traveler.

Gillison was born in Australia, of an Australian father and Canadian mother, but has lived overseas since she was two years old, although she retains her Australian citizenship. She lived for some years in Papua New Guinea, where her mother was doing anthropological studies and her father was a photographer. She used the PNG setting for her first novel, The Undiscovered Country (1998).

She attended Brown University, where she majored in ancient Greek, and has taught at Columbia University.

Peter Carey, who had never heard of Gillison before being sent a copy of The Undiscovered Country by her publisher, rang her to offer a very positive review for the dust jacket. In 2000, she was a recipient of the Whiting Award for her work in The Undiscovered Country.

== Works ==
She is the author of two novels:

- The Undiscovered Country, 1998. New York: Grove Press. ISBN 0-8021-1627-2
- The King of America: A novel, 2004. New York: Random House. ISBN 0-375-50819-8

She also wrote an article for "Children's Express" when she was 11 years old.

- "Samantha, The World's Youngest Anthro-ethnographer" Children's Express, 1979, New York, New York.
