= Kate Holt =

British photojournalist (born 1972)

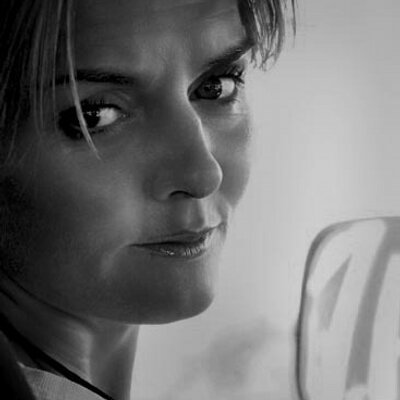
- Holt in 2012
- Born: 1972 (age 53–54); Zimbabwe
- Education: University of St Andrews
- Occupation: Photojournalist
- Awards: St Andrews, University - Exceptional Services Award
- Website: kateholt.com

Katherine Emily Holt (born 1972) is a British photojournalist, who works primarily across Africa and the Middle East to gather humanitarian and development stories for NGOs and private companies, as well as the UK and global media. She is also the director of communications agency, Arete.

== Early life and education ==
Holt was born in Zimbabwe in 1972 to British and South African parents. She grew up in Newfoundland and was educated in the UK at St Anne's, Windermere, from the age of eleven. Before going to university, she spent a year working in the Negru Voda Orphanage in Romania with HIV positive and disabled children. She returned there each summer during her years as a student. She completed her studies with a History Masters from St Andrew's University, Scotland, and a Post Graduate Diploma in Photojournalism from The London School of Printing, London.

== Career ==
Holt began her career with the BBC, working on Breakfast News and BBC News 24. Her first field experiences were in Kosovo, documenting the effects of the conflict on the civilian population. From there she went on to write her first investigative report which uncovered the trafficking of young girls from Eastern Europe into Bosnia and on to the UK. This work was published as a cover feature in The Sunday Times Magazine'' and in The Observer. It was the first time the issue of trafficking of women from Eastern Europe for sexual purposes was exposed.

In 1999, Holt moved to Nairobi, Kenya, to cover news events throughout East and West Africa. In 2001, after the September 11 attacks in the US, Holt travelled to Pakistan and documented the influx of refugees over the border form Afghanistan as US and British troops closed in on the Taliban. In 2003, Holt traveled into Iraq with the first medical convoy to offer support to both Basra and Nazariyah as the coalition troops toppled Saddam Hussein.

In 2009, Holt relocated to Kabul, Afghanistan and spent three years covering the ongoing conflict there for a variety of British newspapers including the Daily Mail, The Guardian and the Financial Times.

In February 2012, Holt launched Arete, a media and communications agency specialising in humanitarian storytelling, media strategy and training, and which produces content for NGOs, charities and corporations in order to tell "stories that make a difference".

In 2013, Holt was the first journalist to expose rape as a weapon of war being used by Somali soldiers against women living in refugee camps throughout Mogadishu. The story was published by The Guardian and subsequently numerous human rights groups have become engaged in the issue. A year later, in 2014, Holt was the first journalist to expose the sexual abuse of women in South Sudan following the return to war between South Sudanese Government soldiers and opposition forces. Holt covered the siege of the Westgate shopping Centre in Nairobi after it was attacked by Terrorists in 2013 and produced a series of photographs and stories for media outlets including the BBC.

Now based in the UK, Holt regularly travels to document the experiences of refugees and the effects of war and poverty on women and children in conflicts in countries like the Democratic Republic of the Congo, Liberia, Somalia, South Sudan, Kenya, Sudan, Zimbabwe, Iraq, Afghanistan and Haiti. She photographs for non-governmental organisations (NGOs) including UNICEF, Care International, Jhpiego, the International Committee of the Red Cross (ICRC), Médecins Sans Frontières and United Nations High Commissioner for Refugees (UNHCR).

Holt is a regular contributor to The BBC, The Guardian and The Mail on Sunday. Her work has also been published in The Independent, The Times, The Observer, Daily Mail, The Daily Telegraph and Financial Times.

== Reporting of sexual exploitation by UN Peacekeepers ==
In 2004 and 2005, Holt uncovered a story of sexual exploitation by United Nations Peacekeepers in the Democratic Republic of the Congo in a series of articles for The Independent. The story led to Kofi Annan announcing a 'Zero Tolerance' policy on the issue.

Holt went on to publish an article concerning an apparent cover-up by the UN in New York of sexual harassment by the United Nations High Commissioner for Refugees and the former Prime Minister of the Netherlands, Ruud Lubbers. Her article concerned an OIOS report that stated Lubbers had sexually harassed members of his staff. The report, which had later been reviewed following challenges to its verdict, was found to be deficient in reasoning as there was no corroboratory evidence from the other witnesses to the alleged harassment. For this reason, the UN decided not to publish the report. Ruud Lubbers resigned from his post after Holt's article was published due to the negative publicity, although he maintained that he was innocent of any allegations. Kofi Annan, whilst accepting his resignation, also stated that the findings that the allegations had no substance, were still valid.

== Trusteeships ==
Holt is a trustee of RE:ACT disaster response and the Royal Humane Society.

== Arete ==
In February 2012, Holt launched Arete – a media and communications agency that specialises in humanitarian storytelling, media strategy, content production and training for NGOs, charities and corporations. She is director of the company and regularly undertakes assignments for Arete's clients.

== Awards ==
In 1996, while at St Andrews, the University awarded Holt a prize for exceptional services to a community for her work in Romanian orphanages.

Holt has been nominated twice for the Amnesty Award for Humanitarian Reporting. Once in 2005 for her series of articles entitled when peacemakers become predators and again in 2010 for a photographic series on Elderly people in Zimbabwe.

She was highly commended by Amnesty International for her coverage of the drought crisis in the Horn of Africa in 2011.

== Exhibitions ==
In 2003, Holt traveled to Iraq and photographed the impact of the UK and US invasion on the civilian population in Basra and Nazariah. The work produced was exhibited in London and Angers in France. The exhibition, entitled 'Victory' was supported by the playwright Harold Pinter and Tariq Ali, both of whom supported the anti-war movement. The photographs were used by Amnesty International for their campaign to end the use of cluster bombs and illegal weapons by the Coalition Forces in Iraq.

Between 2010 and 2011, Holt was embedded with AMISOM troops from Uganda and Burundi on the frontline of Mogadishu. As well as producing a body of work on behalf of AMISOM she trained six Ugandan and Burundian soldiers in photography. The results of this training and her own work were exhibited in the Nairobi National Museum, Kenya in October 2011 in an exhibition entitled Brothers in Arms. The exhibition subsequently traveled to the National Museum in Uganda and the UN Exhibition Centre in Burundi and now resides on the AMISOM base in Mogadishu International Airport.

- 1999: Plight of a People, The White Horse Gallery, London. Photographs of the Kosovan Refugee Crisis 1999 – Solo Exhibition.
- 2001: Fleeing Afghanistan, The Gold Gallery, London. Photographs of Afghan Refugees taken in Pakistan and Afghanistan in 2001 – Solo Exhibition.
- 2004: Don Bosco, President's House, Brussels. Portraits of children taken in Don Bosco Orphanage Goma, Democratic Republic of Congo.
- 2004: Victory, The Spitz Gallery London. Solo Exhibition backed by Harold Pinter, Tariq Ali and Human Rights Watch.
- 2004: Victory, Angers, France. Images of the Aftermath of War in Iraq.
- 2006: The Human Face of Gun Violence, UN Secretariat, New York. A joint exhibition funded by IANSA and the Human Dialogue Centre to mark the opening of the UN Review Confe:rence on the Small Arms Trade.
- 2006: Men and Guns, The Dutch Foreign Ministry, The Hague. A joint exhibition, with Heidi Schumann, funded by the Human Dialogue Centre.
- 2007: Men and Guns, 116th Assembly of Inter Parliamentary Union, Bali. A joint exhibition, with Heidi Schumann, funded by the Human Dialogue Centre.
- 2007: Human Face of Gun Violence, Museum of Pristina, Kosova. A joint exhibition funded by IANSA and the Human Dialogue Centre.
- 2008: Old People of Kyrgyzstan, Helpage International Bishkek, Kyrgyzstan. A joint exhibition with Malik Alymkuloff organized by Helpage International Bishkek, Kyrgyzstan.
- 2008: World Food Crisis Photography Exhibition, New York. Participator in a fund raising exhibition and multi-media event in New York in support of the Nuru Project.
- 2010: Care International Photographic Exhibition, Thames Path in London. Participator in an awareness raising exhibition on the Thames Path in London
- 2011: Hidden Faces – Women in Afghanistan, House of Commons, London. Exhibition in the House of Commons to promote awareness of women's rights in Afghanistan.
- 2011: Brothers in Arms, Nairobi National Museum. Portraying the role of the African Union in Mogadishu, Somalia. Nairobi.
- 2012: Brothers in Arms, Kampala National Museum. Portraying the role of the African Union in Mogadishu, Somalia. Kampala.
- 2012: Brothers in Arms, Bujumbura UN Information Centre. Exhibition in Bujumbura UN Information Centre portraying the role of the African Union in Mogadishu, Somalia. Bujumbura.
- 2013: Children of Somalia, EU Somali Conference, EU Parliament, Brussels. Exhibition showing photographs taken by Somali Children as part of a Photoclub Project run by Holt in conjunction with UNICEF Somalia, as well as a selection of Holt's work from Somalia to mark the EU Somali Conference
- 2013: Unseen Enemy Exhibition, National Army Museum in London. Exhibition exploring the use of IEDs in Afghanistan.
- 2016: Shared Success: Agriculture Transformation @ 10, Nairobi National Museum in Kenya. Exhibition for the Rockefeller Foundation and AGRA to celebrate the success of farmers and small-scale businessmen and women in four of the 18 African countries that the Rockefeller Foundation and AGRA have been assisting over the past decade.
- 2017: South Sudan: The Cost of a Relentless War. Panel discussion about the human cost of the war in South Sudan and what the future holds for the world's newest country with a selection of photos taken by Kate Holt for UNICEF in South Sudan, at the Frontline Club, London
- 2017: London Somali Conference. Exhibition of photographs demonstrating the consequences of the ongoing drought in Somalia in Whitehall, London
- 2017: Guardian: Faces of Modern Slavery. Holt contributed photography and writing to the Guardian's Faces of Modern Slavery project that documents harrowing examples of modern-day slavery in different countries that will be on display at Kings Place, London
- 2018: Brave: The Girls of South Sudan. Exhibition showing photographs taken by Kate on assignment with PLAN International UK in South Sudan, at the Gallery@OXO, London, UK
- 2018: Vaccine Heroes. Exhibition showing photographs taken by Kate on assignment with GAVI in Quai du Mont-Blanc, Geneva, Switzerland
- 2019: Brave: The Girls of South Sudan. Exhibition showing photographs taken by Kate on assignment with PLAN International UK in South Sudan, at the Midlands Arts Centre, Birmingham
- 2019: Brave: The Girls of South Sudan. Exhibition showing photographs taken by Kate on assignment with PLAN International UK in South Sudan, at the Assembly Rooms, Edinburgh
- 2019: Kibera: Living in the slum. Taking an in-depth look at the developing world and its issues through the prism and people who live in Kibera, photographs by Kate and photographers from Kibera were hung in an exhibition at King's Place, in London, UK
- 2021:Refugee to Entrepreneur: All They Need Is Opportunity. An outdoor exhibition showcasing Kate's photographs of refugees in Uganda. This London-based exhibition aims for viewers to "walk amongst these inspiring people, read their stories and learn about the power of an opportunity."

== Gallery ==
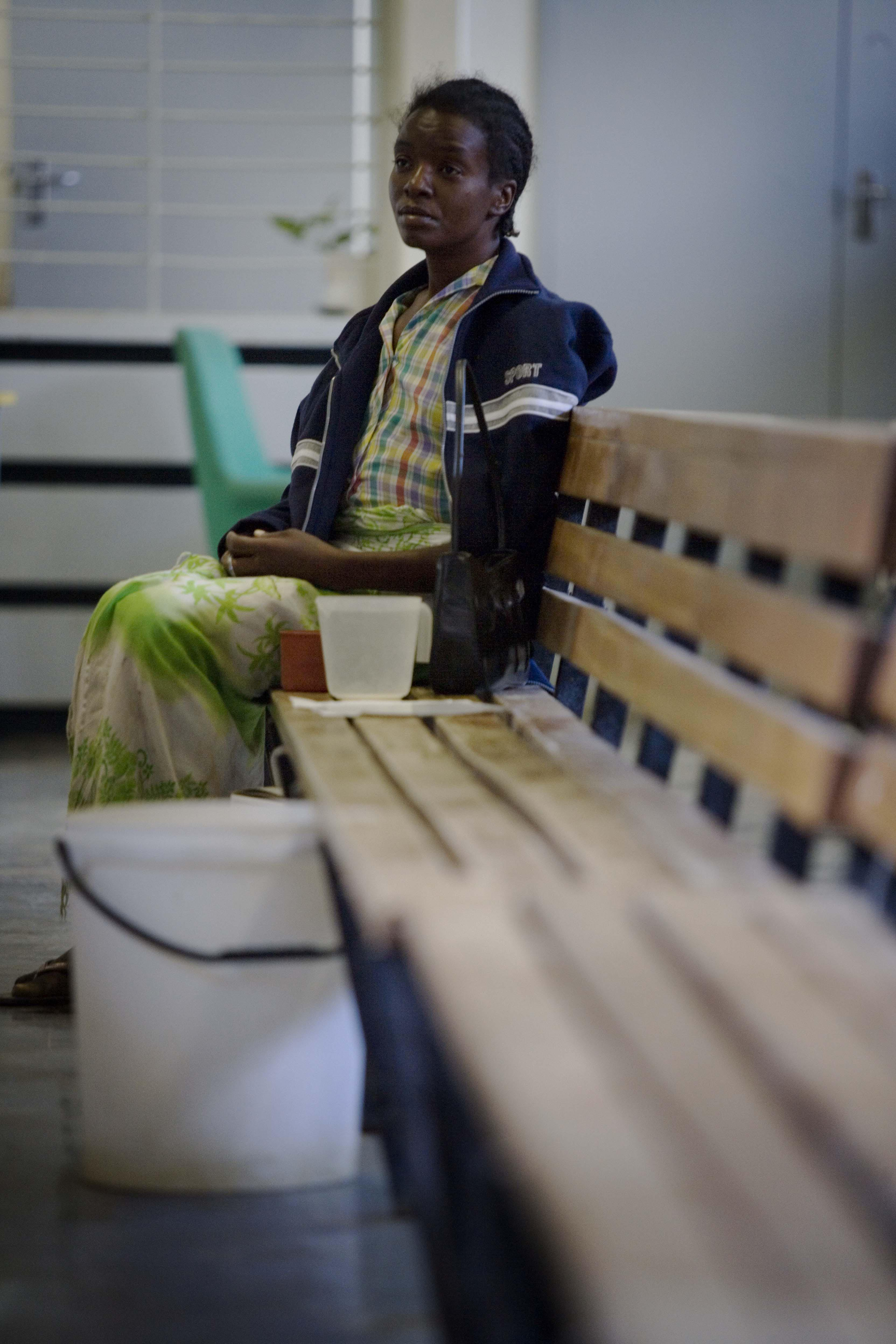
A woman waits to be tested at a cholera treatment centre in the Budiriro District, that was badly affected by cholera, in Harare, Zimbabwe on the 21 April 2009.

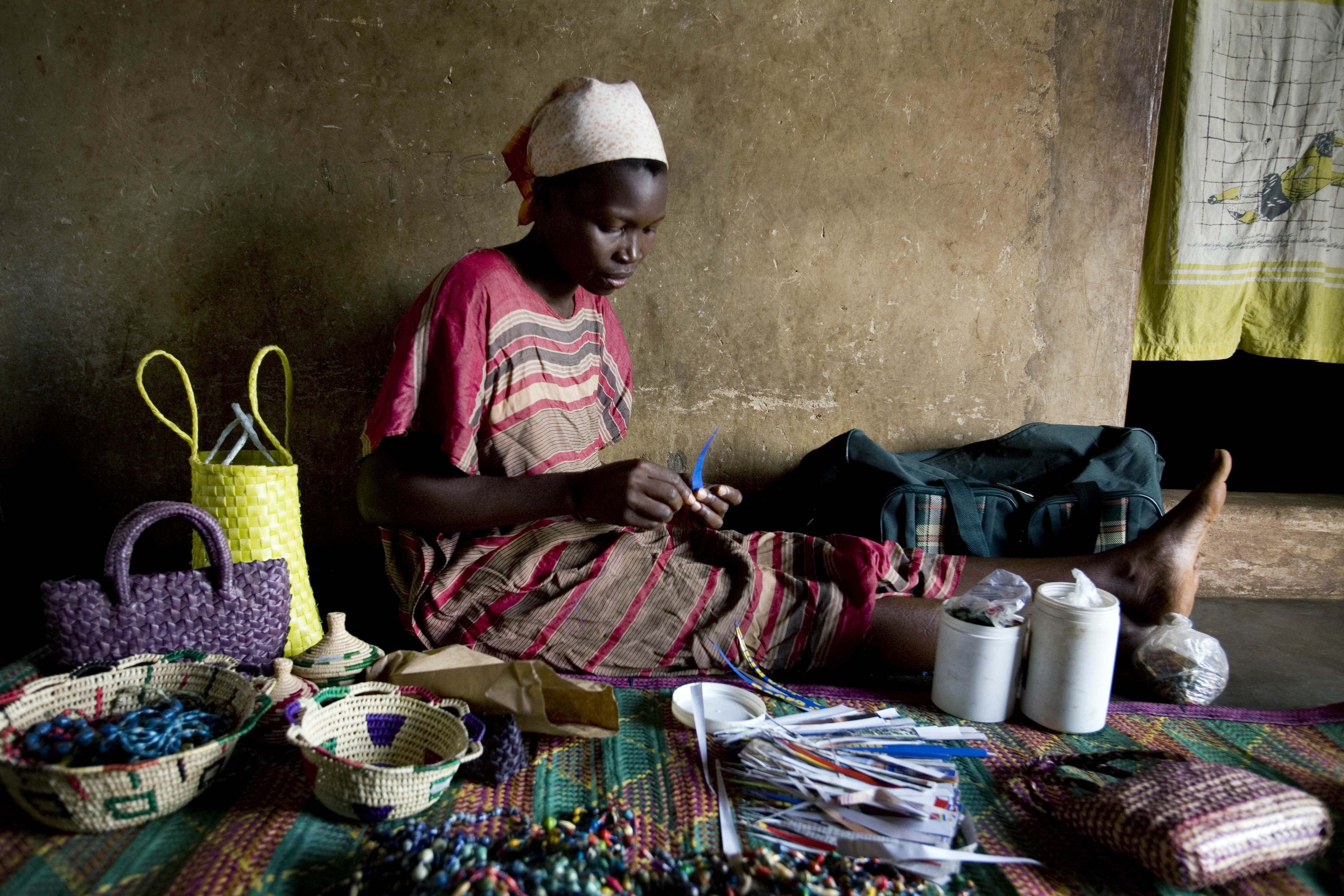
Annette Nandase, a beneficiary of the Beads of Hope Mbuya project, threads beads inside her home in the Mbuya district of Kampala, Uganda on 10 March 2009.

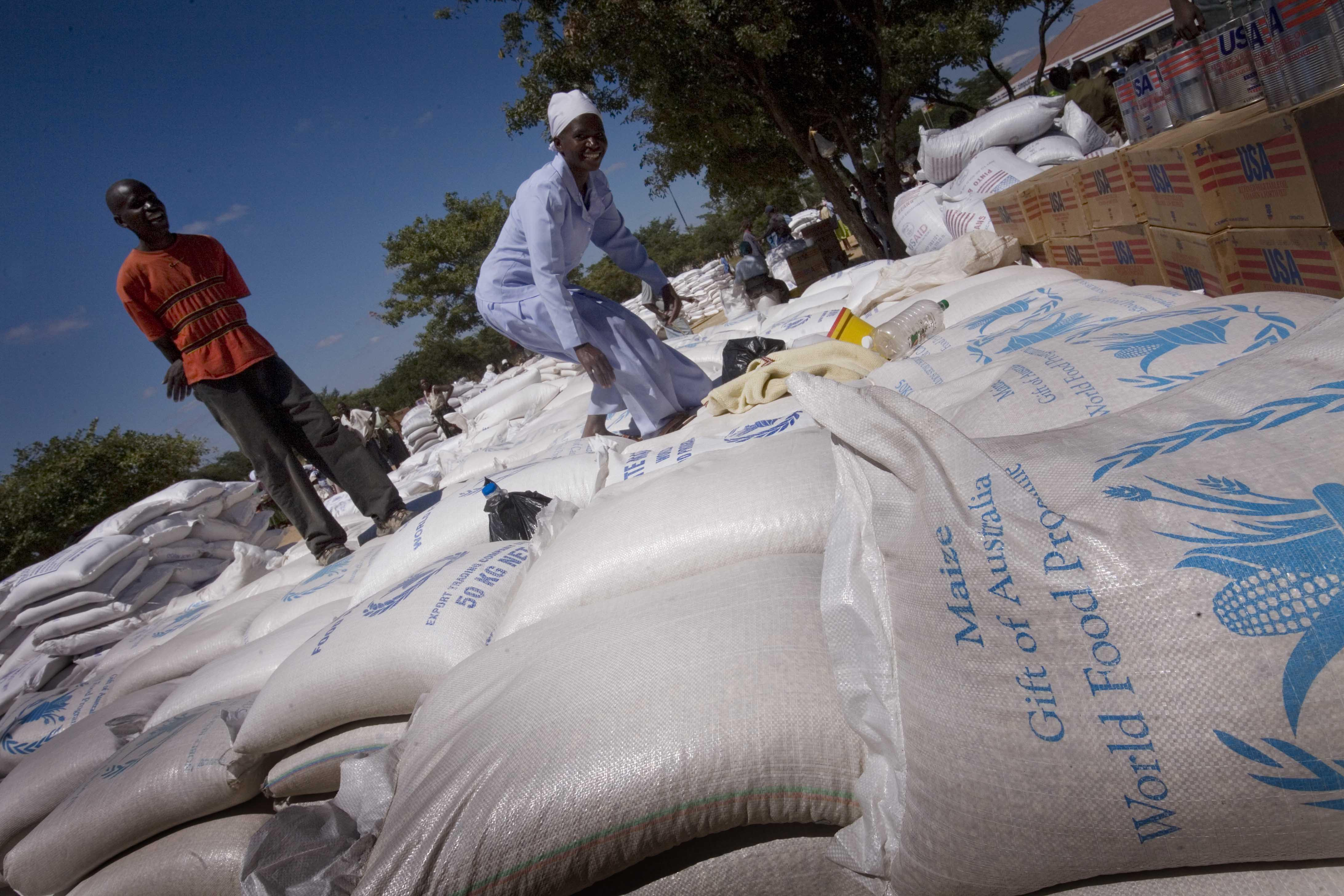
Bags of food aid, donated by the Australian Government, are piled up at a food distribution point in Epworth, in Harare, Zimbabwe on 23 April 2009.

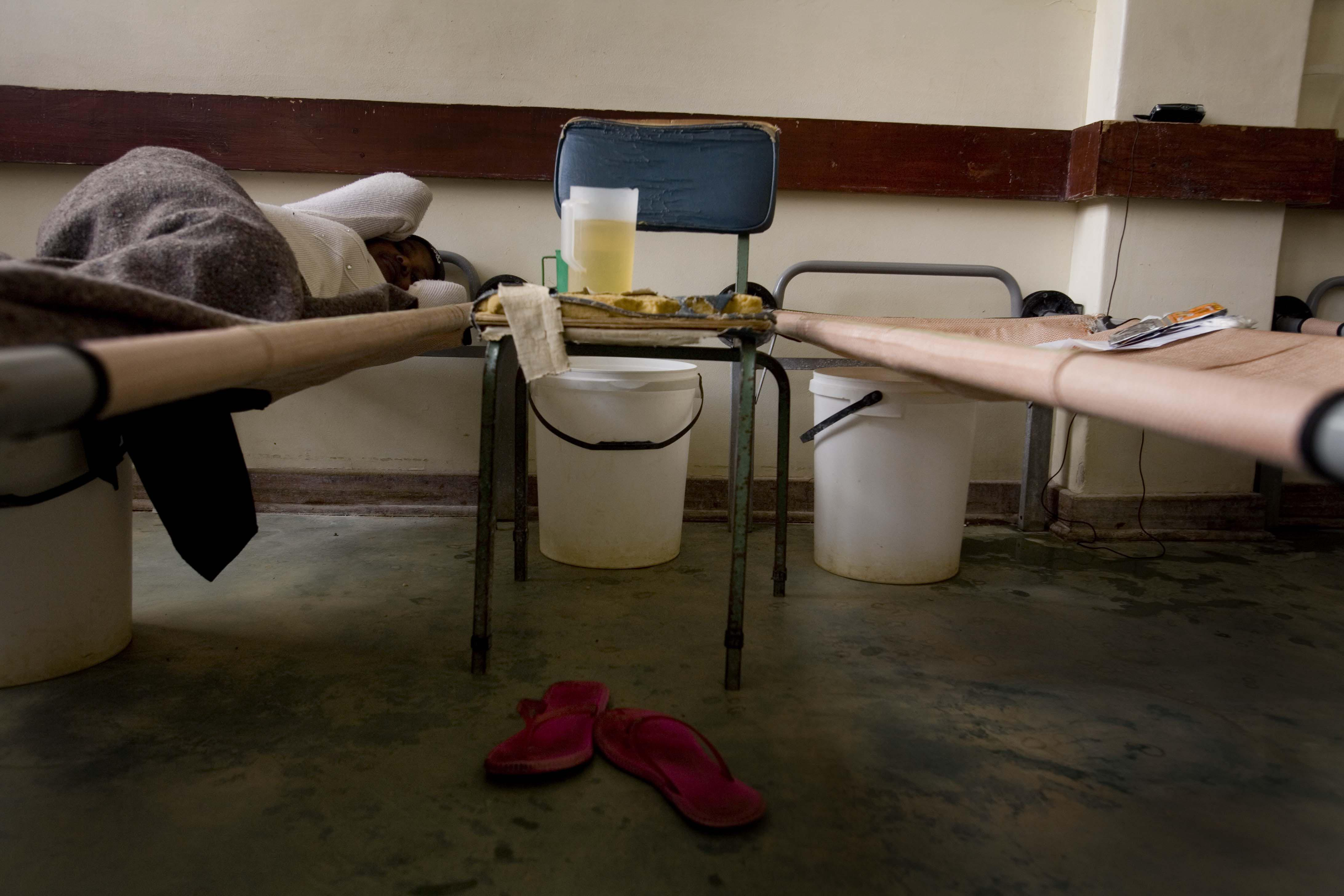
Patients lie in bed at a cholera treatment centre in the Budiriro District, that was badly affected by cholera, in Harare, Zimbabwe on 21 April 2009.
