= John McManus (author) =

American novelist and short story writer

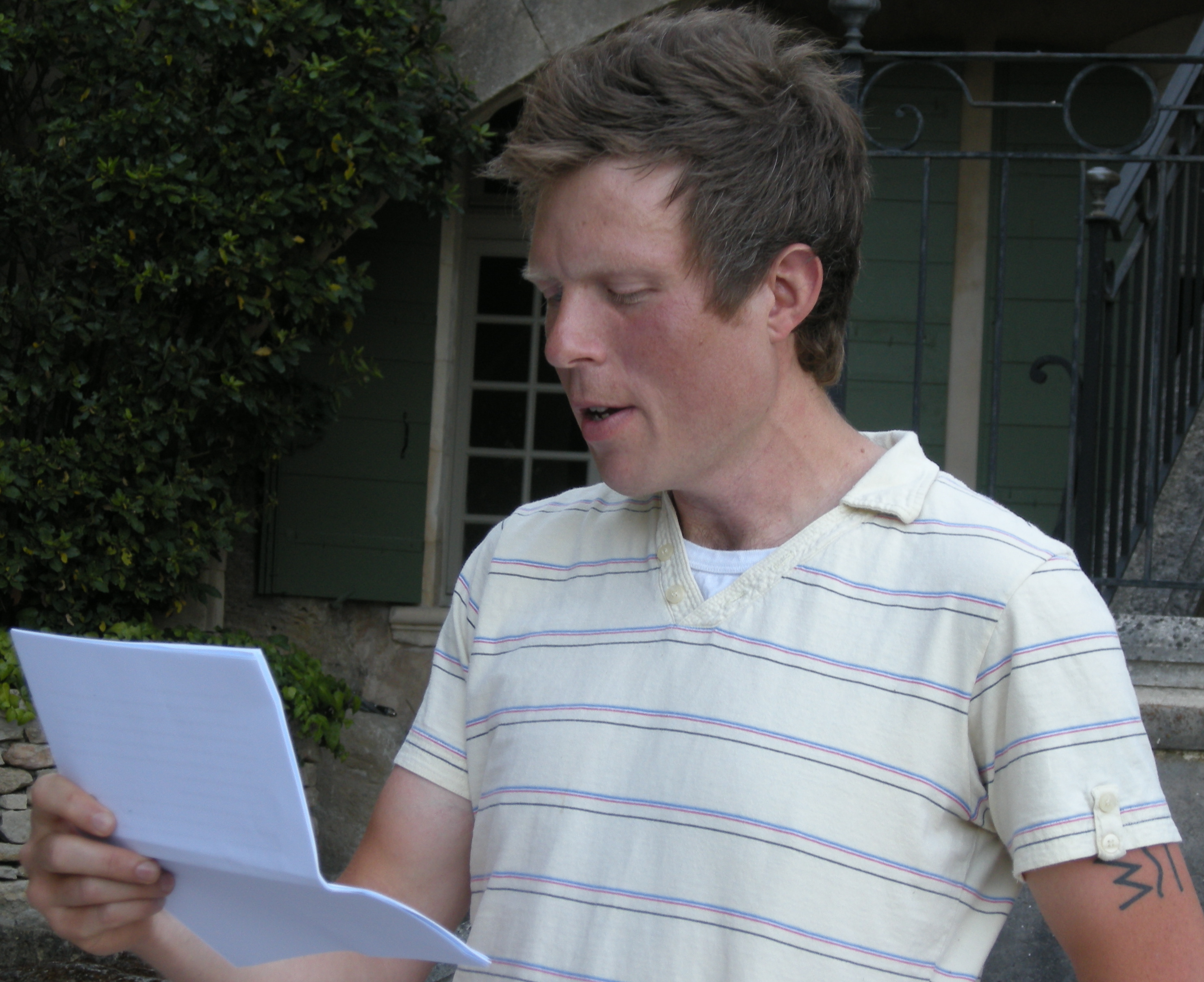
McManus reading in Norfolk

John McManus is an American novelist and short story writer. He is the author of a novel, Bitter Milk, and the short story collections Born on a Train, Stop Breakin Down, and Fox Tooth Heart. In recognition of Stop Breakin Down, McManus became the youngest ever recipient of the Whiting Award. In 2019 he received a Literature Award from the American Academy of Arts and Letters.

McManus is a contributing editor for literary publisher Fiddleblack. He teaches creative writing at Old Dominion University and Goddard College.

In 2013, McManus contributed an essay to a limited edition of Clive Barker's novella, Cabal.
