= Flora the Frog =

2000 children's picture book

- Author: Shirley Isherwood
- Illustrator: Anna C. Leplar
- Language: English
- Genre: Children's picture book
- Published: 2000 (Bloomsbury Children's Books)
- Publication place: England
- Media type: Print (paperback)
- Pages: 25 (unpaginated)
- ISBN: 9780747544791
- OCLC: 44057807

Flora the Frog is a 2000 Children's picture book by Shirley Isherwood and Anna Leplar. It is about a girl, Flora, who initially doesn't want to be a frog in a school play but after seeing some real frogs decides she wants to after all.

== Reception ==
A review in Books for Keeps of Flora the Frog wrote "The pale pastel pictures are softly compassionate throughout, with lots of humorous details." and concluded "A story to touch the hearts of all mothers, teachers and child performers."

Children's Books Ireland called it "A charming expressively illustrated tale."

Flora the Frog has also been reviewed by Booklist, School Library Journal, and The Horn Book Magazine.
