= The Other Side of Truth =

2000 book by Beverley Naidoo

- 2000 edition with award seal
- Author: Beverley Naidoo
- Language: English
- Genre: Children's novel
- Publisher: Puffin Books
- Publication date: January 2000
- Publication place: United Kingdom
- Media type: Print
- Pages: 227 pp (first edition)
- ISBN: 978-0-14-130476-2
- OCLC: 43377395
- LC Class: PZ7.N1384 Ot 2000
- Followed by: Web of Lies

The Other Side of Truth is a young adult novel about Nigerian political refugees, written by Beverley Naidoo and published by Puffin in 2000. It is set in the autumn of 1995 during the reign in Nigeria of the despot General Abacha, who is waging a campaign of suppression against journalists. A Nigerian girl and her younger brother must leave suddenly after their mother is killed in a failed assassination of their outspoken father. They are sent to London but are abandoned and must cope with the police, social services and school bullies. Naidoo won the 2000 Carnegie Medal, recognising the best children's or young adults' book in English published in the United Kingdom during the preceding school year.

A sequel, Web of Lies, was published by Amistad Press in 2006. This story deals with the problems faced by Femi while the family is waiting to hear if asylum is to be granted. It was nominated for an Angus Book Award in 2001.

== Plot summary ==
A third person novel presenting the perspective of a 12-year-old girl, Sade Solaja. Her father, Folarin Solaja, is a journalist, one of the most critical of the corrupt regime. The book opens with Sade's memory of hearing the two shots which ended her mother's life, a memory which recurs throughout the novel in her thoughts and dreams. Her memories of Nigeria are often set in contrast to her experiences of an alien England, while her mother's remembered words of wisdom give her comfort and strength. The concentration on Sade's point of view makes many events seem obscure and confusing, just as she experiences them.

After the shooting, Sade's Uncle Tunde urges her father to send her and her 10-year-old brother Femi to safety in England where their Uncle Dele lives. They are forced to pack and leave suddenly and secretly. They fly to London posing as the children of a stranger, Mrs Bankole, so that they can travel on her passport. When their Uncle Dele fails to collect them at the airport, Mrs Bankole abandons them at a coffee shop near Victoria Station. Moneyless and friendless, they wander the streets looking for the art college where their uncle works. They find refuge in a video store, but the owner calls the police, believing them to be vandals. Thus they come to the attention of the authorities. Worried about telling the truth in case it endangers their father, Sade takes refuge in silence and later in half-truths. The children are fostered first by Mrs Graham and her rude and mean son Kevin and later by the Kings, a Jamaican couple whose children have grown up and left. They are sent to different schools. Sade is sent to Avon High School where she meets a girl from Somalia, called Mariam, whose story is similar to Sade's. Marcia and Donna the bullies from school treat Sade very badly, putting pressure on her to steal a turquoise lighter from Mariam's uncle's store. Femi goes to Greenslades Primary School. They become reticent with each other.

It later emerges that Sade's worried father has entered England illegally to look for them but has been arrested. There is a chance that he will be deported to face certain death in Nigeria, especially as the Nigerian police claim he is wanted for his wife's murder. Although Iyawo Jenny and Mr Nathan try their hardest to help Sade's father, things are not working out. Sade braves the freezing night to speak to "Mr. Seven O'clock", the newscaster whom she has seen on television, to bring her father's story to the attention of the British public. The story ends with her father's release for Christmas and letter writing to their grandma, though asylum has yet to be granted. They hope that one day they can return safely to Nigeria. Sade misses her grandmother and her former life.

== Themes ==
The book consists of several themes. The most important and recognisable are:

- Refugees
- Clash of cultures (adaptation and tolerance)
- Freedom of speech vs. censorship
- Democracy vs. dictatorship
- Discrimination and prejudice
- Human rights
- The truth
- Coming of age
- Asylum
- Loss and displacement

== Awards ==
The Other Side of Truth won a UK Arts Council Award for work in progress. After publication it won the British librarians (CILIP) Carnegie Medal in 2000 as the year's best children's book. A retrospective citation by CILIP says that it "skilfully blends fact and fiction to leave a lasting impression of real issues at work" and describes it as: "An important book which challenges the notion of 'truth' itself." It further describes the writing as "gripping, powerful and evocative".

The Other Side of Truth was silver runner up for the 2000 Nestlé Smarties Book Prize, was named an International Board on Books for Young People Honour Book in 2002, and won the 2002 Jane Addams Children's Book Award.

== Allusions to historical events ==
The novel is set in the immediate aftermath of the execution of Ken Saro-Wiwa and other journalists, which caused an international outcry in 1995. It also mentions the civil war in Somalia.

== See also ==
- "This Side of the Truth", a poem by Dylan Thomas

Awards
Preceded by Postcards from No Man's Land	Carnegie Medal recipient 2000	Succeeded by The Amazing Maurice and his Educated Rodents
