= Deadly Décisions =

2000 novel by Kathy Reichs

- First edition (US)
- Author: Kathy Reichs
- Language: English
- Series: Temperance Brennan
- Genre: Crime novel
- Publisher: Scribner (US); Heinemann (UK)
- Publication date: 2000
- Publication place: United States
- Media type: Print (hardback & paperback)
- ISBN: 0-09-930710-3
- OCLC: 46693978
- Preceded by: Death du Jour
- Followed by: Fatal Voyage

Deadly Décisions is the third novel by Kathy Reichs starring forensic anthropologist Temperance Brennan.

== Plot ==
Brennan is called back to Montréal, Quebec, Canada from teaching at the FBI Academy in Quantico when a biker gang war turns violent. Excavating at a biker clubhouse reveals the bones of a young girl from Myrtle Beach, South Carolina. Brennan has herself assigned to work with Operation Carcajou, a multijurisdictional task force created to investigate criminal activities among outlaw motorcycle gangs in the Province of Quebec. Her investigations are hampered by the lack of co-operation of Sergeant-Detective Luc Claudel, while would-be love interest Lieutenant-detective Andrew Ryan is unable to help due to being under investigation for corruption.

Meanwhile, Brennan's teenage nephew Kit, having fallen out with his father and with his mother (Brennan's sister Harry) away, comes to stay and exhibits a worrying interest in Harley-Davidsons and their riders. Can Brennan find out how the girl's remains ended up in Montreal, help to bring the killers to justice, and keep Kit away from involvement with the biker gangs?

== Critical reception ==
Publishers Weekly stated the novel had a "Stiff, storyboard feel" but "overall, the novel works, but the gears show one time too many". The Observer reviewed the audio book, read by Katherine Borowitz. Kim Bunce said that the dialogue of the novel, "provided the charmingly American-accented Katherine Borowitz with a fine script that allows the listener to become heavily engrossed in the complicated plot without losing it."
