= Kathy Reichs =

American writer and forensic anthropologist

Kathy J. Reichs CM
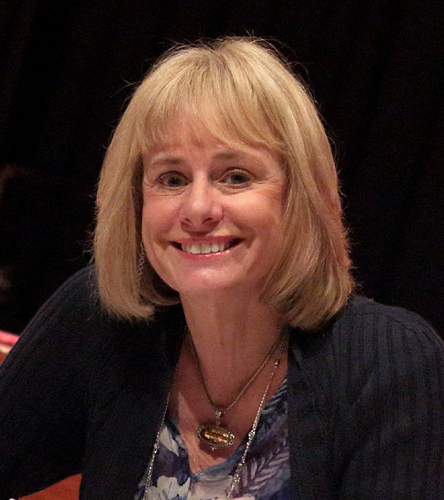
- Reichs in 2013
- Born: Kathleen Joan Toelle; July 7, 1948 (age 78); Chicago, Illinois, U.S.
- Education: American University (BA); Northwestern University (MA, PhD)
- Occupations: Forensic anthropologist; novelist; professor; Producer
- Spouse: Paul Reichs
- Children: 3
- Writing career
- Genre: Crime
- Notable works: Break No Bones (2006) Bones (2005–2017)
- Website: www.kathyreichs.com

Kathleen Joan Reichs (née Toelle, born July 7, 1948) is an American crime writer, forensic anthropologist and academic. She is a professor emerita of anthropology at the University of North Carolina at Charlotte. She is well known for inspiring the television series Bones.

== Early life and education ==
Kathleen Joan Toelle was born in 1948 in Chicago, Illinois.

She earned her Bachelor of Arts degree with a major in anthropology from American University in 1971. In 1972, she completed her Master of Arts in physical anthropology at Northwestern University, where, in 1975, she completed her PhD, also in physical anthropology.

== Academia and anthropology ==
Since 1975, Reichs has taught at Northern Illinois University, University of Pittsburgh, Concordia University, and McGill University, and currently holds a position as professor emerita of anthropology at the University of North Carolina at Charlotte. In the past, Kathy Reichs has consulted for the Office of the Chief Medical Examiner in North Carolina.

Reichs has appeared in Tanzania to testify at the United Nations's International Criminal Tribunal for Rwanda. She has assisted Clyde Snow and the Foundation for Guatemalan Forensic Anthropology in an exhumation in the area of Lake Atitlan in the highlands of southwest Guatemala. She was a member of the Disaster Mortuary Operational Response Team assigned to assist at the World Trade Center disaster.

She is one of 100 anthropologists certified by the American Board of Forensic Anthropology and is on the board of directors of the American Academy of Forensic Sciences. She is also affiliated with the Laboratoire des Sciences Judiciaires et de Médecine Légale for the province of Quebec.

== Fiction ==
In addition to technical books, as of January 2019, Reichs has written 23 novels, which have been translated into 30 languages. 20 of those novels constitute the "Temperance Brennan" series. Her first novel, Déjà Dead, won the 1997 Arthur Ellis Award for Best First Novel.

The fictional heroine in her novels, Temperance "Tempe" Brennan, is also a forensic anthropologist. Her lifestyle closely mimics that of her creator, with Reichs stating that Brennan and she "have the same CV" and that "Some of Tempe's personality traits are also mine," but there are differences in their personal lives, such as the character's alcoholism. A good portion of the novels are based on real life science, and Reichs has stated that she is "fastidiously conscientious about getting the science right." She has used experience from her career in her novels and said about Déjà Dead that "Everything I describe in the book, I actually did." In the novel Grave Secrets, she uses her experience from her visit to Guatemala.

She has also co-written (with her son Brendan) the young adult novels series named Virals, centered on Tempe's great-niece, Tory Brennan, and a pack of her friends, Ben, Hiram, Shelton, and wolfdog Cooper.

A stand-alone novel, Two Nights, published July 11, 2017, features Sunday Night, a tough-talking, scarred heroine.

== Television ==
The 2005 Fox television series Bones is inspired by Reichs' life and novels. The series borrows the name of her books' heroine, Temperance "Bones" Brennan. As in the books, Brennan (Emily Deschanel) is a forensic anthropologist; however, there are many differences: the television character is younger, more socially awkward, and is based in the Jeffersonian, a fictionalized version of the Smithsonian Institution in Washington, D.C. Additionally, the Brennan character in the TV series moonlights as an author, writing about a fictional forensic anthropologist named Kathy Reichs. Aside from the character's name and occupation, there are few similarities between the TV show and the novels.

Reichs worked as a producer on the show to "keep the science honest." She appeared in the second-season episode "Judas on a Pole", playing Professor Constance Wright, a forensic anthropologist on the Jeffersonian's board of trustees who conducts Zack Addy's dissertation defense.

Reichs wrote the season five episode, "The Witch in the Wardrobe," the season nine episode, "The Dude in the Dam," and wrote the season eleven episode, "The Stiff in the Cliff" with her daughter Kerry.

== Casey Anthony murder trial ==
In 2011, Reichs was an expert witness in the Casey Anthony murder trial. Reichs was reluctant to get involved, but later agreed and performed a full skeletal analysis of Anthony's daughter, Caylee, but could not determine a cause of death. She was, however, able to conclude that there was no evidence of abuse and that the child appeared to be well-nourished.

== Personal life ==
In 1968 Kathy married her husband Paul Reichs who worked as a lawyer. Together the Reichs have two daughters and a son, the names of whom are Kerry Elisabeth Reichs, Courtney Anne Reichs, and Brendan Christopher Reichs.

== Selected works ==
=== Academic papers ===
- Reichs, Kathleen J. (October 1993). "Quantified comparison of frontal sinus patterns by means of computed tomography". Forensic Science International. 61 (2–3): 141–68. doi:10.1016/0379-0738(93)90222-v. PMID 8307523.
- Grynpas, Marc D.; Huckell, C.B.; Reichs, K.J.; Derousseau, C.J.; Greenwood, C.; Kessler, M.J. (August 1993). "Effect of age and osteoarthritis on bone mineral in rhesus monkey vertebrae". Journal of Bone and Mineral Research. 8 (8). American Society for Bone and Mineral Research: 909–17. doi:10.1002/jbmr.5650080803. PMID 8213253. S2CID 21510646.
- Reichs, Kathleen J. (June 1992). "Forensic anthropology in the 1990s". The American Journal of Forensic Medicine and Pathology. 13 (2): 146–53. doi:10.1097/00000433-199206000-00014. PMID 1510066.
- Reichs, Kathleen J. (July 1989). "Treponematosis: a possible case from the late prehistoric of North Carolina". American Journal of Physical Anthropology. 79 (3): 289–303. doi:10.1002/ajpa.1330790305. PMID 2669501.
- Reichs, K. J. (January 1989). "Cranial suture eccentricities: a case in which precocious closure complicated determination of sex and commingling". Journal of Forensic Sciences. 34 (1): 263–73. doi:10.1520/JFS12632J. PMID 2918285.
- DeRousseau, CJ; Reichs, KJ (July 1987). "Ontogenetic plasticity in nonhuman primates: I. Secular trends in the Cayo Santiago macaques". American Journal of Physical Anthropology. 73 (3): 279–87. doi:10.1002/ajpa.1330730302. PMID 3618758.

=== Academic books ===
- Forensic Osteology: Advances in the Identification of Human Remains (1st ed.). Springfield: Charles C. Thomas. 1986. ISBN 9780398068042.
- Reichs, Kathy, ed. (1983). Hominid Origins: Inquiries Past and Present. University Press of America. ISBN 9780819128645.

=== Temperance Brennan series ===
No.	Title	Published	ISBNs	Notes
1	Déjà Dead	1997	Paperback: 0-09-925518-9; Audio CD: 1-449-83348-9	New York Times Best Seller Won the 1997 Arthur Ellis Award for Best First Novel 1997 Kirkus Reviews – starred review 1997 Library Journal – starred review 1997 Publishers Weekly – starred review 1998 Dilys Award – Mystery Novel (Nominee)
2	Death du Jour	1999	Paperback: 0-09-925519-7; Hardcover: 0-684-84118-5; Audio CD: 0-754-05330-X	
3	Deadly Décisions	2000	Paperback: 0-09-930710-3; Hardback: 0-434-00820-6	
4	Fatal Voyage	2001	Paperback: 0-09-930720-0; Audio CD: 1-85686-927-X	
5	Grave Secrets	2002	Paperback: 0-09-930730-8; Audio CD: 1-85686-928-8	
6	Bare Bones	2003	Paperback: 0-09-944147-0	
7	Monday Mourning	2004	Paperback: 0-09-944148-9	
8	Cross Bones	2005	Paperback: 0-09-944149-7; Hardback: 0-434-01040-5; Audio CD: 1-85686-985-7	
9	Break No Bones	2006	Hardback: 0-434-01042-1; Paperback: 0-434-01544-X	
10	Bones to Ashes	2007	Hardback: 978-0434014620; Paperback: 978-1416525653	2007 Publishers Weekly – starred review
11	Devil Bones	2008	Hardback: 978-0743294386; Paperback: 978-1-4391-5440-3; Audio CD: 978-1846571336	
12	206 Bones	2009	Hardback: 978-0743294393; Paperback: 978-0-4340-2005-8	
13	Spider Bones	2010	Hardback: 978-1439102398; Paperback: 978-0-0995-5686-2	Released as Mortal Remains in UK and Australia in hardback, reverted to Spider Bones for paperback release.
14	Flash and Bones	2011	978-1439102411	
15	Bones are Forever	2012	978-0434021130	
16	Bones of the Lost	2013	978-1476754741	
17	Bones Never Lie	2014	Hardback: 978-0345544018; Paperback: 978-0804194471	
18	Speaking in Bones	2015	Hardback: 978-0434021192	2015 LibraryReads – starred review
19	The Bone Collection	2016	Hardback: 9780606394642; Paperback: 9780399593222	A short story collection including First Bones (a prequel to Déjà Dead), Bones in her Pocket, Swamp Bones and Bones on Ice. These books have been numbered as 0.5, 15.5, 16.5, 17.5, respectively.
20	A Conspiracy of Bones	2020	Hardback: 9781785151187	2020 Booklist – starred review 2020 Publishers Weekly – starred review
21	The Bone Code	July 2021	Hardback: ISBN 9781982139964 Paperback: ISBN 9781982139971	2021 LibraryReads – starred review
22	Cold, Cold Bones	July 2022	Hardback: ISBN 978-1-3985-1078-4	
23	The Bone Hacker	August 2023	Hardback: ISBN 978-1398510838	
24	Fire and Bones	August 2024	Hardback: ISBN 978-1668050927	
25	Evil Bones	November 2025	Hardback: ISBN 978-1668051474	

=== Stand-alone books ===
No.	Title	Published	ISBNs	Notes
1	Two Nights	2017	Hardback: 978-0434021116; Paperback: 978-1524755577	Stand-alone, "off-series" novel with new characters.

=== Virals series ===
This series was co-authored by Reich's son, Brendan Reichs. Tory Brennan, the great niece of Temperance Brennan, is the titular character of this series.

Title	Published	ISBN	Notes
Virals	2010	978-0099543947	
Seizure	2011	978-1595143945	
Code	2013	978-0099543855	
Exposure	2014	978-1595145307	
Terminal	2015	978-1595145284	
Trace Evidence	2016	978-1784752392	a short story collection including Shock, Shift, Swipe and Spike (a new story set after the events of Terminal).

=== Novellas ===
Reichs has released six downloadable short stories:

Title	Published	Notes
Shift	2013	Set in the Virals country, but featuring both the Virals characters and Temperance Brennan.
Bones In Her Pocket	2013	A Temperance Brennan story giving details of a case briefly mentioned in Bones of the Lost.
Swipe	2013	A Virals story, also featuring Temperance Brennan, set at Comic-Con in San Diego.
Swamp Bones	2014	A Temperance Brennan story set in the Florida Everglades.
Shock	2015	A Virals story telling how they first meet.
Bones On Ice	2015	A Temperance Brennan story of how she gets wrapped up in the ultimate cold case: a death on Mount Everest.
