= Oliver in the Garden =

2000 picture book by Margaret Beames

- Author: Margaret Beames
- Illustrator: Sue Hitchcock
- Language: English
- Subject: Children's literature, Picture book
- Published: 2000 (Scholastic)
- Publication place: New Zealand
- Media type: Print (hardback, paperback)
- Pages: 32
- ISBN: 9781869434526
- OCLC: 49221508

Oliver in the Garden (published in the USA as Night Cat) is a 2000 picture book by Margaret Beames. It is about a cat called Oliver that chooses to stay outside all night but after a number of adventures decides it is better indoors.

== Publication history ==
- Oliver in the Garden (2000), Scholastic, ISBN 9781869434526
- Night Cat (2000), Orchard Books, ISBN 9780439385763

== Reception ==
The Horn Book Magazine, in a review of Oliver in the Garden, wrote "Hitchcock's digitally rendered illustrations feature wonderfully dramatic and sometimes chilling nightscapes in a palette of deep purple and black occasionally cut by swaths of light and color. The story is more atmospheric than well-plotted, the cozy conclusion more inevitable than satisfying." A reviewer for the School Library Journal compared it to books like Marcia Brown's Shadow and concluded "this import from New Zealand promises to bewitch American picture-book readers."

Oliver in the Garden has also been reviewed by Kirkus Reviews, and Publishers Weekly.

It is one of the New Zealand Book Council 50 New Zealand books every kid should read by age 12, and won Best Picture Book and the Children's Choice Award at the 2001 New Zealand Post Book Awards for Children and Young Adults.

== Sequels ==
Beames has written further books involving Oliver including Oliver's Party (2003), and Oliver Goes Exploring (2008).
