= Temperance Brennan =

Fictional character created by author Kathy Reichs

Temperance Daessee Brennan is a fictional character created by author Kathy Reichs, and is the hero of her crime novel series (which are usually referred to as the Temperance Brennan novels). She was introduced in Reichs' first novel, Déjà Dead, which was published in 1997. All the novels are written in the first person, from Brennan's viewpoint. Like her creator, Brennan is a forensic anthropologist. In a number of novels it is indicated that Brennan's background lies in physical anthropology, rather than medicine, and throughout the novels she stresses the importance of correct crime scene process.

== Character history ==
Dr. Temperance "Tempe" /ˈtɛmpi/ Brennan is a forensic anthropologist, who investigates human remains at crime scenes where the flesh is too degraded for a coroner to obtain evidence (victims of arson, mutilation, advanced decomposition, etc.).

Brennan is a native of Chicago who grew up in the Carolinas and one of only fifty board-certified forensic anthropologists in North America. As the series unfolds the reader learns more about her past and her family connections.

Before the first novel, Brennan left her husband, Janis "Pete" Peterson, and overcame a lifelong struggle with alcoholism; as a result she usually drinks only Diet Coke, or an occasional Perrier water. She then accepted a job at the Laboratoire des Sciences Judiciaires et de Médecine Légale for the province of Quebec in Montreal, Quebec, Canada. She divides her time between teaching at the University of North Carolina in Charlotte and advising on crime scenes, and spends about half of the year in each country.

Brennan has a daughter, Katy, who initially is in college. Brennan's younger sister Harriet (known as Harry) has a son named Kit. All three have featured in significant roles in the novels. Kit's daughter Tory Brennan features in the Virals series of novels written by Kathy with her son Brendan Reichs.

Brennan's cat, Birdie, usually accompanies her on her journeys between Montreal and Charlotte. She and her sometime lover Detective Andrew Ryan share a cockatiel named Charlie who remains in Montreal, while her husband's Chow cross dog Boyd is often left with her in Charlotte.

== The Temperance Brennan novels ==
There are currently twenty-four novels in the series. Temperance Brennan also makes cameo appearances in Jasper Fforde's 2007 novel First Among Sequels and in Reichs' Virals novels.

1. Déjà Dead (1997)
2. Death du Jour (1999)
3. Deadly Decisions (2000)
4. Fatal Voyage (2001)
5. Grave Secrets (2002)
6. Bare Bones (2003)
7. Monday Mourning (2004)
8. Cross Bones (2005)
9. Break No Bones (2006)
10. Bones to Ashes (2007)
11. Devil Bones (2008)
12. 206 Bones (2009)
13. Spider Bones (2010) (Also published as Mortal Remains)
14. Flash and Bones (2011)
15. Bones are Forever (2012)
16. Bones of the Lost (2013)
17. Bones Never Lie (2014)
18. Speaking in Bones (2015)
19. A Conspiracy of Bones (2020)
20. The Bone Code (2021)
21. Cold, Cold Bones (2022)
22. The Bone Hacker (2023)
23. Fire and Bones (2024)
24. Evil Bones (2025)

Temperance Brennan also features in several short stories. Four of them (First Bones, Bones in Her Pocket, Swamp Bones, and Bones on Ice) are available published together as The Bone Collection (2016)

Title	Published	Notes
Shift	2013	A Virals story also featuring Temperance Brennan.
Bones In Her Pocket	2013	A Temperance Brennan story giving details of a case briefly mentioned in Bones of the Lost.
Swipe	2013	A Virals story, also featuring Temperance Brennan, set at San Diego Comic-Con
Swamp Bones	2014	A prequel to Bones Never Lie
Bones on Ice	2015	A Temperance Brennan story set on Mount Everest
Spike	2016	A Virals story in which Temperance Brennan attends Kit's wedding in Charleston, South Carolina.
First Bones	2016	A prequel to Déjà Dead

== Appearances in other media ==
The character shares the same name with the protagonist of the American television series Bones, whose character was not based on Reichs' books or the Brennan of her books but rather on the author herself. In the TV series, Temperance Brennan is played by Emily Deschanel. Reichs herself has stated that she sees the Temperance of the television series as a younger version of the novel Temperance. Reichs is an executive producer of the show, and oversees the forensic science aspect of the series. She also wrote the fifth season episode "The Witch in the Wardrobe", which shared some plot elements with her novel Devil Bones. On the show Temperance "Bones" Brennan writes crime novels with a fictional forensic anthropologist named Kathy Reichs as the protagonist.

Temperance Brennan also appears in the 2007 Jasper Fforde novel First Among Sequels.

Temperance Brennan also appears very briefly in the 2011 book Seizure by Kathy Reichs.

The story Faking a Murderer in the 2017 anthology MatchUp has Temperance Brennan appear in a crossover story featuring her and Jack Reacher from Lee Child's novels. The story was written as a collaboration between Kathy Reichs and Lee Child.
