= FORDISC =

FORDISC is a software program created by Stephen Ousley and Richard Jantz. It is designed to help forensic anthropologists investigate the identity of a deceased person by providing estimates of the person's size, population affinity, and biological sex based on the osteological material recovered. It has been criticised for its low accuracy.

== Features ==
FORDISC can estimate the sex, ancestry, and stature of a given skeleton via linear discriminant analysis of standard anthropometric measurements. Although created for use in forensic anthropology, many physical anthropologists are still using the program to determine the biological profile of skeletal remains that are considered archaeological in origin. However, the results acquired from such remains may be skewed, as FORDISC is primarily designed for modern populations, which may differ in some factors from historic ones. The use of discriminant function analysis in FORDISC allows the user to sort individuals into specific groups that are defined by certain criteria. The discriminate function analysis "analyzes specific groups with known membership in discrete categories such as ancestry, language, sex, tribe or ancestry, and provides a basis for the classification of new individuals with unknown group membership." FORDISC compares potential profiles to data contained in a database of skeletal measurements of modern humans.

== Databases ==
The data behind FORDISC largely originated from the Forensic Data Bank, which is contributed to by the University of Tennessee and other contributing institutions. The Forensic Data Bank was created in 1986, through the use of a National Institute of Justice grant, and has gathered over 3400 cases. The Forensic Data Bank is a currently ongoing effort to record information about modern populations, primarily from forensic cases.

FORDISC's creators have also integrated W. W. Howells worldwide cranial data into the program, for the use of archaeological remains. Howell's craniometric data set consist of 2500 crania from 28 different populations around the world dating to the later Holocene, in which around 82 cranial measurements were obtained.

== Criticism ==
According to the authors of the program, some limitations should be taken into account when using this program. Some of these limitations include the fact that if an individual's ethnic group or race is not represented in the database, the program will classify them to the 'closest' group. Another limitation involves classification using hybrid individuals and groups. The authors state that genetic exchange between groups can cause misclassifications due to gene overlap that can consist of two ancestral populations. Another limitation deal with the classification of individuals under the age of 18, this is due to the nature of physical anthropologists ability to assess age in subadults. However, the authors state that there are differences between subadults in different groups, but these differences tend to not correspond to differences seen in adults. Another limitation that the authors believe researchers should take into account is the fact that this program is based on measurements that are affected by "disease, disuse, treatment, or trauma." The measurement of affected bone(s) may produce inaccurate values, and therefore he classification will not reflect the correct population affinity.

The last limitation deals with archaeological populations. This limitation is because most of the measurements in the data set that the classifications are based on in the program are from remains that are from the 20th century, and should not be used for classification of archaeological remains. This is because documented population differences and secular changes that have occurred throughout history. However, the inclusion of W. W. Howells craniometric data set has allowed researchers to classify archaeological remains because much of the data set comes from individuals from the 19th century.

A 2009 study found that even in favourable circumstances, FORDISC 3.0 can be expected to classify no more than 1 per cent of specimens with confidence. The authors wrote, "even in favourable conditions—when the focal specimen's source population is present in the reference sample, the focal specimen is nearly complete and its sex is known—Fordisc has no more than a 1 per cent chance of success. There are several reasons for suspecting that even this may overstate Fordisc's usefulness."

In 2012 research presented at the 81st Annual Meeting of the American Association of Physical Anthropologists concluded that FORDISC ancestry determination was not always consistent, that the program does not perform to expectations and that it should be used with caution.

On a sample of Spanish skulls, FORDISC demonstrated less than 50% accuracy, classifying some skulls as Black, Japanese or American Indian.

== List of Contributing Institutions to the Forensic Anthropology Data Bank ==
- Appalachian State University
- C.A. Pound Human Identification Laboratory
- California State University, Chico
- College of Mt. Joseph
- Colorado College
- Faculty of Dentistry, University of São Paulo
- Hamilton County Medical Examiner's Office, Chattanooga, Tennessee
- Hamline University
- Honolulu Medical Examiner's Office
- Louisiana State University
- Lucas County Coroner's Office
- Mercyhurst Archaeological Institute
- Monterey County Sheriff's Department
- New Jersey State Police, Criminal Investigation Bureau
- North Dakota Medical Examiner
- North Carolina Medical Examiners Office, Chapel Hill
- Office of the Medical Examiner, Nashville, Tennessee
- Regional Forensic Center, Memphis, Tennessee
- Smithsonian Institution
- Southwest Texas State University
- Texas Tech University
- U.L.M.
- U.S. Army Central Identification Laboratory
- University of Alabama
- University of Arizona
- University of Arkansas, Fayetteville
- University of California, Santa Cruz
- University of Hawaii
- University of Indianapolis
- University of New Mexico
- University of South Carolina
- University of South Florida
- University of Utah
- University of Wyoming
- Western Michigan University
- Wichita State University

== See also ==
- Forensic anthropology
- Biological anthropology
- Bioarchaeology
- Cranid
- Osteoware
