= Donna House =

Donna House (born c. 1953/1954) is a Navajo Nation ethnobotanist and a contributing designer of the National Museum of the American Indian.

House was born in Washington, D.C., where her father was a guard at The Pentagon, and grew up on the Navajo Nation Reservation at Oak Springs and later Fort Defiance, Arizona. She states that she is "of the Towering House People Clan of the Diné and Turtle Clan of the Oneida". House was born into a family of nine children and raised by traditional Navajo values. She went to the University of Utah and became the first person from Oak Springs to graduate from university. House initially read molecular biology and wanted to become a doctor, however she then changed major to environmental science to investigate the relationships between people and the land around them. She is a citizen of the Navajo Nation.

In the summer of 1984 The Nature Conservancy (TNC) Science Division signed a contract with the Navajo Nation to create the Navajo Natural Heritage Program, to hire, train and supervise staff for several years until the Nation's Division of Fish and Wildlife could incorporate it in its budget. The program became part of the national network TNC's Science Division was creating. Donna was hired as the initial head of the program and also its botanist. Her eight years of botanical work involved data gathering and seeking to protect native plants, especially those which were endangered but of importance to the tradition of indigenous people. This included efforts to find habitats of Kearney's blue star, one of the rarest flowers in Arizona, located on lands of the Tohono Oʼodham.

For eleven years House was on the planning committee at the Smithsonian Institution for the construction of the National Museum of the American Indian. She represented her native nations, alongside colleagues from other tribes including Douglas Cardinal, Johnpaul Jones, Ramona Sakiestewa and Lou Weller. Her main contributions to the project included positioning the building entrance to face away from the main road and towards the East to align with the movement of the sun and elements of the solar calendar. Additionally House found and cultivated 189 native plant genera for the gardens surrounding the museum, arranged to represent four microcosms representing old habitats of the area; upland hardwood forest, eastern meadowlands, traditional croplands and lowland freshwater wetlands (a homage to Tiber Creek which runs beneath the site). All the land and seeds used were blessed before being incorporated into the construction.
