= National Museum of the American Indian Act =

1989 United States law

- Long title: National Museum of the American Indian Act
- Acronyms (colloquial): NMAI
- Enacted by: the 101st United States Congress

Citations
- Public law: Pub. L. 101–185

Legislative history
- Introduced in the Senate by Daniel Inouye (D-Hawaii) on May 11, 1989; Committee consideration by United States Senate Committee on Rules, United States Senate Committee on Indian Affairs; Passed the Senate on October 3, 1989 (voice vote); Passed the House as the H.R. 2668. House struck all of the Senate bill after the enacting clause and inserted in lieu thereof the provisions of H.R. 2668 on October 13, 1989 (without objection) with amendment; Senate agreed to House amendment on October 14, 1989 (voice vote); Signed into law by President George H. W. Bush on November 28, 1989

Major amendments
- National Museum of the American Indian Act Amendments of 1996, Pub. L. 104-278, October 9, 1996

The National Museum of the American Indian Act (NMAI Act) was enacted on November 28, 1989, as Public Law 101-185. The law established the National Museum of the American Indian as part of the Smithsonian Institution. The law also required the Secretary of the Smithsonian to prepare an inventory of all Indian and Native Hawaiian human remains and funerary objects in Smithsonian collections, as well as expeditiously return these items upon the request of culturally affiliated federally recognized Indian tribes and Native Hawaiian organizations.

== The Smithsonian Institution ==
The NMAI Act expands the Smithsonian Institution by authorizing erection of a new museum on the National Mall in Washington, D.C., to house Native American artifacts from the Heye Foundation's Museum of the American Indian. As part of a legal compromise regarding the Heye Foundation's New York state charter, the George Gustav Heye Center of the National Museum of the American Indian was also created by the NMAI Act in the Alexander Hamilton U.S. Custom House in New York City.

The purpose of the NMAI is threefold:

- To advance the study of Native Americans
- To collect, preserve, and exhibit Native American objects
- To provide for Native American research and study programs

== Inventory and return ==
Prior to enactment of the NMAI Act, representatives of the Native American Rights Fund and the Association for Native American Affairs told Congressional staffers that they would oppose the bill if repatriation provisions were not included. At an August 1989, meeting in Santa Fe, New Mexico, Secretary of the Smithsonian Robert McCormick Adams, Jr., agreed that the Smithsonian would abide by new repatriation provisions. As a result of the law, the Secretary of the Smithsonian is required to inventory Indian and Native Hawaiian human remains and funerary objects in the possession or control of the Smithsonian Institution and return them upon request by a descendant or culturally affiliated Indian tribe or Native Hawaiian organization. These items are housed primarily in the National Museum of Natural History, National Museum of the American Indian, and National Museum of American History.

The Smithsonian had amassed a huge collection of Native American items including:

- 4,000 Native American remains collected under an 1867 order by the Surgeon General of the United States Army to Army medical officers to send skeletal remains of Native Americans to the Army Medical Museum. These remains were transferred to the Smithsonian Institution beginning in 1898.
- Another 14,000 Native American remains were obtained through archaeological excavations, individual donations, and museum donations.
- The acquisition of the Heye Foundation's collections added 800,000 artifacts to the Smithsonian's Native American collections.

== Return criteria ==
The 1989 NMAI Act applied only to the return of Indian and Native Hawaiian human remains and funerary objects. The NMAI Act was amended in 1996 to include additional categories derived from the Native American Graves Protection and Repatriation Act enacted in 1990, with similar definitions:

- Human remains
- Associated funerary objects
- Unassociated funerary objects
- Sacred objects
- Objects of cultural patrimony

The 1996 amendment also established specific deadlines for the Smithsonian to complete its summary and inventory tasks. The National Museum of Natural History posted summaries of its cultural affiliation case reports on its website. By 2007, the remains of 18,568 individuals had been identified. Of these, remains representing 5,435 individuals (29%) had been offered for repatriation to lineal descendants or culturally affiliated Indian tribes or Native Hawaiian organizations. By 1996, the National Museum of the American Indian had identified the remains of 524 individuals in its collection, of which 227 (41%) had already been repatriated.

== GAO Report on Repatriation ==
In 2011, the Government Accountability Office (GAO) completed a study of the extent to which the Smithsonian had fulfilled the repatriation requirements of the NMAI Act. The GAO found that while the Smithsonian had inventoried, identified, and returned thousands of Indian human remains, at the current pace it may take decades more for it to complete the process. The GAO suggested that Congress consider ways to expedite the process including, but not limited to, directing the Smithsonian to make cultural affiliation determinations as efficiently and effectively as possible. The GAO also recommended certain administrative changes to enhance oversight of the process.

== See also ==
- Osteoware
- NAGPRA
- Smithsonian Museum of Natural History
- National Museum of the American Indian
