= Osteoware =

Osteoware is a free data recording software for human skeletal material that is managed through the Smithsonian Museum of Natural History. It is used by biological anthropologists to document data relevant to research and forensic applications of human skeletal remains in a standardized and consistent way. It has influenced other skeletal recording software, and has been successfully used at the Smithsonian for collecting data relevant to biological anthropology. Osteoware is the only free, individual-use software for the collection of data on skeletal material in anthropology.

== Uses ==
When analyzing a skeletal population or individual—ranging from metric analyses to taphonomic and pathological analyses—the biological anthropologist collects various data. Osteoware is beneficial in that it organizes the range of data collected into a universal format, which is of further use to anthropologists when they need to interpret their data. If, for instance, the focus of the anthropologist's research is the dentition of the remains, Osteoware has an inventory for both deciduous and permanent (or adult) dentition. Osteoware is also particularly useful for archaeological sites or disaster sites that have commingled remains. One major challenge with commingled remains is how to document and organize the data associated with the commingling. Osteoware has two primary features that remedy this difficulty. On the home page, there is a button to add individuals associated with the main individual whose data are being collected; and there is another button that is useful when there is no main individual in the commingling or when one is unable to associate other remains with a specified individual.

== Software features ==
Within the program, there are twelve modules where one can manually insert qualitative or quantitative data. These sections include the following: Skeletal Inventory, Pathology, Taphonomy, Dental Morphology and Inventory, Age and Sex, Cranial and Postcranial Metrics, Cranial Nonmetrics, Macromorphoscopics, and Cranial Deformations. The module buttons are color-coded in relation to the status of the data, for example, the button is yellow if data is required and purple when it has been provided. Integrating photographs, X-ray data, and commingled bone documentation is also possible with this software through four special function buttons.

Regarding the radiographic and X-ray data, Osteoware provides a "Pending" option prior to the completion of these kind of data. Whenever the data entry is complete within Osteoware, a module for the Summary Paragraph is provided. This provides an opportunity to provide additional information, as well as summarize the data collected. To make this module easier, Osteoware has a function where comments from other modules can be inserted within the Summary Paragraph. The software is primarily Windows compatible, but users of Mac OS 10.5 and higher can use it if they install BootCamp — software that enables switching between Windows and Mac environments. It is also possible to extract data from Osteoware because it operates with a 'relational database,' SQL.

== Members ==
The Osteoware project team has in the past consisted of (in alphabetical order): Kathleen Aida, formerly of the Repatriation Osteology Laboratory; Chris Dudar, director of the Repatriation Office Osteology Laboratory; Joseph Hefner from Michigan State University; Erica Jones, of the Repatriation Osteology Laboratory; Gwyn Madden, from the Department of Anthropology, Grand Valley State University; Dawn Mulhern from the Department of Anthropology, Fort Lewis College; Claire O'Brien, formerly of the Repatriation Osteology Laboratory; Steve Ousley from the Department of Anthropology, Mercyhurst College; and Cynthia Wilczak from the Department of Anthropology San Francisco State University.

== History ==
After the Native American Graves Protection and Repatriation Act (NAGPRA) was passed as a federal law in 1990, efforts were made in the field of biological anthropology to provide better documentation of skeletal remains. The Smithsonian does not fall under NAGPRA, but falls under the National Museum of the American Indian Act (NMAIA). Prior to the passing of NAGPRA, the NMAIA was passed by the U.S. Congress in 1989. This act is similar to NAGPRA, in that it requires the repatriation of Native American skeletal remains and spiritually significant artifacts to the Tribes to which they belong. Osteoware grew out of these efforts. After Buikstra and Ubelaker's Standards for Data Collection from Human Skeletal Remains was published and began to be used by biological anthropologists as a field and data collection manual, the Smithsonian deemed it necessary to create a digital data entry system that was modeled after the work of these authors.

== Criticism ==
Beside the buttons for adding individuals and for commingled inventories, one can use the database tracking system for commingled skeletal elements. This system is useful for keeping track of commingled remains during data collection and for future efforts at reassociation. The type of method and the time to use it when documenting commingled remains is not decided by the software, but by the individual entering the data. It is, therefore, difficult to discern when to identify which feature to use. Osteoware also does not provide an option for 'Unknown' for the siding of a bone and it also does not incorporate provenience. Cargill, Grant, Oubre, and Danforth suggest that these two options would be beneficial additions to Osteoware. The Smithsonian has created a forum where users can offer criticisms and potential suggestions to improve Osteoware as a data collection tool. Currently, Osteoware is expanding its Taphonomy module to include the documentation of peri- and post-mortem cut marks as well as partial versus complete cremation. Osteoware is also expanding beyond the framework of Buikstra and Ubelaker's Standards for Data Collection from Human Skeletal Remains to include Postcranial Nonmetric Traits.

== See also ==
- FORDISC
- NAGPRA
- Jane Buikstra
- Douglas Ubelaker
- Forensic Anthropology
- Bioarchaeology
- CranID
