= National Museum of the American Indian =

Museum in Washington, DC, United States

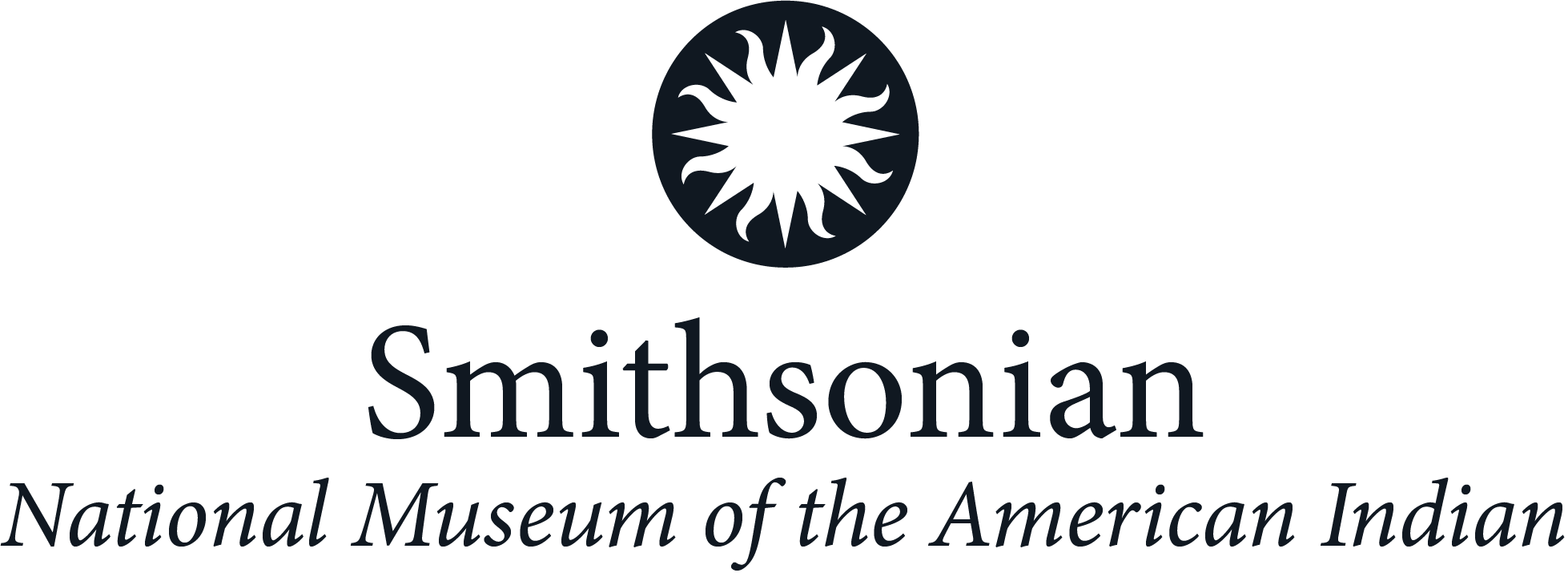

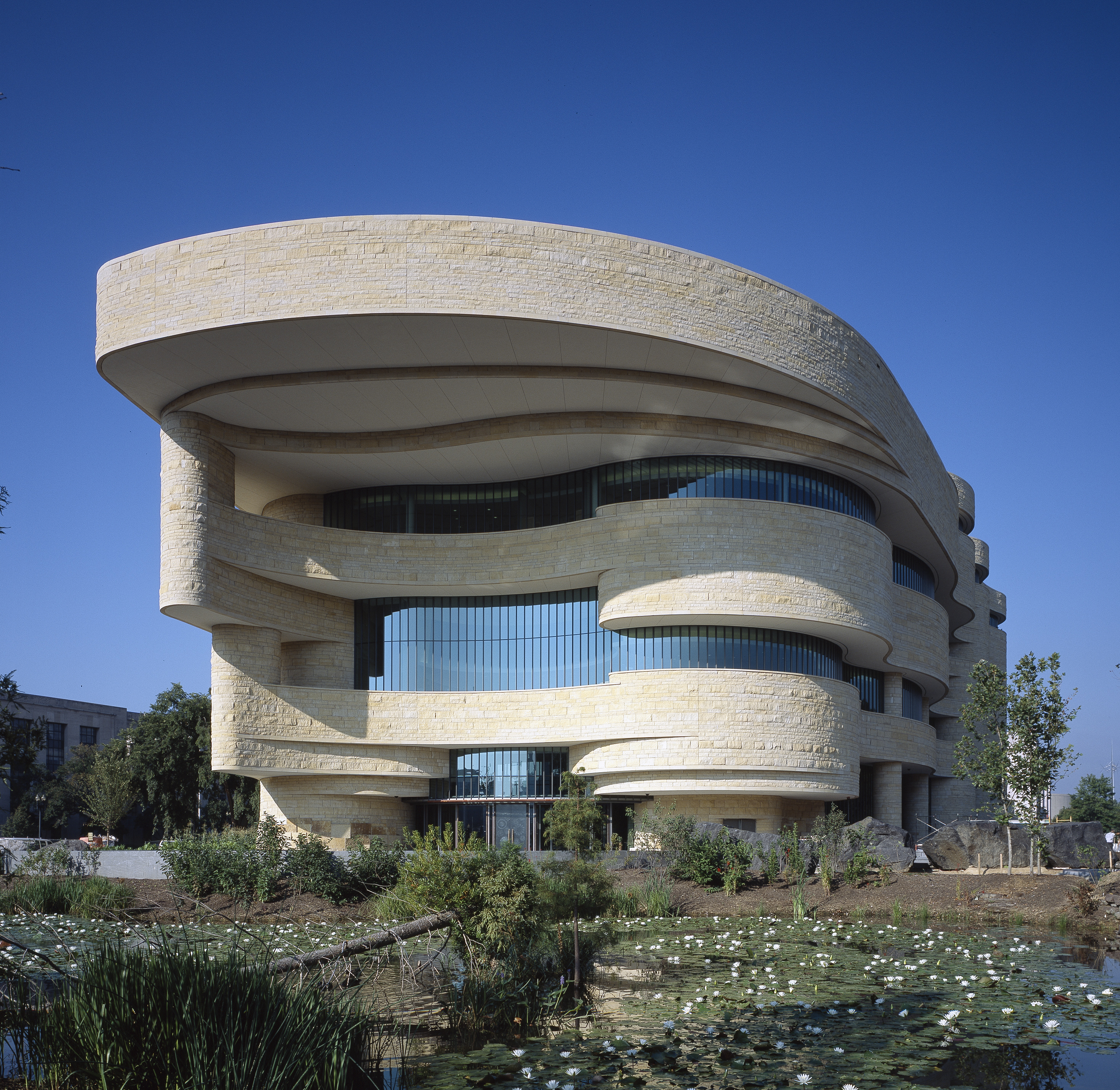
- Established: 1989
- Location: Fourth Street and Independence Avenue, Southwest, Washington D.C. (main location)
- Coordinates: 38.8883°N 77.0166°W
- Visitors: 701,021 (2023)
- Director: Cynthia Chavez Lamar
- Public transit access: Federal Center SW (main location)
- Website: www.americanindian.si.edu

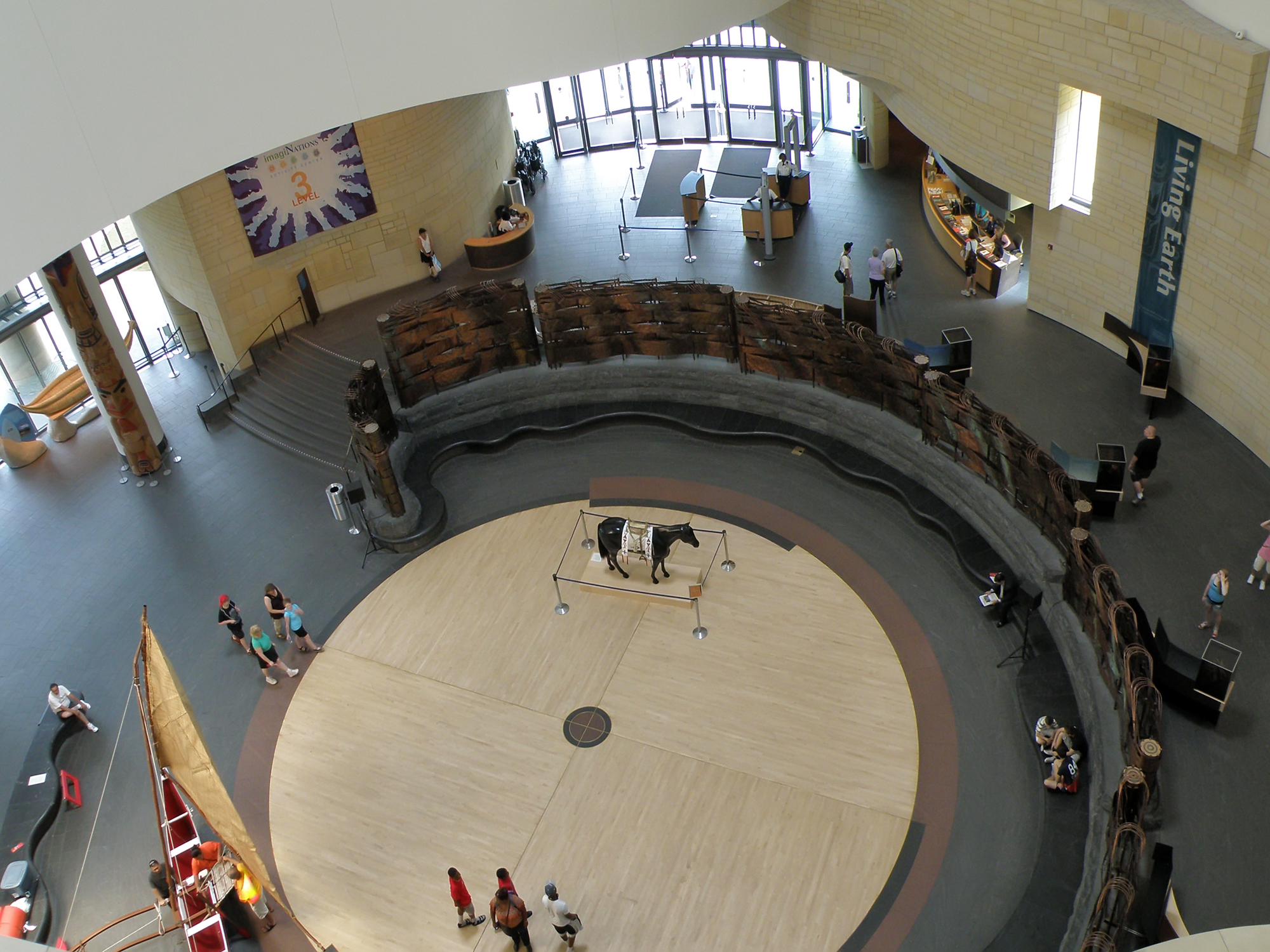
Interior of the museum, 2015.

The National Museum of the American Indian is a museum in the United States devoted to the culture of the Indigenous peoples of the Americas. It is part of the Smithsonian Institution group of museums and research centers.

The museum has three facilities. The National Museum of the American Indian on the National Mall in Washington, D.C., opened on September 21, 2004, on Fourth Street and Independence Avenue, Southwest. The George Gustav Heye Center, a permanent museum, is located at the Alexander Hamilton U.S. Custom House in New York City, opened in October 1994. The Cultural Resources Center, a research and collections facility, is located in Suitland, Maryland. The foundations for the present collections were first assembled in the former Museum of the American Indian in New York City, which was established in 1916, and which became part of the Smithsonian in 1989.

== History ==
Fundraising and advocacy for the creation of what would eventually become the National Museum of the American Indian launched in 1982 at the Kennedy Center's Night of the First Americans event. In conjunction with this star-studded gala, Retha Walden Gambaro organized an exhibition featuring 120 Native American artists. Gambaro was president of the Amerindian Circle of the Smithsonian Institution, an artist in her own right, co-owner of the first gallery in the U.S. capital dedicated to Native American artists, and an early champion for the creation of a national museum dedicated to Native American art and culture.

Following controversy over the discovery by Indian leaders that the Smithsonian Institution held more than 12,000–18,000 human remains, mostly in storage, United States senator Daniel Inouye introduced in 1989 the National Museum of the American Indian Act. Passed as Public Law 101-185, it established the National Museum of the American Indian as "a living memorial to Native Americans and their traditions". The Act also required that human remains, funerary objects, sacred objects, and objects of cultural patrimony be considered for repatriation to tribal communities, as well as objects acquired illegally. Since 1989 the Smithsonian has repatriated over 5,000 individual remains – about 1/3 of the total estimated human remains in its collection.

On September 21, 2004, for the inauguration of the Museum, Senator Inouye addressed an audience of around 20,000 American Indians, Alaska Natives, and Native Hawaiians, which was the largest gathering in Washington D.C. of Indigenous people to its time.

The creation of the museum brought together the collections of the George Gustav Heye Center in New York City, founded in 1922, and the Smithsonian Institution. The Heye collection became part of the Smithsonian in June 1990, and represents approximately 85% of the holdings of the NMAI. The Heye Collection was formerly displayed at Audubon Terrace in Uptown Manhattan, but had long been seeking a new building.

The Museum of the American Indian considered options of merging with the Museum of Natural History, accepting a large donation from Ross Perot to be housed in a new museum building to be built in Dallas, or moving to the U.S. Customs House. The Heye Trust included a restriction requiring the collection to be displayed in New York City, and moving the collection to a Museum outside of New York aroused substantial opposition from New York politicians. The current arrangement represented a political compromise between those who wished to keep the Heye Collection in New York, and those who wanted it to be part of the new NMAI in Washington, DC. The NMAI was initially housed in lower Manhattan at the Alexander Hamilton U.S. Custom House, which was refurbished for this purpose and remains an exhibition site; its building on the Mall in Washington, DC opened on September 21, 2004.

=== Directors ===
In January 2022, the Smithsonian announced that Cynthia Chavez Lamar, an employee since 2014, would take over as director of NMAI on February 14. Her position will also oversee the George Gustav Heye Center in Lower Manhattan and the Cultural Resources Center in Suitland, Maryland. As an enrolled member at San Felipe Pueblo, she will be the first Native American woman to serve as a Smithsonian museum director. Previously, she was NMAI's acting associate director for collections and operations, and had also interned at the museum in 1994, and worked there as an associate curator from 2000 to 2005.

Before Chavez Lamar, Machel Monenerkit had been the Acting Director, taking the position in January 2021. As of 2023, Greg Sarris serves as the Chairman of the Board of Trustees for the Smithsonian Institution's National Museum of the American Indian.

Kevin Gover was the director of the Smithsonian Institution's National Museum of the American Indian beginning December 2007 until January 2021. He is currently the Under Secretary for Museums and Culture at the Smithsonian. He is a former professor of law at the Sandra Day O'Connor College of Law at Arizona State University in Tempe, an affiliate professor in its American Indian Studies Program and co-executive director of the university's American Indian Policy Institute. Gover, 52, grew up in Oklahoma and is a member of the Pawnee Nation of Oklahoma and of Comanche descent. He received his bachelor's degree in public and international affairs from Princeton University and his J.D. degree from the University of New Mexico School of Law. He was awarded an honorary doctor of laws degree from Princeton University in 2001.

Gover succeeded W. Richard West Jr. (Southern Cheyenne), who was the founding director of the National Museum of the American Indian (1990–2007).

West was strongly criticized in 2007 for having spent $250,000 on travel in four years and being away from the museum frequently on overseas travel. This was official travel funded by the Smithsonian, and many within the Native American community offered defenses of West and his tenure.

== Locations ==
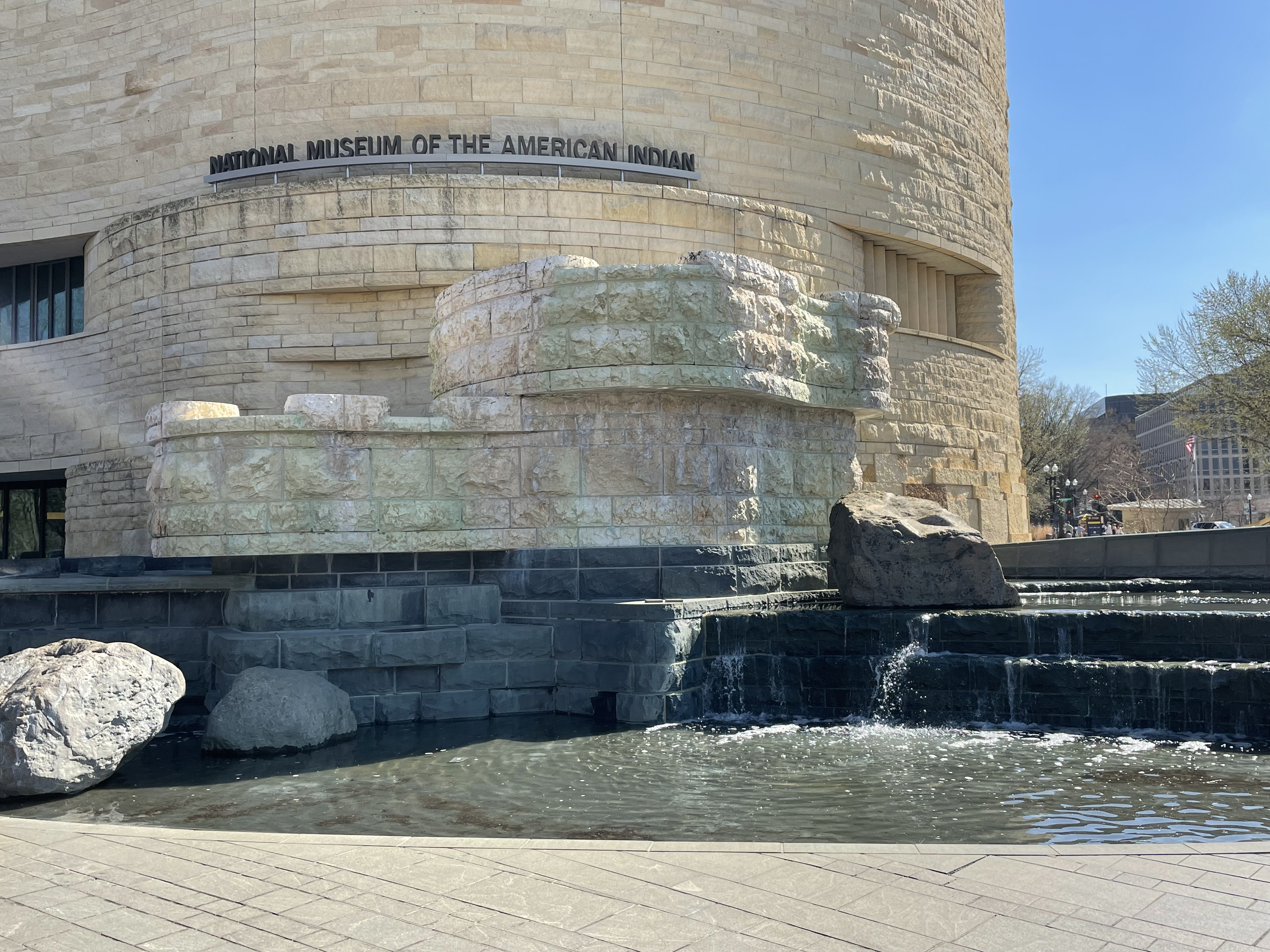
Waterfall outside the Museum representing Tiber Creek

The museum of American Indian has three branches: National Museum of the American Indian in the National Mall (Washington, D.C.), George Gustav Heye Center in New York City, and the Cultural Resources Center in Maryland. The National Native Americans Veterans Memorial is also located near the museum.

=== National Mall (Washington, D.C.) ===
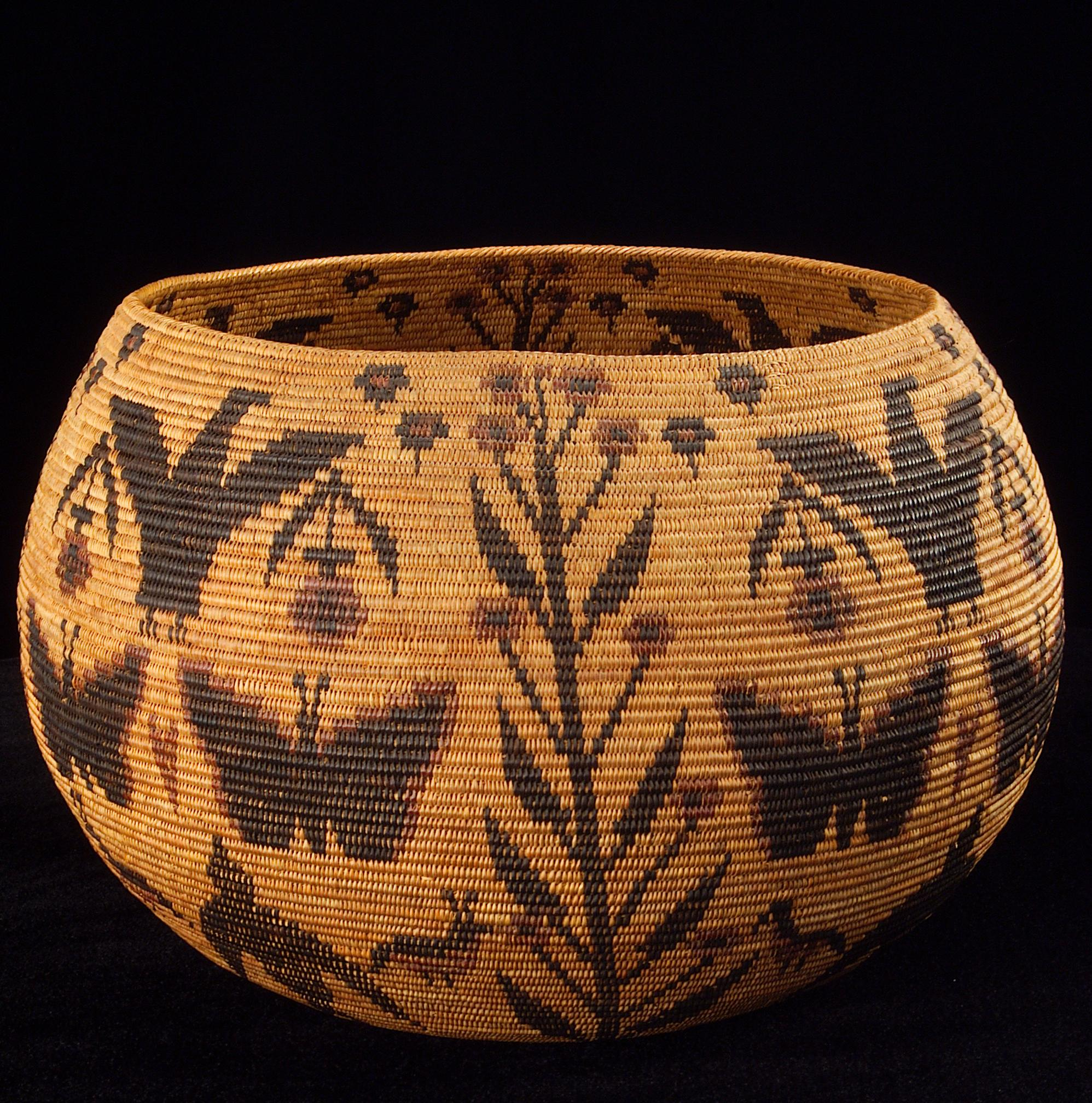
Basket woven by Miwok-Mono Paiute artist Lucy Telles

The groundbreaking ceremony for the National Museum of the American Indian on the National Mall was held on September 28, 1999. The museum opened on September 21, 2004.

Fifteen years in the making, it was the first national museum in the country dedicated exclusively to Native Americans. The five-story, 250,000-square-foot (23,000 m^{2}), curvilinear building is clad in a golden-colored Kasota limestone designed to evoke natural rock formations shaped by wind and water over thousands of years.

The museum is set in a 4.25 acres (17,200 m^{2})-site and is surrounded by simulated wetlands. The museum's east-facing entrance, its prism window and its 120-foot (37 m) high space for contemporary Native performances are direct results of extensive consultations with Native peoples. Similar to the Heye Center in Lower Manhattan, the museum offers a range of exhibitions, film and video screenings, school group programs, public programs and living culture presentations throughout the year.

The museum's architect and project designer is Canadian Douglas Cardinal (Blackfoot); its design architects are GBQC Architects of Philadelphia and architect Johnpaul Jones (Cherokee/Choctaw). Disagreements during construction led to Cardinal's being removed from the project, but the building retains his original design intent. He provided continued input during the museum's construction. The structural engineering firm chosen for this project was Severud Associates.

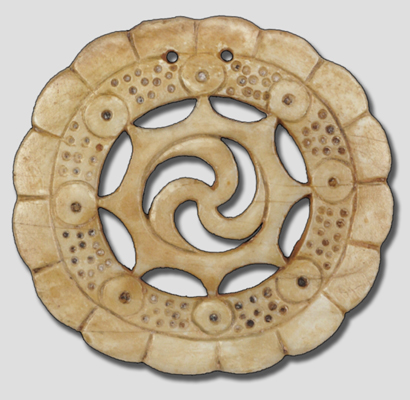
Shell gorget from Castalian Springs Mound Site, made around 1200-1325 AD

The museum's project architects are Jones & Jones Architects and Landscape Architects Ltd. of Seattle and SmithGroup of Washington, D.C., in association with Lou Weller (Caddo), the Native American Design Collaborative, and Polshek Partnership Architects of New York City; Ramona Sakiestewa (Hopi) and Donna House (Navajo/Oneida) also served as design consultants. The landscape architects are Jones & Jones Architects and Landscape Architects Ltd. of Seattle and EDAW, Inc., of Alexandria, Virginia.

In general, Native Americans have filled the leadership roles in the design and operation of the museum and have aimed at creating a different atmosphere and experience from museums of European and Euro-American culture. Donna E. House, the Navajo and Oneida botanist who supervised the landscaping, has said, "The landscape flows into the building, and the environment is who we are. We are the trees, we are the rocks, we are the water. And that had to be part of the museum." This theme of organic flow is reflected by the interior of the museum, whose walls are mostly curving surfaces, with almost no sharp corners.

==== Mitsitam Native Foods Cafe ====
The Mitsitam Native Foods Cafe has five stations serving different regional foods: Northern Woodlands, South America, the Northwest Coast, Meso-America, and the Great Plains. Mitsitam's first Executive Chef was the Diné chef Freddie Bitsoie. The museum has published a Mitisam Cafe Cookbook.

=== George Gustav Heye Center (New York City) ===
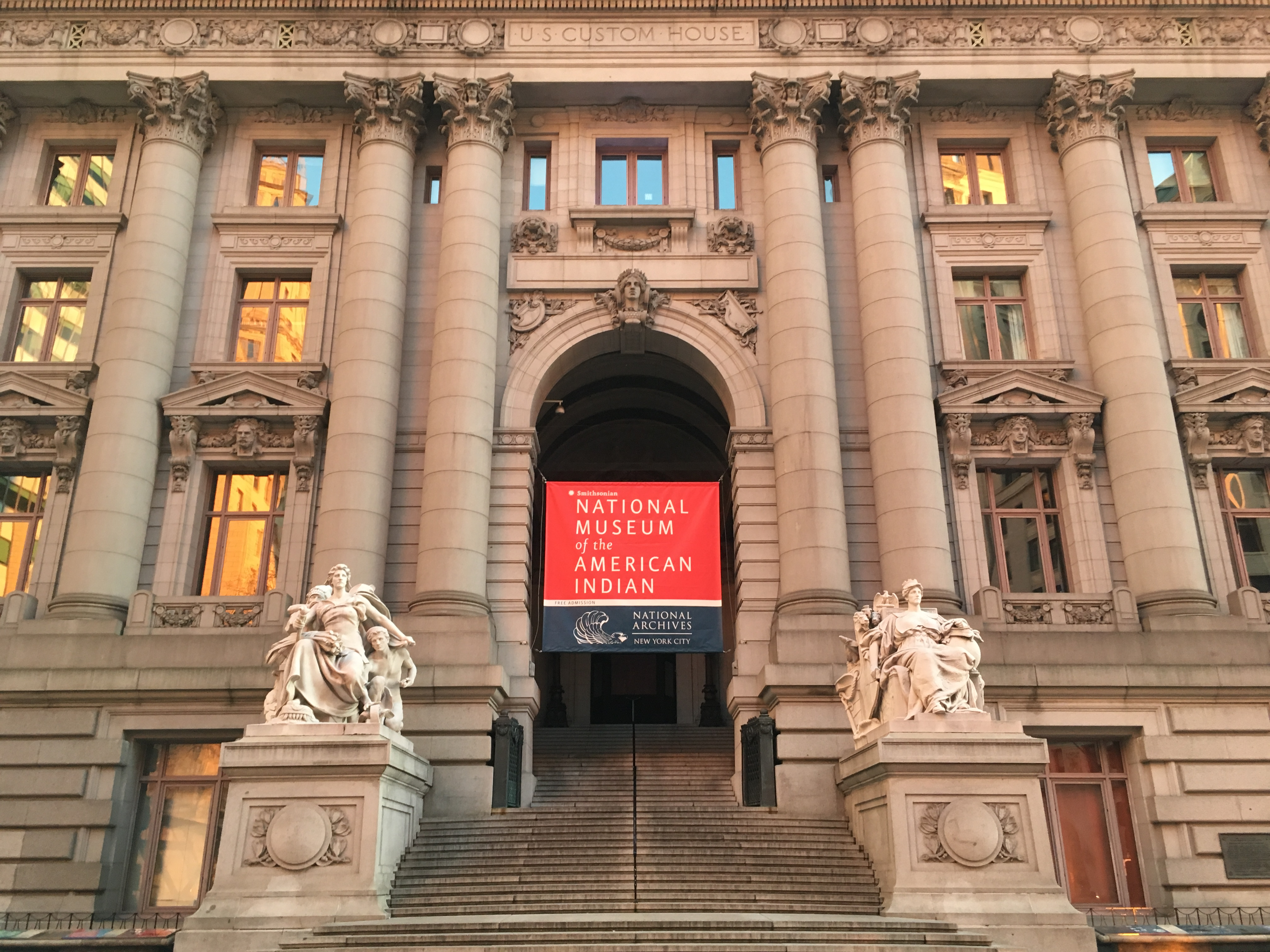
The Alexander Hamilton U.S. Custom House, site of the George Gustav Heye Center

George Gustav Heye (1874–1957) traveled throughout North and South America collecting native objects. His collection was assembled over 54 years, beginning in 1903. He started the Museum of the American Indian and his Heye Foundation in 1916. The Heye Foundation's Museum of the American Indian opened to the public on Audubon Terrace in New York City in 1922.

The museum at Audubon Terrace closed in 1994 and part of the collection is now housed at The Museum's George Gustav Heye Center, that occupies two floors of the Alexander Hamilton U.S. Custom House in Lower Manhattan. The Beaux Arts-style building, designed by architect Cass Gilbert, was completed in 1907. It is a designated National Historic Landmark and a New York City landmark. The center's exhibition and public access areas total about 20,000 square feet (2,000 m^{2}). The Heye Center offers a range of exhibitions, film and video screenings, school group programs and living culture presentations throughout the year.

=== Cultural Resources Center (Maryland) ===
In Suitland, Maryland, the National Museum of the American Indian operates the Cultural Resources Center, an enormous, nautilus-shaped building which houses the collection, a library, and the photo archives. The Cultural Resources Center opened in 2003.

=== National Native American Veterans Memorial ===
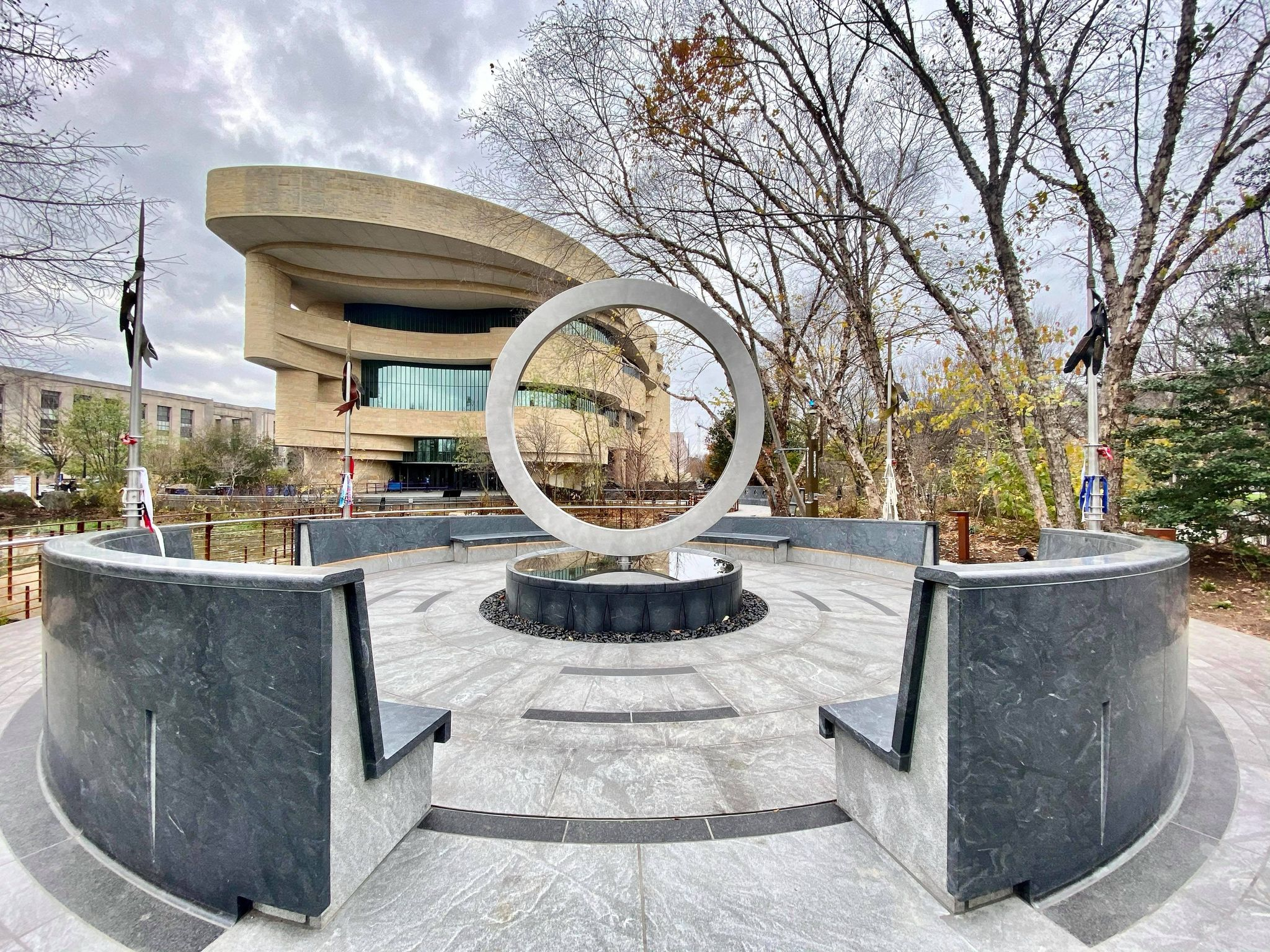
National Native American Veterans Memorial

The National Native American Veterans Memorial honors American Indian, Alaska Native, and Native Hawaiian veterans who have served in the U.S. Armed Forces during every American conflict since the American Revolution. It was originally authorized by Congress in 1994 with amendments in 2013.

The national memorial was unveiled with a virtual event on Veterans Day 2020, with a dedication ceremony postponed due to the COVID-19 pandemic in the United States. The ceremony was held on November 11, 2022, and included a procession of more than 1,500 Native veterans from more than 120 Native nations. The memorial comprises a vertical steel circle standing on a stone drum, surrounded by benches and engravings of the logos of the military branches. Four stainless steel lances are incorporated around the benches where veterans, family members, tribal leaders, and other visitors can tie cloths for prayers and healing.

The memorial was designed by Cheyenne and Arapaho artist Harvey Pratt and is titled Warriors' Circle of Honor. Jurors unanimously selected the design concept from among more than 120 submissions.

== Collection history ==
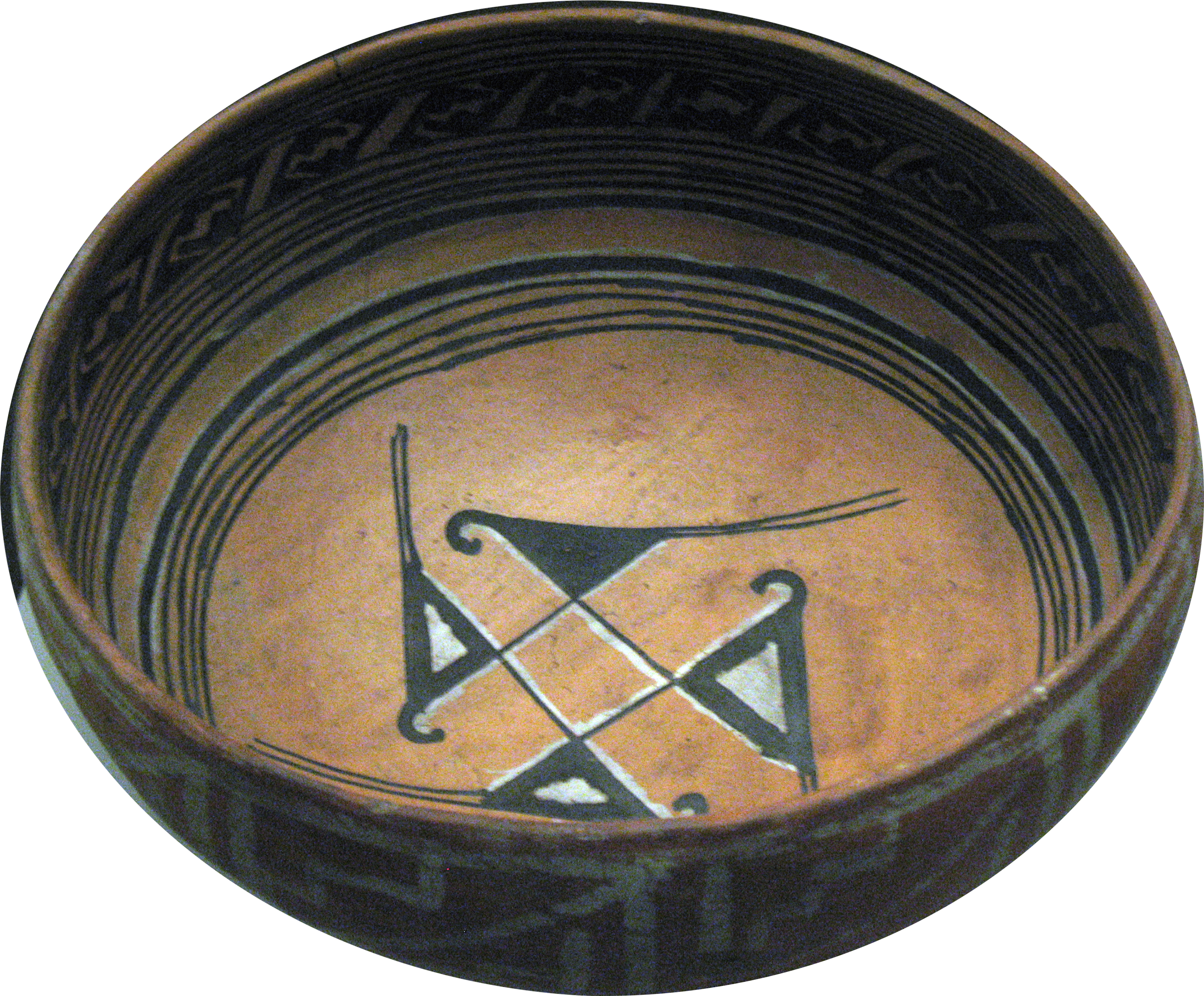
Ancestral Hopi bowl, 1300s, Homolovi, Arizona

The National Museum of the American Indian is home to the collection of the former Museum of the American Indian, Heye Foundation. The collection includes more than 800,000 objects, as well as a photographic archive of 125,000 images. It is divided into the following areas: Amazon; Andes; Arctic/Subarctic; California/Great Basin; Contemporary Art; Mesoamerican/Caribbean; Northwest Coast; Patagonia; Plains/Plateau; Woodlands.

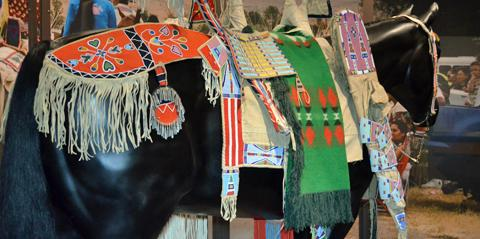
Representation of Crow horse regalia, ca. 1880s with cradleboard on exhibit at NMAI

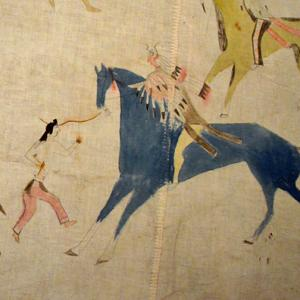
Scenes of battle and horse raiding decorate a muslin Lakota tipi from the late 19th or early 20th century

The collection, which became part of the Smithsonian in June 1990, was assembled by George Gustav Heye (1874–1957) during a 54-year period, beginning in 1903. He traveled throughout North and South America collecting Native objects. Heye used his collection to found New York's Museum of the American Indian, Heye Foundation and directed it until his death in 1957. The Heye Foundation's Museum of the American Indian opened to the public in New York City in 1922.

The collection is not subject to the Native American Graves Protection and Repatriation Act. When the National Museum was created in 1989, a law governing repatriation was drafted specifically for the museum, the National Museum of the American Indian Act, upon which NAGPRA was modeled. In addition to repatriation, the museum engages in dialogues with tribal communities regarding the appropriate curation of cultural heritage items. For example, the human remains vault is smudged once a week with tobacco, sage, sweetgrass, and cedar, and sacred Crow objects in the Plains vault are smudged with sage during the full moon. If the appropriate cultural tradition for curating an object is unknown, the Native staff uses their own cultural knowledge and customs to treat materials as respectfully as possible.

The museum has programs in which Native American scholars and artists can view NMAI's collections to enhance their own research and artwork.

== Exhibits ==
=== Nation to Nation: Treaties ===
In 2014 NMAI opened a new exhibition Nation to Nation: Treaties, curated by Indian rights activist Suzan Shown Harjo. The exhibit is built around the Two Row Wampum Treaty, known from both Indian oral tradition and a written document that some believe is a modern forgery. Museum reviewer Diana Muir Appelbaum has said, "There is no evidence that there ever was a 1613 treaty" and describes NMAI as "a museum that peddles fairy tales."

== American Indian magazine ==
American Indian
- Editor-in-Chief: Tanya Thrasher
- Frequency: quarterly
- Circulation: 32,889
- Publisher: Smithsonian Institution
- First issue: 2000
- Country: US
- Website: https://www.americanindianmagazine.org/
- ISSN: 1528-0640
- OCLC: 43245983

The museum publishes a quarterly magazine, called the American Indian, which focuses on a wide range of topics pertaining to Indigenous peoples throughout the Western Hemisphere. It won the Native American Journalists Association's General Excellence awards in 2002 and 2003.

== Reception ==
The National Museum of the American Indian's Indigenous-focused curatorial strategy has been criticized by visitors expecting to see the same depictions that traditional museums present. Two Washington Post writers, Fisher and Richard, expressed "irritation and frustration at the cognitive dissonance they experienced once inside the museum". For Fisher, the displays did not meet his expectations that they would tell the familiar story of Indians' evolution from prehistory to modern times. Richards, who had a similarly negative assessment of the NMAI, questioned whether the broad array of Indian identities and individuals depicted in the exhibit really qualified as Indians.

Jacki Thompson Rand, a Choctaw historian who served on the advisory board up to 1994, titled her reflections Why I Can't Visit the National Museum of the American Indian: "The absence of Native knowledge and the consequent inability to effect the required translation undermined exhibitions … Art and material culture were the preferred media for transferring knowledge about Native America to an unknowing audience. Why art and culture? … This meant, astonishingly, no treatment of the history of genocide and colonialism, then and now, or even of the basis of tribal sovereignty."

Edward Rothstein described the NMAI as an "identity museum" that "jettisons Western scholarship and tells its own story, leading one tribe to solemnly describe its earliest historical milestone: "Birds teach people to call for rain".

The museum had 2.4 million visitors in the year it opened. In 2014 it averaged 1.4 million visitors.

== See also ==
- List of most-visited museums in the United States
- Always Becoming
- Ben Nighthorse Campbell
- Daniel Inouye
- George Gustav Heye Center
- List of national memorials of the United States
- National Museum of the American Indian Act
