= Bone Clones =

Bone Clones, Inc.
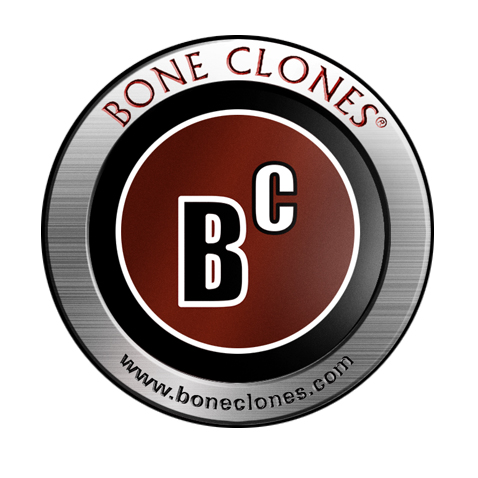
- Company type: Private Corporation
- Industry: Manufacturing, distribution, retail
- Headquarters: Chatsworth, California, U.S.
- Area served: Worldwide
- Products: Natural human and animal bone reproductions

Bone Clones, Inc. manufactures, distributes, and sells osteological reproductions of human and animal bones. Located in Chatsworth, California, Bone Clones provides these reproductions to museums, universities, medical schools, and other educational institutions.

== History ==
Bone Clones creator Dave Kronen became interested in animals during his career as an artist. During the 1980s, he began processing animals in his Woodland Hills studio, carefully and painstakingly mounting the skeletons of lizards, snakes, and other animals. With a supply of animal remains from local zoos, museums began to buy the processed skeletons from Kronen. The idea of replicating real bones out of resin casting came from the increasing demand of museums for processed skeletons. The manufacturing of Bone Clones reproductions began in 1993.

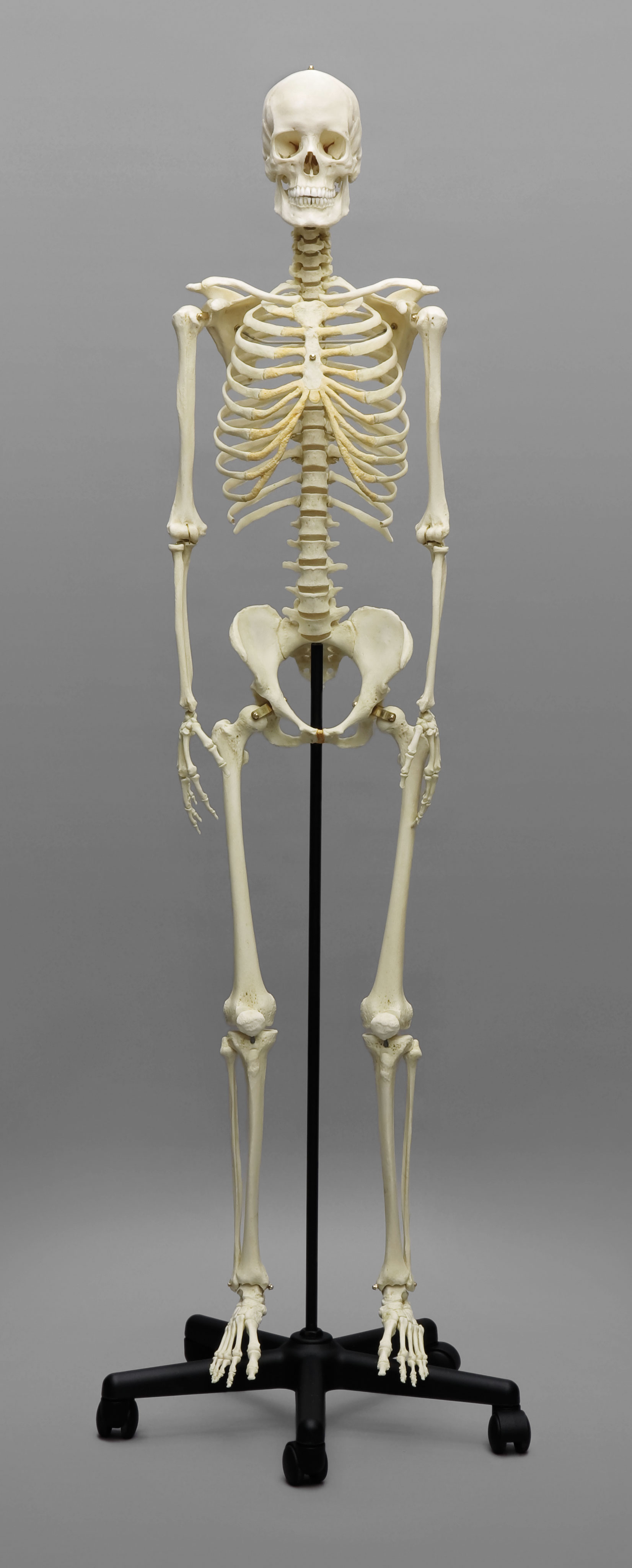
European human female skeleton

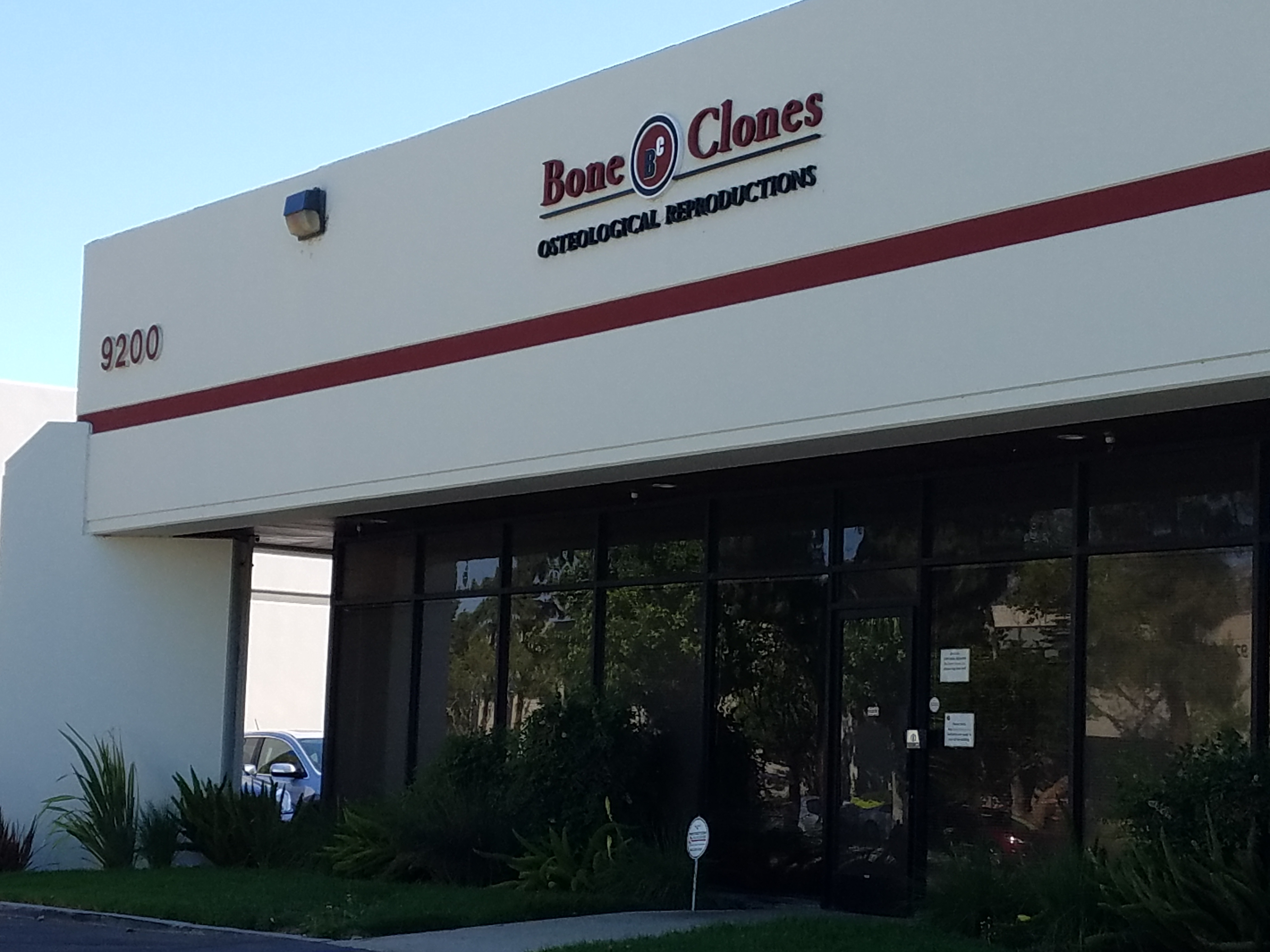
Bone Clones facility in Chatsworth, California

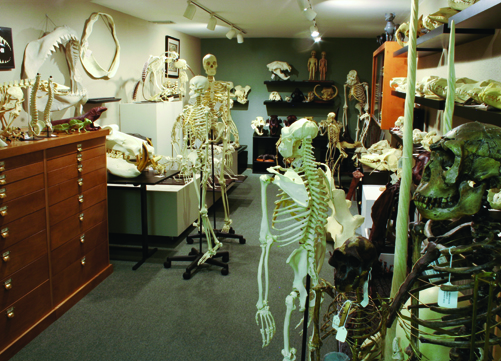
Bone Clones showroom

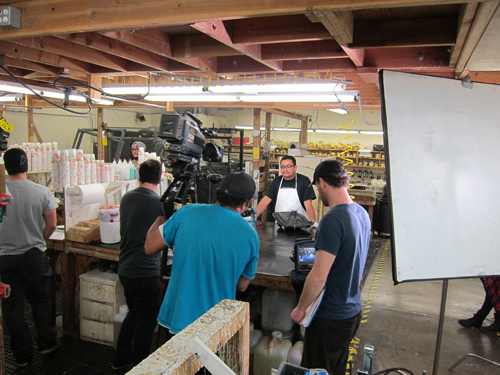
How It's Made filming of Bone Clones' manufacturing process

== Product ==
Bone Clones reproductions are made from a custom blended polyurethane resin. To avoid misrepresentation, all Bone Clones reproductions are stamped with company trademark information.

== Bone Clones in museums and colleges ==
Bone Clones reproductions have been featured in museums and colleges as part of exhibits and exhibitions. Human reproductions can be seen in the "Footsteps Through Time" exhibit at the San Diego Museum of Man in California. In 2004, Glendale Community College in Glendale, California partnered with Bone Clones, Inc. to create the science exhibit "“Bone: The Hidden Structure of Life." This exhibit showcases skeletons of extinct and extant animals, inviting students and visitors to interact with otherwise inaccessible specimens. In 2012, anthropologist Richard Wright used Bone Clones cast BC-110 to train users in quality control when using his CRANID program for determining the ancestry of unidentified human remains. In February 2014, The American Biology Teacher journal featured an article by Mike Darwin Yerky, who used Bone Clones casts to create an engaging and effective lesson plan in hominin evolution for biology students.

Bone Clones have been featured on television, numerous magazine and newspaper articles and museum exhibitions including:

- "Bone Reproduction Company Does it All – Except the Elephant Man" Flash News
- Knoxville NBC News April 2013
- Wired Magazine
- How It's Made, Season 24 Episode 5

== Gallery ==
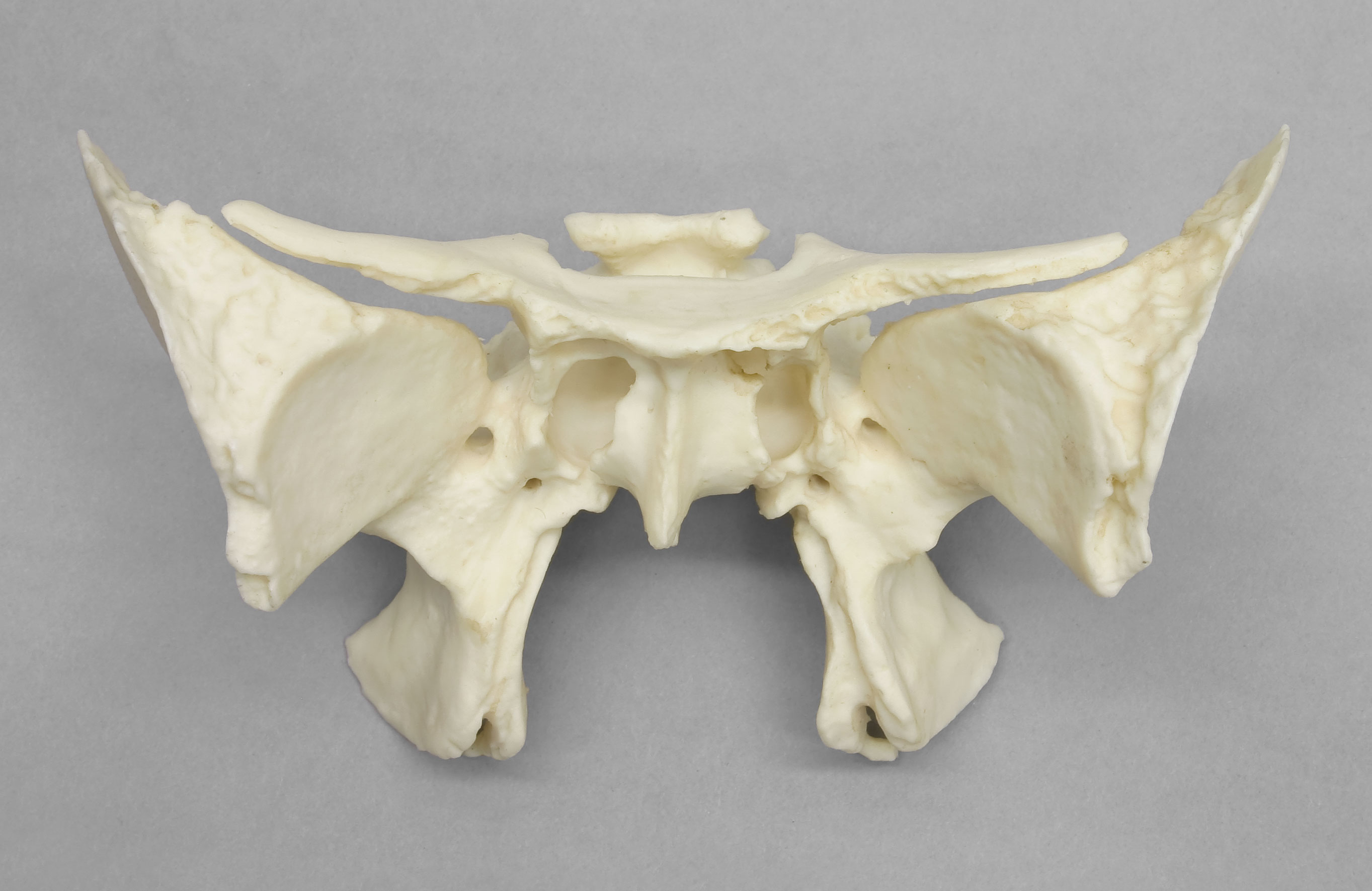
Human sphenoid bone

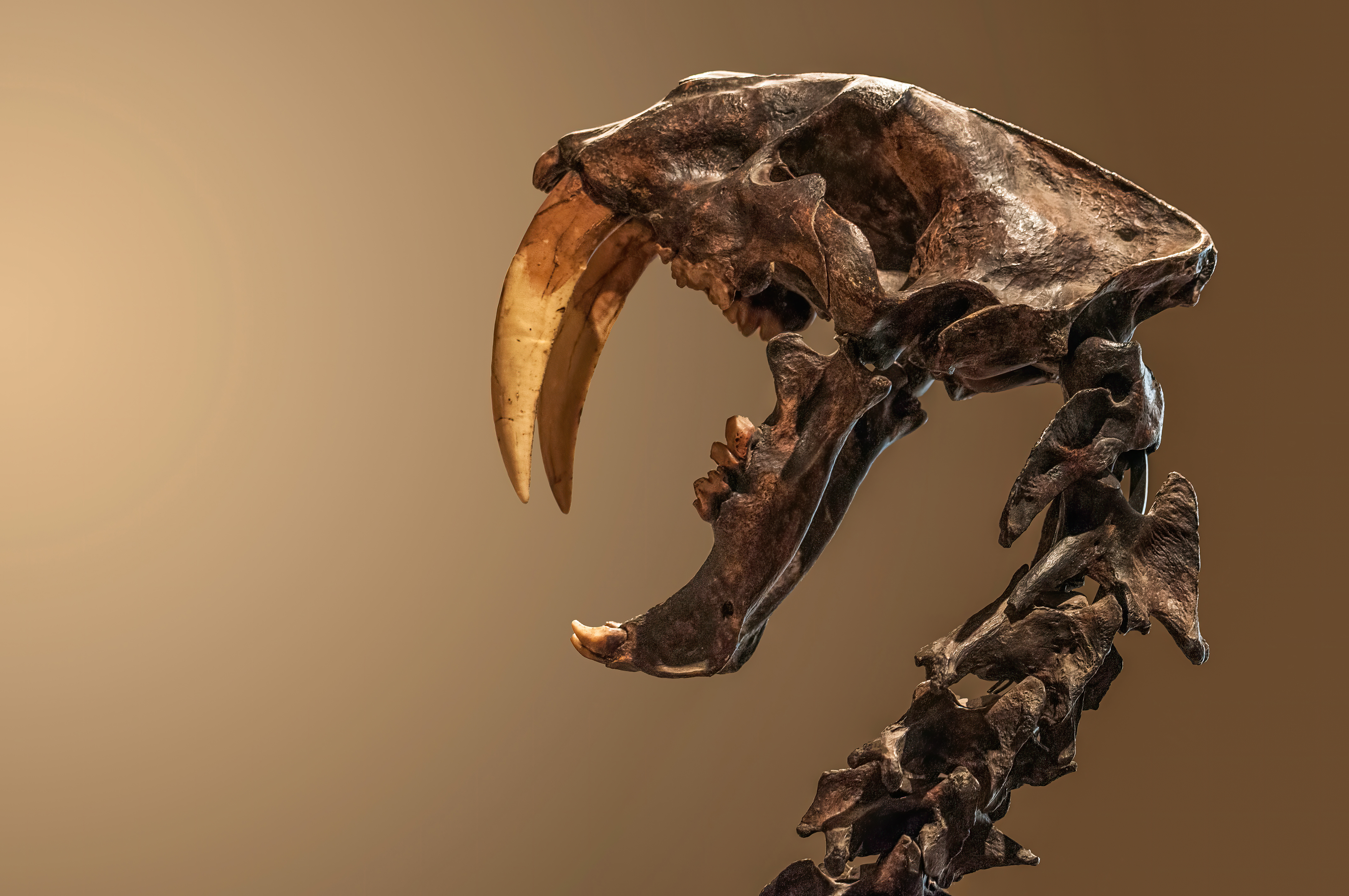
Saber-toothed cat skull, Smilodon fatalis

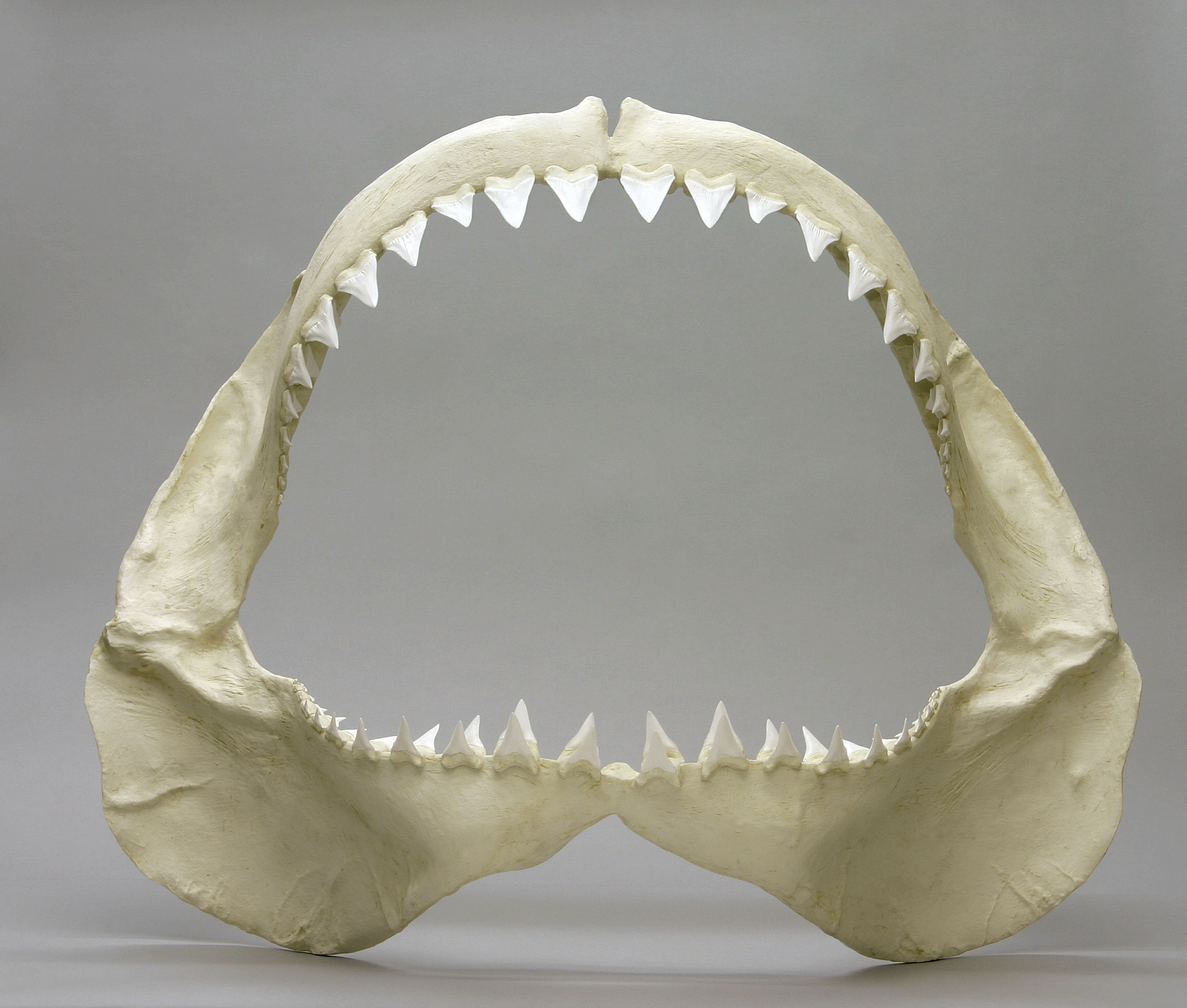
Great white shark jaw

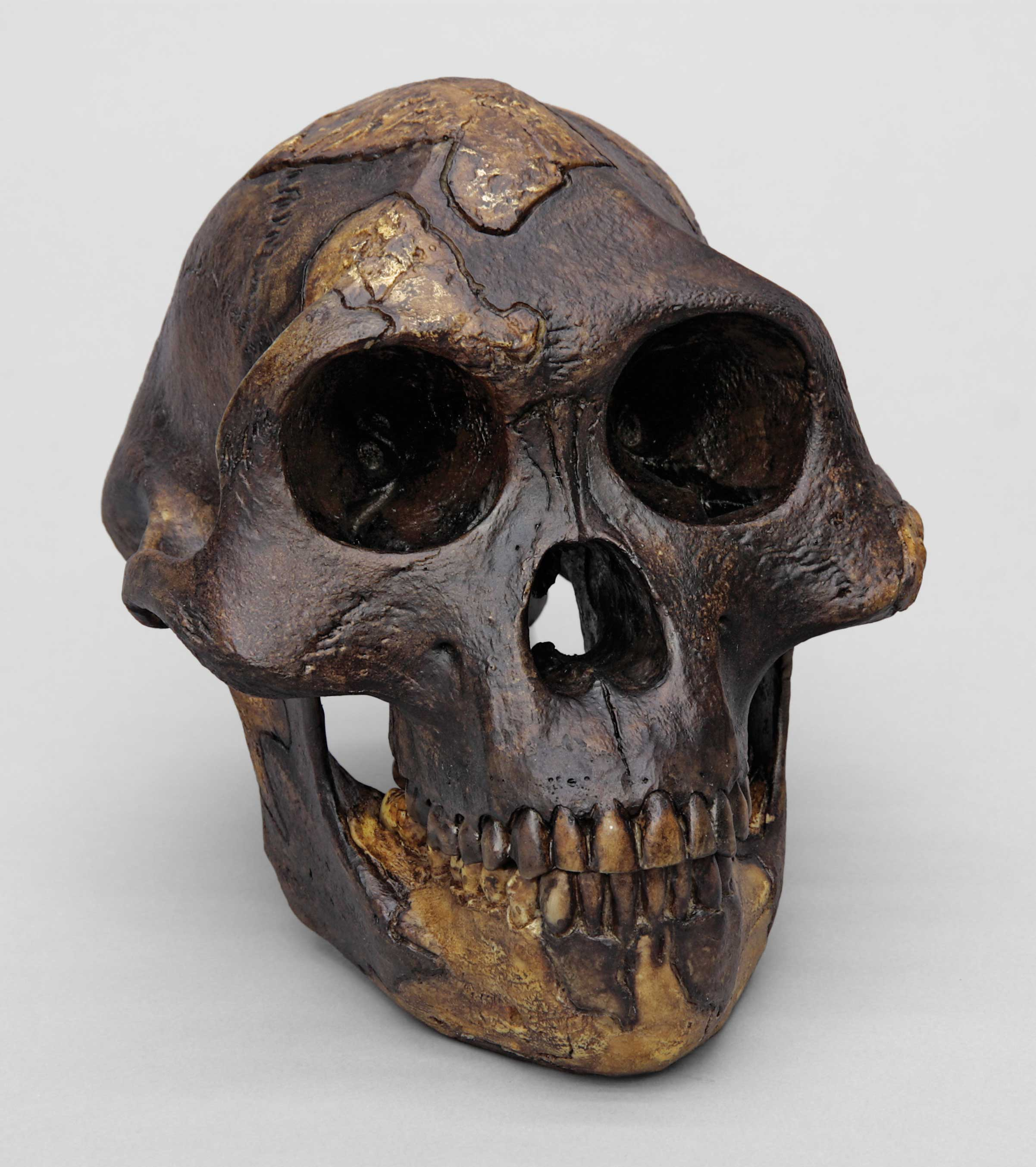
Australopithecus afarensis "Lucy" skull

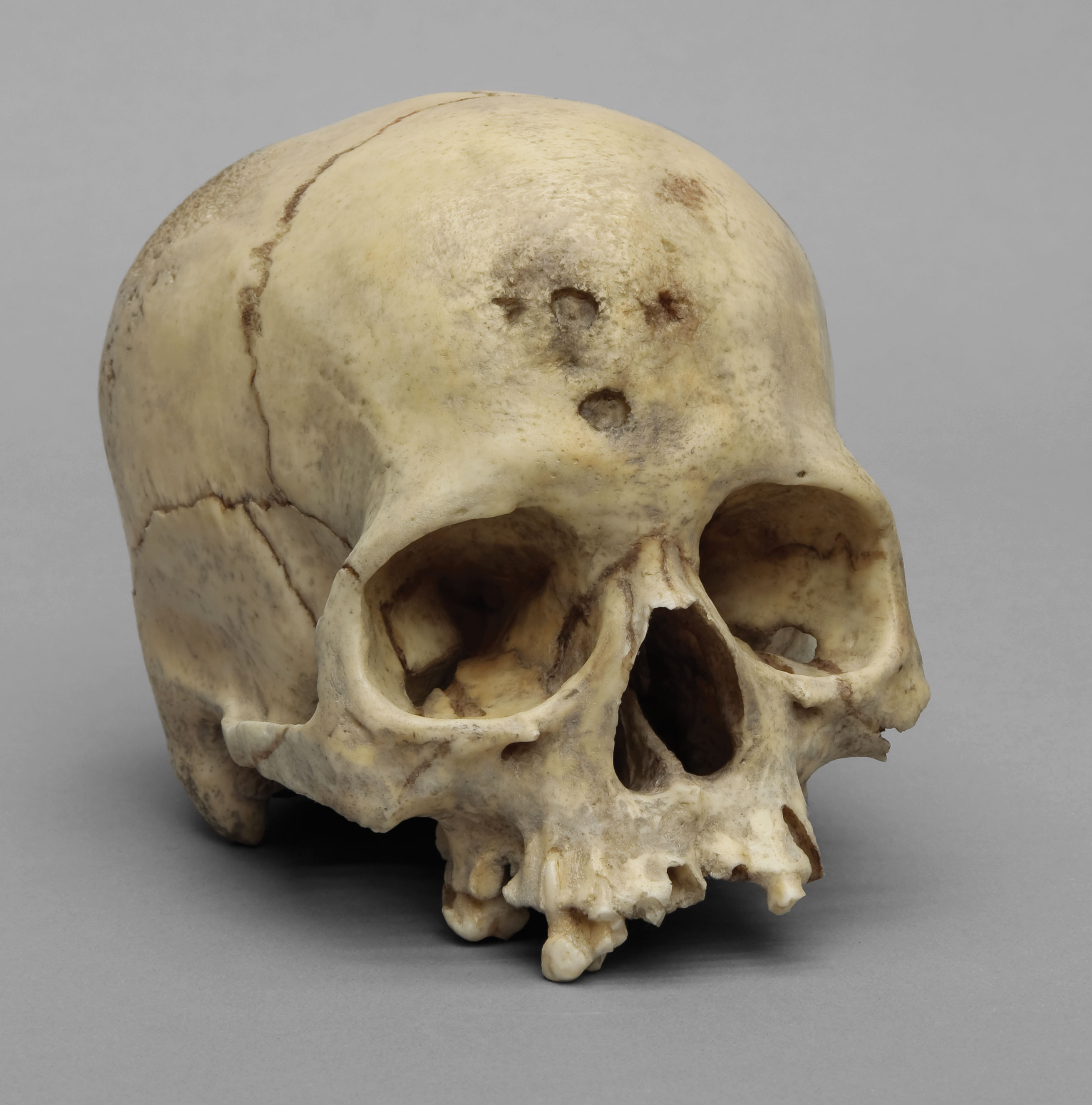
Human female with syphilis from the Aleš Hrdlička Paleopathology Collection at the San Diego Museum of Man in California

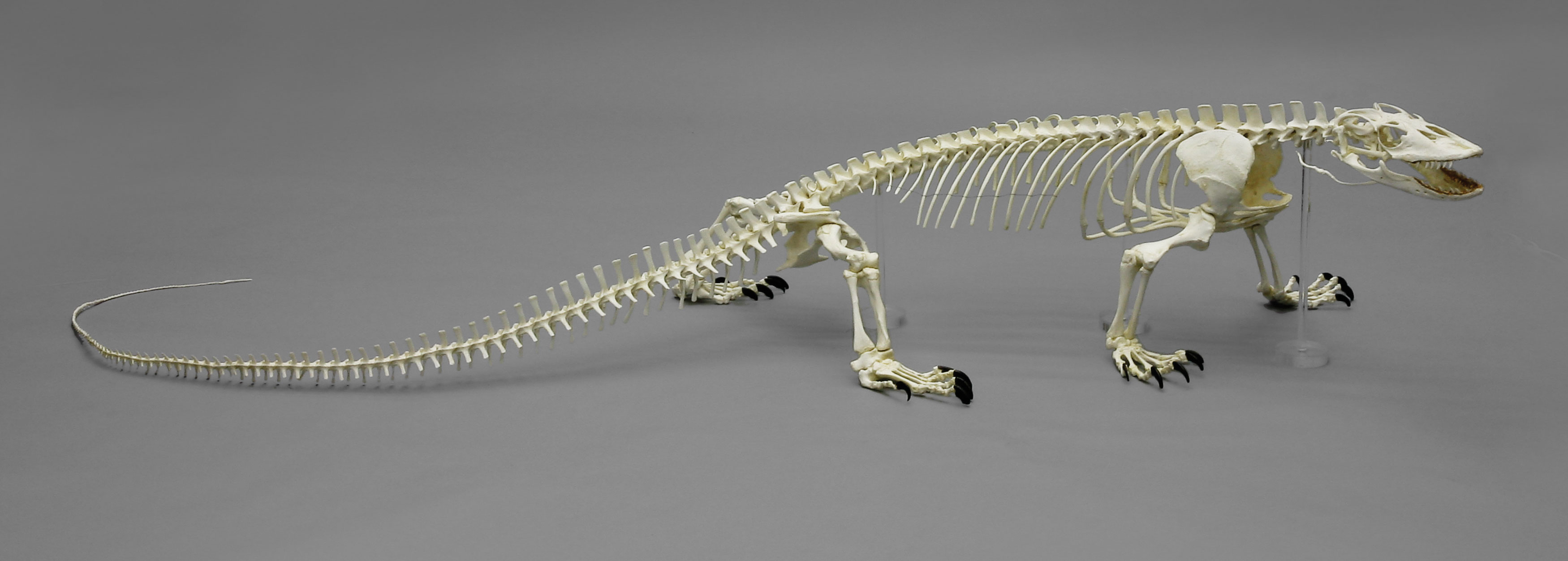
Komodo dragon in walking stance
