= Billy Chapel =

Billy Chapel may refer to:

- Billy Chapel (character), title character of the book For Love of the Game by Michael Shaara
- Billy Chapel (figure skater), American ice skater, in the United States Figure Skating Championships
