= Scott Dacko =

American film director

Scott Dacko is the screenwriter and director of The Insurgents, starring Mary Stuart Masterson, John Shea, Henry Simmons, Juliette Marquis and Michael Mosley. Winner of the German Independence Audience Award for Best Picture for The Insurgents at the 2006 Oldenburg International Film Festival at the world premiere of his debut film. Winner of the Best Screenplay award at his US premiere at the 2007 Palm Beach International Film Festival. Winner of Best Feature at the 2007 Long Island International Film Expo.

== Filmography ==
- The Insurgents (2007)
