= Jim Hemphill =

American filmmaker and film historian (born 1971)

- Born: December 6, 1971 (age 54); United States
- Occupations: Filmmaker, film historian, writer

Jim Hemphill is an American filmmaker, film historian and writer. He began his career writing about film in publications including the Chicago Reader, Film Quarterly and American Cinematographer magazine.

In 2007, he directed the independent horror film Bad Reputation, which won multiple awards at film festivals including Shriekfest, the Chicago Horror Film Festival and the Weekend of Fear in Erlangen, Germany.

In 2012, he directed The Trouble with the Truth, an award-winning independent film starring Lea Thompson and John Shea.

Hemphill works for the Academy of Motion Picture Arts and Sciences as a visual historian, and has contributed audio commentaries to over a dozen Blu-rays.

In 2019, he published his first book, The Art and Craft of TV Directing: Conversations with Episodic Television Directors, from Focal Press.

He has written for IndieWire and is a programming consultant at the American Cinematheque.
