= Firewall (film) =

2006 film by Richard Loncraine

- Theatrical release poster
- Directed by: Richard Loncraine
- Written by: Joe Forte
- Produced by: Armyan Bernstein; Jonathan Shestack; Basil Iwanyk
- Starring: Harrison Ford; Paul Bettany; Virginia Madsen; Mary Lynn Rajskub; Robert Patrick; Robert Forster; Alan Arkin
- Cinematography: Marco Pontecorvo
- Edited by: Jim Page
- Music by: Alexandre Desplat
- Production companies: Village Roadshow Pictures; Beacon Pictures; Thunder Road Pictures
- Distributed by: Warner Bros. Pictures (International); Roadshow Films (Australia and New Zealand)
- Release date: February 10, 2006 (United States)
- Running time: 105 minutes
- Countries: United States; Australia
- Language: English
- Budget: $50 million
- Box office: $82.8 million

Firewall is a 2006 Australian-American action thriller film directed by Richard Loncraine and written by Joe Forte. The film stars Harrison Ford as a chief of security who is coerced by criminals to rob US$100 million after his family is held hostage. Paul Bettany, Virginia Madsen, Mary Lynn Rajskub, Robert Patrick, Robert Forster, and Alan Arkin also stars. It was initially titled The Wrong Element and was going to be directed by Mark Pellington, but he left production in August 2004 after the death of his wife. Loncraine replaced him two months later.

Firewall received negative reviews from critics with criticism for its plot and editing. It was a commercial disappointment, grossing almost $83 million at the box office against a budget of $50 million.

== Plot ==
Jack Stanfield is chief of security of Landrock Pacific Bank in downtown Seattle. He is visited by a collection agency, claiming he owes $95,000 to their online gambling site. Believing the incident is due to an identity theft, Jack entrusts his colleague Harry Romano to take care of the claim. Jack goes out for a drink with Harry who introduces him to Bill Cox, a potential partner. After they leave, Cox climbs into Jack's car and forces him at gunpoint to drive home. There, Jack finds his wife Beth and his two children unharmed, but under surveillance by Cox's man, Willy.

The next morning, Jack is instructed to transfer $10,000 from each of the bank's 10,000 largest depositors – $100 million total – to Cox's offshore accounts. Cox rigs him with a camera and microphone to hinder his ability to ask anyone for help. At Landrock Bank, Cox visits Jack under the alias Bill Redmond, requesting a tour of the bank's security system. On the way back home, Jack attempts to bribe Willy to betray Cox, to no avail. After Willy slipped up (unaware that Jack slipped the camera onto his secretary Janet), Cox kills him. At home, Jack attempts an escape with his family, but is foiled when they discovered Willy's dead body in the car. In retaliation, Cox gives Jack's son Andy a cookie containing nut products, sending him into anaphylactic shock. Cox withholds the treatment, an EpiPen, until Jack acquiesces to their plan.

The next day, Cox forces Jack to fire Janet, fearing she is growing suspicious. Jack complies, but it doesn't end well. Jack initiates a wire transfer to send the money to Cox's offshore accounts. Before leaving, Jack uses an employee's camera phone to take a picture of the account information on the screen. Cox then begins covering his tracks. He forces Jack to delete security data and surveillance tapes and use a virus to cripple the building's system into disarray. Returning home, Jack finds the house empty except for Liam, Cox's enforcer. After realizing that Cox never had any intention of letting him and his family live from the beginning, so as to cover up his crimes, Jack overpowers and kills Liam with a heavy glass blender. He calls Harry, but he does not answer. Jack goes to Harry's house to inquire about Cox, but hearing and witnessing the two entering the house, he goes to hide, where he watches Cox killing Harry with his gun that was confiscated earlier. Beth, held at gunpoint, leaves a message suggesting an affair on Harry's answering machine, implicating Jack in his colleague's death. In addition, the $95,000 debt will be considered motive for Jack embezzling the bank's money.

Jack turns to Janet and reveals the truth. She agrees to help him retrieve the phone with the picture of Cox's account information. Jack hacks into Cox's Cayman Island accounts and transfers the money away. He calls Cox with Liam's phone and they arrange to free his family in exchange for returning the money. During the conversation, Jack hears the family dog Rusty in the background and realizes he can locate his family by the GPS tracking unit in the dog's collar. Cox's gang ditches the dog during mid-drive, but Jack managed to track them to an abandoned farmhouse. He tells Janet to call 911 and approaches the house.

When Vel, Cox's tech guy, takes pity on the family and attempts to intervene with killing them, Cox kills him. Jack's daughter Sarah runs out of the house. Another henchman, Pim, chases after her, but Jack kills him by ramming him with Janet's car, then hits an RV that explodes and destroys the car. Cox takes Beth and Andy to the upper floor, but Jack enters the house and engages him in a final showdown. Their fight eventually leads them into the ditch Cox had dug for Jack's family. Cox temporarily gains the upper hand, but Jack impales him with a pickaxe, killing him and saving his family. Jack reconciles with them before they head back home together.

== Cast ==
- Harrison Ford as Jack Stanfield, chief of security of Landrock Pacific Bank.
- Paul Bettany as Bill Cox, a businessman who holds Jack and his family hostage and forces Jack to transfer $100 million from the bank he works at to his offshore accounts.
- Virginia Madsen as Beth Stanfield, Jack's wife
- Mary Lynn Rajskub as Janet Stone, Jack's secretary
- Robert Patrick as Gary Mitchell, Jack's colleague
- Carly Schroeder as Sarah Stanfield, Jack and Beth's daughter
- Jimmy Bennett as Andy Stanfield, Jack and Beth's son
- Robert Forster as Harry Romano, Jack's colleague who introduces him to Bill Cox
- Alan Arkin as Arlin Forester, Jack and Harry's employer.
- Vincent Gale as Willy, one of Cox's henchmen who runs comms on Jack
- Kett Turton as Vel, one of Cox's henchmen, a computer geek who has compassion for Jack's family
- Nikolaj Coster-Waldau as Liam, one of Cox's henchmen who is the lead enforcer
- Vince Vieluf as Pim, Cox's most sadistic henchman
- Matthew Currie Holmes as Bobby, Landrock Pacific Bank employee
- Beverley Breuer as Sandra
- Ty Olsson as Airport traffic cop

== Production ==
In April 2004, it was announced Harrison Ford was attached to star in the film initially titled The Wrong Element, a thriller produced by Beacon Pictures who'd previously produced the successful Ford-led Air Force One. The script, written by Joe Forte, had initially been set up at MGM by Forte and producer Jon Shestack until the project was put into turnaround with Beacon acquiring the rights and bringing it to Warner Bros. Pictures. Mark Pellington was initially slated to direct, but dropped out due to the death of his wife. Richard Loncraine was hired as director in October 2004.

== Reception ==
=== Box office ===
Firewall opened theatrically on February 10, 2006, in 2,840 venues, earning $13,635,463 in its opening weekend, ranking fourth in the domestic box office. The film ended its run fourteen weeks later, on May 18, 2006, having grossed $48,751,189 in the United States and Canada, and $34,000,000 internationally for a worldwide total of $82,751,189. The film was released in the United Kingdom on March 31, 2006, and opened on #7.

=== Critical reception ===
The film received largely negative reviews from critics. On review aggregator website Rotten Tomatoes, the film has an 19% rating based on 158 reviews, with an average rating of 4.6/10. The site's consensus states: "Harrison Ford's rote performance brings little to this uninspired techno heist film whose formulaic plot is befuddled with tedious and improbable twists." Metacritic reports a 45 out of 100 ratings based on 38 critics, indicating "mixed or average" reviews. Audiences polled by CinemaScore gave the film an average grade of "B+" on an A+ to F scale.

=== Awards ===
Award	Year	Category	Result	Cast/Crew
World Stunt Awards	2007	Best Fight	Nominated	Jason Calder; Mike Carpenter
Young Artist Award	2007	Best Performance in a Feature Film - Young Actor Age Ten or Younger	Nominated	Jimmy Bennett

== Home media ==
Firewall was released on DVD and HD DVD on June 6, 2006, and opened at #2 at the sales chart of DVDs, grossing $10.8 million off 596,000 units. As per the latest figures, 1,286,600 units have been sold translating to $21.1 million in revenue.

== See also ==
- List of American films of 2006
- List of films featuring home invasions
- List of films featuring surveillance
- Tiger kidnapping
