= Grey Lady (film) =

- Film poster
- Directed by: John Shea
- Written by: John Shea; Armyan Bernstein
- Produced by: Armyan Bernstein; Suzann Ellis; John Shea; Kristin Alexandre
- Starring: Eric Dane; Natalie Zea; Adrian Lester; Amy Madigan; Chris Meyer; Carolyn Stotesbery
- Cinematography: Andrzej Bartkowiak
- Music by: Andy Bullington
- Production companies: Beacon Pictures; Broadvision Pictures; Anchor Bay Films
- Distributed by: Starz
- Release dates: June 2015 (Nantucket Film Festival); April 28, 2017 (United States)
- Running time: 105 minutes
- Country: United States
- Language: English

Grey Lady is a 2015 American film directed by John Shea. The film centers on a Boston homicide detective, Doyle (Eric Dane), who searches for clues about a serial killer that murdered both his sister and his partner (Rebecca Gayheart). His search leads him to Nantucket where he uncovers secrets about his family's past. The film was shown at the Nantucket Film Festival in 2015, and was not widely seen until released direct-to-video and video on demand in 2017.

== Plot ==
Boston homicide detective, James Doyle, and his partner/girlfriend, Maggie Wynn, respond to a 911 call made by a woman claiming to be stalked by a man addressing her as Deirdre (the name of Doyle's sister who was murdered weeks earlier). Doyle and Wynn rush to the scene and discover it is a trap. Doyle is wounded and Wynn is killed. Weeks later, Doyle is on leave and is taking the boat to Nantucket. He talks to two women, Eli and the Duchess, and later the Duchess is found murdered. Doyle guesses her killers are the people that killed his partner and sister due to similar wounds.

Doyle attempts to find his aunt Lola, who used to live on the island. At the Rose and Crown restaurant the bartender identifies one of the men in a photo on the wall as Tony and give Doyle his address. Doyle shows Tony the photo and is introduced to the other person in the photo, Angela. She tells Doyle his aunt died the previous year. It is then revealed that Eli and another man were spying on him.

Doyle attends an art gallery and there he meets an artist Melissa. Eli spills wine on a painting by Clara, who asks to be treated to drinks at the after-party as compensation. At the party Eli becomes ill and her companion takes her home. He injects her with a sedative and they then look at pictures of the murder victims and talk about who to kill next.

Eli and her companion show up at Angela's house, take Tony hostage and torture him for information. Doyle arrives and Eli keeps Tony quiet. Tony's friend Junior shows up as Doyle is leaving. Junior runs to retrieve a shotgun. In the subsequent shootout Eli recognizes Angela as Lola.

In the morning, Eli's companion books a massage with Clara whom he murders. Her body is later found on the beach with a wound carved on her back. Eli tells Melissa what happened to Clara. Melissa has a panic attack and a friend drives her to her doctor. Eli picks her up and introduces her companion as her brother Perry. At the house where Clara was killed, Doyle examines photos of the wounds and realizes that the carvings are letters and that the killers are spelling his name. Doyle's phone rings and a priest tells him that a woman wants to speak with him at the church. At the church, Angela confesses she is Lola. She says that the killers are her children who falsely think that Doyle's father Frank killed their father Tim. Lola had stabbed Tim when he attacked her after finding her in bed with Frank.

At the inn, Doyle calls Melissa's phone and hears it ring nearby. Eli is there and tells Doyle that Melissa dropped it and that she is with Perry. Melissa is rescued from Perry and told to hide, but hearing a siren, she rushes towards it only to find Eli shooting at her from a stolen police car and hides under a canoe. Doyle is chasing Perry but is stopped by Eli saying she will kill Melissa if he does not let them go. Doyle drops his gun. Eli attempts to shoot Melissa but is fatally shot by Doyle instead. Perry tells Doyle to kill him too, but he refuses, revealing that Perry is actually his half-brother from Lola's relationship with Frank.

The following morning, a crowd gathers on the beach for a memorial service for Clara. Perry is then taken back to the mainland by the state police. Doyle, on the boat's upper deck reminisces about happier times with his family.

== Cast ==
- Eric Dane as James Doyle
  - Caiden Shea as young Doyle
- Natalie Zea as Melissa Reynolds
- Adrian Lester as Johnson
- Carolyn Stotesbery as Eli Morrison
- Chris Meyer as Perry Morrison
- Amy Madigan as Lola
  - Perri Lauren as young Lola
- Rebecca Gayheart as Maggie Wynn
- Laila Robins as the Duchess
- James Michael Cummings as Marty Maloney
- Eilin O'Dea as Clara Burke
- John Shea as Chief Maguire
- Rocky Rodriques as Tony Ramos
- Billy Sherry as Billy
- Rocky Fox as Junior
- Peg Holzemer as Mikki
- Kelby Turner Akin as Frank Doyle

== Production ==
Production commenced in April 2014, with four weeks of filming on Nantucket, followed by one week in Boston.

== Release ==
The film premiered at the 2015 Nantucket Film Festival, and public screenings commenced on April 28, 2017. The film was released on DVD, and video on demand services on June 27, 2017.
