= Into the Sun (2005 film) =

- DVD cover
- Directed by: Christopher "mink" Morrison
- Screenplay by: Steven Seagal; Joe Halpin; Trevor Miller
- Story by: Steven Seagal; Joe Halpin
- Produced by: Frank Hildebrand; Tracee Stanley-Newell; Steven Seagal
- Starring: Steven Seagal; Matthew Davis; Takao Osawa; Eddie George; William Atherton; Juliette Marquis
- Cinematography: Don E. Fauntleroy
- Edited by: Michael J. Duthie
- Music by: Stanley Clarke
- Production companies: Destination Films; Franchise Pictures
- Distributed by: Sony Pictures Home Entertainment
- Release date: February 15, 2005
- Running time: 96 minutes
- Country: United States
- Languages: English; Japanese; Cantonese
- Box office: $175,563

Into the Sun is a 2005 American action thriller film directed by Christopher "mink" Morrison. It stars Steven Seagal, who also produced and co-wrote the film, along with Matthew Davis, Takao Osawa, Eddie George, Juliette Marquis, Ken Lo, and William Atherton. Filmed and set in Tokyo, Seagal plays a CIA operative who becomes embroiled a conflict between the Japanese Yakuza and the Chinese Triads.

The film was theatrically released in Japan, but only went direct-to-DVD in the United States.

== Plot ==
The assassination of Tokyo's governor Takayama causes a stir of public outrage in Tokyo, Japan. Upon hearing news of the incident, the U.S. FBI asks the CIA's Tokyo office to investigate the killing, believing it to be linked to the yakuza. The Japanese branch of the CIA starts sniffing around under the auspices of the Department of Homeland Security. CIA agent Travis Hunter and his rookie FBI agent understudy Sean Mack are assigned to work on the case and to track down the perpetrators. During their work, Mack proves to be primarily a distraction to Hunter, especially as he is neither very knowledgeable about CIA procedures nor Japanese customs. Hunter, on the other hand, having been raised in Japan, has a strong understanding of the yakuza and their mysterious, eccentric and sinister ways.

Hunter and Mack discover a plan by Kuroda, the boss of a new yakuza outfit, to build an enormous drug-dealing network using his export company in cahoots with a Chinese Triad outfit leader named Chen. Kuroda is killing everyone who gets in his way. While reviewing security footage of the assassination, Hunter identifies a medallion seen around the neck of the shooter that links Kuroda to being the mastermind of the governor's assassination. As Hunter has been told that Kojima, the second-in-command of an old school yakuza group run by elderly Oyabun Ishikawa, is the only yakuza player who is capable of defeating Kuroda, Hunter turns to him for help. When they speak, Kojima tells Hunter that the new yakuza have gained more power after joining forces with the Triads, and are ready to eliminate any other yakuza gang. Kojima then reveals that he and Hunter have something in common - permanently getting rid of Kuroda, adding that it will be interesting to see which one of them kills him first.

Meanwhile, Hunter's relentless pursuit of Kuroda increasingly endangers those associated with him. First, Kuroda has godfather Ishikawa murdered, making Kojima the new leader of Ishikawa's yakuza outfit. Mack gets out of his depth while investigating and is also brutally murdered. But when Kuroda has Hunter's fiancée Nayako savagely slaughtered by sword, Hunter's search for Kuroda becomes devastatingly personal. Teaming up with CIA operative Jewel and tattoo artist Fudomyo-o, whose wife and young child were also killed by Kuroda, Hunter sets out to take down Kuroda.

By nightfall, Fudomyo-o and Hunter arrive at the temple Kuroda uses as his hideout. One-by-one they take on all the members of Kuroda's group with katanas. Mei Ling, former student of Hunter and daughter of his sifu, who was killed by Chen, also arrives just in time to save Fudomyo-o and then teams up with the two men. After Fudomyo-o survives being shot during a confrontation with Kuroda, Hunter then appears and ferociously battles Kuroda, ultimately killing him by slashing his chest. They then leave Kuroda's temple hideout.

The next day, Mei Ling, Fudomyo-o and Hunter hold a memorial service to offer their respects to Nayako. At the same time, a yakuza ceremony is held to formally make Kojima the successor leader. Jewel and her CIA "professional cleaning company crew" arrive at Kuroda's hideout and quickly coat virtually everything with a gooey blue substance. The local authorities arrive shortly thereafter to investigate the scene, and are puzzled by what they find. They take the bodies of Kuroda and his henchmen for autopsy as the weapons are collected for forensic criminal investigation. As the chief inspector comments that the blue goo will keep them from gathering fingerprints, Hunter returns to the park where he and Nayako used to hang out in order to grieve and remember her.

== Cast ==
- Steven Seagal as CIA Agent Travis Hunter
- Matthew Davis as FBI Agent Sean Mack
- Takao Osawa as Kuroda (Japanese: 黒田, Kuroda)
- Eddie George as CIA Agent Jones
- William Atherton as CIA Senior Agent Block
- Juliette Marquis as Jewel
- Ken Lo as Chen (Mandarin: 陈, Chén)
- Kosuke Toyohara as Fudomyo-o (Japanese: 不動明王, Fudōmyōō)
- Akira Terao as Oyabun Matsuda (Japanese: 松田, Matsuda)
- Eve Masatoh as Kojima (Japanese: 小島, Kojima)
- Pace Wu as Mei Ling (Mandarin: 麦玲, Mài líng)
- Chiaki Kuriyama as Ayako
- Kanako Yamaguchi as Nayako (Japanese: なやこ, Nayako)
- Namihiko Ohmura as Takeshi (Japanese: たけし, Takeshi)
- Daisuke Honda as Kawamura (Japanese: 川村, Kawamura)
- Roy Oguri as Kenji (Japanese, 賢司, Kenji)
- Sokyu Fujita as Investigator Maeda (Japanese: 前田捜査官, Maeda sōsa-kan)
- Vikrom Suebsaeng as Chang Choudong (Mandarin, 张崇东, Zhāngchóngdōng)
- Shôji Oki as Oyabun Ishikawa (Japanese, 石川組長, Ishikawa kumichō)
- Dale Payne as Zen Custodian

== Production ==
The original script by Trevor Miller had to be reworked, as it was too similar to The Yakuza, which would have cost too much to license for a remake. The film was announced in 2003 after Franchise Pictures bought the script. Joe Halpin, who rewrote the script, is a former undercover narcotics detective who worked with the Los Angeles County Sheriff's Department and Drug Enforcement Administration. Morrison said that the film, which was shot in Japan, was designed to feel authentically Japanese instead of merely being an American film set in Japan. Seagal had lived in Japan earlier and expressed embarrassment in the DVD commentary over how rusty he was at the use of the Japanese language. Clips from Gamera: Guardian of the Universe (1995) was seen in the background, including Seagal's daughter Ayako Fujitani's scenes.

The director said his "experience with Steven was terrific. I was working on a project very near to his heart as it was set in Tokyo and Steven had lived there for years and speaks fluent Japanese. The only difficulties came from stretching the budget and schedule to work in Tokyo and Thailand with a multi-language speaking cast. I however am very grateful for him giving me the shot to work with him on such a personal project he wrote."

== Release ==
Sony released Into the Sun theatrically in Japan on November 26, 2005, and it grossed $164,762. In the United States, it went direct-to-video, released on February 15, 2005.

== Reception ==
Beyond Hollywood wrote that the film could have been good if it had starred someone besides Seagal, whose extensive scenes of dialogue feel like padding and do not play to his action hero strengths. Ian Jane of DVD Talk rated it 3/5 stars and, while calling it one of Seagal's better recent films, recommended it to fans of mindless action films.
