= Courtney Gains =

American actor (born 1965)

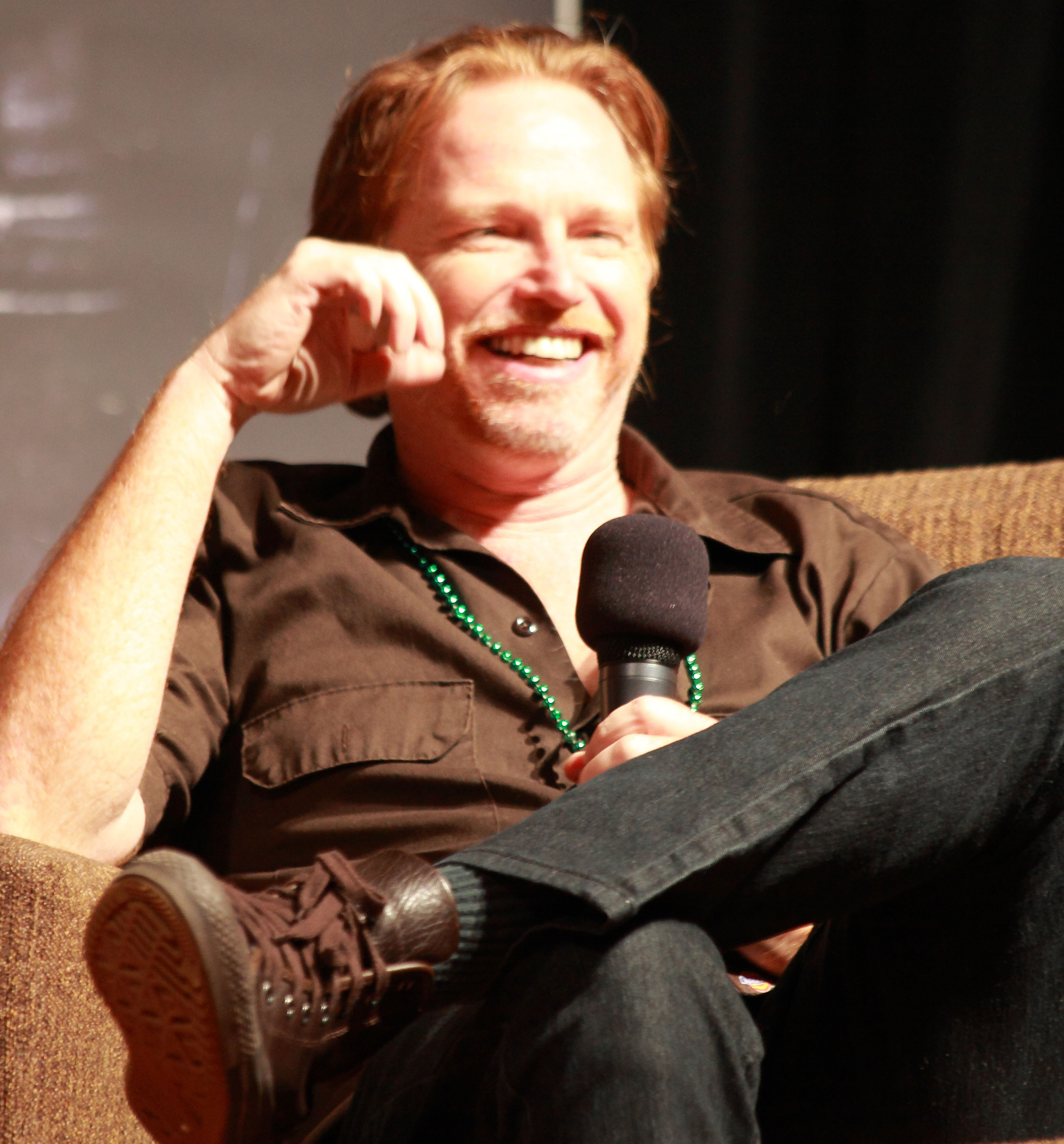
- Gains in 2014
- Born: August 22, 1965 (age 61); Los Angeles, California, US
- Occupation: Actor
- Years active: 1984–present

Courtney Gains (born August 22, 1965) is an American character actor best known for his portrayal of Malachai in the 1984 horror movie Children of the Corn.

== Career ==
Gains achieved success during the 1980s with a variety of roles in films such as Children of the Corn, Hardbodies, Lust in the Dust, Back to the Future, Can't Buy Me Love, Secret Admirer, Colors, The 'Burbs, and Memphis Belle. Later films include Sweet Home Alabama, Dorm Daze (which he also executive-produced), Desolation Canyon, and a cameo in Rob Zombie's Halloween remake.

In addition to his film work, Gains appeared in the video games Wing Commander III: Heart of the Tiger, LA Noire and guest-starred on episodes of various television series, including Seinfeld, Monk, In the Heat of the Night, ER, JAG, Nash Bridges, Diagnosis: Murder, Charmed, Alias and My Name is Earl. Gains has also worked as an acting coach.

Gains worked as a musician and once performed live on stage with Phish, appearing at the band's December 6, 1996 concert in Las Vegas, which was later released on CD as Vegas 96. Gains has since released a solo album.

== Filmography ==
=== Film ===
Year	Title	Role	Notes
1984	Children of the Corn	Malachai	
1984	Hardbodies	"Rag"	
1985	Lust in the Dust	Richard "Red Dick" Barker	
1985	Secret Admirer	Doug	
1985	Back to the Future	Dixon	
1985	The Orkly Kid	Unknown Role	Short
1986	The Children of Times Square	Punk Who Robs Victor	TV movie
1986	Ratboy	Kid In Car	
1987	American Harvest	Chips	TV movie
1987	Winners Take All	"Goose" Trammel	
1987	Can't Buy Me Love	Kenneth Wurman	
1988	Colors	"Whitey"	
1989	The 'Burbs	Hans Klopek	
1990	Memphis Belle	Sergeant Eugene McVey	
1994	In the Line of Duty: The Price of Vengeance	Barlow	TV movie
1997	Behind Enemy Lines	Church	
1997	The Killing Grounds	Vincent Reynosa	Video
1997	Dilemma	"Tex"	
1998	Shadow of Doubt	Ernie	
1998	The Landlady	Tyson Johns	
1998	No Code of Conduct	Cameron	
1999	Dreamers	Mike Watt	
1999	King Cobra	Dr. Joseph McConnell	Video
1999	A Clean Kill	Hood	
2002	Sweet Home Alabama	Sheriff Wade	
2003	National Lampoon Presents Dorm Daze	Lorenzo "The Black Hand"	
2004	No Ordinary Hero	W. Fritz Bean	Short
2004	Headshot	The Writer	Short
2005	Freezerburn	Scooter, The Grip	
2006	The Phobic	Dr. Cecil Westlake	
2006	Desolation Canyon	Jack McAllister	TV movie
2007	Halloween	Jack Kendall	
2008	Alien Encounter	Donovan	
2009	Benny Bliss and the Disciples of Greatness	Benny Bliss	
2009	Shadowheart	Finch	
2009	He's Such a Girl	Barrista	
2010	Cinema Salvation	Courtney	
2010	The Quiet Ones	Michael's Father	
2010	Raven	Danny	
2010	Faster	Prescott Ashton / Telemarketer	
2010	The Ascent	Andrew	
2010	Watch Out for Slick	Benji	
2011	Discipline	Jack Baldwin	
2011	Poolboy: Drowning Out the Fury	Gil Highdecker	
2011	Mimesis: Night of the Living Dead	Gordon	
2011	My Trip to the Dark Side	Bobby G.	Video
2011	2 Flats	Tow Truck Driver	Short
2012	Lose Yourself	Bobby G.	Video
2012	Ambush at Dark Canyon	Sheriff Hurley	
2013	The House Across the Street	Ned	
2014	My Trip Back to the Dark Side	Bobby G.	
2014	Field of Lost Shoes	Captain Chinook	
2015	Halcyon	Robert	
2015	The Funhouse Massacre	Dennis	
2016	Prettyface	"Shorty"	Short
2016	The Bronx Bull	Chain Gang Guard	
2017	It Happened One Valentine's	Freddy Craig	
2017	Trafficked	Frank Anderson	
2017	Goodnight, Gracie	Billy	Short
2017	Urban Myths	Stanley	
2017	Allen + Millie: A Short Romance	Allen Mitchell	Short
2017	Scramble	Rick "Canada Rick"	
2018	Hell's Kitty	Mordicia	
2018	Corbin Nash	Detective Holloway	
2018	Deadly Crush	Lawrence	
2018	Camp Cold Brook	John Brierwitz	
2019	The Silent Natural	"Tug" Wilson	
2019	Candy Corn	Sheriff Sam Bramford	
2020	Await the Dawn	Dr. Hewitt	
2021	Queen Bees	Biker	
2021	River	Dr. Michael Glenn	
2021	Haunted: 333	Deputy Jed	
2021	Charming the Hearts of Men	Mr. Spratz	
2022	Hellblazers	Bernard	
2022	American Bigfoot	Wesley Harlin	
2023	The Wrath of Becky	"Twig"	
2024	Rice Girl: My Redneck Neighbor II	Dirk Reddick	

=== Television ===
Year	Title	Role	Notes
1984	CBS Schoolbreak Special	Joe Newbolt	Episode: "Welcome Home, Jellybean"
1984	Call to Glory	Dave Jensen	Episode: "A Nation Divided"
1985	Misfits of Science	Mechanic	Episode: "Twin Engines"
1987	Starman	Bo	Episode: "The Test"
1987	21 Jump Street	Birch	Episode: "Blindsided"
1988	Vietnam War Story	Albertson	Episode: "The Fragging"
1988	Superboy	Jeff Hilford	Episode: "The Russian Exchange Student"
1988	The Judge	Jody Haney	Episode: "Mountain Grown"
1989	CBS Summer Playhouse	Silas	Episode: "Shivers"
1993	FBI: The Untold Stories	Kirby Anthony	Episode: "Breakpoint"
1993	Seinfeld	The Clerk	Episode: "The Smelly Car"
1993	In the Heat of the Night	Coley Hiffern	Episode: "Hatton's Turn: Part 1 & 2"
1993	Bakersfield P.D.	Doug	Episode: "The Poker Game"
1993	Tales from the Crypt	Frat Boy	Episode: "House of Horror"
1994	Rebel Highway	Deputy 1	Episode: "Runaway Daughters"
1994	ER	Ronnie	Episode: "ER Confidential"
1995	Legend	Asa	Episode: "Knee-High Noon"
1996	JAG	Pete	Episode: "Survivors"
1996	Silk Stalkings	Norman Harrison	Episode: "Divorce, Palm Beach Style"
1996	Pacific Blue	Jim-Joe	Episode: "Cranked Up"
1997	Nash Bridges	Unknown Role	Episode: "Payback"
1997	Diagnosis: Murder	Dwayne Roberts	Episode: "Slam Dunk Dead"
1998	Brooklyn South	Joe Beldon	Episode: "Don't You Be My Valentine"
1998	Arli$$	Dealer	Episode: "His Name Is Arliss Michaels"
2000	Charmed	D.J., Bane's Right Hand	Episode: "Ms. Hellfire"
2002	Fastlane	Detective Guthrie	Episode: "Girls Own Juice"
2003	Alias	Holden Gemler	Episode: "The Getaway"
2003–2004	The Guardian	Roy Cantwell	Guest: Season 2, Recurring Cast: Season 3
2006	NCIS	Gary Silverstein	Episode: "Escaped"
2008	Monk	Frank Nunn	Episode: "Mr. Monk Is on the Run: Part 1 & 2"
2008	My Name Is Earl	Lloyd	Episode: "Sold a Guy a Lemon Car"
2009	CSI: Crime Scene Investigation	Stan Gerber	Episode: "Death and the Maiden"
2011	Southland	Unknown Role	Episode: "Graduation Day"
2013	Franklin & Bash	Lyle	Episode: "By the Numbers"
2014	Switched at Birth	Donny	Episode: "The Past (Forgotten-Swallowed)"
2014	Bones	The Super	Episode: "The Nail in the Coffin"
2014	The Middle	Phil	Episode: "Orlando"
2014	We Are Angels	Parro	Recurring Cast
2014	Perception	Officer James McKenzie	Episode: "Prologue"
2014	Ride the Lightning	"Red" Russo	Episode: "Vengeance Part 3"
2015	Hell's Kitty	Mordicia	Episode: "The Medium"
2015	Texas Rising	Cole Hornfischer	Recurring Cast
2016	It's Always Sunny in Philadelphia	Roach	Episode: "The Gang Hits the Slopes"
2016	Criminal Minds	Todd Burton	Episode: "Keeper"
2022	Tales	Richard	Episode: "Put It on Me"
2023	Paul T. Goldman	Royce	Episode: "Royce Auditioner"

=== Video Games ===
Year	Title	Role
1994	Wing Commander III: Heart of the Tiger	Lieutenant Ted "Radio" Rollins (voice)
2011	L.A. Noire	Eli Rooney (voice)
2023	Grand Theft Auto Online: The Last Dose	Labrat (voice)
