= Ira Heiden =

American television and film actor (born 1966)

- Born: September 22, 1966 (age 58); New York City, New York, U.S.
- Occupation: Actor

Ira Heiden (born September 22, 1966) is an American television and film actor. He played Will Stanton in the 1987 horror film A Nightmare on Elm Street 3: Dream Warriors. Ira's other film roles include the 1988 film Elvira: Mistress of the Dark, Timelock (1996), The Trouble with the Truth (2011), and Ghostbusters: Afterlife (2021).

Heiden had a small recurring role in the ABC hit TV series Alias as C.I.A. techie Rick McCarthy. He has made guest appearances on TV shows such as Family Ties, Step by Step, and Family Matters.

== Filmography ==
Year	Title	Role	Notes
1986	The B.R.A.T. Patrol	Ray	TV film
1987	A Nightmare on Elm Street 3: Dream Warriors	Will Stanton	
1987	Student Exchange	Simon	TV film
1988	Illegally Yours	Andrew Dice	
1988	Elvira: Mistress of the Dark	Bo	
1990	Zapped Again!	Elliott	
1991	Father of the Bride	Stock Boy	
1993	The Pros & Cons of Breathing	Bradley	
1994	Dangerous Touch	Benny	
1996	Timelock	Dr. Teller	
2011	The Trouble with the Truth	Restaurant Host	
2021	Ghostbusters: Afterlife	Mini-Pufts (voice role)	
