= John Shea =

American actor and film producer (born 1948)

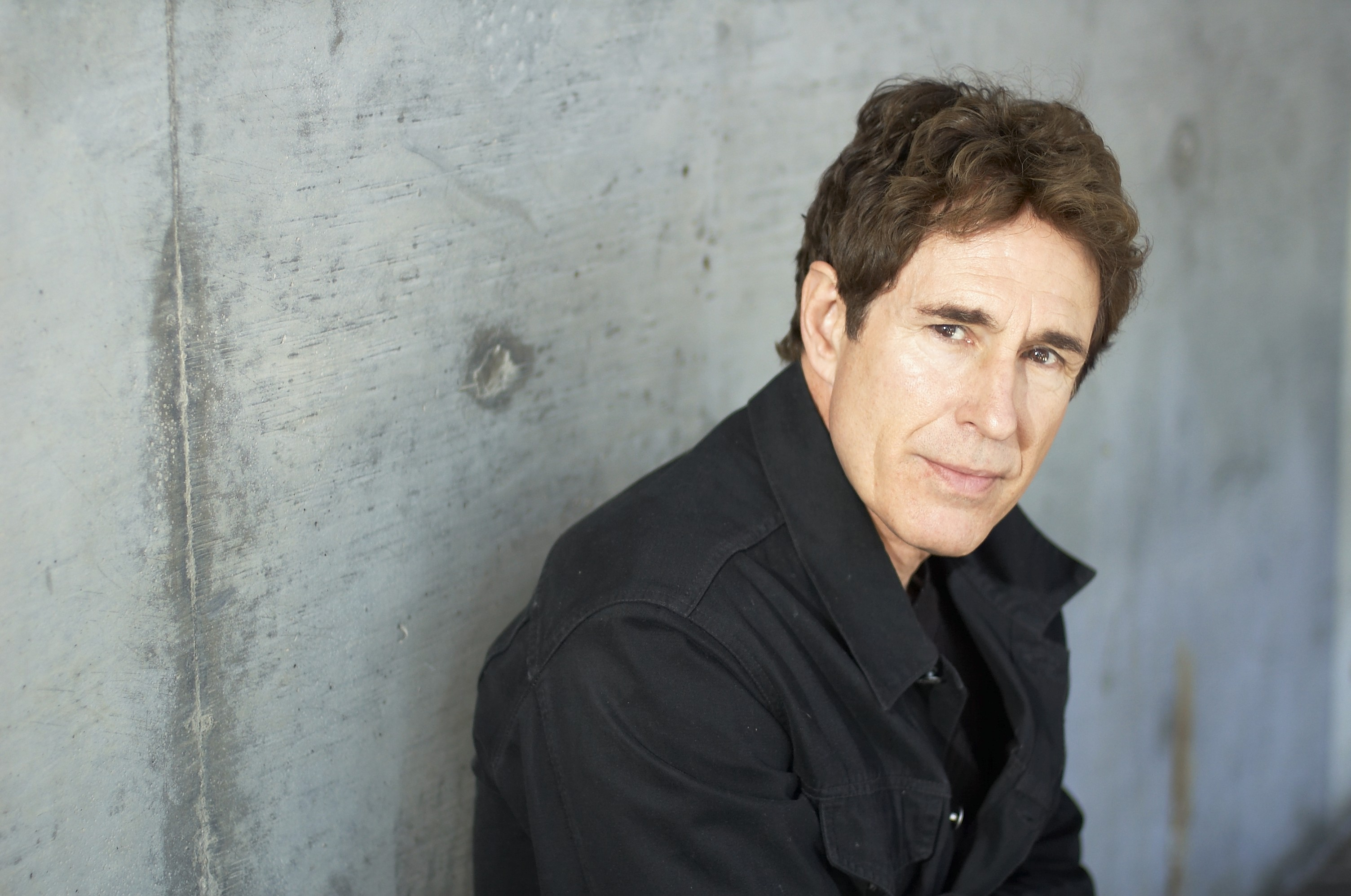
- Born: John Victor Shea III; April 14, 1948 (age 78); North Conway, New Hampshire, U.S.
- Education: Bates College (BA); Yale University (MFA)
- Occupations: Actor, film producer, film director, screenwriter
- Years active: 1975–present
- Known for: Lois & Clark: The New Adventures of Superman
- Spouses: Laura Pettibone (m. 1971; div. 2000); Melissa MacLeod (m. 2001)
- Children: 3

John Victor Shea III (/ʃeɪ/ SHAY; born April 14, 1948) is an American actor, director, producer and screenwriter. His career began on Broadway where he starred in Yentl, subsequently winning his first major award, the 1975 Theatre World Award. Shortly after his Off-Broadway career began, Lee Strasberg invited Shea to join the Actors Studio where he spent several years studying method acting.

He made his television film debut in The Nativity (1978), alongside Madeleine Stowe. Billed alongside Helen Mirren, he starred in the noir film Hussy (1980) and the Academy Award-winning drama Missing (1982). In 1988, Shea won his first Emmy for his performance as William Stern in Baby M. Shea's subsequent films include the comedy thriller Coast to Coast (1987), the drama Windy City (1984), the dark crime feature Small Sacrifices (1989), the political thriller The Insurgents (2006), the Tamil language thriller Achchamundu! Achchamundu! (2009), the drama An Invisible Sign (2010), and the Finnish film The Italian Key (2011).

His breakthrough came when he was cast as Lex Luthor in the 1990s TV series Lois & Clark: The New Adventures of Superman, subsequently being cast as Adam Kane in the 2000s Mutant X series. Shea's public profile increased in 2012 after his five-year role as Harold Waldorf, Blair Waldorf's father on Gossip Girl.

Shea has been noted for his political involvement in social equity, which in 1984 led him to organize the largest peace rally in the history of the United States, garnering praise by various non-governmental organizations such as Amnesty International. In 2014, Shea announced his directorial debut with Grey Lady, released in mid-2017.

== Early life ==
Shea was born in North Conway, New Hampshire, near where his father was teaching at Fryeburg Academy, Maine, and was raised in the Sixteen Acres area of Springfield, Massachusetts, with four siblings. His parents were Elizabeth Mary (née Fuller) and Dr. John Victor Shea, Jr., who served in the U.S. Army during World War II, fighting in the Battle of the Bulge, and who became a teacher, coach and later assistant Superintendent of Schools. Elizabeth Shea introduced John to literature, poetry, classical music, and art and urged him to study the piano.

== Education ==
Shea attended Roman Catholic schools in Springfield, graduating from Cathedral High School, where he captained the varsity debate team and played varsity football and track. Shea studied at Bates College in Lewiston, Maine, where he earned a bachelor's degree in theatre. He performed on the varsity debating and football teams and co-edited the college literary magazine, Puffed Wheat, before graduating in 1970.

He studied acting and directing at the Yale School of Drama of Yale University under Dean Robert Brustein, gaining an M.F.A in Directing in 1973. During his time at the School of Drama, he also performed at the Yale Repertory Theatre, in the Yale cabaret with schoolmates Joe Grifasi and Meryl Streep, and studied film making with Arthur Penn, Sidney Lumet, and George Roy Hill in the film program at the Art and Architecture School.

== Career ==
=== Early work and film debut ===
After a directing apprenticeship at both the Chelsea Theatre under Robert Kalfin and the Public Theater with Joseph Papp, he made his Broadway debut at the age of 26 in Kalfin's production of Isaac B. Singer's Yentl opposite Tovah Feldshuh, for which he received the Theatre World Award. Yentl started Off Broadway at the Chelsea Theatre Center at the Brooklyn Academy of Music and, after a favorable reception, was moved to the Eugene O'Neill Theatre by producer and Actors Studio co-founder, Cheryl Crawford, and was later made into a film starring Barbra Streisand. After seeing his performance Lee Strasberg invited Shea to join the Actors Studio where he spent several years studying method acting. Since his Broadway debut in the mid 1970s, Shea has continued to work in Off-Broadway and Broadway theatre productions, starring in Arthur Kopit's End of the World starring with Linda Hunt and Barnard Hughes. In 1977, during his first trip to Los Angeles to get experience in front of a camera, he played guest roles in such TV series as Eight Is Enough and Man from Atlantis, and co-starred in The Last Convertible, a miniseries for Universal.

=== Early career: 1978–1982 ===
He made his television film debut as Joseph in The Nativity (1978) opposite Madeleine Stowe as Mary, a biblical epic shot in Spain. His feature film debut came in Matthew Chapman's English film noir Hussy (1980), opposite Helen Mirren. His American film debut was in Constantin Costa-Gavras's Academy Award-winning Missing (1982), which starred Jack Lemmon and Sissy Spacek. The film, shot on locations in Mexico, also won the Palme d'Or at the 1982 Cannes Film Festival and helped launch Shea's international acting career.

During the early 1980s, Shea was asked to join the billed cast of Paula Vogel's Pulitzer Prize winning How I Learned to Drive along with Molly Ringwald as well as the following: Anne Meara's Down the Garden Paths, Eugene O'Neill's Long Day's Journey Into Night, the original production of A. R. Gurney's The Dining Room, Peter Parnell's The Sorrows of Stephen, Stephen Poliakoff's American Days, Theodore Mann's production of Romeo and Juliet, Philip Barry's The Animal Kingdom opposite Sigourney Weaver. Shea went on to be cast in the title role in Nancy Hasty's The Director, and, later, in Israel Horovitz's The Secret of Madame Bonnard's Bath.

In 1983, Shea co-starred as Robert F. Kennedy in the critically acclaimed NBC miniseries Kennedy, alongside Martin Sheen as John F. Kennedy and Blair Brown as Jacqueline Kennedy.

=== Breakthrough roles: 1984–2004 ===
In 1984 Shea starred in Armyan Bernstein's Windy City along with Kate Capshaw. He won the "Best Actor" award at the Montreal World Film Festival in 1984.

In 1982, he co-hosted, with Kathryn Walker, the June 12th Anti-Nuclear Rally in Central Park, the largest peace rally in the history of the United States. This rally was the subject of the 1984 documentary film In Our Hands by Robert Richer and Stan Warnow, in which Shea made a cameo appearance.

Shea made his Carnegie Hall debut playing "The Soldier" in Tom O'Horgan's 1985 production of Igor Stravinsky's L'Histoire du Soldat, with Pinchas Zukerman and Andre de Shields. That year, he also starred in a French language speaking role in Lune de miel. In 1986, he made his London West End debut starring in Joseph Papp's production of Larry Kramer's drama The Normal Heart at the Albery Theatre.

In 1987 ABC contracted a network miniseries titled Baby M, in which Shea was cast. His portrayal of William "Bill" Stern received critical acclaim and resulted in him being nominated and winning his first Emmy Award for Supporting Drama Actor. He starred in Small Sacrifices alongside Farrah Fawcett in 1989.

In Grant Tinker's 1990 CBS series WIOU, written by John Eisendrath and Kathryn Pratt, Shea led an ensemble cast briefly before the show's cancellation.

In 1993, Shea was cast as Lex Luthor in the television show, Lois & Clark: The New Adventures of Superman. His portrayal of the DC Comics supervillain received positive reviews, but he left after the first season occasionally returning in later seasons in a guest role. Shea said of the role:

This villain is written as a human being, and not just a one dimensional comic villain or a two dimensional comic villain, the way he might have been portrayed in the comic books or even other films. I thought Gene Hackman was brilliant, but it was a different kind of comic villain.

His starring run of the series ended on an enjoyable note for Shea; the series finale includes a virtual reality sequence in which Luthor flies over Metropolis in a modified Superman costume. Shea recalled, "One day I read the script and I thought, 'Oh my God! I'm really going to get to do this?' And they said yes. You're going to get to fly. ... They just took me out on this boom and they flew me back and forth across the green screen. And they had wind machines blowing and smoke machines, and, oh my God, I felt like I was reborn." After leaving Lois & Clark, Shea starred in a new X-Men inspired series, Mutant X, where he was cast as Adam Kane. The show aired for three seasons before being cancelled.

In 1998 Shea co-wrote and directed the independent film Southie, starring Donnie Wahlberg, Rose McGowan, Amanda Peet, Anne Meara, Will Arnett and Lawrence Tierney. The film won the Seattle International Film Festival award for Best Film, represented the United States at the Montreal International Festival, and was distributed by Lions Gate Films. Shea appeared on Sex and the City as Dominic a month later. He also starred in the independent film The Adventures of Sebastian Cole. Shea was contracted later that year to be a reader on Selected Shorts for Symphony Space, broadcast nationwide on Public Radio International. His reading of Truman Capote's "A Christmas Memory" won AudioFile Magazine's Earphones Award in 1999, as part of the anthology Selected Shorts: Classic Tales, Vol. XII.

=== Mainstream success: 2005–2012 ===
In 2005 he was cast as Trevor Lipton in Law & Order: Criminal Intent.

When casting for Gossip Girl began in 2007, Shea was asked to join the recurring cast as Harold Waldorf, Blair Waldorf's father. His portrayal of the character garnered him increased name recognition among millennials and contributed to his presence in American meme and popular culture. He was cast in Scott Dacko's 2006 political thriller The Insurgents with Mary Stuart Masterson.

Later in 2009 he was cast as Cary Ago's father, Jeffery, a recurring character on The Good Wife. He made his debut into Indian cinema with the 2009 Tamil drama Achchamundu! Achchamundu!, directed by Indo-American film director Arun Vaidyanathan, becoming the first American actor to work in a Tamil film. The film garnered widespread praise and critical acclaim.

Shea voiced the central character Sylvain in the English dub of the animated feature film Gandahar. He was cast in the 2010 American drama film An Invisible Sign with Jessica Alba.

=== Continued work: 2012–present ===
Shea was cast alongside Lea Thompson in the 2012 romantic comedy The Trouble With the Truth. In the summer of 2013 he directed a 40th anniversary production of Edward Gorey's Dracula.

At the start of 2014, Shea appeared in Madam Secretary as Ted Graham. Later that year, he wrote and directed Grey Lady, a romantic thriller set on Nantucket, starring Eric Dane, Natalie Zea, Adrian Lester, Carolyn Stotesbury, Chris Meyer, and Amy Madigan. The independent film, produced by Beacon Pictures and shot by Andrzej Bartkowiak, had its first charity screening in August 2015. It was released on DVD and various streaming services in the summer of 2017.

In 2015, Shea joined the cast of Agent X as Thomas Eckhart. It was announced that Shea would play Dr. Marcus Eldridge in a 2016 episode of Bones.

== Personal life ==
Shea has been married twice. He and his first wife, photographer Laura Pettibone, had one child together, Jake. He and his current wife, the artist Melissa MacLeod, a co-founder of the cooperative (X) Gallery on Nantucket, have two children, Miranda and Caiden.

Shea is the Artistic Director Emeritus of the Theatre Workshop of Nantucket, where he helped produce 40 productions.

== Filmography ==
According to IMDB, Shea has been in a total of 81 movies as an actor, has written, and directed two screenplays that have turned into film (Grey Lady and Southie), and has served as an associate producer on Achchamundu! Achchamundu! as well as an executive producer on his directorial debut, Grey Lady.

=== Film ===
Year	Title	Role	Notes
1980	Hussy	Emory	
1982	Missing	Charles Horman	
1984	Windy City	Danny	
1985	Honeymoon	Zachary "Zack" Freestamp	
1987	Once We Were Dreamers	Marcus	
1987	Gandahar	Sylvain	Voice, English version
1988	A New Life	Doc	
1988	Stealing Home	Sam Wyatt	
1992	Freejack	Morgan	
1992	Honey, I Blew Up the Kid	Hendrickson	
1994	Backstreet Justice	Nick Donovan	
1998	Nowhere to Go	George	
1998	Getting Personal	Mr. DeMarco	
1998	The Adventures of Sebastian Cole	Hartley Cole	
1999	Southie	Peter Binda	Also director and writer
2000	Catalina Trust	Deet Offerman	
2000	The Birthday Party	Dudley	Short film
2002	Heartbreak Hospital	Milo Henderson / Dr. Jonathan	
2006	Pitch	White Man	Short film
2006	A Broken Sole	Bob	
2006	The Insurgents	Robert	
2008	Framed	David Murray	
2009	Achchamundu! Achchamundu!	Theodore Robertson	Also producer
2010	An Invisible Sign	Dad	
2010	Julius Caesar	Julius Caesar	
2011	51	Sam Whitaker	
2011	The Italian Key	Older Alexander	
2012	The Trouble with the Truth	Robert	
2012	A Deadly Obsession	Dr. Egan	
2013	Northern Borders	Doc Harrison	
2013	Anatomy of the Tide	Davis Harriman	
2015	The Picture of Dorian Grey	Lord Wotton	Short film
2017	Grey Lady	Chief Maguire	Also director, producer and writer
2018	Dr. Sugar	Dr. Jack Saccharine	Short film
2018	Boyfriend's Deceit	Mr. Stein	
2020	Dead Reckoning	FBI Agent Hanley	
2022	Cape Carl	Francis Hamilton	Also producer

=== Television ===
Year	Title	Role	Notes
1977	Eight Is Enough	Jonathan Moraacci	Episode: "Triangles"
1977	Barnaby Jones	Max Tate	Episode: "Gang War"
1977	Man from Atlantis	Romeo	Episode: "The Naked Montague"
1978	The Rock Rainbow	Speed	Television film
1978	The Nativity	Joseph	Television film
1979	The Convertible	Terry Garrigan	Miniseries (3 episodes)
1981	Family Reunion	James Cookman	Television film
1982	CBS Library	Hondo Bill	Episode: "Robbers, Rooftops and Witches" (segment: "The Chaparral Prince")
1983	Kennedy	Robert F. Kennedy	Miniseries (7 episodes)
1984	The Dining Room	Client / Howard / Psychiatrist	Television film
1985	Hitler's SS: Portrait in Evil	Karl Hoffman	Television film
1985	Alfred Hitchcock Presents	Brian Whitman	Episode: "The Human Interest Story"
1986	A Case of Deadly Force	Michael O'Donnell	Television film
1987	Screen Two	John Carloff	Episode: "Coast to Coast"
1987	The Hitchhiker	Jeremy	Episode: "Minuteman"
1987	The Impossible Spy	Elie Cohen	Television film
1989	Magic Moments	Troy Gardner	Television film
1989	Do You Know the Muffin Man?	Roger Dollison	Television film
1989	Small Sacrifices	Frank Joziak	Miniseries
1990–1991	WIOU	Hank Zaret	Recurring role (18 episodes)
1992	Notorious	Devlin	Television film
1992	Ladykiller	Jack Packard	Television film
1992	Lincoln	John Barnes	Voice, television film
1993	Tales from the Crypt	Father John Sejac	Episode: "As Ye Sow"
1993–1997	Lois & Clark: The New Adventures of Superman	Lex Luthor / Pino "Pretty-Face" Dragonetti	Recurring role (25 episodes)
1994	Justice in a Small Town	Tommy Marchant	Television film
1994	Leslie's Folly	Daniel	Television film
1995	See Jane Run	Dr. Michael Ravenson	Television film
1995	Almost Perfect	Paul Sterling	Episode: "The Ex-Files"
1996	Forgotten Sins	Sheriff Matthew Bradshaw	Television film
1996	A Weekend in the Country	Michael Kaye	Television film
1997	The Apocalypse Watch	Harry Latham / Lassiter	Television film
1998	A Will of Their Own	Jonathan Abbott	Miniseries
1999	Sex and the City	Dominic	Episode: "Evolution"
2001	That's Life	Ashley Wilkinson	Episode: "Miracle at the Cucina"
2001–2004	Mutant X	Adam Kane	Recurring role (50 episodes)
2003, 2005	Law & Order	John David Myers, Isaac Waxman	2 episodes
2005	Medium	David Morrow	Episode: "Still Life"
2005, 2008	Law & Order: Criminal Intent	Trevor Lipton, Mr. Walker	2 episodes
2007–2012	Gossip Girl	Harold Waldorf	Recurring role (6 episodes)
2009	Eleventh Hour	Kristopher Merced	Episode: "Olfactus"
2012	Common Law	Judge Franklin Whitaker	Episode: "Pilot"
2012	The March Sisters at Christmas	Mr. Lawrence	Television film
2012–2013	The Good Wife	Jeffrey Agos	2 episodes
2014	Madam Secretary	Ted Graham	Episode: "Passage"
2015	Elementary	Bill Wellstone	Episode: "The Cost of Doing Business"
2015	Agent X	Thomas Eckhart	10 episodes
2016	Bones	Dr. Marcus Eldridge	Episode: "The Stiff in the Cliff"
2017	Love at First Glance	Marshall	Television film
2018	Deception	Abe Dietrich	Episode: "Escapology"
2019	Proven Innocent	Sam Marshall	Episode: "The Struggle for Stonewall"
2021	The Blacklist	Senator Brian Warwick	Episode: "Ogden Greeley (No. 40)"
2022	Blue Bloods	Dr. Kirk Connor	Episode: "Tangled Up in Blue"

=== Theater ===
Year	Title	Role	Notes
1975–1976	Yentl	Avigdor	
1977	Long Day's Journey Into Night	Edmund Tyrone	
1977	Romeo and Juliet	Paris	also Romeo understudy
1980	American Days	unknown role	
1984	End of the World	Michael Trent	

== Awards and nominations ==
Year	Nominated work	Award	Category	Result
1975	Yentl	Theatre World Award	Play or screenwriting	Won
1981	American Days	Drama Desk Award	Outstanding Featured Actor in a Play	Nominated
1984	Windy City	Montreal World Film Festival's Best Actor Award	Best Actor	Won
1988	Baby M	Emmy Award for Supporting Drama Actor	Lead Drama Actor	Won
