= The Broken Place =

Novel by Michael Shaara

First edition

The Broken Place is a novel by American author Michael Shaara. It was published by the New American Library in 1968. It has been described as partially autobiographical.

The title was taken from a passage in Ernest Hemingway's A Farewell to Arms.

== Plot ==
The plot concerns a Korean War veteran who comes home from the war depressed. With deep psychological wounds, he only feels alive in the world of boxing.

== Reception ==
A review in the Tallahassee Democrat thought The Broken Place was a "remarkable first novel", particularly the "reality and meaning" that Shaara gives to the characters. Similarly, Ed Hirshberg, in The Orlando Sentinel, opined that while the book had "some stylistic difficulties"—particularly with repetition and overuse of "trite phrases"—, the characters that make up the novels world are both "genuine and realistic". James Parrish, writing in The Tampa Tribune, called the novel "at once tough and tender" and thought it an "intellectual novel" in "the best sense of the word".
