= The Insurgents =

- Directed by: Scott Dacko
- Written by: Scott Dacko
- Produced by: Gregory Segal; John A. Gallagher; Elana Pianko
- Starring: John Shea; Mary Stuart Masterson; Juliette Marquis; Michael Mosley; Henry Simmons
- Cinematography: Learan Kahanov
- Edited by: Robert M. Reitano
- Music by: Mario Grigorov
- Distributed by: Allumination FilmWorks
- Release dates: September 8, 2006 (Oldenburg Film Festival); November 9, 2007 (United States)
- Running time: 85 minutes
- Country: United States
- Language: English

The Insurgents is the feature film debut of director Scott Dacko. It stars Mary Stuart Masterson, John Shea, Henry Simmons, Juliette Marquis and Michael Mosley. Shot on 24p, high-definition video in New York City in February 2006, the story revolves around four politically disillusioned Americans who build a truck bomb to spark a revolution.

== Critical response ==
Writing in Variety, critic Lisa Nesselson described the film as "sometimes clunky in execution but always lively on an intellectual level" and "[t]alky but intriguing," and noted that it "makes the most of its compact cast of attractive [actors] and low budget."

== Honors and awards ==
In its world premiere at the 2006 Oldenburg International Film Festival, The Insurgents won the German Independence Audience Award for Best Picture. In its US premiere at the 2007 Palm Beach International Film Festival, The Insurgents won the Best Screenplay award. The Insurgents won Best Feature - Video at the 2007 Long Island International Film Expo.
