= The Nativity (film) =

- Genre: Religion; Drama; Family
- Written by: Morton S. Fine; Millard Kaufman
- Directed by: Bernard L. Kowalski
- Starring: Madeleine Stowe; John Shea; Jane Wyatt; Paul Stewart; Audrey Totter; George Voskovec
- Music by: Lalo Schifrin
- Country of origin: United States
- Original language: English

Production
- Executive producers: R.S. Allen; Harvey Bullock
- Producer: William P. D'Angelo
- Production locations: Almería, Andalucía, Spain
- Cinematography: Gábor Pogány
- Editors: Jerry Dronsky; Robert Phillips
- Running time: 98 minutes
- Production company: 20th Century Fox Television

Original release
- Network: ABC
- Release: December 17, 1978

The Nativity is a 1978 American made-for-television biographical drama film starring Madeleine Stowe as Mary, set around the Nativity of Jesus and based on the accounts in the canonical Gospels of Matthew and Luke, in the apocryphal gospels of Pseudo-Matthew and James, and in the Golden Legend. It was directed by Bernard L. Kowalski, written by Morton S. Fine and Millard Kaufman, and filmed in Almería, Spain.

== Cast ==
- Madeleine Stowe as Mary
- John Shea as Joseph
- Jane Wyatt as Anna
- Paul Stewart as Zacharias
- Audrey Totter as Elizabeth
- George Voskovec as Joachim
- Freddie Jones as Diomedes
- John Rhys-Davies as Nestor
- W. Morgan Sheppard as Flavius
- Kate O'Mara as Salome
- Leo McKern as Herod
- Geoffrey Beevers as Eleazar

== Home video ==
The film was released on VHS on October 16, 2001.

== See also ==
- Life of the Virgin
- List of Christmas films
