= Michael Shaara =

American novelist (1928–1988)

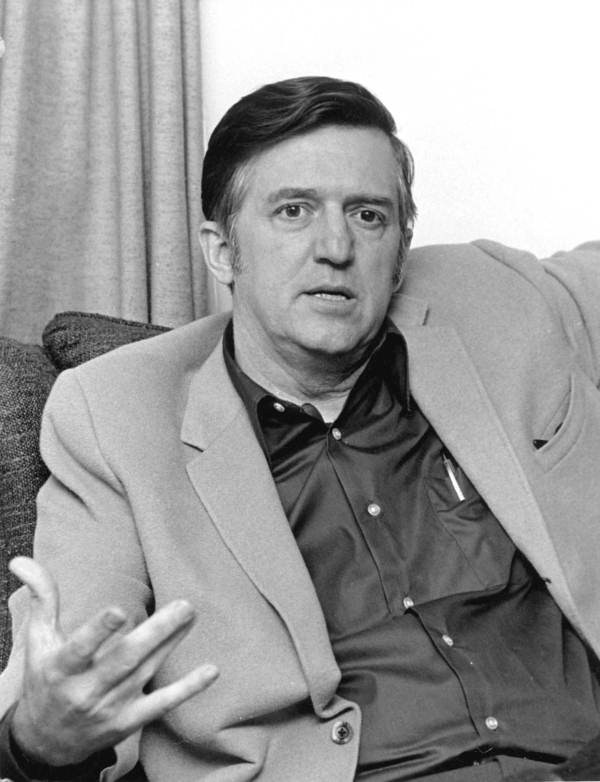
- Michael Shaara ca. 1970
- Born: 23 June 1928; Jersey City, New Jersey, U.S.
- Died: 5 May 1988 (aged 59); Tallahassee, Florida, U.S.
- Education: Rutgers University (BA)
- Occupation: Novelist
- Children: 2, including Jeffrey Shaara
- Writing career
- Period: 1952–1988
- Genres: Science fiction, historical fiction, sports fiction
- Notable work: The Killer Angels
- Notable awards: Pulitzer Prize for Fiction

Michael Shaara (June 23, 1928 – May 5, 1988) was an American author of science fiction, sports fiction, and historical fiction.

== Biography ==
Shaara was born to an Italian immigrant father (the family name was originally spelled Sciarra, which in Italian is pronounced in a similar way) in Jersey City, New Jersey, graduated in 1951 from Rutgers University, where he joined Theta Chi, and served as a sergeant in the 82nd Airborne Division prior to the Korean War.

Before Shaara began selling science fiction stories to fiction magazines during the 1950s, he was an amateur boxer and police officer. The stress combined with cigarette smoking led to a heart attack at the early age of 36. He managed to recover completely and later taught literature at Florida State University while continuing to write fiction. His novel about the Battle of Gettysburg, The Killer Angels, won the Pulitzer Prize for Fiction in 1975. Shaara died of a heart attack in 1988 at the age of 59.

Shaara's children, Jeffrey and Lila, are also novelists. In 1997, Jeffrey Shaara established the annual Michael Shaara Award for Excellence in Civil War Fiction, awarded at Gettysburg College.

== Works ==
=== Novels ===
- The Broken Place (1968)
- The Killer Angels (1974), Winner of the Pulitzer Prize for Fiction in 1975. Later, used as the basis for the film Gettysburg in 1993.
- The Noah Conspiracy (1981), also known as The Herald.
- For Love of the Game (1991), made into a film in 1999.

=== Short story collections ===
- Soldier Boy (1982)

=== Short stories ===
- "Orphans of the Void" (1952)
- "All the Way Back" (1952)
- "Grenville's Planet" (1952)
- "Be Fruitful and Multiply" (1952)
- "Soldier Boy" (1953)
- "The Book" (1953)
- "The Sling and the Stone" (1954)
- "Wainer" (1954)
- "The Holes" (1954)
- "Time Payment" (1954)
- "Beast in the House" (1954)
- "The Vanisher" (1954)
- "Come to My Party" (1956)
- "Man of Distinction" (1956)
- "Conquest Over Time" (1956)
- "2066: Election Day" (1956)
- "Four-Billion Dollar Door" (1956)
- "Death of a Hunter" (1957)
- "The Peeping Tom Patrol" (1958)
- "The Lovely House" (1958)
- "Citizen Jell" (1959)
- "Opening Up Slowly" (1973)
- "Border Incident" (1976)
- "Starface" (1982)
- "The Dark Angel" (1982)
