= The Trouble with the Truth (film) =

2011 film directed by Jim Hemphill

- Directed by: Jim Hemphill
- Written by: Jim Hemphill
- Starring: John Shea; Lea Thompson; Danielle Harris
- Release date: 2012
- Language: English

The Trouble with the Truth is a 2012 American romantic drama film written and directed by Jim Hemphill. Starring John Shea and Lea Thompson.

== Plot ==
Two divorcees, Robert and Emily, meet after their daughter Jenny's (Danielle Harris) engagement, the film follows their conversation over dinner as they reassess their life and relationship, discovering that a sexual spark still exists between them.

== Cast ==
- Lea Thompson as Emily
- John Shea as Robert
- Danielle Harris as Jenny
- Keri Lynn Pratt as Heather
- Rainy Kerwin as Staci
- Ira Heiden as Restaurant Host

== Critical reception ==
The film has drawn comparison with Richard Linklater's Before Sunrise and Before Sunset, and Louis Malle's My Dinner with Andre for its minimalist plot, with Roger Ebert noting that "it is a very small movie with very deep feelings."

The Hollywood Reporter wrote in its review, "Not since My Dinner With Andre has a film consisting largely of a single conversation been such compelling viewing. While Jim Hemphill’s The Trouble With the Truth lacks the thematic heft of Louis Malle’s classic, this portrait of a middle-aged divorced couple reassessing their lives and relationship is the sort of subtle, grown-up drama all too often missing even from indie cinema."
