= Cross My Heart (1987 film) =

1987 film by Armyan Bernstein

- Theatrical release poster
- Directed by: Armyan Bernstein
- Written by: Armyan Bernstein; Gail Parent
- Produced by: Lawrence Kasdan
- Starring: Martin Short; Annette O'Toole
- Cinematography: Thomas Del Ruth
- Edited by: Mia Goldman
- Music by: Bruce Broughton
- Production company: Northern
- Distributed by: Universal Pictures
- Release date: November 13, 1987 (USA)
- Running time: 90 minutes
- Country: United States
- Language: English
- Budget: $7 million
- Box office: $1,025,762

Cross My Heart is an American romantic comedy that was released in the United States on November 13, 1987. It stars Martin Short and Annette O'Toole, and was directed by Armyan Bernstein. It received mixed reviews from critics, and was a box-office bomb. Bernstein has not directed another film.

== Plot ==
Bruce Gaynor advises David Morgan while Nancy advises Kathy on what to do on their third and most intimate date.

Although they have dated twice, they have not revealed their biggest secrets. This third date challenges their relationship as the truths surface. Both parties find that honesty is the best policy.

== Cast ==
- Martin Short as David Morgan
- Annette O'Toole as Kathy
- Paul Reiser as Bruce Gaynor
- Joanna Kerns as Nancy
- Jessica Puscas as Jessica
- Lee Arenberg as Parking Attendant
- Corinne Bohrer as Susan
- Jason Stuart as Waiter
- Shelley Taylor Morgan as Woman in Restaurant
- Eric Poppick as Maitre D
- Steven J. Zmed as Fumbling Spa Attendant

== Reception ==
Cross My Heart holds a rating of 42% on Rotten Tomatoes, based on 12 reviews. Audiences polled by CinemaScore gave the film an average grade of "C" on a scale of A+ to F.

== Home Video ==
The film was released on VHS in 1988 by MCA Home Video and contains a trailer for the film Positive I.D.. Universal released the film on DVD on August 3, 2010.

In June 2022, Mill Creek Entertainment released Cross My Heart on Blu-ray as a single-disc double-feature, with the 1991 Martin Short comedy Pure Luck.
