= Armyan Bernstein =

American film director (born 1947)

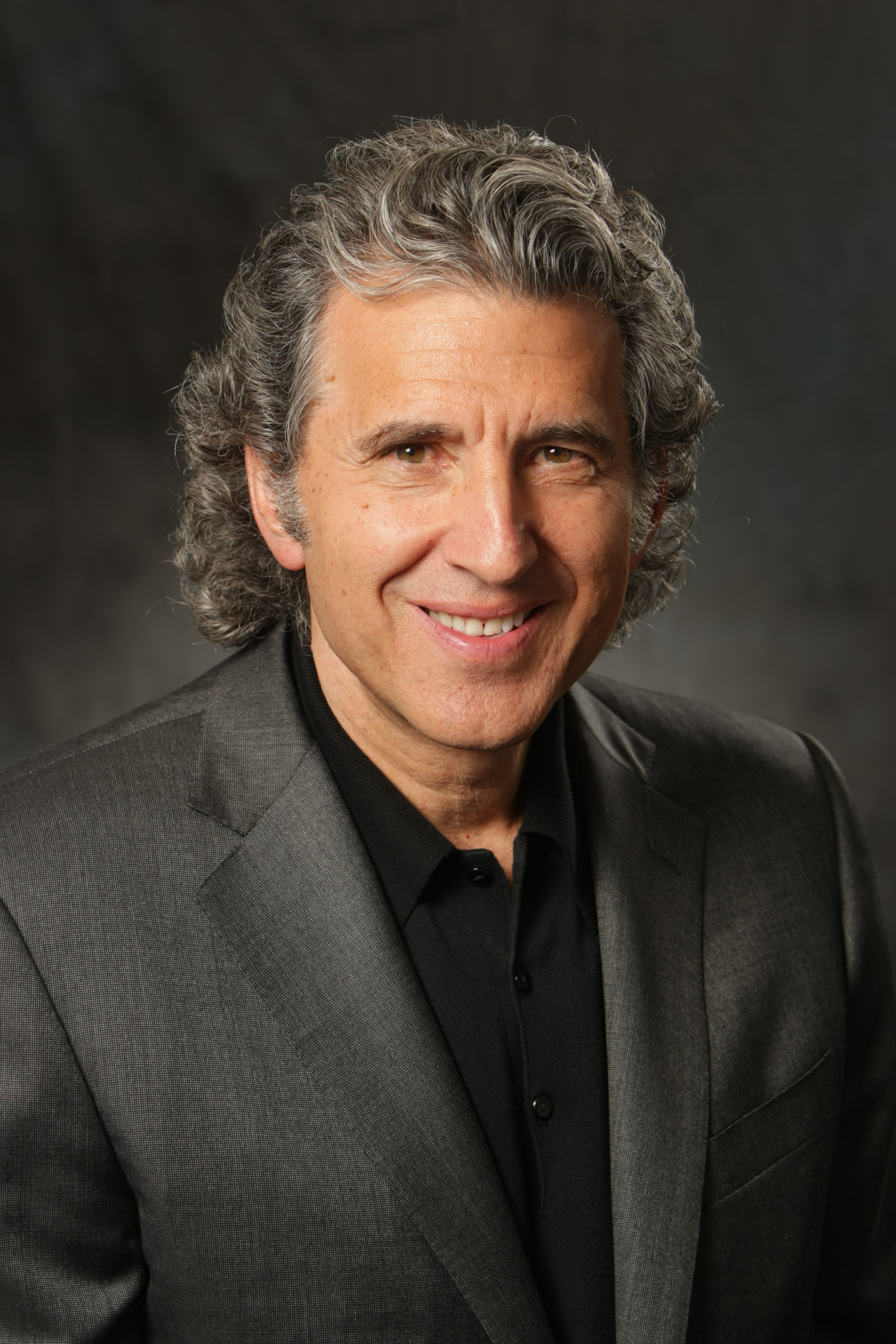
- Bernstein in 2007
- Born: Barry Bernstein; August 12, 1947 (age 78); United States
- Occupations: Film producer, screenwriter, film director
- Spouse: Christine Meleo

Barry "Armyan" Bernstein (born August 12, 1947) is an American film and television producer, director and screenwriter. He is the co-founder and chairman of the film/television company Beacon Pictures.

== Career ==
Bernstein has produced, executive produced, written or directed more than 40 films, including Air Force One, The Hurricane (which he also co-wrote), Spy Game, The Family Man, The Guardian, Children of Men, the Dawn of the Dead remake, Bring It On, Open Range, Thirteen Days, A Lot Like Love, Firewall and End of Days. Films he has produced via Beacon Pictures include Ladder 49, Raising Helen, For Love of the Game and The Water Horse.

In television, Bernstein was the Executive Producer of the TNT series Agent X and the ABC series Castle, created by Andrew Marlowe, who wrote Air Force One and End of Days for Beacon.

Bernstein also produced the Broadway musical Bring It On, which was nominated for a Tony for Best Musical.

Bernstein has received many awards including being honored as Showest Producer of the Year, and winning the USC Scripter Award for his screenplay for The Hurricane.

He is also the founder and chairman of the upcoming sports league, The People's Games.

Bernstein founded Beacon Communications in 1990 with his college fraternity brother, Tom Rosenberg, who now has his own successful film company, Lakeshore Entertainment, which won an Academy Award for Best Picture for Million Dollar Baby.

Bernstein was also a partner with Charlie Lyons and the Ascent Entertainment Group which owned the Denver Nuggets, Colorado Avalanche, On-Command and Spectravision.

Other films produced by Bernstein and Beacon Pictures include The Commitments, A Midnight Clear, A Thousand Acres, Sugar Hill, Playing God, Princess Caraboo, The Road to Wellville and A Life in the Theatre, which won a cable ACE Award for Best Drama.

Armyan was born and raised in Chicago, and attended the University of Wisconsin. He was a broadcast journalist with PBS and then with ABC. He wrote the disco film Thank God It's Friday. He then wrote and co-produced Francis Ford Coppola's One from the Heart. Bernstein made his directing debut with Windy City, from his screenplay, which starred John Shea and Kate Capshaw. He also co-wrote and directed Cross My Heart, starring Martin Short and Annette O'Toole. He also wrote and produced ABC's Emmy Award–winning The Earth Day Special.

== Personal life ==
Armyan Bernstein was born into a Jewish family, the youngest of Lynne and Armand Bernstein's two children. He is married to Christine Meleo.

== Filmography ==
=== Film ===
Year	Title	Director	Writer	Producer	Notes
1978	Thank God It's Friday		Yes		
1982	One from the Heart		Yes	Co-producer	
1984	Windy City	Yes	Yes		Directorial debut
1987	Cross My Heart	Yes	Yes		
1999	The Hurricane		Yes	Yes	
2015	Grey Lady		Story	Yes	

Producer only

Title	Year	Notes
The Road to Wellville	1994	
364 Girls a Year	1996	
Air Force One	1997	
Disturbing Behavior	1998	
For Love of the Game	1999	
End of Days	1999	
Thirteen Days	2000	
A Lot Like Love	2005	
Firewall	2006	
Mardi Gras: Spring Break	2011	Limited release

Executive producer only

Title	Year	Notes
Satisfaction	1988	
The Commitments	1991	
A Midnight Clear	1992	
Sugar Hill	1993	
Princess Caraboo	1994	
The Baby-Sitters Club	1995	
A Thousand Acres	1997	
Playing God	1997	
Bring It On	2000	
The Family Man	2000	
Spy Game	2001	
Tuck Everlasting	2002	
The Emperor's Club	2002	
Open Range	2003	
Bring It On: Again	2004	Direct-to-video film
Dawn of the Dead	2004	
Ladder 49	2004	
Bring It On: All or Nothing	2006	Direct-to-video film
Children of Men	2006	
Pu-239	2006	
The Guardian	2006	
Let's Go to Prison	2006	
Bring It On: In It to Win It	2007	Direct-to-video film
Ny-Lon	2008	Unsold television pilot
Bring It On: Fight to the Finish	2009	Direct-to-video film
Bring It On: Worldwide Cheersmack	2017	Direct-to-video film
Dreadspace	2017	Short film

=== Television ===
Year	Title	Director	Writer	Producer	Notes
1976	Family		Yes		episode: "Monday Is Forever"
1990	The Earth Day Special		Yes	Executive	Television special
2003	Naked Hotel		Yes	Yes	Television film
2009-16	Castle			Executive	171 episodes
2015	Agent X			Executive	9 episodes
