= The Phobic =

- Directed by: Margo Romero
- Written by: Matthew Reagan
- Produced by: Alex Ryan; Courtney Gains; Michael McPhillips
- Starring: Courtney Gains; Juliette Marquis; Eric Millegan; Silas Weir Mitchell
- Cinematography: David McGrory
- Edited by: Bob Joyce
- Music by: Edward Romero; Matthew Thies
- Distributed by: Alex Ryan Productions
- Release date: 2006
- Country: United States
- Language: English
- Budget: $1 million

The Phobic is a 2006 psychological thriller directed by Margo Romero and produced by Alex Ryan Productions, Inc.

== Cast ==
- Courtney Gains - Dr. Cecil Westlake
- Juliette Marquis - Isabella Gibbons
- Eric Millegan - Reed Jenkins
- Silas Weir Mitchell - Vladimir Narcijac
