= Eric Millegan =

American actor

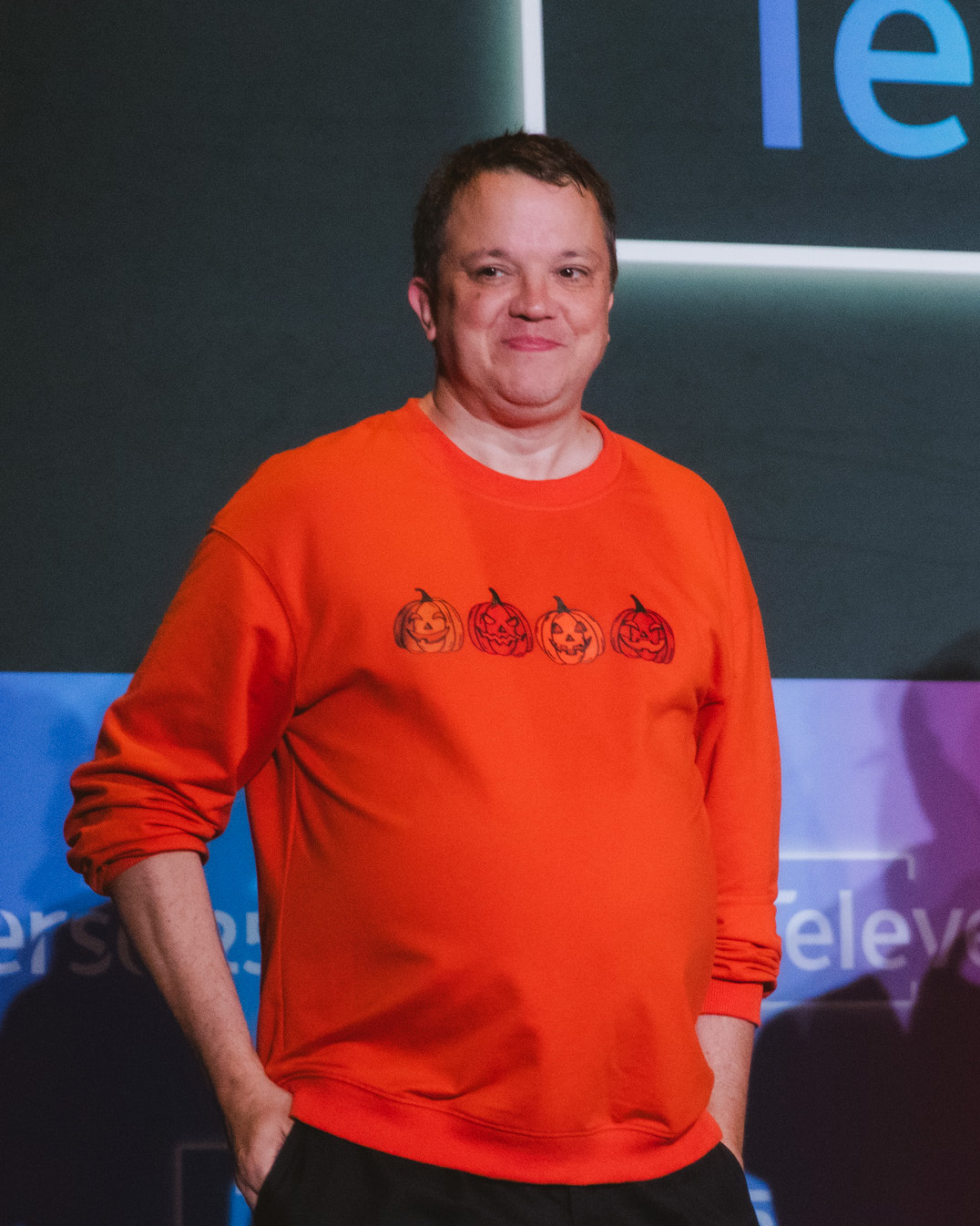
- Eric Millegan in 2025
- Born: August 25, 1974 (age 52); Hackettstown, New Jersey, U.S.
- Education: University of Michigan
- Occupation: Actor
- Years active: 2000–2017
- Spouse: Charles Michel (2012–present)

Eric Millegan (born August 25, 1974) is an American actor, best known for his role as Dr. Zack Addy on the Fox series Bones.

== Early life ==
Millegan was born in Hackettstown, New Jersey, and raised in Springfield, Oregon. He attended Springfield High School, where he was student body vice president his senior year. He studied acting at the Interlochen Arts Camp at the Interlochen Center for the Arts before studying musical theater at the University of Michigan, where he received a Bachelor of Fine Arts degree.

== Personal life ==
Millegan is gay. Out magazine named him the "Hottest Up-and-Coming Openly Gay Actor of 2003."

In March 2010, Millegan came out as having bipolar disorder in The Huffington Post.

Millegan married his long-time partner, Charles Michel, in New York City on June 28, 2012. He announced their union on Twitter.

On November 1, 2015, Millegan ran in the TCS New York City Marathon.

== Filmography ==
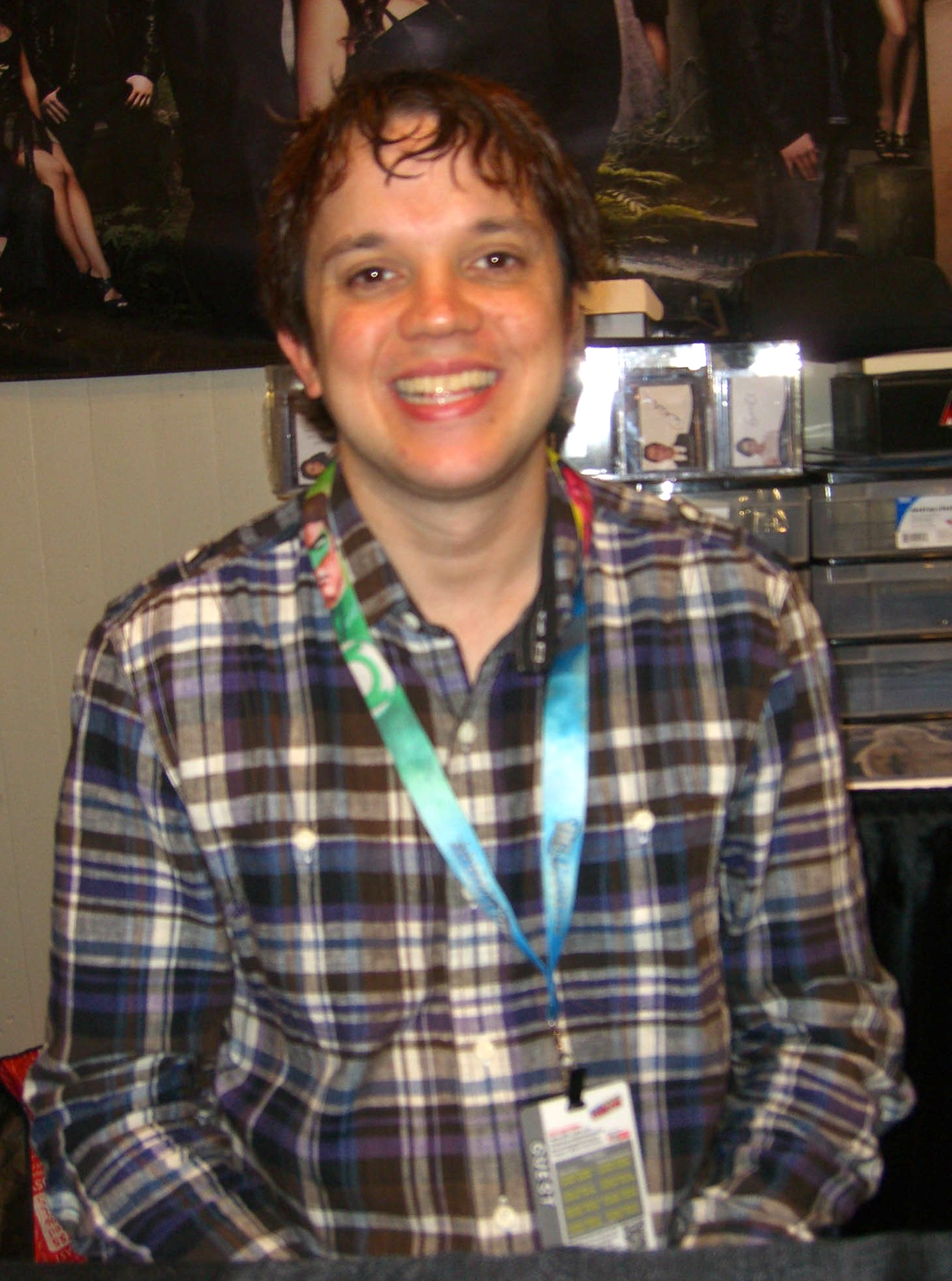
Millegan in 2012

=== Film ===
Year	Title	Role	Notes
2001	Soda Pop	Jamie	Short film
2002	On Line	Ed Simone	
2006	The Phobic	Reed Jenkins	
2014	Lady Peacock	Jerry	

=== Television ===
Year	Title	Role	Notes
2001	100 Centre Street	Michael Truskie	Episode: "Love Stories"
2002	Law & Order: Criminal Intent	Eddie Dutton	Episode: "The Insider"
2004	Curb Your Enthusiasm	Delivery boy	Episode: "Opening Night"
2005–2008; 2010; 2016–2017	Bones	Dr. Zack Addy	63 episodes

=== Theatre ===
Year	Title	Role	Notes
2000	Jesus Christ Superstar	Apostle	
