= King Cobra (1999 film) =

- DVD cover
- Directed by: David Hillenbrand; Scott Hillenbrand
- Written by: David Hillenbrand; Scott Hillenbrand; Guy Stodel
- Produced by: David Hillenbrand; Scott Hillenbrand
- Starring: Pat Morita; Scott Hillenbrand; Hoyt Axton; Joseph Ruskin; Courtney Gains
- Cinematography: Philip D. Schwartz
- Edited by: Guy W. Cearley
- Music by: David Hillenbrand
- Production company: Trimark Pictures
- Distributed by: Trimark Pictures; BMG Video
- Release date: April 27, 1999
- Running time: 93 minutes
- Country: United States
- Language: English

King Cobra is a 1999 comedy-horror/sci-fi film directed by Scott Hillenbrand and David Hillenbrand with featured special effects by The Chiodo Brothers. Starring Pat Morita, Scott Hillenbrand, Hoyt Axton, Joseph Ruskin, and Courtney Gains, the film was released direct to video by Trimark Pictures on April 27, 1999.

In the film, an experiment with snake venom goes wrong and a giant, genetically engineered hybrid of an Asian King Cobra and an Eastern Diamondback Rattlesnake escapes from his lab and into a small town. When snake-bitten bodies turn up everywhere, the mayor of the town wants things hushed up to protect the town's upcoming microbrewery festival. Expert reptile wrangler Nick Hashimoto (Morita) is then hired to bring in the snake before things spiral out of control.

== Plot ==
At a top-secret genetics laboratory near a small town, Dr. Irwin Burns is leading a genetic experiment to create an aggressive hybrid predator. By combining the genetics of an "African" King Cobra (Note: The film refers to the snake as an "African King Cobra". However, King Cobras have never inhabited the African continent. They live only in South and Southeast Asia. The only Cobras that live in Africa are the Forest cobra, also called the "Black cobra", but they are not king cobras, which belong to their own genus.) and an Eastern Diamondback Rattlesnake, his team successfully breeds a 30 ft (9.1 m) long hybrid snake nicknamed "Seth." However, Dr. Burns' ambitious assistant, Dr. Joseph McConnell, grows impatient with the slow pace of the project, and injects himself with an experimental serotonin-based aggression serum. Because of the drug's effects, McConnell convinces another lab worker, Toshi, to help him take over the project. They lock Dr. Burns out of the primary testing area and begin haphazardly mixing highly volatile chemicals. The mixture triggers a massive chemical explosion, instantly killing McConnell and Toshi. The blast shatters the reinforced glass of Seth’s containment unit, and the giant, highly aggressive snake slips out of the burning wreckage and escapes into the surrounding forest.

Two years pass. Seth has grown even larger and is now lurking in the woods outside the quiet, rural town of Filmore. The town is preparing for its annual lager festival, which is crucial for the local economy. The peace is shattered when the giant snake outgrows his woodland prey and begins hunting the town's residents. It viciously attacks and kills local teenagers, campers, and townspeople who venture near the woods. The gruesome, mutilated bodies puzzle the town physician, Dr. Brad Kagen, who examines the remains and realizes that the massive puncture wounds and extreme envenomation do not match any known local wildlife. He teams up with the local town Police Chief, Jo Biddle, to investigate the bizarre deaths. Biddle wants to cancel the upcoming festival to protect the town, but the corrupt Mayor, Ed Lowry, refuses. The mayor fears the financial ruin of the town and demands the killings be kept quiet.

Realizing they are dealing with an unprecedented threat, Dr. Kagen contacts outside experts. Dr. Irwin Burns, who survived the initial lab explosion and has been secretly tracking the loose specimen for two years, arrives in Filmore. He hides his true involvement in creating the beast, but warns the townspeople that they are dealing with an incredibly intelligent, fast, and aggressive hybrid snake. Soon after, Nick "Hash" Hashimoto arrives. Hash is a eccentric, world-renowned snake hunter and herpetologist who tracks aggressive reptiles using traditional and highly dangerous methods.

Hash, Dr. Burns, and Dr. Kagen track the giant snake into the forest. Hash attempts to wrestle the snake and capture it, but the massive weight and constriction power of Seth overwhelm him. Hash is bitten multiple times, and dies from Seth's venom. Dr. Kagen and Biddle trap the snake in a long tube that they fill with poisonous gas, apparently suffocating it. Kagen, Biddle and Burns return to their normal lives, with Kagen and Biddle having started a relationship, and Burns explains to them that a helicopter will arrive to pick up Seth's carcass. However, as the helicopter approaches, it is revealed that the gas canisters were actually sleeping gas, (Note: Hash using sleeping gas to "put Seth to sleep forever" makes total sense, because overdosing on anesthetic is just as lethal as poison gas. However, since the tube wasn't properly sealed, and a lethal dose could have become a survivable one.) and because there were holes pierced into the tube, Seth is alive and well.

== Cast ==
- Pat Morita as Nick "Hash" Hashimoto
- Scott Hillenbrand as Dr. Brad Kagen (as Scott Brandon)
- Hoyt Axton as Mayor Ed Biddle
- Joseph Ruskin as Dr. Irwin Burns
- Courtney Gains as Dr. Joseph McConnell
- Eric Lawson as Sheriff Ben Lowry
- Erik Estrada as Bernie Alvarez
- Nick Jameson as Jurgen Werner
- Megan Blake as Grace Stills
- Casey Fallo as Jo Biddle (as Kasey Fallo)
- Arell Blanton as Jesse
- Jerry Kernion as Conrad
- Michael Leopard as Buck
- Cedric Duplechain as Deputy Bud Fuller
- Paul Morgan Fredrix as Dr. Pat Kagen

== Development ==
When David Hillenbrand and Scott Hillenbrand developed the concept for King Cobra, the film Anaconda was not yet "in the pipeline". They wished to take an approach in the genre in a similar vein as Jaws or Alien. Production problems allowed Anaconda to beat their film to release.

== Reception ==
In 2001, G. Noel Gross of DVD Talk wrote that the snake effects of King Cobra were "better than the CGI-addled Python that followed" and made note of a "hilarious cameo" appearance by Erik Estrada. Derek Armstrong of Allmovie panned the film, calling it poorly conceived and absurd, with the special effects of the snake "so cheap-looking that it can only be seen in flashes". DVD Verdict also panned the film, writing that what was promoted as "30 Feet Of Pure Terror!", was "more like 93 minutes of pure boredom". While noting that Trimark gave the film a nice treatment on its DVD release, they concluded that it was "an incredibly worthless film".

== Release ==
It was released on DVD and VHS. Both have since been discontinued and have for long gone out of print. It is available to view on Vudu, Hulu, Amazon Prime Video, and YouTube by LionsgateVOD. It is also available for Google play and iTunes in some countries.

== See also ==
- List of killer snake films
