= Bad Reputation (2007 film) =

- DVD released by Maverick Entertainment Group
- Directed by: Jim Hemphill
- Written by: Jim Hemphill
- Screenplay by: Jim Hemphill
- Produced by: T.W. Porrill; Christopher Landers
- Starring: Chris Basler; Danielle Noble; Mark Kunzman; Kristina Conzen; Dakota Ferreiro; Jerad Anderson; Angelique Hennessey
- Cinematography: Forrest Allison
- Edited by: Gordon Stuart
- Music by: John LeBec; Eric Choronzy
- Production company: Winning Edge Partners
- Distributed by: Maverick Entertainment Group
- Release date: August 8, 2007
- Running time: 90 minutes
- Country: United States
- Language: English

Bad Reputation is a 2007 American slasher film written and directed by Jim Hemphill.

== Plot ==
Michelle Rosen, an introverted and insecure high school student, is approached at lunch by popular jock Aaron Cussler, who invites Michelle to a party he is throwing. Charmed by Aaron, Michelle goes to the gathering, where she makes out with Aaron (to the annoyance of Aaron's occasional girlfriend Debbie) and befriends another student named Wendy, a formerly overweight outcast who is now a member of Debbie and Aaron's clique. As the night progresses, Aaron and two of his friends, Steve (Wendy's boyfriend) and Jake, get Michelle drunk, and slip her a roofie. Aaron and Jake then rape Michelle (at one point violating her with a bottle) in a bedroom while Steve, who had grown reluctant, restrains her. Afterward, the boys' girlfriends find the unconscious Michelle, and convinced by Aaron that Michelle was the aggressor, Debbie uses packing tape to tie Michelle to a tree in the backyard, after writing "Slut" and "Ho" on her. The only one who tries to aid Michelle is Wendy, but she is made to back off by Jake's girlfriend Heather, under threat of being made a pariah. Michelle eventually frees herself and goes home, where she engenders no sympathy from her emotionally abusive mother.

Rumors of Michelle's supposed promiscuity spread, and she is tormented at school, where she receives no aid from the facility's apathetic counselor, who passive-aggressively blames her for the bullying she is experiencing. Michelle snaps, and begins acting and dressing provocatively, seducing Steve one day after school. Michelle has Steve drive to a secluded area, where she stabs and castrates him, then stages the scene to make it appear that he was gay, and the victim of a homophobic hate crime. Later, Michelle lures Jake to her apartment, where she ties him up (under the pretense of engaging in kinky sex) and tortures, bludgeons, and dismembers him.

The next night, Aaron hosts a Halloween party at his house, which Michelle sneaks into, dressed as Jason Voorhees. Michelle slips roofies into all of the drinks, then goes upstairs, where Aaron is cheating on Debbie with Heather. When Aaron leaves the bedroom, Michelle decapitates Heather with a machete, and takes her costume, using it to get close to Debbie, who she drowns in a filth-filled toilet. Michelle then seduces Aaron, leads him to a bedroom, confesses to murdering his friends, and kills him by biting his penis off and slitting his throat. Wendy, who has been outside, returns to the party, where everyone has passed out due to the drugs Michelle had given them. Michelle attacks Wendy, screaming, "Yeah, you tried to stop them, until you thought it might threaten your spot on the pep squad! God, you're the worst of all of them! You knew it was wrong, and you didn't do a goddamn thing to stop it!" In the struggle that ensues, Wendy stabs Michelle, who dies with the sobbing and remorseful Wendy holding her hand.

== Cast ==
- Angelique Hennessy as Michelle Rosen
- Jerad Anderson as Aaron Cussler
- Danielle Noble as Wendy
- Kristina Conzen as Heather
- Dakota Ferreiro as Debbie Mitchell
- Mark Kunzman as Jake Stife
- Chris Basler as Steve
- T.W. Porrill as Counselor Wiederhorn
- Elizabeth Kirven as Detective Stephanie Rothman
- Sean A. Mulvihill as Scott Marks
- Mimi Marie as Ms. Rosen
- Jennifer Holloway as Carol Johnson
- Jessica Stamen as Alana Maxwell
- Jeff Kueppers as Birdman
- John Knapp as Baxter Wolfe
- Jim Hemphill as Mean Kid on Answering Machine

== Reception ==
In a review for Arrow in the Head, Ammon Gilbert gave Bad Reputation a 3/4, and wrote, "For a movie with a small budget, this puppy hit hard with tension, suspense and best of all- it presented a group of characters that you actually cared about- they were all well developed, and for that I thank them. The only downside I could come up with was some pacing issues throughout (parts seemed to drag...) and the ending blew donkey balls (at least for me)". Bloody Disgusting awarded a 3/5, and concluded, "Bad Reputation is a smarter teen slasher movie but not on par with the truly dark rape/revenge films it wanted to emulate. Still for a first-time film, writer/director Hemphill doesn't 'dumb down' the story. Not a bad entry into the horror/slasher genre". The film was also praised by DW Bostaph Jr. of Dread Central, who gave it a 3½ out 5. A 2/5 was awarded by J.R. McNamara of Digital Retribution, who criticized the poor production values, pacing problems, and awkward dialogue, opining, "I don't think that anyone should avoid this film, but don't strain yourself seeking it out either". In 2018 a special edition Blu-ray was released featuring commentary by Hemphill and film scholar Alexandra Heller-Nicholas.

== See also ==
- List of films set around Halloween
