= Agent X (TV series) =

2015 American TV series

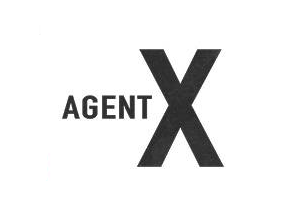
- Genre: Action drama
- Created by: William Blake Herron
- Starring: Sharon Stone; Jeff Hephner; Jamey Sheridan; John Shea; Mike Colter; Gerald McRaney
- Country of origin: United States
- Original language: English
- No. of seasons: 1
- No. of episodes: 10

Production
- Executive producers: Armyan Bernstein; Sharon Stone; William Blake Herron
- Producer: 135k
- Production location: NA
- Production companies: TNT Original Productions; Beacon Pictures

Original release
- Network: TNT
- Release: November 8 – December 27, 2015

Agent X is an American action drama television series which aired from November 8 to December 27, 2015, on TNT. It stars Sharon Stone, Jeff Hephner, Jamey Sheridan, John Shea and Mike Colter.

On December 15, 2015, TNT canceled the series after one season.

== Plot ==
After becoming United States vice president, Natalie Maccabee is informed that there is a secret paragraph in the U.S. Constitution creating a special agent to help protect the country in times of crisis, under instruction of the vice president. John Case, former Special Forces operator, is the current operative "Agent X", who handles sensitive cases that the CIA and the FBI cannot.

== Cast ==
- Sharon Stone as Vice President Natalie Maccabee
- Jeff Hephner as John Case
- Jamey Sheridan as Edwin Stanton
- John Shea as President Thomas Eckhart
- Mike Colter as Miles Lathem
- Gerald McRaney as Malcolm Millar
- Olga Fonda as Olga Petrovka
- James Earl Jones as Chief Justice of the United States Caleb Thorne
- Andrew Howard as Nicolas Volker / Raymond Marks

== Episodes ==
No.	Title	Directed by	Written by	Original release date	US viewers (millions)
1	"Pilot"	Peter O'Fallon	William Blake Herron	November 8, 2015	1.28
The Vice President of the United States discovers her true responsibilities: to oversee an agent, John Case, with a license to kill.
2	"The Enemy of My Enemy"	Peter O'Fallon	William Blake Herron	November 8, 2015	1.01
John and Olga work together to stop nuclear weapons from ending up in the wrong hands.
3	"Back in Your Arms"	Peter O'Fallon	Robert Port	November 15, 2015	1.03
John uncovers a secret conspiracy involving a shadow government subverting Executive authority.
4	"The Devil and John Case"	Félix Enríquez Alcalá	Steven Kriozere & Mark A. Altman	November 22, 2015	1.03
John travels to Mexico to demolish (the myth of) El Diablo.
5	"Truth, Lies, and Consequences"	Kevin Bray	Jesse Alexander	November 29, 2015	0.98
John cuts short a bioterrorism plot seconds before it explodes over the National Mall, almost losing his own life.
6	"The Sacrifice"	Ute Briesewitz	Samantha Stratton	December 6, 2015	0.99
A former Agent X (Fred Dryer) thought to be dead threatens the lives of John, the Vice President, and a treaty that she is trying to facilitate.
7	"The Long Walk Home"	Jeff Wadlow	Robert Port	December 13, 2015	1.15
John manages to gain the upper hand, as he uncovers a few skeletons from the Agent X program that culminates in the President of the United States being shot.
8	"Angels & Demons"	John Terlesky	Steven Kriozere & Mark A. Altman and Anslem Richardson	December 20, 2015	1.21
As the President struggles to stay alive and ward off further attacks, Agent X and his colleagues continue to be played by the Cabal.
9	"Penultimatum"	Rod Holcomb	Jesse Alexander	December 27, 2015	1.22
John's fiancée Pamela (Carolyn Stotesbery) is kidnapped by Raymond to coerce John but ends up being rescued by Malcolm, John's handler.
10	"Fidelity"	Peter O'Fallon	William Blake Herron	December 27, 2015	1.12
Raymond orchestrates a prisoner's dilemma-scenario between the world leaders, but John, Olga, and Malcolm work together to bring him down.

== Production ==
Agent X was produced by TNT Originals in association with Beacon Pictures. Armyan Bernstein and Sharon Stone are executive producers. William Blake Herron, who also executive-produced, wrote the pilot, which was directed by Peter O'Fallon.

== Critical reception ==
On the review aggregator website Rotten Tomatoes, 27% of 22 critics' reviews are positive, with an average rating of 5.0/10. The website's consensus reads: "Unintentionally hilarious, poorly paced, and overall redundant, Agent X is a secret agent drama that should have remained secret." Metacritic, which uses a weighted average, assigned the film a score of 43 out of 100, based on 15 critics, indicating "mixed or average" reviews.

The New York Times said in a review of the series: "Without the jokey bravado (or high production values) of Strike Back or the charming wonkiness of Warehouse 13, the only claim Agent X has on our attention is Ms. Stone. Even that is tenuous — while her performance loosens up a bit across the first four episodes, her screen time appears to shrink."

Variety wrote in their review "Possessing some of the flavor of National Treasure, Agent X takes the amusing step of investing the Vice President's office with secret constitutional powers, all for the purpose of concocting a Yankee version of James Bond. And wonder of wonders, it mostly works, at least initially, combining a sense of playfulness with bountiful action and, less successfully, a sweeping conspiracy.

The Wall Street Journal called Agent X an "improbable but high-action thriller." Also saying "This light and fast-moving version of an America-in-peril espionage thriller doesn't really deal in moral ambiguity and shades of gray."
