= Windy City (film) =

1984 American dramatic film directed by Armyan Bernstein

- Theatrical release poster
- Directed by: Armyan Bernstein
- Written by: Armyan Bernstein
- Produced by: Alan Greisman
- Starring: John Shea; Kate Capshaw; Josh Mostel
- Cinematography: Reynaldo Villalobos
- Edited by: Clifford Jones
- Music by: Jack Nitzsche
- Production company: CBS Theatrical Films
- Distributed by: Warner Bros. Pictures
- Release date: September 21, 1984
- Running time: 103 minutes
- Country: United States
- Language: English
- Box office: $343,890

Windy City is a 1984 American comedy drama film written and directed by Armyan Bernstein in his directorial debut, and starring Kate Capshaw, Josh Mostel and John Shea. It was theatrically released on September 21, 1984, and was a critical and commercial failure.

== Plot ==
Danny Morgan, a writer living in Chicago, feels his world crashing down around him. His former girlfriend, Emily, is about to get married. His close childhood friend, Sol, has leukemia. Danny reflects on his past relationship with Emily while also trying to give Sol the send-off he deserves.

Danny pitches the idea of a sailing trip to their group of friends. This plan refers back to their childhood fantasies of being adventurers and pirates. However, Danny's friends have obligations and claim they are unable to just take off.

Despite a clandestine kiss with Emily at a dance club, Danny is unable to persuade her to take him back. On the day of Emily's wedding, he runs to stop her but is blocked by a rising drawbridge. He tries to jump the gap between the bridge's two halves, but falls short and lands in the river below. He arrives too late to stop the wedding ceremony.

Danny and Sol's friends throw caution to the wind and pitch in to make the sailing trip happen. As they all sail away from the harbor, Sol thanks Danny. In voice over, Danny reveals Sol died on the evening of the trip's ninth day.

Years later, Danny runs into Emily, who is now divorced. The two of them go to a park, talk and hint at a possible reconciliation.

== Cast ==
- John Shea as Danny Morgan
- Kate Capshaw as Emily Reubens
- Josh Mostel as Sol
- Jim Borrelli as Mickey
- Jeffrey DeMunn as Bobby
- Eric Pierpoint as Pete
- Lewis J. Stadlen as Marty
- James Sutorius as Eddy
- Niles McMaster as Michael
- Lisa Taylor as Sherry
- Nathan Davis as Mr. Jones
- Louie Lanciloti as Ernesto
- Wilbert Bradley as Joe the Janitor

== Production ==
Armyan Bernstein developed the film, under its original title All the Sad Young Men, at The Ladd Company until it was put into turnaround and was acquired by CBS Theatrical Films. Following disappointments with how his prior screenplays Thank God It's Friday and One from the Heart turned out, Bernstein opted to direct the script himself in what would be his directorial debut. The movie was shot on location in Chicago.

== Reception ==
The film was widely panned by critics. Janet Maslin of The New York Times wrote a negative review of Windy City saying of the film "The romance is entirely pat; as for the old-gang-of-mine gatherings, when Danny compares them to a beer commercial, he's not far off the mark." Audiences polled by CinemaScore gave the film an average grade of "B-" on an A+ to F scale. On Rotten Tomatoes, the film holds a 14% rating based on 7 reviews.
