= Carolyn Stotesbery =

American former actress, model (active 1999–2017)

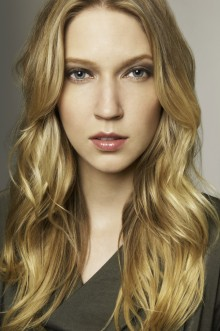
- Carolyn Stotesbery (2012)
- Born: Carolyn Marie Stotesbery; Minneapolis, Minnesota
- Occupations: Actress, model
- Years active: 1999–2017
- Spouse: Philip Levens (m. 2019)

Carolyn Stotesbery-Levens (née Stotesbery) is an American former actress and model possibly best known for portraying the character Pamela Richardson on the short-lived TNT drama Agent X. She is credited as Carolyn Stotes for her early film and television appearances.

== Early life ==
Stotesbery was born in Wayzata, a suburb of Minneapolis, Minnesota, where she lived part-time as well as spending summers on a cattle ranch in Big Timber, Montana. She is the daughter of Anne and Patrick Stotesbery. Her father was a cattle rancher, but moved the family to the Napa Valley to start Ladera Vineyards.

Stotesbery is the youngest of 4 children; she has an older brother, Dan, and 2 older sisters, Nicole and Laura. Stotesbery attended grade school in Wayzata before transferring to the Breck School, where she appeared in high school plays and musicals.

She began acting at the age of 5, and at the age of 8 became a part of the Children's Theater of Minneapolis. she studied Shakespeare at Cambridge University in England, and New York University (NYU) Tisch Stella Adler Conservatory, as well as Theater at USC.

Stotesbery is an Improv Olympic West Alumni and a member of UCB. She also spent time at the Second City Training Center and The Groundlings.

== Acting career ==
In 2003, Stotesbery made her first film appearance with a small role in the Farrelly brothers' Stuck On You. Before that she had appeared on MTV's comedy series Undressed.

Stotesbery appeared in the pilot for Cracking Up, portrayed a Holocaust survivor in an episode of Cold Case, and appeared in the independent film Bobby, directed by Emilio Estevez.

In the 2010s, Stotesbery appeared in the series Glory Daze and Treasure of the Black Jaguar, as well as the independent film Crosshairs directed by Nick Lentz. She was in the main cast of the series Olympia, and reunited with director Nick Lentz to star in the nine minute comedy short film Cupcakes. Stotesbery also starred in the dramatic short film Cold Feet and starred with Gilles Duarte as the couple in the music video for Adele's 2011 album track Don't You Remember.

In 2015, Stotesbery played the role of Pamela Richardson in three episodes of the short-lived series Agent X, as the fiancé of the title character, played by Jeff Hephner. That same year, Stotesbery made her final film appearance, the direct to video Grey Lady, directed by fellow Agent X actor John Shea, which was completed in 2015 and released in mid-2017.

In 2019 she and her screenwriter husband, Philip Levens, were hired to write a potential television series, Menace of Venice, for Todd Garner's Broken Road Productions, but no such series has gone into production.

== Modeling ==
As a freshman in high school, Stotesbery was chosen 1 out of 400 girls in the Ford Modeling search to represent Beauty in the Midwest. Stotesbery was selected to go to New York and featured on CBS after which, Ford placed her in Chicago where at 15 she lived on her own working as a model. She has shot with top photographers Ellen Von Unwerth, Odette Sugerman, Jill Greenberg, Jeremy Goldberg, Peggy Sirota, Andrew Southam, Bonnie Holland, and Jason Nocito, appearing in such magazines as Italian Vogue, Rolling Stone, Glamour, and Allure.

== Personal life ==
Stotesbery married screenwriter Philip Levens in 2019. The couple lives in Los Angeles.

== Filmography ==
| Year | Title | Role | Notes |
|---|---|---|---|
| 2003 | Stuck on You | Supporting | credited as Carolyn Stotes |
| 2006 | Bobby | | uncredited |
| 2010 | Treasure of the Black Jaguar | Gabriella | credited as Carolyn Stotes |
| 2012 | Crosshairs | Christine | credited as Carolyn Stotes |
| 2012 | The Advocate | Susan | |
| 2012 | Cold Feet | Sophie | Short film |
| 2013 | Cupcakes | Gwen | Short film |
| 2014 | Strangehold | Madeline | |
| 2014 | Love & Mercy | Sarah | |
| 2017 | Grey Lady | Eli | Direct to video |

== Television ==
| Year | Title | Role | Notes |
|---|---|---|---|
| 2001 | Undressed | Dawn | 1 episode; credited as Carolyn Stotes |
| 2004 | Cracking Up | girl #1 | 1 episode, credited as Carolyn Stotes |
| 2006 | Cold Case | Guest Star: Johanna Hoffman | credited as Carolyn Stotes |
| 2010 | Glory Daze | Carol | 1 episode |
| 2012 | Olympia | Dakota Aubrey | Main cast |
| 2015 | Agent X | Pamela Richardson | Recurring role |
| 2016 | Castle | Genevieve | 1 episode |

== Theatre credits ==
| Year | Production | Role | Theatre |
|---|---|---|---|
| | The Glory of Living | Sarah | El Centro Theater |
| | East Berlin | Sarah | NoHo Arts |
| | A Midsummer Night's Dream | Oberon | Cambridge Summer Program |
| 2013 | Carry The World | Eastern European Role | Imagine Life Theatre |
