= Philip Levens =

American screenwriter and television producer

Philip Levens is an American screenwriter and television producer known for creating the science-fiction TV mini-series Ascension.

== Education and career ==
Levens grew up in Lubbock, Texas and attended The University of Texas at Austin. He initially wrote and produced on UPN's All Souls, The CW's Smallville, CBS's Wolf Lake, and Fox's Night Visions.

In 2000, Levens sold his one-hour dramedy "Red Shift" to UPN and rewrote "Old City" for Jan de Bont. Philip also sold "Red Queen" for ABC, "Finders/Keepers" for USA, "Nightwatch" for Fox, and adapted the graphic novel Rest for NBC.

Levens was writing a screenplay draft for the "WonderWoman" feature film until he was replaced by Laeta Kalogridis in 2003.

In 2006, he wrote and executive produced the series South Beach for UPN, along with Jennifer Lopez. He subsequently wrote for NBC's Knight Rider, R. L. Stine's The Haunting Hour: The Series.

In 2014, Levens created and was the showrunner of the limited series Ascension for SyFy, inspired by the real-life Project Orion (nuclear propulsion).

Levens also wrote "The Accused" for A&E (TV channel), and two projects for CBS, "Interest of Justice" and "The Case Runner".

He and his wife, Carolyn Stotesbery-Levens wrote "Menace of Venice" for Todd Garner's Broken Road Productions.

== Personal life ==
Philips is married to Carolyn Stotesbery and lives in Los Angeles. The wedding ceremony was held at Saint Helena Catholic Church.

== Filmography ==
Year	Film	Credit
2002	Smallville	Producer/writer
2006	South Beach	Producer/writer
2007	Hush Little Baby	Producer/writer
2008	Knight Rider	Producer/writer
2014	Ascension	Producer/writer
1999	The Puzzle	Writer
2001	All Souls	Writer
2002	Shadow Realm	Writer
2002	Night Visions	Writer
2006	South Beach	Writer
2007	Hush Little Baby	Writer
2011	R.L. Stine's The Haunting Hour	Writer
2001-02	Wolf Lake	executive story editor
