= Dead Reckoning (2020 film) =

- Digital release cover
- Directed by: Andrzej Bartkowiak
- Written by: Kristin Kuhns Alexandre; A. Wayne Carter
- Produced by: Mark Donadio; Miriam Marcus; Andrzej Bartkowiak; K. Jeffrey Bowler
- Starring: KJ Apa; India Eisley; Scott Adkins; James Remar
- Cinematography: Vern Nobles Jr.
- Edited by: Cody Miller
- Music by: Sean Murray
- Production companies: Pulse Rate Production; Moody Independent; Productivity Media; Motion Picture Exchange
- Distributed by: Shout! Studios
- Release date: November 13, 2020
- Running time: 91 minutes
- Country: United States
- Language: English

Dead Reckoning is a 2020 American action thriller film directed by Andrzej Bartkowiak. The film stars KJ Apa, India Eisley, Scott Adkins and James Remar. It was released on video on demand on November 13, 2020. The film was shot in 2016, under the original title Altar Rock.

== Plot ==
During a picturesque summer on the Nantucket coast, Niko and Tillie are living the dream of a summer romance. However, when Niko's terrorist brother comes to the United States, Niko must pit himself against his own family in order to protect the woman he loves and thousands of innocent people.

== Cast ==
- KJ Apa as Niko
- India Eisley as Tillie Gardner
- Scott Adkins as Marco
- James Remar as FBI Agent Richard Cantrell
- Ellie Cornell as Jennifer Crane
- Sydney Park as Felicity
- Brooks Bowden as Lew
- John Shea as FBI Agent Hanley
