= Kristin Kuhns Alexandre =

American journalist

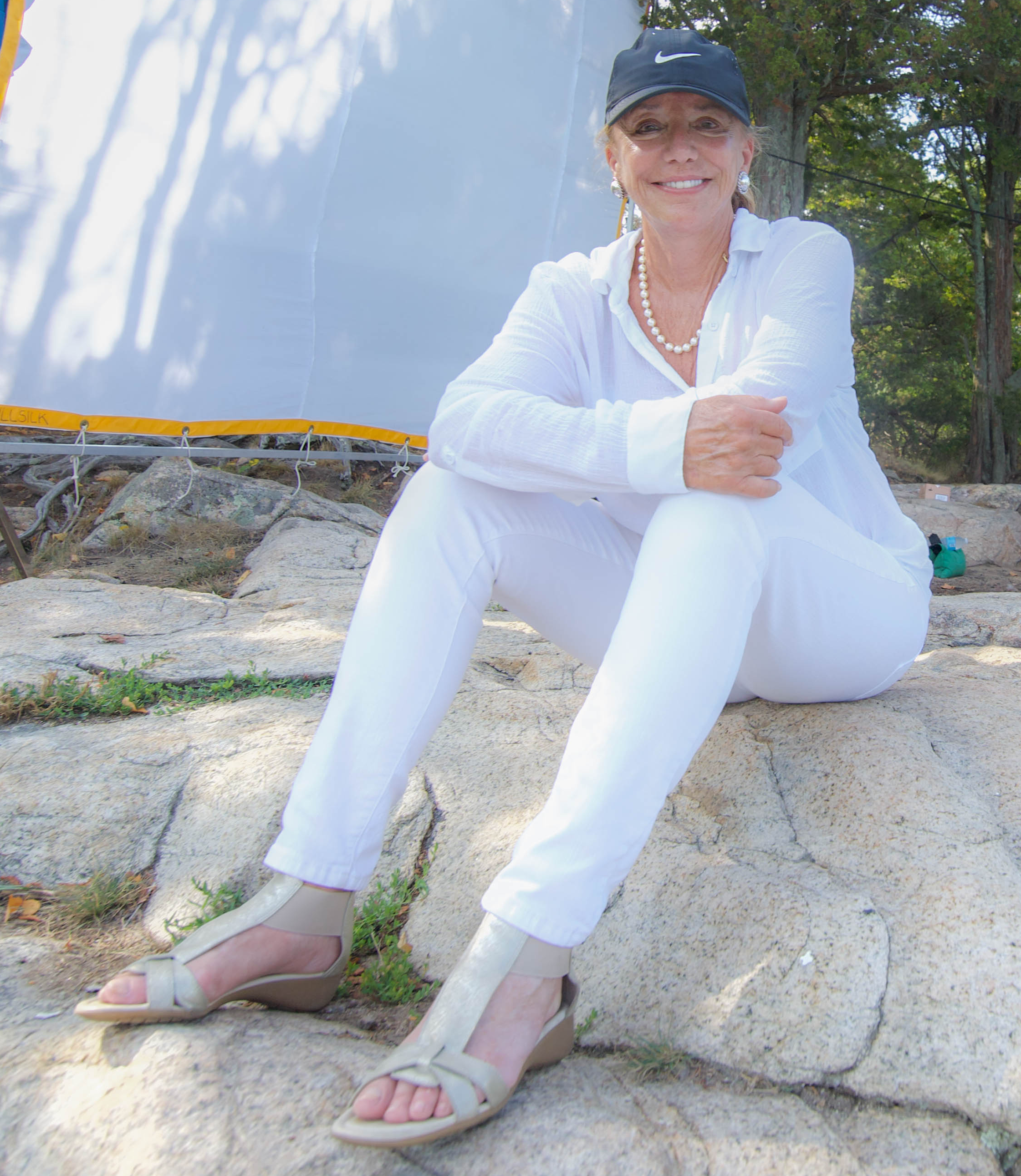
- Alexandre in 2016
- Born: Kristin Colgan Kuhns; July 15, 1948; Dayton, Ohio
- Died: September 12, 2021 (aged 73); Mendham, New Jersey, U.S.
- Education: Sweet Briar College
- Occupations: Journalist, screenwriter, producer
- Spouse(s): William Norris Hubbard; Richard Warren Gerrity; DeWitt Loomis Alexandre
- Children: 2 (+ 2 stepchildren)
- Writing career
- Notable works: Nuncio and the Gypsy Girl in the Gilded Age; Gem City Gypsy Find a Great Guy: Now and Forever The Perfect Gentleman: The Secrets Rich Girls Use To Choose The Classiest Guys

Kristin Kuhns Alexandre (born Kristin Colgan Kuhns; July 15, 1948 – September 12, 2021) was an American writer, journalist, author, screenwriter, and producer. She was a WGA screenwriter and executive producer for the action thriller, Dead Reckoning, directed by Andrzej Bartkowiak.

== Biography ==
Kristin Colgan Kuhns was born and raised in Dayton, Ohio, where her family has an extended history. She later left Dayton to attend and graduate from Sweet Briar College. Her graphic novel series, Nuncio and the Gypsy Girl, features Neci Stans, a Dayton gypsy princess whose love for Ezra Crawford, a Dayton aviator and composer, exposes her to danger.

From 1968 to 1978, she was married to William Norris Hubbard. Alexandre and her husband were among the group of organizers that headed up the New York City activities for the first Earth Day on April 22, 1970. She was the speaker coordinator for the NYC event.

Alexandre wed Richard Warren Gerrity in 1981. She remarried, to DeWitt Loomis Alexandre, an investment advisor.

== Career ==
Alexandre wrote feature stories for The Christian Science Monitor, Ingenue Magazine, Town & Country Magazine, and The New York Daily News. She wrote a weekly column called "The Young Slant" for The Dayton Journal Herald. Alexandre's first writing experience was with the Kettering-Oakwood Times when she documented her experiences with The Experiment in International Living through a series of columns she submitted while living in France.

She worked as a publicist for the advertising agency Ammirati Puris Lintas, the Puerto Rico Economic Development Administration, Rums of Puerto Rico and Sweet Briar College. She was editor of the corporate magazine for Champion International U.S. Plywood and C.I.T. Financial Corporation. she died of cancer in 2021.

In the early 1970s, Alexandre was a reporter on one episode of WNET's 51st State. She is also President of The Kuhns Investment Co. LLC, a small, privately held family investment company located in her native Dayton, Ohio.

Alexandre worked as a producer and writer for various film projects and was a featured writer on The Black List.

== Filmography ==
| Year | Title | Role | Notes |
|---|---|---|---|
| 2012 | Delivering the Goods | Co-Executive Producer | Film |
| 2013 | Dear Margaret | Associate Producer | Short |
| 2016 | Collected Kingdom | Executive Producer | Short |
| 2017 | Dead Reckoning / Altar Rock | Producer, writer | Film |
| 2017 | Grey Lady | Associate Producer | Film |

== Bibliography ==
- Varol, Ozan O. (2012). Nuncio and the Gypsy Girl in the Gilded Age. Oxford University Press. ISBN 978-0190626020.
- Alexandre, Kristin Kuhns (2013). Gem City Gyspy. Sisterhood Publications. ISBN 978-1940016023.
- Alexandre, Kristin Kuhns (2008). Find a Great Guy: Now and Forever. Runnymede Press. ISBN 978-0977668717.
- Alexandre, Kristin Kuhns (2007). The Perfect Gentleman: The Secrets Rich Girls Use To Choose The Classiest Guys. Runnymede Press. ISBN 978-0977668700.
