= For Love of the Game (film) =

- Theatrical release poster
- Directed by: Sam Raimi
- Screenplay by: Dana Stevens
- Based on: For Love of the Game by Michael Shaara
- Produced by: Armyan Bernstein; Amy Robinson
- Starring: Kevin Costner; Kelly Preston; John C. Reilly; Jena Malone; Brian Cox
- Cinematography: John Bailey
- Edited by: Eric L. Beason; Arthur Coburn
- Music by: Basil Poledouris
- Production companies: Beacon Pictures; Renaissance Pictures; Tig Productions
- Distributed by: Universal Pictures
- Release date: September 17, 1999
- Running time: 137 minutes
- Country: United States
- Language: English
- Budget: $50 million
- Box office: $46.1 million

For Love of the Game is a 1999 American sports drama film directed by Sam Raimi and written by Dana Stevens, based on Michael Shaara's 1991 novel. Starring Kevin Costner and Kelly Preston, it follows the perfect game performance of an aging star baseball pitcher as he deals with the pressures of pitching in Yankee Stadium in his final outing by calming himself with memories of a long-term relationship.

The play-by-play of the game is announced by longtime Brooklyn/Los Angeles Dodgers baseball broadcaster Vin Scully, who himself called four perfect games in his career, and Steve Lyons.

For Love of the Game was released by Universal Pictures on September 17, 1999. The film received mixed reviews from critics and was a box office bomb, grossing $46.1 million against a $50 million production budget. Costner received a nomination for the Golden Raspberry Award for Worst Actor.

== Plot ==
The Detroit Tigers travel to New York to play a season-ending series against the New York Yankees. At 63–97, the team has long since been eliminated from playoff contention and are playing for nothing but pride against the Yankees, who have a chance to clinch the American League East with a win.

In his Manhattan hotel suite, 40-year-old pitcher Billy Chapel awaits his girlfriend Jane Aubrey, but she doesn't show. Jane is a single mother with a teenage daughter Heather whom Billy got to know. The next morning, Billy is told by Tigers' owner Gary Wheeler that the team has been sold and that the new owners' first move will be to end Billy's 19-year tenure with the Tigers by trading him to the San Francisco Giants. Billy learns from Jane that she is leaving that same day to accept a job offer in London.

Billy is a famous and accomplished pitcher near the end of his career and he is recovering from a hand injury. Wheeler hints that Billy should consider retiring rather than join another team. As he goes to Yankee Stadium to make his last start of the year, Billy reflects about Jane, detailing how they met five years prior. These flashbacks are interspersed within the game, along with glimpses of Jane watching the game on a television at the airport.

As the game progresses, Billy dominates the Yankees' batters, often talking to himself on how to pitch each one. While in the dugout resting between innings, Billy reflects how he shut Jane out of his life after he suffered a career-threatening injury in the off-season. The pain of pitching intensifies as the game progresses.

Billy is so caught up in his thoughts that he does not realize he is pitching a perfect game until he looks at the scoreboard in the bottom of the eighth inning. Friend and catcher Gus Sinski confirms that no one has reached base, and that the whole team is rallying behind Billy to do whatever it takes to keep the perfect game bid alive. Billy's shoulder pain has become intense, and after he throws his first two pitches of the inning well out of the strike zone, Tigers manager Frank Perry makes the call to warm up two relief pitchers in the bullpen. The count goes to 3–0 before Billy recalls pitching to his father (now deceased) in the back yard. He rallies and throws a strike, then gets the batter out on the next pitch.

Before the Tigers take the field for the bottom of the ninth inning, Billy has final ruminations about his career and his love for Jane. He autographs a baseball for Wheeler, who has been like a father to him for many years. Along with a signature, Billy inscribes the ball with "Tell them I'm through. For love of the game." Ken Strout comes up representing the last chance for New York. Strout chops up the middle just out of the reach of Chapel, heading towards center field. The Tigers' shortstop dives and throws to first in time to retire Strout, giving Chapel his perfect game.

Billy sits alone in his hotel room as the realization sinks in that everything he has been and done for the past 19 years is over. Despite his amazing accomplishment, Billy weeps not only for the loss of baseball, but for the other love of his life, Jane.

The next morning, Billy goes to the airport to inquire about a flight for London. Jane had missed her flight the night before so she could watch the end of his perfect game. He finds her there waiting for her plane and they embrace and reconcile.

== Cast ==
- Kevin Costner as Billy Chapel
- Kelly Preston as Jane Aubrey
- John C. Reilly as Gus Sinski
- Jena Malone as Heather
- Brian Cox as Gary Wheeler
- JK Simmons as Frank Perry
- Joe Lisi as Pete

In addition, playing themselves, are television sportscasters Vin Scully and Steve Lyons, as well as Yankee's stadium announcer Bob Sheppard.

The pitching coach who prepared Costner for this role was Mike Buddie, a former middle reliever for the Yankees and Milwaukee Brewers. Buddie also had a small speaking role in the film as the character Jack Spellman, the starting pitcher for the Yankees. The Yankees manager is played by Augie Garrido, then head coach of the University of Texas Longhorns. Garrido was previously head baseball coach of California State University Fullerton, which is Costner's alma mater.

== Production ==
Sydney Pollack was originally slated as the director, with Tom Cruise cast in the part of Billy Chapel. Armyan Bernstein, chief of Beacon Pictures, got Kevin Costner interested in the film. The studio wanted to keep the film's budget to $50 million, so Costner helped out by waiving his usual $20 million salary in exchange for a bigger percentage of the film's gross; Costner was also given the generous rights of final cut privilege (normally only given to the producer or director, if anyone) and director approval.

Director Sam Raimi, who had previously only done low-budget films, later explained why he agreed to take on the big budget project: "I was simply moved by the screenplay. It was moving and simple and I love baseball. I love baseball and I thought it hadn't really been put on film and I wanted to see it on the wide screen format. I thought that would be exciting for the audience, like being at a game. I get so excited by some baseball games I wanted to see if I could put some of that into the picture. And I simply liked it and wanted to try something different."

The actor playing Billy Chapel as a child in the opening credits is also Costner; the footage is actually old home movies of Costner and his father. J. K. Simmons later joked about the fact that he was only nine days older than Costner, despite being cast as a 63-year-old.

During post-production, a handful of lines (amounting to roughly 10 seconds of film) were edited or cut in order to prevent the film being given an "R" rating under the Motion Picture Association of America film rating system. Costner objected to the edits but was overruled by Universal Pictures, and his contract specified that he only had final cut privilege so long as the film was rated "PG-13" and had a running time of less than 2 hours, 10 minutes. A week before the film was to hit theatres, he voiced his complaints in a Newsweek interview, a breach of professional etiquette when speaking about a current film that one appears in. Universal Pictures co-chairman Stacey Snider, while agreeing with Costner that the cuts the Motion Picture Association demanded were unjust, stated, "Kevin's not the director and it's not fair for him to hijack a $50-million asset. I realize this is very much about principle for Kevin, but principle doesn't mean that you never compromise. Our feeling is that we have backed the filmmaker and his name is Sam Raimi, not Kevin Costner." Raimi, while supporting Universal's decision and agreeing that a "PG-13" rating was a necessity, said he sympathized with Costner's feelings and wished the lines could have been kept in without losing the "PG-13" rating. Universal compromised with Costner on the length, allowing a final cut of 2 hours, 17 minutes. Recognizing that he might nonetheless feel betrayed after he had waived his usual fee, Universal offered to pay him the full $20 million fee, but Costner declined.

== Reception ==
=== Critical response ===
On the review aggregator website Rotten Tomatoes, 47% of 96 critics' reviews are positive, with an average rating of 6.1/10. The website's consensus reads: "Baseball wins, romance loses." Metacritic, which uses a weighted average, assigned the film a score of 43 out of 100, based on 31 critics, indicating "mixed or average" reviews. Audiences polled by CinemaScore gave the film an average grade of "B+" on an A+ to F scale.

In Roger Ebert's review for the Chicago Sun-Times, he gave the film one and a half stars out of four, calling it "the most lugubrious and soppy love story in many a moon, a step backward for director Sam Raimi after A Simple Plan, and yet another movie in which Kevin Costner plays a character who has all the right window dressing but is neither juicy nor interesting."

=== Box office ===
The film opened at No. 2 with a weekend gross of $13,041,685 from 2,829 theaters for a per venue average of $7,023. Ultimately, For Love of the Game grossed only $35,188,640 domestically and an additional $10,924,000 in other territories to a total of $46,112,640 worldwide. Based on an estimated $50 million budget, the film lost money.

== Accolades ==
Awards
Award	Year	Category	Recipients	Result
Blockbuster Entertainment Awards	May 9, 2000	Favorite Supporting Actress – Drama/Romance	Jena Malone	Nominated
Motion Picture Sound Editors	March 25, 2000	Best Sound Editing – Dialogue & ADR	Kelly Cabral, Wylie Stateman, Jennifer L. Mann, Lauren Stephens, Richard Dwan Jr., Elizabeth Kenton, Chris Hogan, Dan Hegeman, Constance A. Kazmer	Nominated
Razzie Awards	March 25, 2000	Worst Actor	Kevin Costner	Nominated
Young Artist Awards	March 19, 2000	Best Family Feature Film – Drama		Nominated
Young Artist Awards	March 19, 2000	Best Performance in a Feature Film – Supporting Young Actress	Jena Malone	Nominated
YoungStar Awards	November 19, 2000	Best Young Actress/Performance in a Motion Picture Drama	Jena Malone	Nominated

== See also ==
- List of baseball films
- Field of Dreams
- Bull Durham
