= The Noah Conspiracy =

1981 novel by Michael Shaara

- First edition
- Author: Michael Shaara
- Original title: The Herald
- Language: English
- Genre: Science fiction
- Publisher: Mcgraw-Hill
- Publication date: 1981
- Pages: 229
- ISBN: 0-07-056376-4

The Noah Conspiracy is a 1981 novel by American writer Michael Shaara, first published as The Herald.

It is a science fiction story about the fate of humankind, in which millions are dying, and one man must choose between saving humankind or saving the future. It takes its name from the Biblical character of Noah, who entered an ark to save himself and his family.
