= Beacon Pictures =

Film production company

Beacon Communications, LLC
- Industry: Film; Television
- Founded: January 1, 1990; 36 years ago in Tokyo, Japan
- Founder: Armyan Bernstein
- Headquarters: Santa Monica, California, United States
- Key people: Armyan Bernstein (chairman)
- Products: Motion pictures Television series
- Website: beaconpictures.com

Beacon Communications, LLC, commonly referred to as Beacon Pictures, is an American film and television production and international sales company founded on January 1, 1990, by Armyan Bernstein, who is also its chairman. The company produces motion pictures for studios such as Walt Disney Studios Motion Pictures, Universal Pictures and Sony Pictures Entertainment.

Tom Rosenberg is an original co-founder and was the company's investor. He sold its stake in 1994 to launch Lakeshore Entertainment. In 1991, the company signed a three-year deal with 20th Century Fox. In 1993, the company then signed a first look deal with Sony Pictures Entertainment. In 1996, it struck a first look deal with Universal.

Beacon was acquired in 1994 by COMSAT, who a year later put the company under its Ascent Entertainment Group division. By early 1999, Ascent was about to be broken up due to financial problems, mostly stemming from building the Pepsi Center in Denver. Bernstein and venture capitalist Kevin O'Donnell, son of Kennedy administration special assistant and appointments secretary Kenny O'Donnell, purchased Beacon back, restoring its independent company status.

In 2002, three executives of Beacon, namely producer Marc Abraham, Beacon COO Thomas Bliss and senior VP of development Eric Newman left the company to form Strike Entertainment, with a first-look deal at Universal Pictures. Beacon then signed a deal with The Walt Disney Studios to handle distribution of its future film properties, except for free television in 2002. In 2006, the company expanded to television production with a deal at Touchstone Television.

== Films ==
- The Commitments (1991) with 20th Century Fox
- A Midnight Clear (1992) with InterStar Releasing and A&M Films
- A Life in the Theatre (1993) with TNT
- Sugar Hill (1993) with 20th Century Fox
- Princess Caraboo (1994) with TriStar Pictures
- The Road to Wellville (1994) with Columbia Pictures
- The Baby-Sitters Club (1995) with Columbia Pictures and Scholastic
- The Van (1996) with Fox Searchlight Pictures and BBC Films
- Air Force One (1997) with Columbia Pictures and Touchstone Pictures
- A Thousand Acres (1997) with Touchstone Pictures, PolyGram Filmed Entertainment and Propaganda Films
- Playing God (1997) with Touchstone Pictures
- Disturbing Behavior (1998) with Metro-Goldwyn-Mayer, Hoyts Distribution and Village Roadshow Pictures
- Trippin' (1999) with Rogue Pictures
- For Love of the Game (1999) with Universal Pictures, Tig Productions and Mirage Enterprises
- The Hurricane (1999) with Universal Pictures
- End of Days (1999) with Universal Pictures
- Duets (2000) with Hollywood Pictures and Seven Arts Pictures
- The Family Man (2000) with Universal Pictures and Saturn Films
- Bring It On (2000) with Universal Pictures
- Thirteen Days (2000) with New Line Cinema
- Spy Game (2001) with Universal Pictures, Kalima Productions Gmbh & Co. kg, Red Wagon Entertainment and Toho-Towa
- Tuck Everlasting (2002) with Walt Disney Pictures and Scholastic
- The Emperor's Club (2002) with Universal Pictures and Sidney Kimmel Entertainment
- Open Range (2003) with Touchstone Pictures and Tig Productions
- Ladder 49 (2004) with Touchstone Pictures and Casey Silver Productions
- Bring It On Again (2004) with Universal Pictures
- Raising Helen (2004) with Touchstone Pictures, Mandeville Films and Hyde Park Entertainment
- A Lot like Love (2005) with Touchstone Pictures
- Bring It On: All or Nothing (2006) with Universal Pictures
- Firewall (2006) with Warner Bros. Pictures, Village Roadshow Pictures and Thunder Road Pictures
- The Guardian (2006) with Touchstone Pictures and Flash Film Works
- Pu-239 (2006) with HBO Films and Section Eight Productions
- Uncle P (2007) with New Line Cinema
- Bring It On: In It to Win It (2007) with Universal Pictures
- The Water Horse: Legend of the Deep (2007) with Columbia Pictures, Revolution Studios and Walden Media
- Bring It On: Fight to the Finish (2009) with Universal Pictures
- Mardi Gras: Spring Break (2011) with Samuel Goldwyn Films and Screen Gems
- Grey Lady (2015) with Broadvision Pictures and Anchor Bay Films
- Bring It On: Worldwide Cheersmack (2017) with Universal Pictures
- Bring It On: Cheer or Die (2022) with Universal 1440 Entertainment and Syfy

== Television ==
- The Earth Day Special (1990) with Warner Bros. Television
- NY-LON (2008) with CBS
- Castle (2009–16) with Disney-ABC Domestic Television
- Agent X (2015) with Warner Bros. Television and TNT
