= Juliette Marquis =

Ukrainian-American actress and model

- Born: Juliette Dudnik; April 16, 1980 (age 46); Kiev, Ukrainian SSR
- Occupations: Model, actress
- Years active: 2001–present

Juliette Marquis (born Dudnik, April 16, 1980) is a Ukrainian-born American actress, model, producer and former ballerina.

She is a partner at the production company More Better World, Inc. and is a producer, writer and director focused on non-fiction investigative storytelling.

== Early life and education ==
Marquis was born to a Jewish Ukrainian family in Kyiv, Ukraine. She moved with her family to Chicago, Illinois when she was eight. She started modeling when she was 14. At age 17, she moved to Miami to pursue her modelling career, and then to Europe. She has lived in Paris, New York City and Los Angeles. She earned a degree from Villanova University in Project Management and launched Marquis Enterprise.

== Film career ==
Marquis won Best Newcomer Award at the 2003 CineVegas film festival and a Miglior recitazione femminile (best actress) at the 2005 Milan Film Festival, both for This Girl's Life.

== Filmography ==
- This Girl's Life (2003)
- Chicks with Sticks (2004)
- London (2005)
- Into the Sun (2005)
- The Insurgents (2006)
- The Phobic (2006)
- Phantom Love (2007)

She has written, produced and directed several documentaries.
