= For Love of the Game =

1991 novel by Michael Shaara

- First edition cover
- Author: Michael Shaara
- Language: English
- Genre: Sports novel
- Publisher: Carroll & Graf Publishers
- Publication date: 1991
- Publication place: United States
- Media type: Print (hardcover)
- Pages: 152 pp (hardcover edition)
- ISBN: 0-88184-695-3 (hardcover edition)
- OCLC: 23080721
- Dewey Decimal: 813/.54 20
- LC Class: PS3569.H2 F67 1991

For Love of the Game is a novel by American author Michael Shaara, published posthumously in 1991. The book tells the story of fictional baseball great Billy Chapel, thirty-seven years old and nearing the end of his career. This short book was discovered after Shaara's death, and publishing was arranged by his son, author Jeffrey Shaara. The book was made into a movie by Sam Raimi.

== Plot summary ==
On the second to last day of the season, Chapel's team, the Atlanta Hawks (no relation to the NBA team of the same name), are about to play against the New York Yankees. Chapel receives news from a friend in the media he is about to be traded. Just the night before, his girlfriend Carol did not show up at his hotel room, and Chapel reaches the conclusion that it is time to move on and finally make the transition from boyhood to manhood.

Over half the book tells the story of that final game, with flashbacks from the pitching mound and dugout to incidents throughout Chapel's life. Chapel is determined that his last game will also be his greatest, even though, with all the young new players on the Yankees, they are a far superior team. As he strikes out his opponents one after the other, he soon becomes aware he has held the Yankees at bay thus far, not allowing one hit from the more talented Yankees team. He soon becomes determined to pitch a perfect game. Meanwhile, he reflects on his personal life, and especially on Carol, whom he finally realizes that he loves, even though he has never shown her that he really does. That morning Carol told him she was going to London and was leaving immediately, so the two key passions of his life, Carol and baseball, are about to vanish forever.

As the game proceeds, Chapel feels the sharp pain in his arm that comes with age. Nevertheless, he refuses to give up the pitching mound, and chooses instead to divert his attention by delving deeper into his life and his relationship. At the end of the game, he has pitched a perfect game and retires from baseball with a new dignity. After the celebrations, he heads to the hotel and dials Carol's home, where he plans to go to tell Carol his feelings. With baseball behind him, he has grown from a boy who has led a life into manhood.
