= Moonglow (film) =

- Directed by: Isabel Sandoval
- Written by: Isabel Sandoval
- Produced by: Alemberg Ang; Ria Atayde; Isabel Sandoval; Tan Si En; Takahiro Yamashita
- Starring: Isabel Sandoval; Arjo Atayde; Rocco Nacino; Dennis Marasigan; Janina Lorelei; Jhoanna San Juan; Agot Isidro
- Cinematography: Isaac Banks
- Edited by: Daniel Garber; Isabel Sandoval
- Music by: Keegan DeWitt
- Production companies: Daluyong Studios; Nathan Studios
- Release date: 4 February 2026 (IFFR)
- Running time: 120 minutes
- Countries: Philippines; Taiwan; Japan
- Language: Filipino
- Budget: $1.08 million

Moonglow is a 2026 neo-noir romantic thriller film directed, written, and produced by Isabel Sandoval, who also stars in the lead role. Set in Manila in 1979 during Ferdinand Marcos's martial law, the film follows Dahlia (Sandoval), a police officer who commits a robbery and is then assigned to investigate her own crime alongside a former lover, Charlie (Arjo Atayde). The film premiered in the Big Screen Competition at the 55th International Film Festival Rotterdam on February 4, 2026. It received mixed reviews from critics, who praised its atmospheric visuals but criticized its pacing and narrative tension.

== Plot ==
In 1979 Manila, while Ferdinand Marcos's martial law is in effect, a woman named Dahlia works as a police officer under Chief Bernal. She is assigned to investigate a high-profile robbery. Dahlia herself committed the robbery, and she has stashed the stolen money in her apartment.

To assist with the investigation, Bernal brings in his nephew, Charlie, a lawyer who has recently returned from the United States to care for his sick father. Twelve years earlier, Dahlia and Charlie had been lovers. As they begin working together, their romantic past resurfaces.

As Charlie's investigation progresses, he grows closer to discovering Dahlia's role in the crime. Dahlia, meanwhile, is revealed to have committed the robbery not out of personal greed but to redistribute wealth to Manila's poor. The initial robbery exposes a larger web of corruption involving arson and real estate development.

Charlie confronts the truth about Dahlia. Bernal also finds out that Dahlia is the culprit and hires different assassins to catch her. Dahlia and Charlie shoot Bernal.

== Cast ==
- Isabel Sandoval
- Arjo Atayde
- Rocco Nacino
- Agot Isidro
- Janina Lorelei
- Jhoanna San Juan

== Development ==
After completing her third feature Lingua Franca (2019), Sandoval directed episodes of the television series Under the Banner of Heaven, Tell Me Lies, and The Summer I Turned Pretty. She has described Moonglow as her "comeback film," marking her return to the Philippines to shoot a feature since Aparisyon (2012) and stating that she feels more artistically free to explore film as a medium in the Philippines than in the United States. The film was shot over more than 20 days in Manila in April and May 2024. The hot temperatures at the time forced Sandoval to rewrite some scenes for them to be shot during nighttime and indoors. She worked with cinematographer Isaac Banks, who had previously shot Lingua Franca, and composer Keegan DeWitt, who also scored her short film Shangri-La (2021). The sound design was completed in Taipei with Tu Duu-chih, known for his collaborations with Edward Yang, Hou Hsiao-hsien, and Wong Kar-wai. The film was produced by Alemberg Ang, among others.

Sandoval has cited musical influences on the film, particularly the jazz soundtrack of Louis Malle's Elevator to the Gallows (1958) by Miles Davis. She listened to the song "Générique" on loop while writing the screenplay, stating that she "wanted to make a film that really embodied the mood and the atmosphere from that song." Other musical influences included Johnny Mathis's "Misty" and Nat King Cole's "The Very Thought of You."

Unlike her previous films, which were rooted in social realism, Sandoval approached Moonglow as a deliberate exercise in artifice, embracing the stylized conventions of 1940s and 1950s film noir and Hollywood melodrama. She has said that she is "only interested in genre tropes to subvert them, or to kind of flout them," and that she considers the film "a melodrama, perhaps a romantic melodrama specifically filtered through noir." She has also described her performance as an attempt to "embody a star persona" in the tradition of actresses like Barbara Stanwyck.

Sandoval has noted that she is drawn to "women who have secrets or a double life and are dealing with some kind of personal or existential crisis in a clearly defined socio-political context." She sees her work as a kind of "Rorschach test" through which she projects unresolved personal dramas. The film's final scene, in which the two leads lie together in bed without any sexual contact, was intentionally chaste; Sandoval explained that she "would dissipate the tension, whatever tension there is between them, erotically or sexually, if I consummate that."

== Release and reception ==
Moonglow had its world premiere at the 55th International Film Festival Rotterdam on February 4, 2026. In May 2026, the film closed the First Look festival of New York's Museum of the Moving Image and opened the XPOSED Queer Film Festival in Berlin.

=== Critical response ===
Reviews from the initial festival run highlighted the film's craft while noting its dramatic shortcomings. The Hollywood Reporter's Stephen Mintzer described the film as "elegantly lensed and colorfully designed," a "film noir time capsule [with] shades of both Chinatown and In the Mood for Love." However, he concluded that it is "slow-burn to a fault, with story twists we see coming a long time before they happen," and that it "lacks the suspense any good thriller needs." In a similarly mixed assessment, Guy Lodge of Variety called it "a letdown, indifferently plotted as a thriller and only intermittently convincing as a character piece," while noting the film's "muzzy, hazy layers of humid tropical-nights atmosphere." He was especially critical of the late title-card drop (49 minutes in), writing that "such an affectation ... underlines what audiences may already be feeling: With nearly an hour on the clock, this elegantly appointed story ... doesn't really feel like it's got started."

Writing for ScreenDaily, Lee Marshall offered a measured assessment, deeming the film an "underpowered Filipino neo-noir" that "does its best to coast along on sheer smoky atmosphere." Marshall noted that aside from "two brief radio news items, allusions to a toxic real estate development, and a general sense of malaise, there's little attempt to take the pulse of the country at large."

Several reviews highlighted the film's political backdrop. Mintzer noted that "the way Sandoval rolls her country's troubled past into a genre plot recalls another recent tropical thriller, Kleber Mendonça Filho's The Secret Agent." Lodge, however, felt that the film's opening James Baldwin quote ("People are trapped in history, and history is trapped in them") implies "intellectual and political intentions beyond mere genre thrills" that the film would never fully deliver on.

Critics were divided on Sandoval's dual role as director and lead actress. Variety found the chemistry between her and co-star Arjo Atayde "murmurs more than it crackles, not helped by Sandoval's sometimes ungainly writing." The Hollywood Reporter similarly described the performances as "laconic," adding that they "don't exactly keep viewers on the edge of their seats." Marshall observed a "distinct mismatch between the underplayed performance of Atayde and the tragic fatalism Sandoval brings to her role."

The film's visual style was widely praised. Isaac Banks' cinematography was described by Variety as "soft, velvety dusk tones, like a languid, fevered vision a few beats behind reality." Keegan DeWitt's score was noted as "faded, floating-on-the-night-breeze jazz compositions". Marshall praised Keegan Dewitt's "spare, echoey, jazzy soundtrack" and a "crane shot up to the dawn glow of downtown Manila followed by another down though a canyon of brutalist tenements" as among "several cool style moves."

=== Accolades ===
Moonglow was nominated for the Big Screen Competition award at the 2026 International Film Festival Rotterdam, where it ultimately lost to the film Master.
