= Crown Seven Ventures =

Philippine film production company

- Company type: Private
- Industry: Film production
- Founded: 1975 (as Crown Seven Film Productions); 1977 (as Seven Stars Productions); 1998 (as Crown Seven Ventures)
- Defunct: 1983 (first iteration); 2001 (second iteration)
- Fate: Closed
- Headquarters: Manila, Philippines
- Owner: Jesse Ejercito

Crown Seven Ventures was a Philippine film production company owned by Jesse Ejercito.

== History ==
The film company was established in 1975 by Jesse Ejercito as Crown Seven Film Productions with Mister Mo, Lover Boy Ko as its maiden movie. In 1977, it changed its name to Seven Stars Productions. It launched the careers of Elizabeth Oropesa, Chanda Romero, Alma Moreno, Lorna Tolentino and Amy Austria, among others.

In 1983, Seven Stars closed down after Moral, which was an entry to the 1982 Metro Manila Film Festival, where it won Best Screenplay award. A couple of years later, Ejercito returned to producing several films for various film companies. He also run the short-lived Merdeka Film Productions with Edmer Lim from 1995 to 1997.

In 1998, Ejercito, along with Wilson Tieng of Solar Films, revived the film company as Crown Seven Ventures with Kasal-kasalan as its comeback movie, an entry to the 1998 Metro Manila Film Festival. The following year, it released Sidhi, which won five awards at the 2000 FAMAS Awards, including Best Actor, Best Supporting Actress and Best Story. It followed with a remake of Mister Mo, Lover Ko. Among its homegrown talents were Glydel Mercado, Priscilla Almeda, Janna Victoria and Mylene Dizon.

In January 2001, amid the impeachment of then President Joseph Estrada, Crown Seven closed down for good, leaving its talents affected. Gatas: Sa Dibdib ng Kaaway was its last film produced.

Solar Entertainment Corporation currently owns Crown Seven's film library.
