= Isabel Sandoval =

Filipino filmmaker

- Sandoval in 2026
- Born: March 20, 1982 (age 44); Cebu City, Central Visayas, Philippines
- Education: University of San Carlos (BA); New York University (MBA)
- Occupations: Filmmaker; actress
- Years active: 2010–present

Isabel Sandoval is an independent Filipino filmmaker and actress who is currently based in the United States. She directed the films Señorita (2011), Aparisyon (2012) and Lingua Franca (2019). She also directed the short film Shangri-La (2021) as part of Miu Miu's Women's Tales series of female-directed short films commissioned by the fashion brand.

== Early life and education ==
Isabel Sandoval was born in 1982 in Cebu City in the Philippines. She is an only child raised by a single mother. Her love for film began at the age of four, when her mother took her to a pre-war movie palace to watch a Filipino slapstick comedy.

She studied Psychology at the University of San Carlos, where she graduated summa cum laude. She then moved to New York City to pursue her MBA from New York University's Stern School of Business. Not long after she finished her MBA, she got together with her cinematographer roommate to shoot the short version of Señorita, her debut feature.

== Career ==
=== Feature Films ===
Isabel Sandoval has produced, written, and directed three feature-length films. In 2011, Sandoval directed her first feature, Señorita, a film about a trans woman working on a political campaign and raising a young boy. She played the film's protagonist, though she was not out as trans at the time, and has said that the role helped her realize her identity. This film premiered at the Locarno Film Festival and was nominated for Best Picture by the Young Critics Circle of the Philippines.

In 2012, she directed the film Aparisyon (Apparition), starring actresses Jodi Sta. Maria and Mylene Dizon, about a convent of nuns in a remote area of the Philippines in 1971, just before the declaration of martial law by Ferdinand Marcos. In 2017, Apparition was screened at MoMA as a part of the “A New Golden Age: Contemporary Philippine Cinema” series alongside works of other Filipino filmmakers, Lav Diaz and Brillante Mendoza. She mentioned that after finishing this film, she “was certain and discreetly started my transition shortly after.”

Her third feature film is Lingua Franca, released in 2019 and was shot in 16 days in Brooklyn, New York, starring herself, Eamon Farren and Lynn Cohen. In the film, Sandoval plays an undocumented Filipino trans woman who falls in love with the adult grandson of the elderly woman for whom she is working as a caregiver. Lingua Franca is her first feature film to be set and produced in the United States and is her first film after her gender transition. She began her gender transition when Trump was first elected to the white house, and she stated that Lingua Franca came to her during that period. Although it’s not an autobiographical film, it captures the emotional state she was in at the time. Sandoval became the first out trans woman of color to compete at the Venice Film Festival when Lingua Franca premiered there. The film won the award for best narrative feature at the Bentonville Film Festival, and was released by ARRAY and streamed on Netflix. Sandoval was named Best Actress at the 18th International Cinephile Society Awards, and at the Pacific Meridian International Film Festival.

=== Short Films and TV Shows ===
In 2021, Sandoval wrote and directed Shangri-La (filmed in two months), a short film commissioned by the Miu Miu Women's Tales project which asks female directors to examine "femininity in the 21st century", releasing it in February 2021. Like Lingua Franca, Shangri-La deals with forbidden love and racial prejudice. The same year, she signed with Creative Artists Agency.

In addition to her feature-length and short films, she has also worked on numerous TV show episodes. In 2022, she directed her first TV episode for the FX drama series Under the Banner of Heaven, which stars Andrew Garfield. In a TV interview, Andrew Garfield recalls his unforgettable experience working with Sandoval, “I love her (Isabel). She’s incredible. She’s so precise, so sensitive, so professional, so talented and astute. She’s great.” In the same year, she directed two episodes of the Hulu series Tell Me Lies, created by Meaghan Oppenheimer.

In 2023, she directed two episodes of The Summer I Turned Pretty, a coming-of-age romantic television series created by the author Jenny Han.

Sandoval recently wrapped her upcoming film, Moonglow, set in late-1970s Manila with Arjo Atayde attached into the project.

Sandoval is also developing a drama for FX, Vespertine, and a film, Tropical Gothic, about the haunting of a Spanish conquistador in the 16th-century Philippines and based on the 1972 short story collection of the same name by Nick Joaquin. In March 2021, Tropical Gothic won the VFF talent highlight award at the Berlinale, worth 10,000 euros towards its production and according to her recorded interview with GMA News, has plans to be screened at either Cannes, Venice or Berlin.

== Influences and themes ==
Sandoval was inspired by films that depict impossible love relationships. She has stated that she enjoyed watching Hong Kong filmmaker Wong Kar-wai's film, In the Mood for Love (2000), for its style and profound melancholy. Its concept of emotional destination was a profound theme that influenced her. She sought to express illicit emotions that were distinctive, singular, and complex as she had not seen in films before. Sandoval consistently explores the themes of marginalization and the intersectionality between complex identities and socio-political issues. As she progresses as a filmmaker, she realizes that she is more inclined to use this medium to shed light on the female experience. In her interview with Vogue Philippines, she stated, "I'm drawn to women protagonists that are disempowered in some way [...] who in the bigger picture, might seem powerless but in their realm, with their relationships, they try to assert themselves somehow as a way to hold on to their dignity."

In 2020, Ava DuVernay's ARRAY, acquired Lingua Franca and led to its streaming on Netflix and screening in selected theaters. in developing the styles of work. Other films which she has cited as influencing her were: Ali: Fear Eats the Soul (1974) by the director Rainer Werner Fassbinder, News from Home (1977) by Chantal Akerman, and Klute (1971) by Alan J. Pakula.

== Filmography ==
=== Short film ===
Year	Title	Director	Writer	Actress	Editor
2004	Ritwal	No	Yes	No	No
2009	Señorita	Yes	No	Yes	No
2017	Woman	No	No	Yes	No
2020	A 1984 Period Piece in Present Day	No	No	Yes	No
2021	The Actress	No	No	Yes	No
2021	Shangri-La	Yes	Yes	Yes	Yes
2022	Maria Schneider, 1983	No	No	Yes	No
2026	Tropical Gothic	Yes	Yes	No	No

Executive Producer

- Anino (2025)

=== Feature film ===
Year	Title	Director	Writer	Producer	Actress
2011	Señorita	Yes	Yes	Yes	Yes
2012	Aparisyon	Yes	Yes	No	No
2019	Lingua Franca	Yes	Yes	Yes	Yes
2022	Boblo Boats: A Detroit Ferry Tale	No	No	Yes	No
2026	Moonglow	Yes	Yes	Yes	Yes
2026	Let Us Through, Dear Ancestors	No	No	No	Yes

=== Television ===
Year	Title	Notes
2022	Under the Banner of Heaven	1 episode
2022	Tell Me Lies	2 episodes
2023	The Summer I Turned Pretty	2 episodes

== Awards and nominations ==
Awards	Year	Category	Title	Result
American Film Festival	2019	Narrative Feature	Lingua Franca	Nominated
Bentonville Film Festival	2020	Best Narrative	Lingua Franca	Won
Cabourg Romantic Film Festival	2020	Best Film	Lingua Franca	Nominated
Chéries-Chéries	2019	Feature Film	Lingua Franca	Won
Cinemalaya Independent Film Festival	2012	Best Film - New Breed	Aparisyon	Nominated
Cinemanila International Film Festival	2011	Lino Brocka Award/Digital Lokal	Señorita	Nominated
Deauville Asian Film Festival	2013	Audience Award	Aparisyon	Won
Deauville Asian Film Festival	2013	Best Film	Aparisyon	Nominated
Film Independent Spirit Awards	2021	John Cassavetes Award (shared with Darlene Catly Malimas, Jhett Tolentino, Carlo Velayo)	Lingua Franca	Nominated
GALECA: The Society of LGBTQ Entertainment Critics	2021	Trailblazer Award		Won
Greater Western New York Film Critics Association Awards	2020	Breakthrough Performance	Lingua Franca	Nominated
Hamburg Film Festival	2019	Sichtwechsel Film Award	Lingua Franca	Nominated
Hawaii International Film Festival	2012	Netpac Award	Aparisyon	Won
International Cinephile Society Awards	2021	Best Actress	Lingua Franca	Won
International Cinephile Society Awards	2021	Best Director	Lingua Franca	Nominated
International Cinephile Society Awards	2021	Best Original Screenplay	Lingua Franca	Nominated
Locarno International Film Festival	2011	Golden Leopard - Filmmakers of the Present	Señorita	Nominated
London Film Festival	2019	Official Competition	Lingua Franca	Nominated
Molodist International Film Festival	2020	Special Jury Diploma	Lingua Franca	Won
Molodist International Film Festival	2020	Best LGBTQ Film	Lingua Franca	Nominated
Mons International Festival of Love Films	2020	International Competition	Lingua Franca	Nominated
Oslo/Fusion International Film Festival	2020	Best Feature Film	Lingua Franca	Won
Pacific Meridian International Film Festival of Asia Pacific Countries	2020	Best Actress	Lingua Franca	Won
Pusan International Film Festival	2012	New Currents Award	Aparisyon	Nominated
Queer Lisboa - Festival Internacional de Cinema Queer	2020	Best Feature Film	Lingua Franca	Won
SoHo International Film Festival	2010	Best Showcase Short Film	Señorita	Nominated
Thessaloniki Film Festival	2019	Mermaid Award	Lingua Franca	Nominated
TLVFest - The Tel Aviv International LGBTQ Film Festival	2020	Best Film	Lingua Franca	Won
Vancouver International Film Festival	2011	Dragons and Tigers Award	Señorita	Nominated
Venice Film Festival	2019	Best Film (Venice Days)	Lingua Franca	Nominated
Venice Film Festival	2019	Queer Lion	Lingua Franca	Nominated
Wicked Queer: The Boston LGBT Film Festival	2020	Narrative Feature	Lingua Franca	Nominated
Young Critics Circle, Philippines	2020	Best Performance by Male or Female, Adult or Child, Individual or Ensemble in Leading or Supporting Role Best Screenplay Best Achievement in Film Editing Best Film	Lingua Franca	Won Nominated Nominated Nominated
Young Critics Circle, Philippines	2013	Best Screen Play (shared with Jerry Garcio) Best Achievement in Film Editing (shared with Jarrold Tarog)	Aparisyon	Nominated
Young Critics Circle, Philippines	2012	Best Film Best Performance by Male or Female, Adult or Child, Individual or Ensemble in Leading or Supporting Role Best Screenplay (shared with Roy Sevilla Ho[writer])	Señorita	Nominated
^{Hollywood Critics Association Television Awards}	2022	^{Best Directing in a Streaming Limited Series, Anthology Series, or Movie}	^{Under the Banner of Heaven}	Nominated
Gold List Awards	2021	Best Original Screenplay	Lingua Franca	Won
Society of Filipino Film Reviewers (Pinoy Rebyu Award)	2021	^{Best film}^{Best Director}^{Best Lead Performance}^{Best Screenplay}^{Best Editing}	Lingua Franca	^{Nominated}^{Nominated}^{Nominated}^{Won}^{Nominated}

== See also ==
- List of transgender film and television directors
