= Brad Carter =

American actor and artist (born 1973)

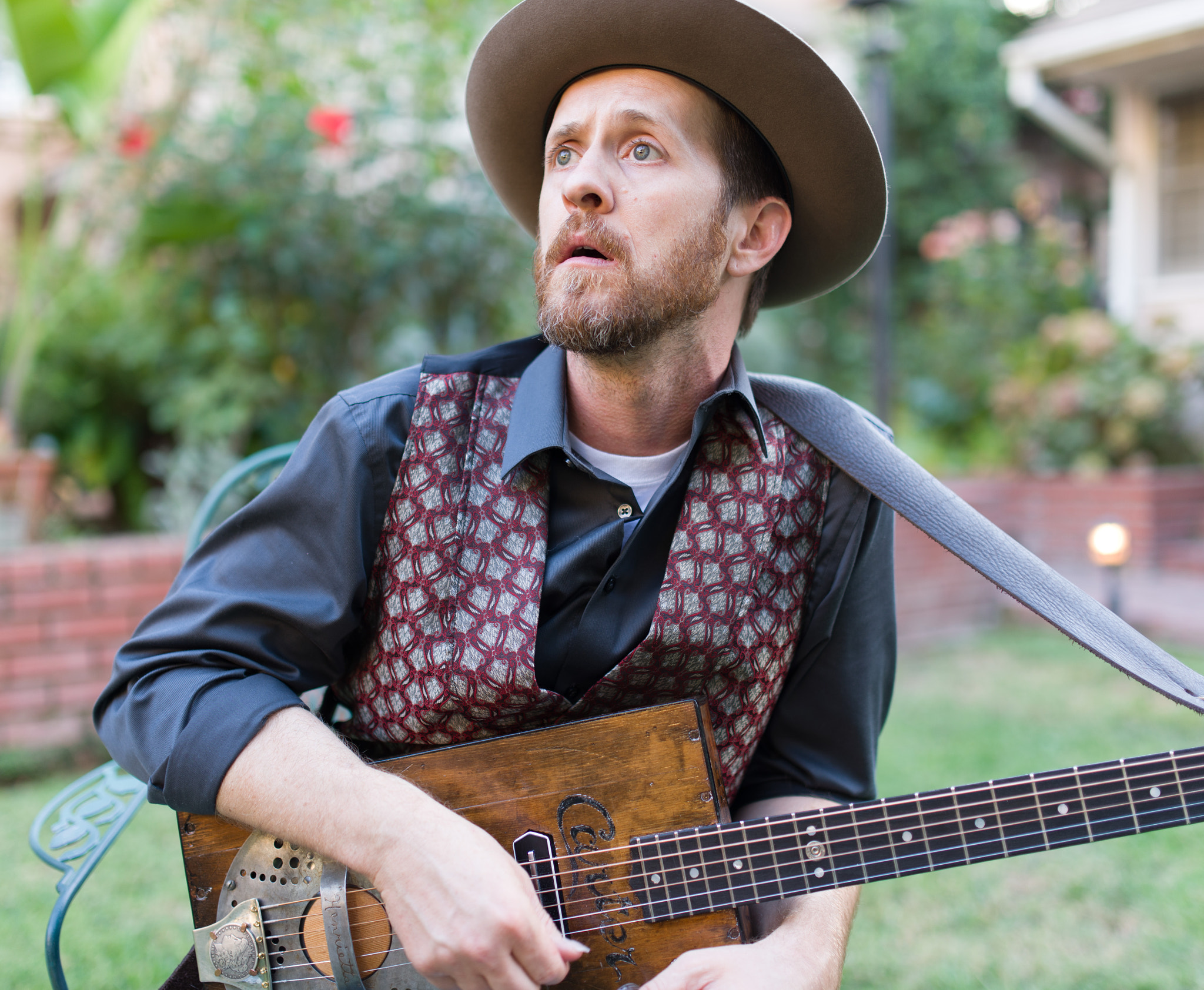
- Carter in 2013
- Born: David Bradley Carter; December 5, 1973 (age 52); Fort Worth, Texas, United States
- Occupations: Actor; guitarist; painter; sculptor; photographer; acting teacher
- Years active: 2007–present
- Known for: Actor, Musician, Artist, Acting Teacher, Guy who played guitar during brain surgery live over the internet.
- Notable work: True Detective; Sons of Anarchy; Red Dead Redemption; Ascension; Signing Tony Raymond; Eat Me; HOUSE; It's Always Sunny in Philadelphia
- Website: bradcarterofficial.com

David Bradley Carter (born December 5, 1973) is an American actor whose work spans movies, TV, commercials, as well as Voice over and motion capture for video games. Brad is an accomplished song writer, film composer, guitarist, painter, sculptor, photographer, and acting coach.

Brad Carter is best known for playing "Donnie" in Grand Theft Auto VI. Other notable appearances include True Detective, Yellowstone, 911 Nashville, Sons of Anarchy, Ozark, Always Sunny, The Runarounds, Signing Tony Raymond, House, New Girl, Ascension, Longmire, Justified, Dexter, and "Deputy Jonah" in Red Dead Redemption.

In 2013, one month after filming True Detective, Carter underwent elective brain surgery known as "DBS" (deep brain stimulation). Brad chose to shave most of his head for the role since he would have to shave it anyway for the surgery. Ronald Reagan UCLA Medical Hospital live-tweeted the surgery which went viral around the world. In a matter of hours Brad became known as the "guy playing guitar during brain surgery". One can still find videos on youtube of the surgery, though most have been removed.

== Early life and education ==
The son of a Methodist Minister, Carter was born in Fort Worth, Texas, and raised in Macon, Georgia. He graduated with a Bachelor of Fine Arts degree in 1997 from Valdosta State University, located in Valdosta, Georgia where he honed his skills sculpting bronze, and working with oils.

== Career ==
Carter appeared in CSI as two different characters, once in 2009, and again in 2013.

In 2010, Carter made guest appearances in It's Always Sunny in Philadelphia, Disney's Zeke and Luther, Justified, True Blood, and New Girl. He portrayed Rankin in one episode of the Showtime series Dexter, wherein his character was the first and only person killed outside of Dexter's "code".

In 2012–13, Carter made guest appearances in The Mentalist, Bones, Longmire, and CSI: Crime Scene Investigation.

In 2014, Carter made guest appearances in two episodes of HBO's True Detective opposite Matthew McConaughey as Charlie Lange, an ex-husband of murdered Dora Lange, the case around which the series revolves. Later, he portrayed Leland Gruen, an Aryan Brotherhood member, in three episodes of FX's Sons of Anarchy. Then he played John Stokes, a stockyard master, in the miniseries Ascension.

In 2015, Carter was straight offered the role of "Jukebox" opposite Johnny Knoxville, David Koechner and Lavelle Crawford in the ABC comedy pilot "Knoxville" which wasn't picked up for series. Carter starred that year in the film Dixieland, and portrayed murder victim John McIntyre in Black Mass, directed by Scott Cooper, and based on a true story. Carter appeared in the drama The Revenant (2015), opposite Leonardo DiCaprio and Tom Hardy, directed by Alejandro González Iñárritu. He appeared in the 2018 film Eat Me opposite Michael Shamus Wiles, directed by Adrian Cruz.

In 2016 Carter became known as the beloved Velveeta Shells and Cheese spokesperson named "Shelly", the curmudgeony prospector who guarded his beloved Velveeta "liquid gold" in the supermarket.

== Brain surgery ==
Nader Pouratian, director of UCLA's Neurosurgical Movement Disorders Program, performed brain surgery on Carter twice, once in March 2013 and again in August 2013 after the first surgery was considered unsuccessful. The surgery involved implanting an electrode in his brain, and then a separate surgery to put wires down his neck to an implant in his chest. Carter was interviewed in episodes of Nat Geo and the Today Show about the Surgery.

Carter had first noticed tremors in his hands in 2006, which were misdiagnosed as symptoms of Lyme disease by three specialists. During the operation, Carter needed to be awake for the best results, and played guitar to help guide his surgeon to the right place to alleviate the tremor.

A video recording was made of Carter's operation, which was live-tweeted to Twitter and later posted on YouTube. The video went viral and received media attention worldwide. Carter became known as the "guy playing guitar during brain surgery." The hospital staff had requested the video recording to help allay those suffering from similar diseases who were curious about the surgery.

== Filmography ==
=== Film ===
Year	Title	Role	Notes
2007	Avenging Angel	Gunman #2	Television film
2008	Night Life	Dave	Television film
2009	Karma Bitch	Pool Man Jim	Short film
2010	The Boy Who Stole'd Christmas	Wade	Short film
2010	Red Dead Redemption: The Man from Blackwater	Deputy Marshal Jonah (voice)	Short film
2012	One Week	Roy	Short film
2012	Crash & Burn	JT Steckel	Television film
2012	Smashed	Felix	
2013	The Sleepy Man	Red	Short film
2013	String Theory	Clint	Short film
2014	Swelter	Mechanic	
2014	The Gun	Crazed Scavener	Short film
2015	Untitled Johnny Knoxville Project	Jukebox	Television film
2015	Dixieland	Larry Pretty	
2015	Black Mass	John McIntyre	
2015	Pariah	Breeder	Television film
2015	The Highway Is for Gamblers	Simon	
2015	The 7 Sevens	Jesse	Short film
2015	The Revenant	Johnnie	Uncredited
2016	Free State of Jones	Lt. Barbour	
2017	The Scent of Rain and Lightning	Billy	
2018	Eat Me	Bob	
2018	Armed	Shep/Stew	
2018	White Boy Rick	Weapon Salesman	
2019	The Devil to Pay	Dixon Runion	
2020	Emperor	Grady	
2021	Old Henry	Branigan	
2023	Eating 38 Cheeseburgers	Director Jacob	Short film
2025	Signing Tony Raymond	Ronnie Raymond	

=== Television ===
Year	Title	Role	Notes
2008	The Riches	Billy	1 episode
2009	It's Always Sunny in Philadelphia	Carney	1 episode
2009	CSI	Gerald Toliver	1 episode
2010	Zeke and Luther	Steve	2 episodes
2010	Justified	Bobby Joe Packer	2 episodes
2010	True Blood	Kris	1 episode
2010	Dexter	Rankin	Episode: "My Bad"
2010	Criminal Minds	Charlie	1 episode
2011	Harry's Law	Stevie Kazz	1 episode
2011	Castle	Bobby Spurlock	1 episode
2012	House	Sheldon	Episode: "Runaways"
2012	New Girl	Stranger	1 episode
2012	CSI: NY	Darius Cole	1 episode
2012	MyMusic	Lenny's Dad	1 episode
2012	The Mentalist	Phil Rawson	1 episode
2013	Bones	Nick Bennett	1 episode
2013	Longmire	Riley Manning	1 episode
2013	The Cheerleader Diaries	Coach Eugene Hines	6 episodes
2008-2013	CSI: Crime Scene Investigation	Gerald Tolliver / Rudy	3 episodes
2014	True Detective	Charlie Lange	2 episodes
2014	Perception	Gary Williams	1 episode
2014	Sons of Anarchy	Leland Gruen	4 episodes
2014	Ascension	John Stokes	3 episodes - miniseries
2014-2015	Preface to Being Jaded	Homeless Man	2 episodes
2018	I'm Poppy	Able Abraham	Lead role
2021	Yellowstone	Checkers	2 episodes
2022	Ozark	Deputy Ronnie Wycoff	3 episodes
2025	The Runarounds	Dex	1 episodes
2026	9-1-1: Nashville	Willy Davis	1 episode

=== Video games ===
Year	Title	Role
2010	Red Dead Redemption	Deputy Marshal Jonah
2010	Red Dead Redemption: Undead Nightmare	Deputy Marshal Jonah
2026	Grand Theft Auto VI	Donnie Carter
