= 100 (2008 film) =

- Film poster
- Directed by: Chris Martinez
- Written by: Chris Martinez
- Produced by: Marlon Rivera; Chris Martinez
- Starring: Mylene Dizon; Eugene Domingo; Tessie Tomas; TJ Trinidad; Ryan Eigenmann; Simon Ibarra; Cecile Paz
- Cinematography: Larry Manda
- Edited by: Ike Veneracion
- Distributed by: Cinemalaya
- Release date: December 3, 2008
- Running time: 116 minutes
- Country: Philippines
- Languages: Tagalog; English

100 is a 2008 Filipino drama film written and directed by Chris Martinez and co-produced by Marlon Rivera. The films stars Mylene Dizon who portrays the role of a woman terminally-ill with cancer and had about 100 days or about three months to live. She set for herself various tasks to accomplish in her final days.

In 2010, it was named as one of the top 10 films released in 2009 by ABS-CBN News.

== Synopsis ==
After learning that she has only 3 months left to live, Joyce, a cancer stricken woman decides to rearrange her priorities in life by shifting her energy into fulfilling her to do wish list.

== Cast ==
- Mylene Dizon as Joyce De Leon
- Eugene Domingo as Ruby
- Tessie Tomas as Eloisa
- TJ Trinidad as Rod
- Ryan Eigenmann as Emil
- Simon Ibarra as Gilbert
- Cecile Paz as Me-an

== Critical response ==
According to pep.ph, 100 is a "quiet, sometimes hilarious, bittersweet movie." and "neither quirky, nor hysterical.

== Accolades ==
| Year | Award-Giving Body | Category | Recipient | Result |
|---|---|---|---|---|
| 2008 | Cinemalaya | Best Director | Chris Martinez | Won |
| 2008 | Cinemalaya | Best Actress | Mylene Dizon | Won |
| 2008 | Cinemalaya | Best Supporting Actress | Eugene Domingo | Won |
| 2008 | Cinemalaya | Screenplay | Chris Martinez | Won |
