= Coldwater (film) =

- Directed by: Vincent Grashaw
- Written by: Vincent Grashaw; Mark Penney
- Produced by: Kris Dorrance; Dave Gare; Vincent Grashaw
- Starring: P.J. Boudousqué; James C. Burns; Chris Petrovski; Octavius J. Johnson; Nicholas Bateman; Stephanie Simbari
- Cinematography: Jayson Crothers
- Edited by: Eddie Mikasa
- Music by: Chris Chatham; Mark Miserocchi
- Release dates: March 10, 2013 (SXSW); August 15, 2014
- Running time: 104 minutes
- Country: United States
- Language: English
- Budget: $700,000

Coldwater is a 2013 independent film, directed by Vincent Grashaw, from a screenplay written by Grashaw and Mark Penney.

== Plot ==
Coldwater tells the story of abused teenaged inmates of a "wilderness rehabilitation" facility in California. Run by a former Marine, Colonel Frank Reichert, who suffers from chronic alcoholism, after his wife left him for her yoga teacher and son committed suicide at the end of his second tour. Reichert has hand picked his staff members who are either former military or ex residents/graduates of the facility. Rather than make any attempt at true rehabilitation, the residents are instead subjected to the whims of the staff, who take a might makes right approach in an attempt to break the inmates.

The story centers around Brad Lunders, a teenager who has a tenuous relationship with his mother and her new boyfriend, incarcerated for low level drug dealing and for his role in the death of his girlfriend Erin. Brad's best friend, Gabriel, joins him there later after he is sent to the same camp. Conflict develops between Brad and Josh, a staff member, which intensifies after an inmate is maimed and permanently injured during an ethically questionable, overnight punishment where they are left handcuffed to a ceiling. During Brad's time at Coldwater, he manages to escape, but is returned to Coldwater by a sheriff's deputy who is concerned by what Brad tells him has been occurring there. The deputy is nonetheless forced to return Brad to Coldwater.

Following the injury to the inmate, which initiated a lawsuit and an investigation by his superiors, Reichert's alcoholism becomes worse, and he begins day drinking. With a lack of proper leadership, the staff "turn up the heat" on the inmates, who push back. Josh loses his cool one day, and angrily challenges Brad to a fight. Despite being younger, Brad is larger, stronger and a better fighter, and quickly beats Josh into submission and only the intervention of other staff members keeps him from more severe injury. Josh is further humiliated the next day after a vehicle containing a drunken Colonel Reichert runs out of gas, and Josh is tasked with refilling it, only to find the gas can had been filled with water. Josh is forced to help push the car back to camp, while Brad sits in the drivers seat, steering. Meanwhile, Reichert passes out drunk in the passenger seat.

While putting the drunken Reichert to bed, Brad steals a master key, allowing him access to the entire facility. Meanwhile, biding for time, but unable to include anyone in his plans, he reports Gabriel as the one behind the water-in-the-gascan prank. Having regained the trust of the staff, Brad moves around the facility collecting evidence of abuse.

That night, Brad frees Gabriel from the torture shed, and steals the medical files which detail injuries to each inmate. He then combines each medical file with his own notes about what he observed happening, and mails them to the sheriff's department using a mail drop at the end of a hiking trail. The next day, the inmates rise up against the staff, killing them. Brad follows Reichert to his office and shoots him dead, posing the scene as a suicide.

The film ends with Brad being released from police custody without charge, at which time he is picked up by his mother while the news media show footage of the carnage that occurred at Coldwater.

== Cast ==
- P.J. Boudousqué as Brad Lunders
- James C. Burns as Colonel Frank Reichert
- Chris Petrovski as Gabriel Nunez
- Octavius J. Johnson as Jonas Williams
- Nicholas Bateman as Josh Warrick
- Stephanie Simbari as Erin Rose
- Clayton LaDue as Trevor
- Mackenzie Sidwell Graff as Casey
- Chauncey Leopardi as Eddie
- Melvin Gregg as Inmate

== Development ==
Grashaw, a California native who grew up in the San Fernando Valley, but with "no connections to the industry whatsoever," wrote the first draft of the screenplay right out of high school in 1999. The idea came years prior when a friend of his was taken from his home in the middle of the night to a reform facility. When Grashaw saw him again after this experience, he had in Grashaw's words, "lost it."

Grashaw, who grew unhappy with the development of his script, describing himself as "very limited when it comes to writing," brought Mark Penney aboard in 2003 for a page 1 rewrite.

The new script nearly became a movie in 2004 starring Ron Perlman and Lucas Black. When the film fell apart, Grashaw said "it was devastating." Penney and Grashaw would continue to rewrite and polish their screenplay for almost a decade before it was made.

The director often said that "the making of this film has more blood on it than Passion of the Christ."

In the interim, Grashaw produced the independent film Bellflower on a shoestring budget. The movie was a sensation when it premiered at Sundance in 2011. Released in theaters that summer, it was acclaimed by such critics as Roger Ebert of the Chicago Sun-Times. Soon after, Grashaw secured independent financing for Coldwater with a cast of unknown actors.

The film was first announced in Variety on June 4, 2012.

=== Casting ===
With no prior acting credits, 24 year-old P.J. Boudousqué was cast in the lead role of 17 year-old Brad Lunders, who is taken to the Coldwater reform facility at the beginning of the movie. A musician with a passion for films, Boudousqué had evacuated to Los Angeles from New Orleans as a teenager after Hurricane Katrina and chose to study acting. After auditioning in vain for years in Hollywood, he'd almost given up on acting and L.A. before getting the call for Coldwater-- a movie casting a mere block away from where he was living in Venice. Grashaw said that Boudousqué "came into the casting room like some drifter in a Sergio Leone film. No one knew who the hell he was but he had such a presence ... we cast him off two scenes he read in the first audition. No callbacks. Totally insane. But I think we just had a gut feeling he was the guy." After Coldwater, Boudousqué would win roles in a number of high-profile television shows, including Pretty Little Liars (2013), American Horror Story (2013), and Bones (2014).

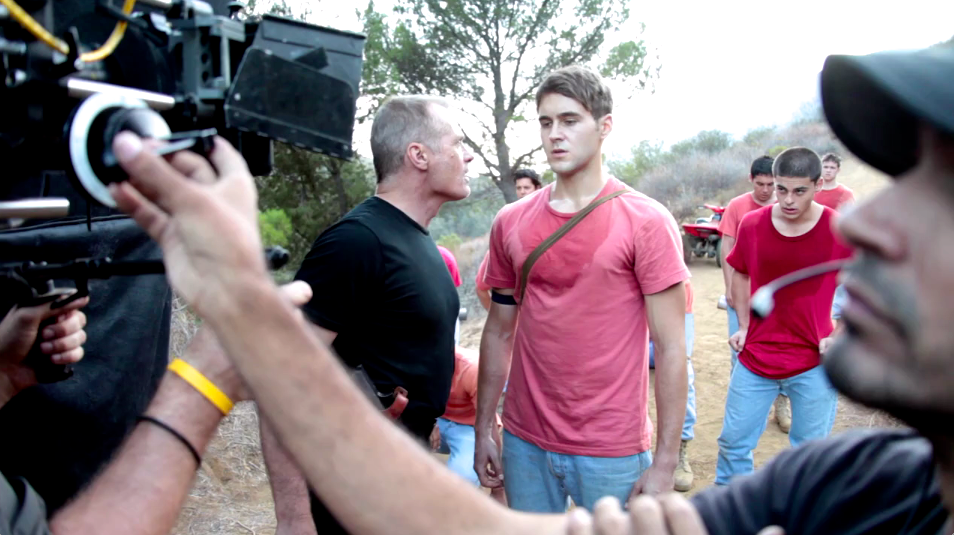
P.J. Boudousqué and James C. Burns as Brad Lunders and Colonel Frank Reichert

James C. Burns, best known in video game circles for his performance capture and voicing of Sergeant Frank Woods in the Call of Duty game franchise, was cast as retired marine colonel Frank Reichert in charge of the Coldwater facility. Burns had a long resume playing tough military types, spending much time with cops and marines for his work, even traveling with the USO show to Afghanistan to visit the troops. Burns also credited his many years as a hockey coach working with at-risk youth for helping him to nuance and interpret his role. Burns said he came to the Coldwater audition exhausted from Call of Duty and was not able to memorize his sides, and so did improv with Grashaw instead. Burns felt he'd blown his chance, but the improv was enough to win him the role. Initially that role was more of a toxic character, but Burns was instrumental in reshaping the Colonel to be more sympathetic, ultimately becoming a mirror for the character played by Boudousqué. During shooting, Penney and Grashaw would rewrite entire scenes in collaboration with Burns, often on the same day they were shot.

== Production ==
Coldwater went before the cameras in August, September, and October 2012.

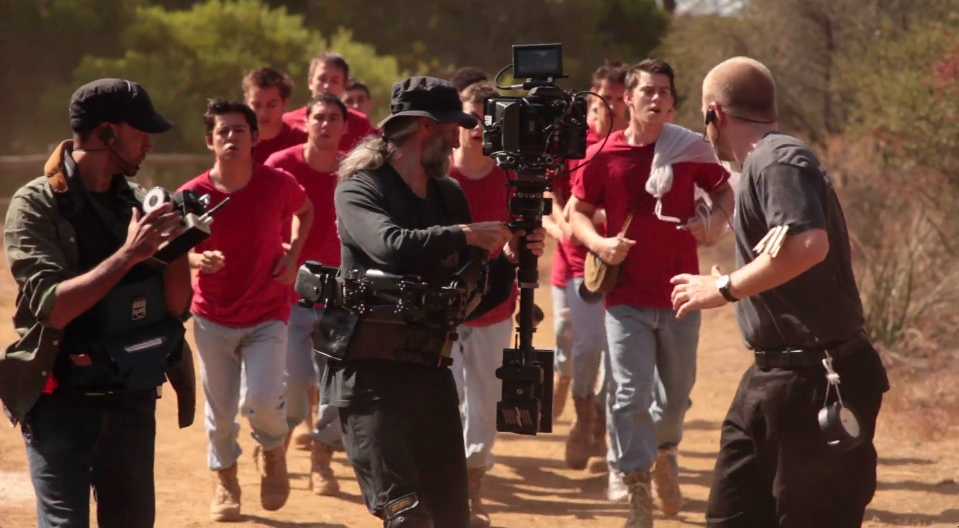
Filming at Camp Bloomfield, Summer 2012

Some sequences were shot in Ventura, Ojai, Santa Paula, and Oxnard, California but production primarily took place in the early fall at Camp Bloomfield, a valley camp for the blind and disabled in the canyons of Malibu, California, where the cast and crew lived together in newly vacant dormitories for three weeks with no cellphone or internet service. The cast and crew became close knit, often spending evenings together around the campfire after long days of exhaustive outdoor shooting. The joyous camaraderie on set stood in stark contrast to the harshness of the subject matter captured for the film.

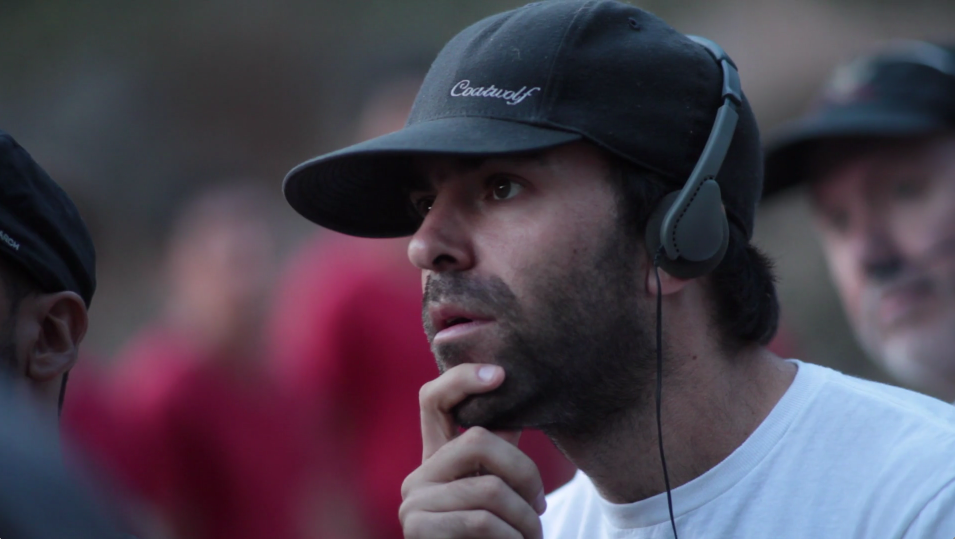
Director Vincent Grashaw on set

Grashaw said of this experience: "For a filmmaker it was a luxury. You have all the actors at your disposal any time day or night. We had an editor on set editing rough cuts of everything we were shooting. I could go to our composers who were part of the process and we could literally start throwing on a temp score while on set, in the woods." And saying later, "The movie is dark and crazy, and it looks brutal, but we had the most fun making this! People [who worked on the film] still compare this movie to every other movie they're on, "Well it's not Coldwater!" Creatively, you could do anything."

=== Post-production ===
The movie was primarily written and shot as a linear narrative, with the main character's pre-reform camp life of self-destruction comprising the first act of the film. The first cut screened for the cast and crew even maintained this structure, but it was felt that the linear style lacked a strong enough element of discovery. Before its premiere at SXSW the decision was made to remove the first act and begin the film blind with Brad's abduction to the Coldwater facility. The removed footage was broken up and carefully inserted as flashbacks throughout the character's first year of incarceration, having the effect of triggered memories that reveal in increments the pain and turmoil the main character is carrying through the story, as well as progressively revealing the tragic events that landed him at the facility in the first place. This significantly increased the depth and suspense of the film's first half, and in Grashaw's words, "brought the film to a whole other level for us."

== Release ==
Coldwater made its world premiere at the 2013 South by Southwest Film Festival in Austin, Texas.

After SXSW it screened internationally and domestically in several other festivals, including: Champs-Élysées Film Festival in Paris, France; Shanghai International Film Festival in China; Galway Film Fleadh in Ireland; Reykjavík International Film Festival in Iceland; Raindance Film Festival in London, England; Sitges Film Festival in Spain; Leiden International Film Festival in the Netherlands; American Film Festival in Poland; Athens Film Festival in Greece; Fresh Film Festival in the Czech Republic; Tallinn Black Nights Film Festival in Estonia; and in the USA: Little Rock Film Festival in Arkansas; Cinema At The Edge Film Festival in Santa Monica; Indianapolis International Film Festival; Sidewalk Film Festival in Alabama; Boston Film Festival; Las Vegas International Film Festival; California Independent Film Festival.

The film was specially selected to screen at the 2013 Survivors of Institutional Abuse (SIA) Convention in Washington, D.C.

Coldwater was released theatrically in the United States, France, and Toronto, Ontario, Canada in the summer of 2014. It has also been released in the United Kingdom, Russia, Germany, Poland, Spain, Netherlands, Turkey, and South Korea.

To date the film has been subtitled into more than 20 languages, including Chinese, Greek, and Hebrew.

Coldwater was released on DVD in the United States in November 2014, and on Blu-ray in January 2016. The DVD included a making-of featurette. The movie was also released on DVD & special edition Blu-ray in Germany in August 2014, and France in January 2015. It was released on DVD in Spain in May 2017.

The film was released on Movie Central's YouTube channel in 2023, with a quarter of a million views to date.

A Russian-dubbed upload of the film to YouTube in 2014 has half a million views.

As of May 2021, the full version of Coldwater was in release on iTunes, Amazon Prime, FandangoNow, Vudu, Tubi, and Peacock.

== Reception ==
=== Independent criticism ===
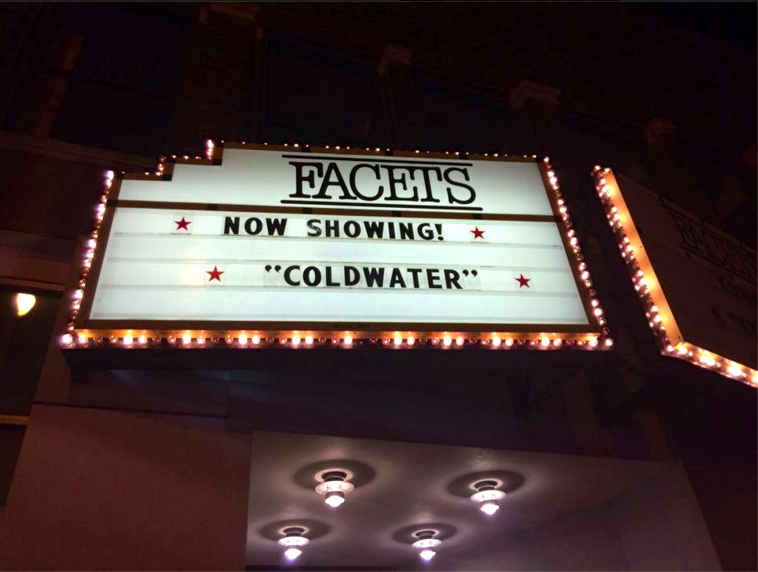
Facets Cinémathèque, Chicago 2014

Coldwater received almost universal acclaim from independent film critics from dozens of outlets beginning with its World Premiere at SXSW. (Paste magazine, Flixist, and Complex all listed the movie in their breakdowns of Best Films at SXSW). Reviewers praised the film's emotional impact, uncompromising critique of the abuse of power, and stark portrayal of juvenile delinquency. Critics also pointed to the movie's inventive use of dramatic, thriller, prison-film and even horror genre elements in combination with its topical themes and sociological exposé, as well as its gritty realism in direction and photography, non-linear storytelling, haunting musical score, and strong performances from a cast of unknown actors.

Larry411's Independent Film Analysis gave a 5/5-star review, saying Coldwater "truly defines what can be achieved in cinema when the filmmakers are calling the shots," describing the film's take on the juvenile prison genre "as fresh as it is devastatingly genuine." It went further to say that "what makes this real-life horror film so gripping is that it's based on actual incidents which have been well documented across the country. Director/co-writer/producer Vincent Grashaw, with co-writer Mark Penney, have taken these true stories and crafted a powerful work that transcends the genre and leaves the viewer emotionally drained."

Playmaker Magazine's A+ score the night of Coldwater's SXSW premiere called it "a compelling and emotional ride, easily worthy of being named the best movie at the festival." Concurring also that the film "is grounded in reality, which is why the emotions felt by the characters and the audience are so real. This kind of abuse happens all the time in reform facilities in the US."

Complex scored Coldwater an 8/10, saying "Grashaw's intense debut generates the highest level of raw suspense." Finding it "accomplished and dealing out powerful damage," with the "storytelling maturity, gripping pace, and grade-A performances (from a group of unknown actors) that one would find in a veteran's third or fourth movie."

The Critical Critics' 5/5 review said the film delivered "with a sincerity few others achieve."

The Film Stage's B+ review predicted it "would render any parent who ever thought of voluntarily sending their kid away to one of these establishments moot."

BT News Network called the film "a harrowingly haunting motion picture," that "incites thought and debate – two things that too few films are daring enough to do."

Horror staple magazine Fangoria found Coldwater to be "a satisfying, lasting, and chilling experience."

Warren Cole Smith for the politically conservative World News Mag wrote: "Think Cool Hand Luke meets Pulp Fiction, with a touch of The Shawshank Redemption thrown in. If these comparisons sound dismissive, I don't mean them to be. I consider all three of these movies to be excellent, and Coldwater deserves to be mentioned in the same sentence."

John Jarzemsky of Screen Anarchy gave the film a negative review, finding the script "a bit too self-conscious of its own moral outrage," and lamenting the film's "appeals to raw emotion and visceral discomfort." Jarzemsky warns that "Coldwater insists on ratcheting all engines to 11 from the word go," and that "Grashaw and Penney seem convinced that the only way to truly make the criticisms in Coldwater resonate is to continually up the ante, resulting in a kind of thematic assault that leaves the audience cold."

=== France ===
Coldwater received mostly positive reviews from critics in France when it was released theatrically in that country in July 2014. Meilleurs Films would rank Coldwater number 4 on their list of top 20 films of the year, and SensCritique would include Coldwater in its top 10 films of the year.

Grashaw said that while American audiences seemed desensitized to revelations of juvenile institutional abuses in the US, European audiences like those in France were in shocked disbelief at the injustices on display in the film (and that facilities like Coldwater could exist at all), with several passionate inquiries after screenings.

The week after its theatrical release in France, cinema audiences on AlloCiné rated Coldwater the number 1 film to see in the country.

=== Mainstream US criticism ===
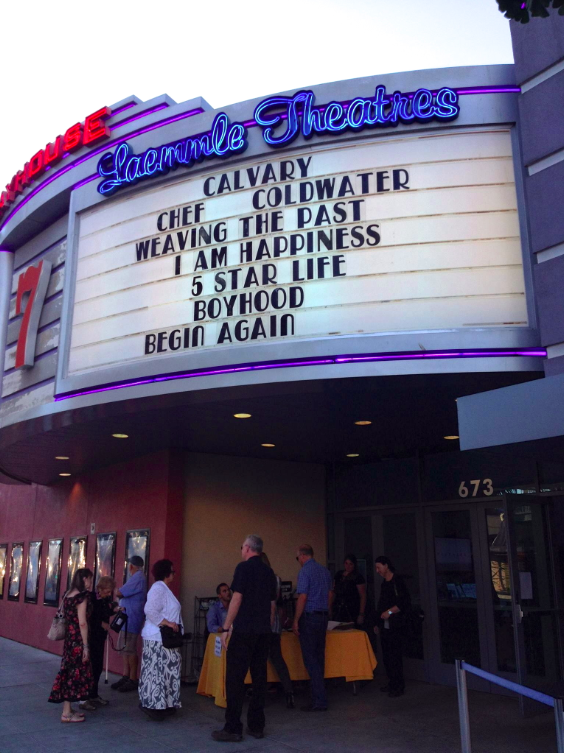
Laemmle Playhouse, Pasadena California, August 2014

Coldwater was more divisive for mainstream US critics when it was released in American theaters in August 2014. Rotten Tomatoes scored it 64% based on 22 critics, with Metacritic assigning a score of 45/100 based on 13 critics. Negative reviews from critics focused on the film's violence, teenage anti-hero theme, and dark, tragic tone:

The New York Times critic Jeannette Catsoulis writes that Coldwater was "Punishing" and "Proceeding in a tone of unrelieved misery ... full of scenes of unremitting brutality and sadism, as the thuggish guards set about transforming their charges into model citizens." She went on to say that this "brutal tale of juvenile lockup" with its "cramped hellhole of Darwinian violence" is "too unvaryingly grim to draw us in, unfolding with hardly a moment of warmth or human connection." The film was, "like Brad's detention, simply to be endured."

Variety's Top critic Peter Debruge called Coldwater an "indignant expose" with "shower scenes and sweaty young delinquents aplenty." In discussing the main juvenile character, Debruge states,"Coldwater is the story of what happens to a baby-faced hunk after his mom sends him to a juvenile rehabilitation facility. Never mind that he sells drugs, starts fights at parties and is directly responsible for the death of an innocent friend. As played by heartthrob-in-the-making P.J. Boudousqué, the character is evidently just too cute to deserve rehabilitation ... would we be so forgiving if he didn't look like a former Mouseketeer?"

Slant Magazine's Elise Nakhnikian criticizes the film's choice to root its perspective with the adolescent inmates: "There's a certain kind of fantasy, appealing to teenagers, that involves imagining yourself in a situation harsh enough to justify the alienation and rage flooding your soul. The attraction is the perverse satisfaction of enduring nightmarish scenarios, no matter how high the deck is stacked against you." Indignant herself, she awarded the film only one star for what she called "its melodramatic mixture of grandiosity and powerlessness to its view of the world as a torture-chamber crucible for an angry young man who has to grow up too fast."

The Hollywood Reporter, Entertainment Weekly, The Playlist, The Wall Street Journal, and the National Post, all reviewed Coldwater favorably.

The Hollywood Reporter's Top critic John DeFore's positive review of Coldwater said: "Affecting drama exposes a brutal real world phenomenon." DeFore highlighted the mix of genre elements with social relevance, writing that Grashaw "and co-screenwriter Mark Penney introduce incidents that tie the story to prison films of the past, then gradually exploit the novelty of this setting, heightening the mood of isolation with glimpses of outside authorities who should be able to see what's going on here and intervene, but fail to in sometimes wrenching ways. The script's dramatic finale is shockingly violent but just within the bounds of the credible, an eruption of justified rage that speaks for the real-world youths (dozens since 1980, according to closing titles) who have died in juvenile rehab centers the government refuses to monitor."

== Awards ==
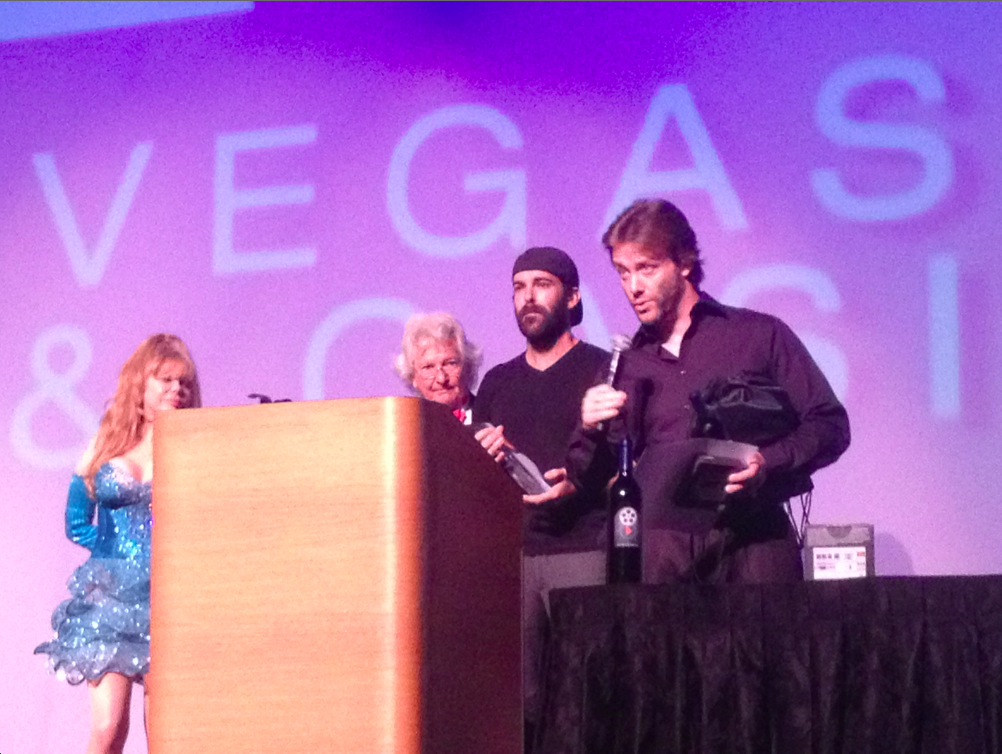
Vincent Grashaw and Mark Penney accepting the Grand Jury Award for Best Feature at the Las Vegas Film Festival, July 2013

Coldwater garnered several award nominations during its worldwide festival run, many for Best Feature Film.

It won Best Film, Best Director (Vincent Grashaw), and Best Actor (P.J. Boudousqué) at the Las Vegas International Film Festival and went on to win the Audience Awards for Best Feature at the Fresh Film Festival in Prague, Czech Republic, as well as at the Cinema at the Edge Film Festival in Santa Monica, California.

Coldwater's award nominations include Best Film Exposé and Best Film on Human Rights of 2014 by the Political Film Society, a nonprofit corporation formed to recognize the ability of films to raise consciousness of political concerns throughout the world. Coldwater was nominated along with high-profile films The Imitation Game, Kill the Messenger, and Unbroken.
