= Ascension (miniseries) =

2014 science fiction mystery drama TV miniseries

- Genre: Science fiction; Space opera; Drama; Mystery; Speculative fiction
- Created by: Philip Levens; Adrian A. Cruz
- Starring: Tricia Helfer; Gil Bellows; Brian Van Holt; Andrea Roth; Brandon P. Bell; Ellie O'Brien; Jacqueline Byers; Tiffany Lonsdale; P.J. Boudousqué
- Composer: Trevor Morris
- Countries of origin: Canada; United States
- Original language: English
- No. of episodes: 6

Production
- Executive producers: Mark Stern; Ivan Fecan; Tim Gamble; Brett Burlock; Jason Blum; Philip Levens
- Running time: 43 minutes
- Production companies: Sea to Sky; Levens; Blumhouse Television; Universal Cable Productions; Lionsgate Television

Original release
- Network: Syfy (United States); CBC (Canada)
- Release: December 15 – December 17, 2014

Ascension is a 2014 science fiction mystery drama television miniseries which aired on CBC in Canada and Syfy in the United States. It consisted of six episodes, grouped into three chapters of two episodes each. The show was created by Philip Levens and Adrian A. Cruz. The pilot was written and executive produced by Philip Levens, who served as the showrunner.

On July 9, 2014, CBC added Ascension to its fall programming roster. It had been scheduled to premiere in November 2014.

In October 2014, CBC announced that the premiere date had been moved to January 2015.

The show started airing on CBC on Monday nights starting February 9, 2015. Syfy had announced plans to debut the show on November 24, 2014, airing one episode per week for six weeks. Instead, the series premiered on December 15, 2014, airing one chapter consisting of two episodes each night for three consecutive nights.

The story takes place aboard a generation ship launched in the 1960s and now half-way into its 100-year journey to Proxima Centauri. A murder on board sparks off a series of events that leads some of the crew to begin second-guessing their real mission.

== Plot ==
In 1963 and at the height of the Space Race, President John F. Kennedy and the U.S. government, fearing the Cold War will escalate and lead to the destruction of Earth, launched the Ascension, an Orion-class spaceship, to colonize a planet orbiting Proxima Centauri, assuring the survival of the human race.

The USS Ascension is a massive, self-sustaining generation ship. The journey will take 100 years, so only the children and grandchildren of the original crew of 600 volunteers will be alive when they arrive.

The story begins 51 years into their journey (i.e., in the present), as they approach the point of no return (when the ship would flip and begin the deceleration to their final destination, after which time they would have insufficient fuel to initiate a return trip). The action begins with the mysterious murder of a young woman – the first homicide since the Ascension was launched.

The investigation causes some of the ship's crew to question the true nature of their mission.

== Cast and characters ==
=== Main ===
- Tricia Helfer as Viondra Denninger, a beautiful, manipulative and dangerous power broker on the Ascension. As the Captain's wife, Viondra is afforded a position of power and privilege, which she leverages as the ship's Chief Stewardess.
- Gil Bellows as Harris Enzmann, son of Abraham Enzmann, the founder of the Ascension mission, who is determined to continue his father's work back on Earth.
- Brian Van Holt as Captain William Denninger, commanding officer, who is married to Viondra. While his professional life appears solid, William's marriage to Viondra is anything but.
- Andrea Roth as Dr. Juliet Bryce, Chief Medical Officer of the Ascension.
- Brandon P. Bell as executive officer Aaron Gault, professional, confident, and capable, born to maintenance workers on the ship's lower decks. He must investigate the aforementioned murder.
- Ellie O'Brien as Christa Valis, a child with extraordinary abilities.
- Jacqueline Byers as Nora Bryce, Juliet's daughter, a young woman who is under intense familial pressure to follow her mother by apprenticing at the medical center but instead finds herself drawn to the Terraforming Department and the promise of building a new world.
- Tiffany Lonsdale as Chief Astronomer Emily Vanderhaus, the older sister of the murder victim, whose rocky marriage to Safety Officer Duke Vanderhaus will be put to the test by this family tragedy.
- P. J. Boudousqué as James Toback, one of the ship's maintenance workers and Nora's love interest.

=== Supporting ===
- Mark Camacho as Martin Carillo
- Brad Carter as Stockyard Master John Stokes.
- Rachael Crawford as Ophelia, the ship's librarian
- Wendy Crewson as Director Katherine Warren
- Lauren Lee Smith as Samantha Krueger, an investigator on Earth.
- Spiro Malandrakis as Nixon
- Robert Naylor as Matthew
- John Ralston as Dr. Robert Bryce
- Ryan Robbins as Chief Safety Officer Duke Vanderhaus, who is married to Emily Vanderhaus.
- Al Sapienza as Councilman Rose
- Jessica Sipos as Jackie North, a stewardess who has begun sleeping with the captain.
- Amanda Thomson as Lorelei Wright, the murder victim.
- Elias Toufexis as Mark Hayes
- Cynthia Preston as Laura Enzmann
- Hannah Saunders as Alison
- Lauren Suthers as a student
- Sylvia Stewart as Young Gault's Mother
- Adam Bernett as Ike Messmer

== Episodes ==
No.	Title	Directed by	Written by	Original release date	US viewers (millions)
1	"Chapter One, Part 1"	Stephen Williams	Story by : Philip Levens & Adrian A. Cruz; Teleplay by : Philip Levens	December 15, 2014	1.76
During celebrations of the 51st year of its 100 year journey through space, a murder occurs among those aboard the U.S. Orion Class spaceship Ascension. Captain William Denninger asks Executive Officer Aaron Gault to investigate. On Earth, Harris Enzmann is confronted by an academic who asks about the "Ascension Project," but Enzmann states the project doesn't exist. Eva Marceau is seen researching the "Ascension Project" as well. Christa, Lorelei's adolescent friend who went into shock upon finding the body, receives treatment from ship's Chief Medical Officer Juliet Bryce. Gault visits Ophelia looking for books about solving murders. Ophelia mentions that Lorelei checked out a video from Year 31 but only returned its case.
2	"Chapter One, Part 2"	Stephen Williams	Story by : Phillip Levens & Adrian A. Cruz; Teleplay by : Philip Levens	December 15, 2014	1.76
As Gault searches the lower decks, he finds a notebook with writings discussing an insurrection. Toback and Nora go diving in the pool to find Lorelei's video card. When a radiation storm approaches, forcing everyone into sedated sleep in protected locations, someone in a masked suit steals Dr. Bryce's seahorse necklace, not aware that Christa is groggily watching. Stokes' lower deck headquarters is raided and the gun that killed Lorelei is found, sending Stokes to the brig. As Gault confronts Denninger with the compass, he is shocked to learn that Denninger had an affair with Lorelei. Stokes suddenly enters and shoots at Gault, but the gun does not fire. Stokes gets sucked out an airlock, only to land on a pad. He is drugged and taken away. Ascension is revealed to be a structure kept in a large building on Earth. Enzmann has continued his father's work, the populace of Ascension have unknowingly been a closely watched experiment for 51 years. The TC group increases pressure on Enzmann for results.
3	"Chapter Two, Part 1"	Vincenzo Natali	Philip Levens	December 16, 2014	1.33
Stokes, ejected from Ascension and believed to be dead by those aboard, is now being held by those running the experiment. Enzmann is told that Project Director Katherine Warren has assigned Samantha, a security consultant who does not yet know the full extent of the experiment, to try to solve the murder from the outside. Samantha confronts Enzmann about the project, and he reveals all by showing her the video feeds from the ship and asking her, if she were born on Ascension, would she want to know the truth. An act of sabotage causes an explosion on the ship, with Dr. Bryce and Nora treating multiple victims. Bryce confronts Nora about her attraction to "lower-decker" James. Councilman Rose reminds Viondra that he might be able to wrest the powerful Captaincy away from her husband. While searching for a missing cobalt generator capable of causing another explosion, Gault is knocked out by an unknown assailant. James asks Gault to help him get into a program that would get him out of the lower decks, then offers to help him find Dwight, a suspect in Lorelei's murder, by telling him to check Deck 23. In a flashback, Ophelia saved a childhood Gault's life when Deck 23 was damaged in a fire 20 years ago. Deck 23 is so damaged, now, that anyone could probably hear activity in the facility. Gault senses something near the ship's hull, at the exact spot where Enzmann stands on the other side. Dwight suddenly attacks Gault, who escapes the damaged area as Dwight dies. Enzmann goes to the warehouse to get the seahorse necklace that Christa witnessed being taken from Bryce's office, and gives it to his wife.
4	"Chapter Two, Part 2"	Rob Lieberman	Adrian A. Cruz	December 16, 2014	1.33
On the ship, Christa is in line to be immunized. Ophelia accompanies her to prove that nothing is wrong with the shots. Ophelia takes the shot herself, has a seizure, and collapses. Looking on, Enzmann insists that Christa must get the shot soon or her system will start breaking down. Meanwhile, Samantha meets with conspiracy theorist Eve Marceau, who tells her that 70 scientists were abducted in the 1960s, along with gifted children, one of whom is later shown to be Ophelia. On the ship, Viondra learns that Jackie, one of the stewardesses, has begun having sex with the captain. She relieves Jackie of her duties. When Enzmann tries to get Christa to take her inoculations through a glass of milk, she looks up at the camera and dumps it on the floor. Enzmann tells them to use their "man inside" to make her take the inoculation. Christa panics, screams, and shatters the lights, but the "man inside" also cuts himself and bleeds on her dress. Viondra learns that someone squelched her order to have Jackie transferred. Gault talks with Christa about her inoculations and gets her to take them, but when Dr. Robert Bryce arrives to give her the shot, she refuses, and he holds her down and injects her. When the DNA evidence on Christa's dress gets matched to Ike, the medical intern, he is found hanging dead in his room. Nora and James meet on the beach to talk. They admit to liking each other, but he ultimately resents her for making him feel poor. Finally, Christa visits Ophelia, who is in a coma, and tells her that "it's not true. You're not dying."
5	"Chapter Three, Part 1"	Mairzee Almas	Melody Fox	December 17, 2014	1.50
The ship celebrates "Ostara," a unique birth ritual where everyone learns who is allowed to have a baby to keep the ship's population at 600. Meanwhile, Christa follows a ghostly figure, who resembles Lorelei, laughing down the hall to the party. Viondra announces three couples' names, one of which is Duke and Emily Vanderhaus. The "ghost" tells Christa to look away when a video plays showing Lorelei having sex with the captain. Later, Viondra and William argue over the video. Councilman Rose tells the captain that he needs to step down, insulting Viondra in the process, and they fight. Dr. Bryce asks Christa to have an MRI. In the compound, Samantha steals Enzmann's henchman Carrillo's keycard. She later visits Stokes, who is preparing to escape. Director Katherine Warren arrives, not happy with Samantha's report. On the ship, Viondra has the girls prepare the dorms for an inspection, and Jackie goes to the captain. He asks her to deliver extra rations to a woman and an "unclaimed," a child born out of wedlock. With Samantha as his hostage, Stokes leads her through the compound. They enter the room where the Ascension is held, and he has a breakdown upon seeing it. He wonders how it is possible that they landed; Samantha tells him that they never left. On board, Gault continues the murder investigation to learn that the video appears to have been uploaded by the captain. Duke leaves Emily when she confirms her affair with Gault. As Samantha tries to help Stokes escape, Warren takes over the Ascension project by having Enzmann escorted out and relieved of duty. Carrillo remains her second-in-command. Meanwhile, Stokes finds the memorial for fallen members of the "Ascension," including his son, Dwight. Back on the ship, the Captain is brought up on charges for having an unclaimed, but he reveals that the child is that of another of the council members. "Lorelei" leads Christa to a fight between Gault and Duke. Christa shocks Duke with a surge of energy that radiates out from the ship and affects everyone.
6	"Chapter Three, Part 2"	Nicholas Copus	Philip Levens	December 17, 2014	1.50
A security guard shoots Samantha. Director Warren accuses Enzmann of creating the energy surge but he excitedly tells her that it is likely from Christa, confirming that the Ascension experiment is working and they have created a valuable advance in human evolution. She gives Enzmann his job back but tells Carrillo that Enzmann will be killed once the technical problems on Ascension are repaired. On the ship, people are panicking, system computers are down, strange messages (modern television signals) are appearing on computer screens and a breakdown of the air scrubber controls has on board carbon dioxide rising towards fatal levels. Fearing that the carbon dioxide will soon kill everyone on the ship, Warren sends an operative named Medici in to bring out Christa and her valuable powers. With Captain Denninger and XO Gault off the bridge and Chief Councilman Rose missing, the bridge crew inform Viondra that she is in command. Outside, Samantha takes Stokes to a motel to deal with her gunshot wound. She contacts Eva to help her and Stokes to escape and to expose the Ascension project. When Stokes expresses a desire to return to Ascension, Samantha and Eva calm him, though Eva commits a minor slip, giving herself away as a honey trap working to protect the project. She kills Samantha and looks to kill Stokes, who has escaped into the night. Dr. Robert Bryce, Enzmann's inside man, has been warned by Enzmann that Medici is entering the ship and reveals to Christa that he was Lorelei's murderer. Medici quickly overpowers Bryce when the doctor tries to protect Christa. Gault has another vision of Lorelei and is drawn to protect Christa, leaving the captain to fix the carbon dioxide problem. As Gault and Medici fight, a scared Christa conjures another of her power surges and Medici and Gault disappear. Director Warren is furious and as she tries to contact Medici inside, Enzmann pushes her off a platform to her death. Enzmann tells Carrillo the true intent of the project is now working and Christa's new powers mean that everyone on board really is "going to space", as Gault is shown alone, seemingly on another planet with two suns in the sky, much as the ship's presumed destination, Proxima Centauri, had been described.

== Development and production ==
On March 13, 2014, came the official announcement that Syfy had ordered Ascension as a six-part miniseries. Syfy billed Ascension as a "6-hour event series".

=== Producers and studios ===
Ascension is an original sci-fi mystery drama created and written by Philip Levens who serves as executive producer and showrunner. The series is produced in Montreal, Quebec, Canada, by Canada-based Sea to Sky Studios in association with U.S.-based Blumhouse Productions. It is co-financed and distributed by U.S.-based Universal Cable Productions and Canada-based Lionsgate Television.

Jason Blum and Mark Stern are executive producers on the project along with Ivan Fecan, Tim Gamble, and Brett Burlock.

=== Casting ===
On April 30, 2014, Syfy announced that Tricia Helfer would star as Viondra Denninger. On June 3, 2014, Brian Van Holt was announced to star as Captain William Denninger.

On June 24, 2014, Brandon P. Bell, Tiffany Lonsdale, and Jacqueline Byers were announced to co-star alongside Helfer and Van Holt, as First Officer Oren Gault, Chief Astronomer Emily Vanderhaus, and Nora Bryce respectively, and two days later, Andrea Roth and P.J. Boudousque joined the main cast as Dr. Juliet Bryce and James Toback respectively.

On July 7, 2014, Ryan Robbins joined the main cast as Safety Officer Duke Vanderhaus, and two days later, Gil Bellows joined the main cast as Harris Enzmann. Later the same day, Wendy Crewson was announced to guest star in an as yet unspecified role (which was ultimately that of Director Katherine Warren).

=== Filming ===
The series began shooting on July 7, 2014, in Montreal. Canadian director Stephen Williams directed the first two episodes.

=== Promotion ===
The first promotional teaser-trailer was released on May 15, 2014, at the 2014 NBCUniversal Cable Upfront Presentation. The trailer is available for viewing on the official page of Ascension on Syfy's website.

On July 14, 2014, executive producer and showrunner Phil Levens and executive producer Jason Blum appeared at the Television Critics Association (TCA) summer press tour to talk about the new series bringing along the principal stars of the show, Brian Van Holt and Tricia Helfer, to field questions from the ballroom of critics. (see below: Comments by the cast and crew)

On October 13, 2014, the network announced that instead of airing as a weekly series for six weeks, Ascension would air as a three-night "event" starting on December 15, 2014, with two of the six episodes airing each of three consecutive nights.

=== Potential future seasons ===
Although the show was ordered as a miniseries, it could have continued, similar to the network's popular series Battlestar Galactica. On March 10, 2015, Syfy announced that they would not be producing more episodes, "We were very happy with Ascension as an event series, but with so much high profile development in the works, we have decided not to pursue a full series".

== Comments by the cast and crew ==
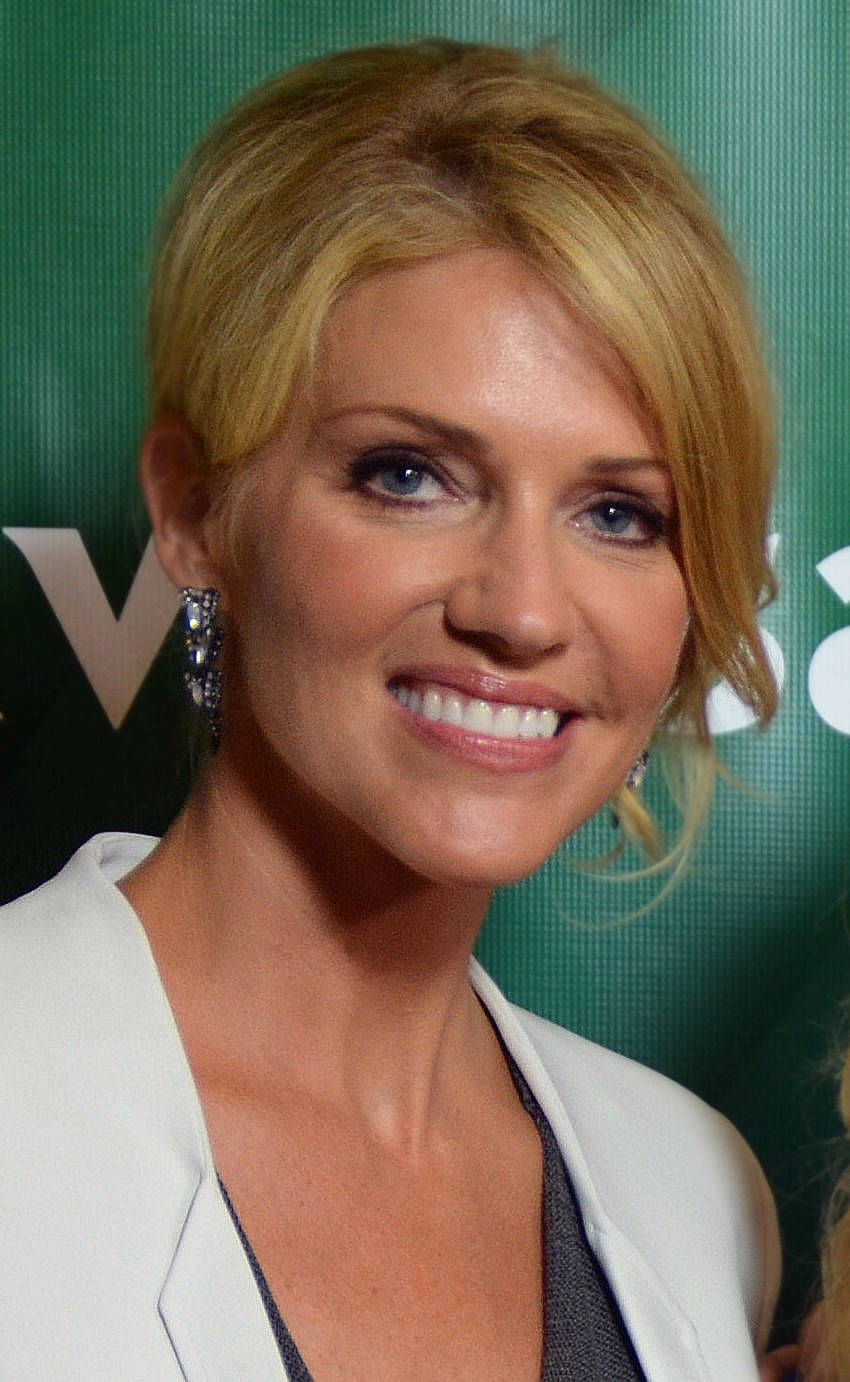

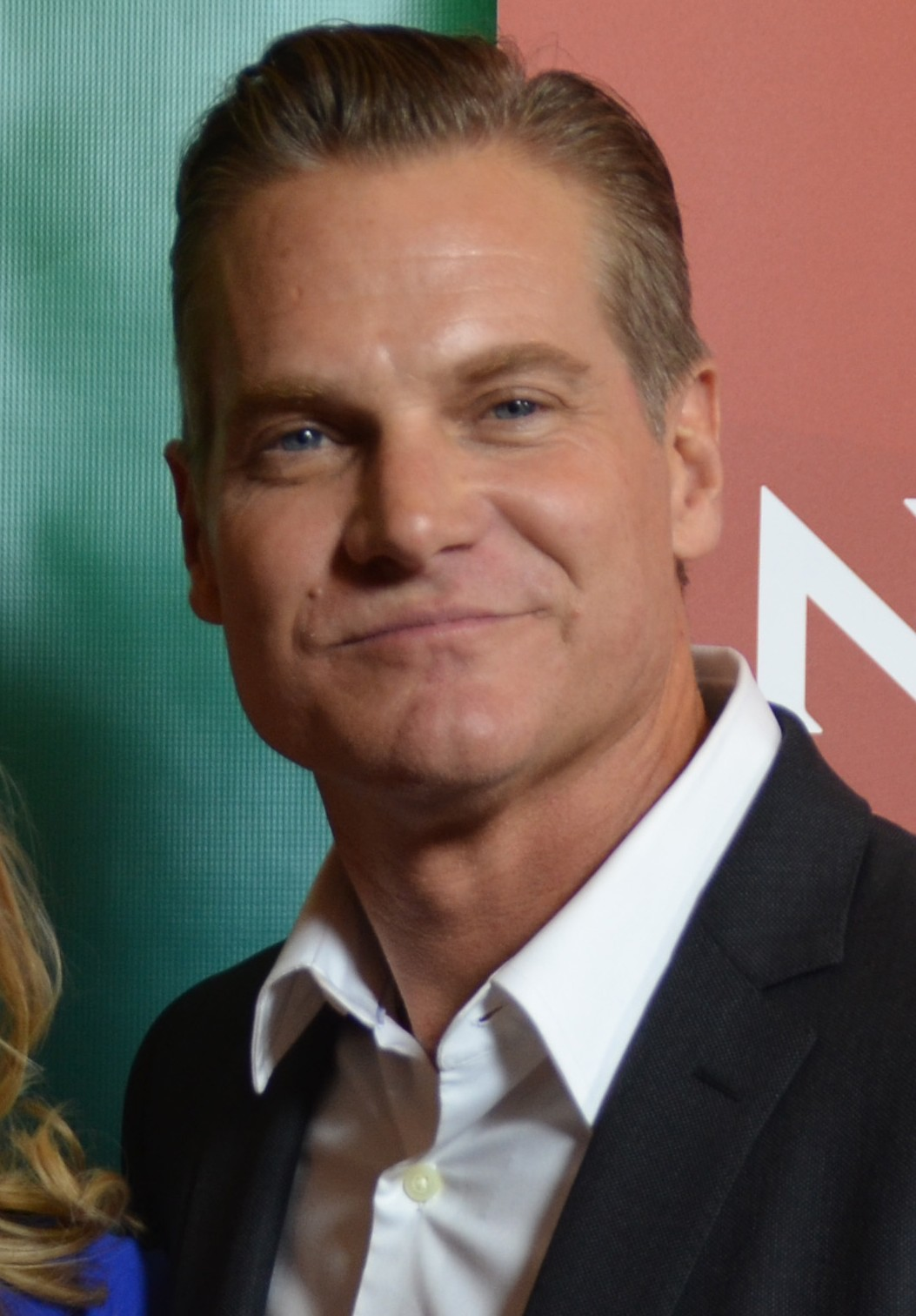
Tricia Helfer (top) and Brian Van Holt at NBCUniversal's 2014 Summer TCA Tour on July 14, 2014

Upon the official announcement, on March 13, 2014, that Syfy had picked up the miniseries, Bill McGoldrick, Executive Vice President of Original Content for Syfy stated: "Phil Levens has crafted a bold and surprising spin on the space opera. We are equally excited to embark on this journey with our partners at UCP, Sea to Sky, Lionsgate, Jason Blum and his Blumhouse Productions and also with Mark Stern who shepherded this project while at Syfy".

On July 14, 2014, at the Television Critics Association summer press tour, Jason Blum, Tricia Helfer, Philip Levens, and Brian Van Holt commented on the upcoming show.

Executive producer Jason Blum said that:

What piqued [his] interest was the originality of EP Philip Levens' story idea, which was inspired by Freeman Dyson's Project Orion to design a nuclear-propelled spacecraft. Levens pointed out that President Kennedy squashed the development of Orion soon after the Bay of Pigs as the military began equipping the spaceship with weapons. He was terrified that they were turning it into a Death Star.

About the starship he said that "it feels like a cruise ship. Essentially the ship is like a time capsule, another civilization that continued for 50 years parallel to our civilization." Blum added that:

The people on the ship, only some of their children, but most of their grandchildren, are the only people who are going to arrive at this new world. A lot of the people who started on this ship have died. It's their children, their children's children, who are going to get to where they're going. And there are a lot of conflicts going on. Should they turn around and go back to Earth, which they've lost touch with? So they have no idea of what Earth even looks like now. Should they continue? Also there's been a murder on the ship, which never happened before. So that's kind of what starts it.

Tricia Helfer said about Viondra that her "manipulative" character considers herself the "mother of the people on the ship, the mother of humanity in one way if Earth did blow itself up". "Brian [Van Holt] and I play a married couple and as the wife, I'm definitely the woman behind the man more than we would see in our society here on Earth today", Helfer added. She explained about the ship's crew that:

Their morals and the values that they're dealing with are still from the '60s. The society on the ship is very hierarchical and uses genetic linking-arranged marriages, basically to sustain human life (three generations will be born during the trip to Proxima). [My] character Viondra started out on the lower decks but rose through the ranks, as did her husband. They're a power couple. Viondra will do anything to stay in power.

Creator Philip Levens said that:

Ascension will explore how technology has evolved on the ship and the way morality is still rooted in an early '60s, pre-Civil Rights Act view [of] humanity. Issues of class – the ship is divided into decks, with people in positions of power living on the upper ones – will also come into play. There's much more of a sense of obeying your parents because, you know, for the ship to really work, everybody has to cooperate. The murder is kind of the starting of the unravelling, so to speak. And kids start to question choices made by their grandparents. There's a thing on board the ship called "the crisis". It's this existential dilemma that everyone has to go through when they realize that, you know, their life has been circumscribed for them. You know, everybody they ever know or ever will know is already around them. So there's lots of issues like that kind of play [as] a coming of age thing with the kids and their parents.

Because the series is set on a ship that is self-contained and self-sustained, the people have evolved and developed differently than they would have if they'd remained on Earth. Not only is the technology different, but they think differently, too

Brian Van Holt described his character as "a man caught in the middle, aware that his legacy as the ship's 'middle route' captain won't probably go down in the record books. The one who launches the ship and the one who lands it will be remembered. No one in the now will be remembered. So he struggles with that". He concluded by saying that "he's a very ambitious character who sought out a leadership role, which was presented to him after an act of heroism on the ship".

== Reception ==
Ascension met with mixed reviews from critics. Rotten Tomatoes gives the show a rating of 67%, based on 33 reviews, with an average rating of 5.8/10. The site's critical consensus states, "The characters in Ascension lack the depth necessary for its dramatic elements, but its premise may be smart enough to hold the interest of sci-fi fans." On Metacritic, the show has a score of 56 out of 100, based on reviews from 14 critics, indicating "mixed or average reviews".

== See also ==
- Orbiter 9
