= Lingua Franca (film) =

2019 drama film directed by Isabel Sandoval

- Theatrical release poster
- Directed by: Isabel Sandoval
- Written by: Isabel Sandoval
- Produced by: Isabel Sandoval; Jhett Tolentino; Carlo Velayo; Darlene Catly Malimas; Dax Stringer
- Starring: Isabel Sandoval; Eamon Farren; Ivory Aquino; P.J. Boudousqué; Lev Gorn; Lynn Cohen
- Cinematography: Isaac Banks
- Edited by: Isabel Sandoval
- Production company: 7107 Entertainment
- Distributed by: ARRAY (North America); TBA Studios (Philippines)
- Release dates: September 6, 2019 (Venice); August 26, 2020 (U.S.); November 20, 2020 (Philippines)
- Running time: 89 minutes
- Countries: United States; Philippines
- Languages: English; Cebuano; Filipino; Russian

Lingua Franca is a 2019 Philippine-American drama film edited, written, produced, and directed by Filipina filmmaker-actress Isabel Sandoval. It is Sandoval's third feature film, her first international co-production, her first primarily in English, and her first following her gender affirmation. The film stars Sandoval as Olivia, an undocumented Filipina trans woman who works as a caregiver for Olga, an elderly Russian-Jewish woman in Brighton Beach, Brooklyn. In pursuit of a man willing to provide a marriage-based green card to her, she worries about possible deportation by the U.S. Immigration and Customs Enforcement while becoming romantically involved with Olga's adult grandson, Alex. The film's supporting cast includes Eamon Farren, Ivory Aquino, P.J. Boudousqué, Lev Gorn, and Lynn Cohen.

Lingua Franca premiered at the Venice Days sidebar of the 76th Venice International Film Festival in 2019. In July 2020, the film was acquired by Ava DuVernay's distribution company, ARRAY, and began streaming in North American territories through Netflix on 26 August 2020. TBA Studios served as the Philippine distributor, releasing the film virtually on 20 November 2020.

Lingua Franca received nominations for the John Cassavetes Award at the 36th Independent Spirit Awards and Outstanding Film – Limited Release at the 32nd GLAAD Media Awards.

== Plot ==
Olivia is a Filipina trans woman who works as a live-in caregiver for the elderly Olga in Brooklyn's Brighton Beach neighborhood. Olga, a Russian-Jewish woman, is in the early stages of dementia and relies on Olivia to confirm her surroundings, which she initially suspects is not her own home. As an undocumented immigrant, Olivia harbors fears of being detained and deported by ICE agents at any moment. Olivia's earnings go towards supporting her family in the Philippines, in addition to installment payments to Matthew, her American-born boyfriend, with the hope of Olivia securing a green card through a marriage of convenience. Olivia's plans are disrupted just as Alex, Olga's adult grandson, arrives to come live with Olga after a stay in rehab.

While Olivia is patient with Olga and understands Olga's needs, Alex is hotheaded and doesn't know how to handle his grandmother's care. Alex tries to maintain his sobriety and secures work at his uncle's slaughterhouse. Olivia and Alex form a bond despite their differences, and one night Olivia fantasizes about Alex after he reads his late grandfather's love letters out loud. She confides to him about her undocumented status and how she would need a green card in order to stay in America, which Alex is sympathetic to. The two enter into a romantic relationship, with Alex unaware of Olivia being trans.

Alex brings home a drunken male friend, Andrei, who snoops around Olivia's room and steals her money while she is in the shower. Here Andrei discovers Olivia's passport which reveals Olivia's pre-transition identity. Andrei shows the passport to Alex, who does not disclose his relationship with Olivia and instead tells Andrei to keep quiet. Alex does not tell Olivia he knows she's trans. When Olivia realizes her belongings were rummaged through, Alex makes up a story that a masked intruder went through her things, increasing Olivia's fear that ICE will do a raid on her. Alex shows up to his job at the slaughterhouse drunk and is fired on the spot by his uncle. Although Alex is initially distant from Olivia, he eventually comforts her after he sees her watching the nonstop news on TV about ongoing immigration raids and deportations. He considers marrying her and looks up marriage license procedures in New York state online. He gets his job back with his uncle after promising to stay sober. While on a overnight trip to Atlantic City, Alex drunkenly offers to marry Olivia the next day and talks about his wishes to have a big family with her. Olivia is hesitant and tells Alex she has something to tell him, but he reassures her that he already knows about her being trans and would still marry her. The next morning in their motel room, Olivia demands that Alex return her passport to her. The ending is left ambiguous; though it is understood Olivia has decided not to go through with the marriage, as she tells her mom in the Philippines she has a new job and has met someone new, with her earnings again going towards financially supporting her family and securing a green card. The film ends with Olga again forgetting her surroundings.

== Cast ==
- Isabel Sandoval as Olivia
- Lynn Cohen as Olga
- Eamon Farren as Alex
- Lev Gorn as Murray
- Ivory Aquino as Trixie
- P.J. Boudousqué as Andrei
- Andrea Leigh as Daria

== Reception ==
The film was received positively. The film has an 86% rating on Rotten Tomatoes, with the consensus: "Lingua Franca brings warmth and humanity to its social issue-driven plot with sensitive performances and writer-director Isabel Sandoval's gently empathetic touch." Stephanie Zacharek wrote for Time that Lingua Franca is "a gorgeous and delicate picture, an understated work that opens a window on an intimate world" and Jude Dry wrote in IndieWire that the film "illustrates the woefully untapped potential of marginalized storytellers". For The Hollywood Reporter, Stephen Dalton wrote Lingua Franca is a "heartfelt personal statement rooted in timely, gripping issues that obviously resonate deeply with its author, notably trans rights and Trump-era immigration anxieties".

Lingua Franca was nominated for the 2021 GLAAD Media Award for Outstanding Film (Limited Release).
