= Splinter (2006 film) =

Film directed by Michael D. Olmos

- Directed by: Michael D. Olmos
- Written by: Michael D. Olmos; Adrian A Cruz; Enrique Almeida
- Produced by: Michael D. Olmos; Adrian A. Cruz; Steven Machat; Enrique Almeida; Mark Hall
- Starring: Tom Sizemore; Edward James Olmos; Enrique Almeida; Resmine Atis
- Cinematography: Bridger Nielson
- Edited by: Jamieson Fry
- Music by: Jae Chong
- Distributed by: Dark Horse Entertainment
- Release date: July 22, 2006
- Running time: 96 Minutes
- Country: United States
- Language: English
- Box office: $12,918

Splinter is a 2006 American police-action film set in Los Angeles directed by Michael D. Olmos and starring Tom Sizemore, Noel Gugliemi and Edward James Olmos.

The film's concept originated with writer and actor Enrique Almeida, who portrays the film's lead character. Noel Gugliemi, who starred as the lead character's brother, stated that the filmmakers wanted to create "a Mexican version of Friday, a Mexican version of Menace II Society." The film grossed $12,918 in United States theaters.

== Plot ==
Dreamer (Enrique Almeida) is being questioned by Detective Gramm (Resmine Atis). We flash back to Dreamer and Shaggy sitting in a car when another car pulls up and does a drive-by shooting. The drive by kills Shaggy and the bullet passes through and into Dreamers head.

A girl is poking through a pile of trash and finds the bodies of the men who performed the drive by. It is revealed that Shaggy of the Greenville gang had been going with Vanessa who was with Trigger (Hector Atreyu Ruiz ) of the opposing gang. Vanessa says that the night of the drive-by that Trigger was hiding something. Another shooting leaves two more dead. Detectives Cunningham (Tom Sizemore) and Gramm question two men whom say that the killings were done by members of Greenville. Vanessa gives Dreamer Triggers gun, Dreamer then calls Gramm to have her meet him in the alley where he gives her three spent bullets and casings from the gun.

Detective Cunningham confronts Captain Garcia (Edward James Olmos) claiming the only reason he was partnered with Gramm was so she could report on his actions. Afterward Garcia starts cleaning out Cunninghams desk and takes his badge after being attacked by Cunningham.

Gramm calls Dreamer to tell him the bullets don't match those that killed Shaggy. After another body is found hacked to death Dreamer goes looking for Trigger accusing him of the murder to cover up the killing of Shaggy. Trigger tells Dreamer that even though he can't remember it he also had a thing with Vanessa and that his number came up before Speedy was killed. Cunningham shows up and shoots Trigger after giving him back his gun.

In a garage Dreamer is remembering more of what happened and thinks it was Dusty that shot Shaggy and confronts him with a gun. Gramm and Cunningham who had been listening come in and Gramm tells Dreamer to put down the gun. Cunningham fires setting off a firefight. After a brief chase and Dreamer shooting Dusty in the leg Dreamer is shot by Cunningham, Dreamer shoots Dusty which causes both Gramm and Cunningham to shoot Dreamer killing him. Gramm realizes it was Cunningham who had shot and killed Shaggy and wounded Dreamer in the drive-by shooting at the beginning of the film.

Cunningham coming out of his bathroom is confronted by a group of men with guns who kill him as Gramm listens to the gunfire from her car before driving off.

== Cast ==
- Enrique Almeida as "Dreamer"
- Resmine Atis as Detective Gramm
- Tom Sizemore as Detective Cunningham
- Noel G. as "Dusty"
- Edward James Olmos as Captain Garcia
- Diamond Dallas Page as Detective Stiles
- Hector Atreyu Ruiz as "Trigger"
