= In the Bosom of the Enemy =

2001 film by Gil Portes

In the Bosom of the Enemy (Tagalog: Gatas: Sa Dibdib ng Kaaway)
- Film poster
- Directed by: Gil Portes
- Screenplay by: Jose Dalisay Jr.; Gil Portes
- Story by: Jose Dalisay Jr.; Gil Portes
- Produced by: Eric M. Cuatico
- Starring: Mylene Dizon; Jomari Yllana
- Cinematography: Ely Cruz
- Edited by: George Jarlego
- Music by: Joy Marfil
- Production company: Crown Seven Ventures
- Distributed by: Millennium Cinema
- Release date: January 4, 2001
- Running time: 101 minutes
- Country: Philippines
- Languages: English; Tagalog; Japanese

In the Bosom of the Enemy (Tagalog: Gatas: Sa Dibdib ng Kaaway) is a 2001 Filipino war drama film directed by Gil Portes. The film stars Mylene Dizon and Jomari Yllana.

== Plot ==
After her husband was arrested from being a Guerilla warrior, Pilar agreed to be a wet nurse to the Japanese General's infant son whose Filipina wife died from giving birth. While attending and taking care of the baby, an unintentional love affair developed between Pilar and the General Hiroshi. She begins to be isolated from her husband and her townspeople as she refused to help the Guerillas to conspire the General's administration following the battle between the Guerillas and the Japanese Soldiers.

== Cast ==
- Mylene Dizon as Pilar
- Jomari Yllana as Diego
- Kenji Motoki as General Hiroshi (Japanese: 陸軍大将浩史, Rikugun-Taishō Hiroshi)
- Mario Magallona as Kojima (Japanese: 児島, Kojima)
- Randy Wong as Uchida (Japanese: 内田, Uchida)
- Nicole Hofer as Carmen
- Ynez Veneracion as Soledad
- Stella Cañete as Munday
- Christian Joseph Leyson as Tetsuya (Japanese: 哲也, Tetsuya)
- Airah Fabioni Ombajin as Ningning
- Richard Quan as Guerilla Leader
- Richard Arellano as Guerilla Aide
- Mon Confiado as Ka Herman
- Neil Ryan Sese as Interpreter

== Academy Award submission for nominee consideration ==
It was the Philippines' submission to the 74th Academy Awards for the 2001 Academy Award for Best Foreign Language Film, but was not accepted as a nominee.

== See also ==
- List of submissions to the 74th Academy Awards for Best Foreign Language Film
