= P. J. Boudousqué =

American actor

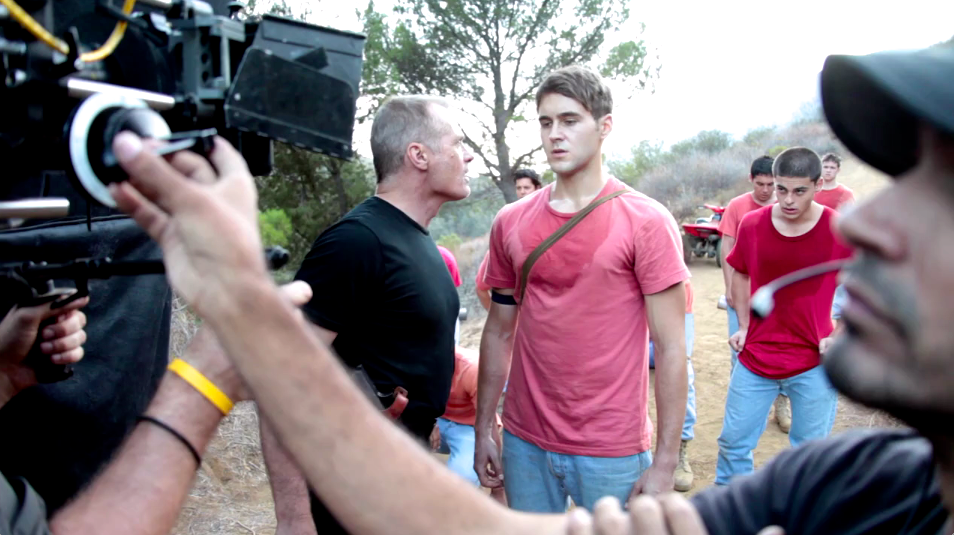
- Coldwater shooting
- Born: Philip John Boudousqué; Louisiana, United States
- Occupation: Actor
- Years active: 2013–present

Philip John "P. J." Boudousqué is an American actor best known for his leading role as Brad Lunders in director Vincent Grashaw's 2013 film Coldwater. Boudousqué was born in Louisiana. He spent his youth in New Orleans, where he performed alternative music before moving to Los Angeles with his family in August 2005 after Hurricane Katrina.

== Career ==
With no prior acting credits, P. J. Boudousqué was cast in the lead role after reading two scenes. After Coldwater, he won roles in American Horror Story (2013), Pretty Little Liars (2013), Bones (2014), and Ascension (2014).

Boudousqué had been auditioning in vain in Hollywood and said he almost gave up on acting just before getting the call for Coldwater, auditioning for the film shortly before moving to New York City. In New York he was planning to study in theater intensives, but after two weeks found out that he had booked the film and had to return to Hollywood.

Boudousqué's performance in Coldwater was universally praised by critics. Don Simpson writing for 'Smells Like Screen Spirit' is typical of the accolades Boudousqué received for his work in the film:

"Boudousqué handles the emotionally dark subject matter with an eerie sense of quietness. As Coldwater showcases the inability of teenagers to communicate their thoughts and feelings, Boudousqué truly embodies this theme. There is a certain something about Boudousqué's performance that reminds me of Ryan Gosling's performance in Drive (and I cannot think of much higher accolades than that!). Without Boudousqué or Gosling ever telling us what is going on in their minds, we know that something is festering deep down inside of them. On the surface, their characters may seem like nice wholesome guys with boyish charms and good looks; we would never guess that they are hiding their violent tendencies, that is until we witness that firsthand."

Almost every reviewer noted the uncanny similarities between Boudousqué and actor Ryan Gosling both in looks and acting style. In France, the company that acquired distribution rights to Coldwater (KMBO) built an entire marketing campaign around Boudousqué's resemblance to the star.
