= Adrian Cruz =

American film director

- Born: Adrian Alejandro Cruz; March 27, 1978 (age 48); United States
- Other name: Alex Cruz
- Occupations: Screenwriter, producer, director
- Years active: 2004–present

Adrian Cruz (born Adrian Alejandro Cruz; March 27, 1978) is an American screenwriter, producer and director. He is best known for creating Ascension TV mini-series and Splinter.

== Biography ==
Cruz attended the USC School of Cinematic Arts, majoring in film and theater, and ever since his graduation has been working as a writer, director and actor. From 2004 to 2006, he was writer for Seed comics series published by Les Humanoïdes Associés. Adrian Cruz is a founding member of The Calamity Theater and a long-time member of The Evidence Room and Bootleg Theater.

== Filmography ==
Adrian Cruz, together with Philip Levens, is creator of Ascension Canadian/American television miniseries. He is also screenwriter and director for Splinter feature movie from 2006. In 2008 Cruz directed Padua Playwrights A Thousand Words play, and in 2011 the Have you seen Alice? play written by Jacqueline Wright.
