= Aparisyon =

- Official poster
- Directed by: Isabel Sandoval (Note: Credited as Vincent Sandoval.)
- Screenplay by: Isabel Sandoval
- Story by: Isabel Sandoval; Jerry Gracio
- Produced by: Jerome Kerkman; Jhun 'McHertz' Macias; Merrick Clint Goho; Markane Earle Goho
- Starring: Jodi Sta. Maria; Mylene Dizon
- Cinematography: Jay Abello
- Edited by: Isabel Sandoval; Jerrold Tarog
- Music by: Teresa Barrozo
- Production companies: Cinemalaya; Autodidact Pictures
- Distributed by: Goldmine Entertainment Productions (Philippines); The Criterion Channel (North American streaming)
- Release dates: July 21, 2012 (Philippine Independent Film Festival); March 20, 2013 (Philippines); April 21, 2021 (North America)
- Running time: 87 minutes
- Country: Philippines
- Language: Filipino

Aparisyon (transl. Apparition) is a 2012 Philippine psychological drama film written and directed by Isabel Sandoval. Set in early 1970s, where the story about the nuns in the period immediately preceding the declaration of martial law by Ferdinand Marcos. It is one of the official entries for the New Breed Full Length Feature Category in Cinemalaya 2012.

Aparisyon was invited to film festivals around the world, including Deauville Asian Film Festival, where it won the Audience Award. At the Hawaii International Film Festival, the film won the NETPAC Award "for its courageous exploration of religious faith, guilt and forgiveness through masterful storytelling and visual imagery". The film was also nominated for the New Currents Award at the 2012 Busan International Film Festival.

As of 2021, along with Señorita, it is available for streaming through the Criterion Channel.

== Synopsis ==
Set in 1971, the sisters of the Adoration monastery in a remote town in Rizal in the Philippines lead quiet and peaceful lives. Remy (Mylene Dizon), an extern nun who is able to leave the monastery from time to time to do errands for the other nuns, learns from her mother that her activist brother is missing. She asks Mother Superior Ruth (Cuyugan-Asensio) for an indefinite leave of absence to help her family search for her brother. When her request is turned down, she starts secretly attending meetings of families with missing relatives. Lourdes (Jodi Sta. Maria) becomes an extern too to go with Remy to attend a meeting. They fell victim to rape on their way back.

== Cast ==
- Jodi Sta. Maria as Sister Lourdes
- Mylene Dizon as Sister Remy
- Fides Cuyugan-Asensio as Mother Superior
- Raquel Villavicencio as Sister Vera
- Maria Monica Reyes as Sister Emilia

== Awards ==
Date	Award	Category	Recipient	Result	Ref(s)
2012	8th Cinemalaya Independent Film Festival	New Breed - Best Film	Isabel Sandoval	Nominated	
2012	8th Cinemalaya Independent Film Festival	Best Sound	Wild Sound	Won	
2012	2012 Busan International Film Festival	New Currents Award	Isabel Sandoval	Nominated	
2012	2012 Deauville Film Festival	Grand Prix	Isabel Sandoval	Nominated	
2012	2012 Deauville Film Festival	Audience Award	Isabel Sandoval	Won	
2012	2012 Hawaii International Film Festival	NETPAC Award	Isabel Sandoval	Won	
2013	Young Critics Circle	Best Performance	Fides Cuyugan-Asensio	Nominated	
2013	Young Critics Circle	Best Editing	Jerrold Tarog and Isabel Sandoval	Nominated	
2013	Young Critics Circle	Best Screenplay	Isabel Sandoval and Jerry Gracio	Nominated	
2013	Gawad Urian Awards 2013	Best Actress	Jodi Sta. Maria	Nominated	
2013	Gawad Urian Awards 2013	Best Supporting Actress	Mylene Dizon	Nominated	
2013	Gawad Urian Awards 2013	Best Supporting Actress	Raquel Villavicencio	Nominated	
