= Mylene Dizon =

Filipino actress and model (born 1976)

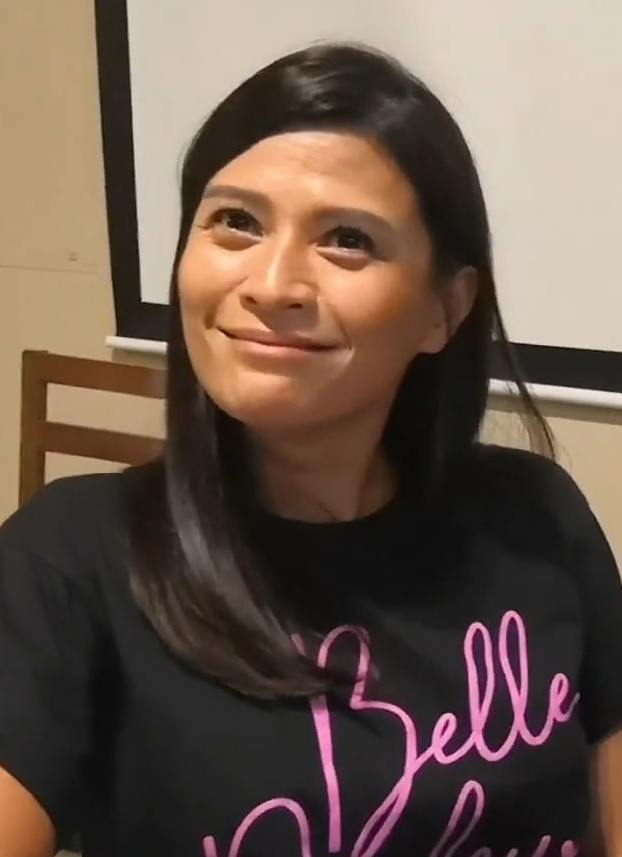
- Dizon in 2019
- Born: Mylene Lilibeth Inocencio Dizon; September 6, 1976 (age 50); Manila, Philippines
- Occupations: Actress, model
- Years active: 1996–present
- Agents: Star Magic; Sparkle
- Partner: Jason Webb (2013–present)
- Children: 2
- Relatives: Allen Dizon (cousin)

Mylene Lilibeth Inocencio Dizon (Tagalog pronunciation: [ˈdɪsɔn]; born September 6, 1976) is a Filipino actress. Known for her versatile work in independent film features and mainstream productions, she has received various accolades, including a Gawad Urian, two Luna Awards, and two Cinemalaya Independent Film Festival Award, in addition to nominations for two FAMAS Awards and a WorldFest-Houston International Film Festival Award.

Dizon made her screen debut in the youth oriented series Gimik (1996). The following year, she portrayed an assaulted woman in the crime drama Calvento Files: The Movie, where she won the Star Awards for New Movie Actress of the Year. She played a supporting role in the teen drama Tabing Ilog (1999) and starred as an abused woman during the Japanese occupation in the war drama Gatas... Sa Dibdib ng Kaaway (2001), for which she received nominations for a FAMAS and Gawad Urian for Best Actress. She received wider audience for her role as Sally, the main antagonist in the romantic drama Sa Dulo ng Walang Hanggan (2001). She received praises for her portrayal of a liberated woman entangled in a forbidden affair in Rome and Juliet (2006), for which she won Best Actress for a Cinema One Originals Digital Film Festival, and nominations for a Gawad Urian and Golden Screen Award for Best Actress.

Dizon also appeared in the romantic family drama Ploning (2008), where she received nominations for a Golden Screen and Gawad Pasado for Best Supporting Actress. Dizon received critical acclaim for her role as an opulent woman diagnosed with cancer in the independent drama 100 (2008), for which she won a Luna and Gawad Urian for Best Actress. She starred in the psychological drama Aparisyon in 2012 and became her fourth Gawad Urian nomination. Dizon's film appearances in the ensuing years including the action thriller 10,000 Hours (2013) and the epic war Heneral Luna (2015) have earned her nominations from major award-giving bodies in the Philippines. In 2019, she received a nomination for Best Actress at the WorldFest-Houston International Film Festival for her role in the Belle Douleur and won her second Luna Award for Best Supporting Actress in the family drama Family Matters (2022).

== Early life and background ==
Mylene Lilibeth Inocencio Dizon was born on September 6, 1974, in Manila, Philippines to Serafin Dizon and Arlene Inocencio. She is the youngest of four children. After graduating from high school, she enrolled in De La Salle University, pursuing a bachelor's degree in communication arts. She stayed in the United States for four months after her family migrated. Dizon eventually went back to the Philippines to pursue a career in the show business. She initially appeared in a number of commercials and soon auditioned in ABS-CBN's talent agency Star Magic.

== Career ==
=== 1996–2005: Early roles and breakthrough ===
Dizon began her acting career after she was launched as one of Star Circle's second batch members by the talent agency Star Magic, along with Diether Ocampo, Patrick Garcia and Marvin Agustin. She made her screen debut in the teen series Gimik (1996) where she starred with an ensemble cast that included Judy Ann Santos, Marvin Agustin, Diether Ocampo, and G. Toengi. Dizon next appeared in two productions in 1997. She had a supporting role in the drama Kulayan Natin ang Bukas and the thriller drama Calvento Files: The Movie. She won the PMPC Star Award for New Movie Actress of the Year for her performance in the latter. The following year, she appeared in two productions. She played a supporting role in the drama Miguel/Michelle and starred in the horror anthology Magandang Hatinggabi. She next appeared in the teen drama Tabing Ilog (1999). That year, she reprised her role in the film adaptation of GIMIK: The Reunion.

In 2001, Dizon starred opposite Jomari Yllana in the war drama Gatas... Sa Dibdib ng Kaaway, which was the Philippine submission for Best Foreign Language Film at the 74th Academy Awards. The film was a critical success, earning her Best Actress nominations for FAMAS and Gawad Urian. Dizon earned wider reception as Sally, the main antagonist in the drama Sa Dulo ng Walang Hanggan. In 2002, she appeared in three productions. First is in the independent film Utang ni Tatang and second is a supporting role in the action adventure Ang Agimat: Anting-Anting ni Lolo. Third is an antagonist role in the comedy superhero Super B starring Rufa Mae Quinto. Dizon's work in the following years has been mainly in television. She played supporting roles in the action romantic Basta't Kasama Kita, the sitcom All Together Now, and her first series under GMA Network, Narito ang Puso Ko. In 2005, she played the role of a social worker in the inspirational drama Mga Anghel na Walang Langit.

=== 2006–2013: Critical success ===
Dizon next starred with Andrea del Rosario in the romantic drama Rome & Juliet (2006). The film tackles issues about forbidden affairs and sexual norms. For her performance, she won Best Actress at the Cinema One Originals Digital Film Festival and received nominations from Gawad Urian and Golden Screen Awards. Also in 2006, she played supporting roles in television dramas Agawin Mo Man ang Lahat, Ang Kasagutan, Mars Ravelo's Captain Barbell and sitcom Bahay Mo Ba 'To?. Dizon played Sofia Santos, the non-biological mother of Charming (played by Eunice Lagusad) in Princess Charming from January 29 to April 27, 2007, as antagonist then she next appeared as one of the villainess in the post-apocalyptic sci-fi Resiklo, an entry to the 2007 Metro Manila Film Festival. The following year, she appeared in the romantic drama Ploning. It earned Dizon Best Supporting Actress nominations from Golden Screen and Gawad Pasado Awards. She next starred with an ensemble cast as an evil werewolf and vampire-like creature in the tenth horror anthology Shake, Rattle & Roll X. It grossed ₱119 million, becoming the highest grossing installment of the film series. Also in 2008, she starred as a woman with cancer in the independent film 100. Dizon received widespread acclaim for her performance, winning her first Best Actress trophies at the Luna, Cinemalaya Independent Film Festival and Gawad Urian, including nominations for a FAMAS and Star Awards for Movies. Dizon next portrayed Dyangga, the wicked queen of mermaids and main antagonist in the fantasy drama Dyesebel (2008).

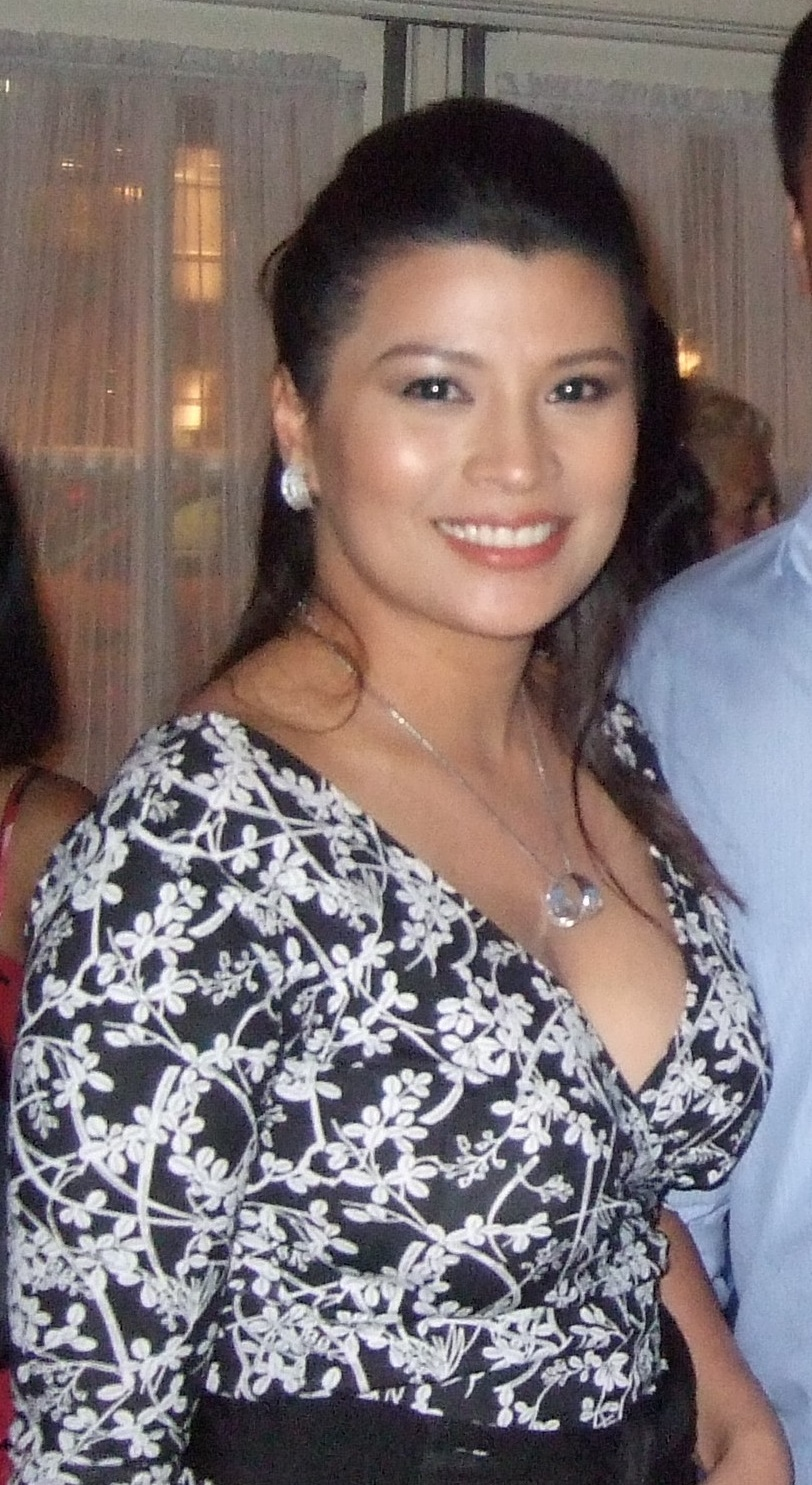
Dizon in 2009

The following year, she made a guest appearance in the drama May Bukas Pa and was cast in a supporting role in Tayong Dalawa. Also in 2009, she was cast in the romantic comedy Status: Single. In 2010, she was handpicked by director Jose Javier Reyes in the sequel Working Girls. The same year, Dizon was tapped to play the role of Susan David (originally by Susan Africa as Susan Davis) in the remake Mara Clara. She was next cast in the series Budoy (2011) and made a special participation in Kahit Puso'y Masugatan (2012). Dizon also appeared in two film productions in 2012. She starred alongside Jodi Sta. Maria in the psychological drama Aparisyon. For her portrayal, she received her fourth Gawad Urian nomination for Best Supporting Actress. She next portrayed the role of a social climber in the comedy Sosy Problems. Her performance earned her nominations for a Star Award and Golden Screen Awards. In 2013, she made special participation in the fantasy drama Juan dela Cruz and its prequel My Little Juan, including supporting roles in Kahit Konting Pagtingin and Huwag Ka Lang Mawawala. The same year, she also starred in the drama Bamboo Flowers and played secondary roles in mainstream productions Bakit Hindi Ka Crush Ng Crush Mo? and 10,000 Hours. The latter earned her a Best Supporting Actress nomination at the Metro Manila Film Festival.

=== 2014–present: Established actress ===
Dizon next starred in the independent drama Mariquina (2014), followed by the comedy Moron 5.2: The Transformation and played the role of a socialite in Red. She was also cast in the fantasy drama Mirabella and joined the second season of Ikaw Lamang. In 2015, Dizon appeared in three productions, two of which are epic wars Heneral Luna, where she received Best Supporting Actress nominations from Gawad Urian, Luna and Star Awards for Movies, and Felix Manalo. Also in 2015, she was cast in the melodrama Doble Kara. After a one-year absence from the screen, Dizon appeared in the crime drama The Good Son. She received a nomination for Best Drama Supporting Actress at the 32nd Star Awards for Television. In 2019, Dizon appeared in the third installment of the Ang Babae sa Septic Tank 3: The Real Untold Story of Josephine Bracken. She also starred with an ensemble cast in the comedy Call Me Tita and the fantasy drama Sahaya, where Dizon played the character of a Badjao mother. She made her screen comeback in the romantic drama Belle Douleur opposite Kit Thompson, an official entry at the Cinemalaya Independent Film Festival. She received a Best Actress nomination at the WorldFest-Houston International Film Festival for her performance. She next appeared in two mainstream productions.

Dizon starred with Carmina Villaroel in the horror Sunod and made a cameo appearance in the fantasy adventure Magikland, which were official entries at the Metro Manila Film Festival in 2019 and 2020 respectively. In 2020, Dizon starred alongside Nora Aunor and Kyline Alcantara in the drama Bilangin ang Bituin sa Langit. She continuously appeared in television productions in the next two years, playing secondary roles in Huwag Kang Mangamba (2021) as a feisty journalist, a strict parent in My Sunset Girl (2021) and as the main antagonist in Love in 40 Days (2022). In 2022, Dizon was cast in the family drama Family Matters which was an official entry at the Metro Manila Film Festival and became one of the top grossing entries at the festival of that year. For her performance, she won her second Luna Award for Best Supporting Actress and earned a FAMAS nomination in the same category. In the year that followed, Dizon was cast in the limited series Fractured and was cast in the Metro Manila Film Festival entry, Mallari. In January 2024, she was announced as one of the ensemble cast in the family drama Pamilya Sagrado.

== Reception and acting style ==
Dizon is often regarded as one of the finest Filipino actresses of her generation. Having appeared in numerous independent films and mainstream productions of varying genres since her career's inception in mid-1990s, she is noted for displaying depth and emotional connection to the characters she portrays. Edwin Sallan of Philippine Entertainment Portal described her portrayal in Belle Douleur (2019) as the best performance of her career, saying: "Mylene has mastered the art of nuanced acting that indie films are known for... [Her] subtle approach reminiscent of Hollywood actress Diane Lane (and equally as luminous) was effective in previous Cinemalaya entries such as Aparisyon (2012) and Mariquina (2014)." Writing for The Philippine Star, Tim Yap praised Dizon's ability to tackle any role she is given with strength, saying: "Even if her assigned characters are on the surface, weak, she gives it multiple dimensions." Variety praised Dizon's performances in 100 (2008) and Heneral Luna (2015). Chris Martinez, director of the film 100, stated that Dizon was the first and only choice for the role, saying: "She exudes strength and invulnerability even at the "default" stage. I wanted that presence, that beauty, and the willingness to stretch her limits and talents. She was a gung-ho actress. Very intelligent, very instinctive, and yes, very, very beautiful!"

In 2019, the Film Development Council of the Philippines have cited Dizon as one of the luminaries in Philippine cinema through the Sine Sandaan event. Dolly Anne Carvajal of Inquirer Entertainment named her one of the best Filipino actresses. Butch Francisco of The Philippine Star included Gatas... Sa Dibdib ng Kaaway on their list of the best Philippine films of 2001. Media publications such as Spot.ph and the Philippine Daily Inquirer have also included her on their list of notable Filipino villains, particularly for her portrayal as Sally Concepcion in the series Sa Dulo ng Walang Hanggan (2001). Three films she appeared in, such as Gatas... Sa Dibdib ng Kaaway (2001), Ploning (2008) and Heneral Luna (2015), were Philippine entries for Best Foreign Language Film at the Academy Awards. Dizon has appeared in Yes! magazine's annual beauty list in 2007 and 2012. In a 2013 interview at the DZMM Teleradyo in the Pasada Sais Trenta program, John Lloyd Cruz expressed admiration towards Dizon.

== Other ventures ==
In 2002, Dizon made her stage debut in the musical Rocky Horror Show, staged in RCBC Plaza Carlos P. Romulo Auditorium. In late November 2021, Dizon participated in the launch of Mga Munting Babae, the Filipino translated version of Little Women by Louisa May Alcott, at the Performatura: Performance Literature Festival.

== Personal life ==
Dizon has two sons with ex-boyfriend Paolo Paraiso, Tomas, born in 2005 and Lucas, who was born in 2009. Jason Webb has been in a relationship with Dizon since 2013.

== Acting credits ==
=== Film ===
Key
†	Denotes films that have not yet been released

Mylene Dizon's film credits with year of release, film titles and roles
Year	Title	Role	Notes	Ref
1997	Kulayan Natin ang Bukas	Maricris		
1997	Calvento Files: The Movie	Mia		
1998	Miguel/Michelle	Sonia		
1998	Magandang Hatinggabi	Abby		
1999	Gimik: The Reunion	Melanie Suntay		
2001	Gatas... Sa Dibdib ng Kaaway	Pilar		
2002	Utang ni Tatang			
2002	Super B	Daisy		
2002	Ang Agimat: Anting-anting ni Lolo	Aling Virgie / Manananggal		
2006	Rome & Juliet	Rome Miranda		
2007	Resiklo	Alura		
2008	Ploning	Celeste		
2008	Shake, Rattle & Roll X	Aswang Wife	Segment: "Emergency"	
2008	100	Joyce De Leon		
2009	Status: Single	Vicky		
2010	Working Girls	Connie Valderama		
2010	Super Inday and the Golden Bibe	Ingrid		
2012	Aparisyon	Sister Remy		
2012	Sosy Problems	Bernice		
2013	Bakit Hindi Ka Crush Ng Crush Mo?	Pamela		
2013	Bamboo Flowers	Sandra		
2013	10,000 Hours	Anna		
2013	Kimmy Dora: Ang Kiyemeng Prequel	Cameo		
2014	Mariquina	Imelda Nunez		
2014	Moron 5.2: The Transformation	Sally		
2014	Red			
2015	Heneral Luna	Isabel		
2015	Felix Manalo	Bonifacia "Facia" Manalo		
2015	No Boyfriend Since Birth	Mimi		
2019	Belle Douleur	Liz		
2019	Sunod	Karen		
2020	Magikland	Usasa	Cameo appearance	
2022	Family Matters	Fortune		
2023	Mallari	Melinda	Cameo appearance	
2024	The Hearing			
2024	Uninvited	Katrina Vega		
2025	Ex Ex Lovers	Mimi		
2025	Kontrabida Academy	Science Teacher		
2025	Habang Nilalamon ng Hydra ang Kasaysayan	Mela		
2025	Untold	Sylvia		
2027	The Last Resort †			

=== Television ===
Key
†	Denotes shows that have not yet been aired

Mylene Dizon's television credits with year of release, show titles and roles
Year	Title	Role	Notes	Ref(s)
1995–2004	ASAP	Herself (Co-Host/Performer)		
1996–1999	Gimik	Melanie Suntay		
1997	Maalaala Mo Kaya: Tatoo	Abby		
1998	Maalaala Mo Kaya: Kanto Girl	Donna		
1999	Tabing Ilog	Jennifer "Jerry" Ricafort		
1999	Saan Ka Man Naroroon	Karen		
1999	Maalaala Mo Kaya: Piano	Maricar		
2000	Maalaala Mo Kaya: Maskara	Donna		
2001	Sa Dulo ng Walang Hanggan	Susan Concepcion / Sarah Concepcion / Sally Perida / Sally Benipayo / Sally Concepcion / Samantha Diaz / Sister Salvacion / Solita Castro		
2003	Basta't Kasama Kita	Joyce		
2003	Narito ang Puso Ko	Estella "Stella" Bautista		
2005	Mga Anghel na Walang Langit	Ira Mercado		
2006	Agawin Mo Man ang Lahat	Greta Valverde		
2006	Ang Kasagutan	Lena		
2006	Bahay Mo Ba 'To?	Leona		
2006	Mars Ravelo's Captain Barbell	Magna / Magnetica		
2007	Princess Charming	Sofia Santos		
2007	Kokey	Myra Villoria-Alegre		
2008	Sineserye Presents: Maligno	Liz Pascual		
2008	Mars Ravelo's Dyesebel	Reyna Dyangga		
2009	Tayong Dalawa	Loretta Dominguez-King		
2009	May Bukas Pa	Jacky "Jackie" Santos		
2010	Magkano ang Iyong Dangal?	Rita Robles		
2010	Tanging Yaman	Atty. Leona Policarpio-Jacinto		
2010	Your Song Presents: Gimik 2010	Melanie Suntay-Lorenzo		
2010	Lady Dada	Rina		
2010	Emil Cruz, Jr.'s Mara Clara	Susan David		
2011	Budoy	Dra. Grace Maniego		
2012	Kahit Puso'y Masugatan	Fatima San Jose		
2012	Maalaala Mo Kaya: Tinapay	Flor	Episode: "Tinapay"	
2012	Wansapanataym: Hear Na U, Sori Na Me	Verna	Episode: "Hear Na U, Sori Na Me"	
2013	Kahit Konting Pagtingin	Narissa Ledesma-Dimagiba		
2013	Juan dela Cruz	Amelia dela Cruz		
2013	Wansapanataym	Divina	Episode: "Bokbok, Ang Batang Magpanubok"	
2013	My Little Juan	Amelia dela Cruz		
2013	Huwag Ka Lang Mawawala	Athena Apostol		
2013	Wansapanataym	Mila	Episode: "The Christmas Tablet"	
2014	Mirabella	Olivia "Olive" Flores-Robles		
2014	Wansapanataym	Carol Jimenez	Episode: "My Guardian Angel"	
2014	Ikaw Lamang	Tessa Villanueva		
2014	Ipaglaban Mo!	Lita Mauricio	Episode: "Pagkilala ng Ama"	
2014	Magpakailanman	Nene	Episode: "Henyo Ng Bangketa"	
2014	Magpakailanman	Juvilyn	Episode: "Love After The Storm"	
2015	Once Upon a Kiss	Giselle Pelaez-Almario		
2015	Karelasyon	Minda		
2015	Nathaniel	Judith		
2015	Doble Kara	Laura Hipolito-Suarez		
2017	The Good Son	Racquel Reyes-Moreno		
2019	Ang Babae sa Septic Tank 3: The Real Untold Story of Josephine Bracken	Saturnina Rizal		
2019	Call Me Tita	Frida Wilson		
2019	Sahaya	Manisan Arati		
2019	Pepito Manaloto: Ang Tunay na Kuwento	Geraldine Lopez		
2020	Bilangin ang Bituin sa Langit	Magnolia "Nolie" Dela Cruz-Santos		
2021	Huwag Kang Mangamba	Eva Marquez		
2021	My Sunset Girl	Melissa		
2022	Love in 40 Days	Andrea C. Buena-Montemayor / Ma. Cristina Ocampo		
2022	Tadhana	Amy	Episode: ''Baliw na Puso''	
2022	Magpakailanman	Daisy	Episode: ''A Christmas Miracle''	
2023	Fractured	Carol		
2024	Pamilya Sagrado	Mercedes Ramos-Sagrado		
2024	How to Spot a Red Flag	Vivian Fontanilla		
2026	The Silent Noise †	Samantha Ignacio		
2026	The Good Doctor †			

== Accolades ==
Awards and nominations received by Mylene Dizon
Award (Note: Awards, festivals, honors and other miscellaneous organizations are listed in alphabetical order.)	Year (Note: Indicates the year of ceremony. Each year is linked to the article about the awards held that year, wherever possible.)	Category	Recipient(s)	Result	Ref.
Cinemalaya Independent Film Festival	2008	Best Actress	100	Won	
Cinemalaya Independent Film Festival	2025	Best Actress	Habang Nilalamon ng Hydra ang Kasaysayan	Won	
Cinema One Originals Digital Film Festival	2006	Best Actress	Rome and Juliet	Won	
FAMAS Awards	2002	Best Actress	Gatas... Sa Dibdib ng Kaaway	Nominated	
FAMAS Awards	2023	Best Supporting Actress	Family Matters	Nominated	
FAMAS Awards	2025	Best Supporting Actress	The Hearing	Nominated	
Gawad Pasado	2009	Best Supporting Actress	Ploning	Nominated	
Gawad Pasado	2023	Best Supporting Actress	Family Matters	Nominated	
Gawad Urian	2002	Best Actress	Gatas... Sa Dibdib ng Kaaway	Nominated	
Gawad Urian	2007	Best Actress	Rome and Juliet	Nominated	
Gawad Urian	2009	Best Actress	100	Won	
Gawad Urian	2013	Best Supporting Actress	Aparisyon	Nominated	
Gawad Urian	2016	Best Supporting Actress	Heneral Luna	Nominated	
Gawad Urian	2025	Best Actress	The Hearing	Pending	
Gawad Tanglaw	2010	Best Ensemble Performance in a Television Drama	Tayong Dalawa	Won	
Golden Screen Awards	2007	Best Performance by an Actress in a Leading Role (Drama)	Rome and Juliet	Nominated	
Golden Screen Awards	2009	Best Performance by an Actress in a Leading Role (Drama)	100	Won	
Golden Screen Awards	2009	Best Performance by an Actress in a Supporting Role (Drama, Musical or Comedy)	Ploning	Nominated	
Golden Screen Awards	2011	Outstanding Supporting Actress in a Drama Series	Mara Clara	Nominated	
Golden Screen Awards	2013	Best Performance by an Actress in a Supporting Role (Drama, Musical or Comedy)	Sosy Problems	Nominated	
Luna Awards	2009	Best Actress	100	Won	
Luna Awards	2016	Best Supporting Actress	Heneral Luna	Nominated	
Luna Awards	2023	Best Supporting Actress	Family Matters	Won	
Metro Manila Film Festival	2013	Best Supporting Actress	10,000 Hours	Nominated	
Society of Filipino Film Reviewers	2023	Best Ensemble Performance	Family Matters	Won	
Star Awards for Movies	1998	New Movie Actress of the Year	Calvento Files: The Movie	Won	
Star Awards for Movies	2009	Movie Actress of the Year	100	Nominated	
Star Awards for Movies	2013	Movie Supporting Actress of the Year	Sosy Problems	Nominated	
Star Awards for Movies	2016	Movie Supporting Actress of the Year	Heneral Luna	Nominated	
Star Awards for Television	2018	Best Drama Supporting Actress	The Good Son	Nominated	
The EDDYS	2023	Best Supporting Actress	Family Matters	Nominated	
WorldFest-Houston International Film Festival	2021	Best Actress	Belle Douleur	Nominated	

== See also ==
- Cinema of the Philippines
- List of Filipino actresses
- Television in the Philippines
