= Robert Merritt Awards =

Awards administered by Theatre Nova Scotia

The Robert Merritt Awards, commonly known as The Merritt Awards, were started in 2002 and are administered by Theatre Nova Scotia. The Merritts honour excellence in theatre throughout the province of Nova Scotia. They are named for Robert Merritt, who was well known to the Halifax community both as a teacher of playwriting in the Theatre Department at Dalhousie University, and as the film critic for CBC's Information Morning.

Awards are given for Acting, Direction, Lighting, Set Design, Costume Design, Sound Design, Music, and Outstanding New Play by a Nova Scotian Playwright. Special awards are given for Technician, Stage Manager, Volunteerism, and Career Legacy.

== List of Robert Merritt Award nominees and winners by year ==
=== 2020 ===
See references

| Outstanding Performance in a Leading Role | Production | Company |
|---|---|---|
| Jacob Sampson* | The Bridge | 2b theatre and Neptune Theatre in association with Obsidian Theatre |
| Ronica Sajnani | A Brimful of Asha | Festival Antigonish Summer Theatre |
| Mauralea Austin | The Children | Keep Good (Theatre) Company |
| Martha Irving | The Children | Keep Good (Theatre) Company |
| Tara Jackson* | The Colour Purple | Neptune Theatre |
| Burgandy Code | Hamlet | Below the Salt |
| Jackie Torrens | Hamlet | Below the Salt |
| Burgandy Code | In This Light | Two Planks and a Passion Theatre |
| Taylor Olson | Monster | That's Us Collective |
| Kelly Holiff | Peter Pan | Neptune Theatre |
| Outstanding Performance in a Supporting Role | Production | Company |
| Jim Codrington | The Bridge | 2b theatre and Neptune Theatre in association with Obsidian Theatre |
| Daniel Ellis | The Bridge | 2b theatre and Neptune Theatre in association with Obsidian Theatre |
| Sophia Walker | The Bridge | 2b theatre and Neptune Theatre in association with Obsidian Theatre |
| Karen Burthwright* | The Colour Purple | Neptune Theatre |
| Janelle Cooper* | The Colour Purple | Neptune Theatre |
| Samantha Walkes | The Colour Purple | Neptune Theatre |
| Breton Lalama | Pleasureville | Neptune Theatre |
| Sherry Smith | Pleasureville | Neptune Theatre |
| Gil Anderson | The Realistic Joneses | KAZAN CO-OP |
| Matthew Lumley | The Realistic Joneses | KAZAN CO-OP |
| Outstanding Choreography | Production | Company |
| Veronique Mackenzie | Ben Hur | Festival Antigonish Summer Festival |
| Veronique Mackenzie | The Children | Keep Good (Theatre) Company |
| Tracy Fanous* | Miss ‘N Me | Eastern Front Theatre |
| Stephanie Graham | Peter Pan | Neptune Theatre |
| Sarain Fox | Rings Through Water | Xara Choral Theatre |
| Outstanding Direction | Production | Company |
| Pamela Halstead | Bed and Breakfast | Ship's Company Theatre |
| Anthony Black | The Bridge | 2b theatre and Neptune Theatre in association with Obsidian Theatre |
| Laura Vingoe-Cram | The Children | Keep Good (Theatre) Company |
| Kimberley Rampersad* | The Colour Purple | Neptune Theatre |
| Heidi Malazdrewich | He'd Be Your Mother's Father's Cousin | Theatre Baddeck |
| Outstanding Scenic Design | Production | Company |
| Rachel Forbes* | The Bridge | 2b theatre and Neptune Theatre in association with Obsidian Theatre |
| Stephen Osler (assisted by Patricia Vinluan) | The Children | Keep Good (Theatre) Company |
| Tamara Marie Kucheran | The Colour Purple | Neptune Theatre |
| John Dinning | Noises Off | Neptune Theatre |
| Jess Lewis and Anna Shepard (video) | tiny | Zuppa Theatre, presented by Eastern Front Theatre |
| Outstanding Lighting Design | Production | Company |
| Leigh Ann Vardy* | The Bridge | 2b theatre and Neptune Theatre in association with Obsidian Theatre |
| Vicky Williams | The Children | Keep Good (Theatre) Company |
| Leigh Ann Vardy | The Colour Purple | Neptune Theatre |
| Ingrid Risk | The Last Wife | Neptune Theatre |
| Vicky Williams | Peter Pan | Neptune Theatre |
| Outstanding Costume Design | Production | Company |
| Rachel Forbes | The Bridge | 2b theatre and Neptune Theatre in association with Obsidian Theatre |
| Tamara Marie Kucheran* | The Colour Purple | Neptune Theatre |
| Kaelen MacDonald | Fox | The Villain's Theatre |
| Janet MacLellan | The Last Wife | Neptune Theatre |
| Emlyn Murray | Miss ‘N Me | Eastern Front Theatre |
| Outstanding Sound Design | Production | Company |
| Aaron Collier | Bed and Breakfast | Ship's Company Theatre |
| Tori Morrison | The Children | Keep Good (Theatre) Company |
| Miquelon Rodriguez | The Colour Purple | Neptune Theatre |
| Aaron Collier | Lo (or Dear Mr. Wells) | Neptune Theatre |
| Aaron Collier | Miss ‘N Me | Eastern Front Theatre |
| Outstanding Original Score | Production | Company |
| Aaron Collier | Bed and Breakfast | Ship's Company Theatre |
| Carolyn Curry | Firebird: The Musical | Terra Novella Theatre |
| Allen Cole and Ken Schwartz* | Frankenstein by Fire | Eastern Front Theatre & Neptune Theatre |
| Keke Beatz | Miss ‘N Me | Eastern Front Theatre |
| Jenny Trites and Deantha Edmunds | Rings Through Water | Xara Choral Theatre |
| Outstanding Musical Direction | Production | Company |
| Murleta Williams | The Bridge | 2b theatre and Neptune Theatre in association with Obsidian Theatre |
| Eszter Horvath | Brundibár | Halifax Theatre for Young People |
| Sean Mayes* | The Color Purple | Neptune Theatre |
| Lisa St. Clair | Peter Pan | Neptune Theatre |
| Christina Murray | Rings Through Water | Xara Choral Theatre |
| Outstanding Play by a Nova Scotian Playwright | Production | Company |
| Shauntay Grant* | The Bridge | 2b theatre and Neptune Theatre in association with Obsidian Theatre |
| Catherine Banks (based on Enemy of the People by Henrik Ibsen) | In This Light | Eastern Front Theatre & Neptune Theatre |
| Daniel MacIvor | An Ordinary Afternoon in 1974 | Mulgrave Road Theatre |
| Gillian Clark | The Ruins | Two Planks and a Passion Theatre |
| Dan Bray | Zomblet | Villains Theatre and Terra Novella Theatre |
| Outstanding Production by a New or Emerging Company | Company | |
| Bunny | Highland Arts Theatre | |
| The Children* | Keep Good (Theatre) Company | |
| Every Brilliant Thing | Kick at the Dark Theatre Co-Operative | |
| He'd Be Your Mother's Father's Cousin | Theatre Baddeck | |
| Rings Through Water | Xara Choral Theatre | |
| Award for Outstanding Production | Company | |
| The Bridge | 2b theatre and Neptune Theatre in association with Obsidian Theatre | |
| A Brimful of Asha | Festival Antigonish Summer Theatre | |
| The Children | Keep Good (Theatre) Company | |
| The Color Purple* | Neptune Theatre | |
| In This Light | Eastern Front Theatre & Neptune Theatre | |

2020 Outstanding Theatre Technician: Thomas Brookes, The Last Wife, Neptune Theatre

2020 Outstanding Stage Manager: Robin Munro, Frankenstein by Fire, Two Planks and a Passion Theatre

2020 Outstanding Volunteer: Alex Mills

2020 Theatre Nova Scotia Legacy Award: Joan Craig

2020 Theatre Nova Scotia Scholarship: Logan Robins and Ursula Calder

2020 Wes Daniels Design Award: Wesley Babcock with Matchstick Theatre

2020 Neptune Theatre Chrysalis Emerging Artist Award: Anna Shepard

=== 2019 ===
See references

| Outstanding Actor | Production | Company |
|---|---|---|
| Wally MacKinnon | Any Given Moment | Ship's Company Theatre |
| Josh Doig | Kamp | Eastern Front Theatre & Neptune Theatre |
| Lee J Campbell* | Shylock | No Holds Bard |
| Hugh Thompson | Some Blow Flutes | HomeFirst Productions |
| Stewart Legere | Tom at the Farm | WorkShirt Opera |
| Outstanding Actress | Production | Company |
| Burgandy Code | Animal Farm | Two Planks and a Passion Theatre |
| Samantha Walkes | Cinderella | Neptune Theatre |
| Mauralea Austin* | Dancing on the Elephant | Theatre Baddeck |
| Sharleen Kalayil | Half-Cracked: The Legend of Sugar Mary | Eastern Front Theatre & Neptune Theatre |
| Francine Deschepper | Some Blow Flutes | HomeFirst Theatre |
| Outstanding Supporting Actor | Production | Company |
| Jeff Schwager | Animal Farm | Two Planks and a Passion Theatre |
| Ryan Rogerson | Animal Farm | Two Planks and a Passion Theatre |
| Andrew Prashad* | Cinderella | Neptune Theatre |
| Tim Funnell | Mamma Mia! | Neptune Theatre |
| Sebastien Labelle | Tom at the Farm | WorkShirt Opera |
| Outstanding Supporting Actress | Production | Company |
| Kathryn McCormack | Alice in Wonderland | Shakespeare by the Sea |
| Genevieve Steele | Animal Farm | Two Planks and a Passions Theatre |
| Burgandy Code* | North Mountain Vanya | Two Planks and a Passions Theatre |
| Kathrine Tufts | Othello | Shakespeare by the Sea |
| Susan Stackhouse | Shakespeare in Love | Neptune Theatre |
| Outstanding Choreography | Production | Company |
| Jade Douris | Alice in Wonderland | Shakespeare by the Sea |
| Stephanie Graham | Cinderella | Neptune Theatre |
| Veronique Mackenzie* | Kamp | Eastern Front Theatre & Neptune Theatre |
| Ray Hogg | Mamma Mia! | Neptune Theatre |
| Mary Lou Martin (movement) & Karen Bassett (fight) | Shakespeare in Love | Neptune Theatre |
| Outstanding Direction | Production | Company |
| Ken Schwartz* | Animal Farm | Two Planks and a Passions Theatre |
| Martha Irving | Half-Cracked: The Legend of Sugar Mary | Eastern Front Theatre & Neptune Theatre |
| Sam Rosenthal | Kamp | Eastern Front Theatre & Neptune Theatre |
| Ann-Marie Kerr & Anthony Black, assisted by Anna Shepard | One Discordant Violin | 2b Theatre Company |
| Heidi Malazdrewich | The Ladies Foursome | Theatre Baddeck |
| Outstanding Scenic Design | Production | Company |
| Holly Carr* | Half-Cracked: The Legend of Sugar Mary | Eastern Front Theatre & Neptune Theatre |
| Sean Mulcahy | Kamp | Eastern Front Theatre & Neptune Theatre |
| Joanna Yu | Shakespeare in Love | Neptune Theatre |
| Sue LePage | Some Blow Flutes | HomeFirst Theatre |
| Wes Babcock | The Woodcutter | Matchstick Theatre |
| Outstanding Lighting Design | Production | Company |
| Ingrid Risk | Half-Cracked: The Legend of Sugar Mary | Eastern Front Theatre & Neptune Theatre |
| Leigh Ann Vardy* | Kamp | Eastern Front Theatre & Neptune Theatre |
| Leigh Ann Vardy | Mamma Mia! | Neptune Theatre |
| Nick Bottomley & Anna Shepard | One Discordant Violin | 2b Theatre Company |
| Jessica Lewis | Shakespeare in Love | Neptune Theatre |
| Outstanding Costume Design | Production | Company |
| Emlyn Murray | Big Sister Little Brother | Festival Antigonish Summer Theatre |
| Helena Marriott* | Cinderella | Neptune Theatre |
| Bonnie Deakin | Mamma Mia! | Neptune Theatre |
| Jennifer Goodman | North Mountain Vanya | Two Planks and a Passions Theatre |
| Joanna Yu | Shakespeare in Love | Ship's Company Theatre |
| Outstanding Sound Design | Production | Company |
| Deanna Choi | Cinderella | Neptune Theatre |
| June Zinck* | Half-Cracked: The Legend of Sugar Mary | Eastern Front Theatre & Neptune Theatre |
| Michael Doherty | Kamp | Eastern Front Theatre & Neptune Theatre |
| Emily C Porter | Mamma Mia! | Neptune Theatre |
| Aaron Collier | One Discordant Violin | 2b Theatre Company |
| Outstanding Original Score | Production | Company |
| Jeremy Hutton | Alice in Wonderland | Shakespeare by the Sea |
| Allen Cole & Ken Schwartz | Animal Farm | Two Planks and a Passions Theatre |
| GaRRy Williams* | Kamp | Eastern Front Theatre & Neptune Theatre |
| Aaron Collier & Jacques Mindreau | One Discordant Violin | 2b Theatre Company |
| GaRRy Williams | Twelfth Night | Shakespeare by the Sea |
| Outstanding Musical Direction | Production | Company |
| Allen Cole | Animal Farm | Two Planks and a Passions Theatre |
| Lisa St. Clair | Cinderella | Neptune Theatre |
| Tara Scott* | Kamp | Eastern Front Theatre & Neptune Theatre |
| Paul De Gurse | Mamma Mia! | Neptune Theatre |
| Aaron Collier & Jacques Mindreau | One Discordant Violin | 2b theatre company |
| Outstanding Play by a Nova Scotian Playwright | Production | Company |
| Allen Cole & Ken Schwartz* (adapted from the novel by George Orwell) | Animal Farm | Two Planks and a Passions Theatre |
| Mary Colin Chisholm | Half-Cracked: The Legend of Sugar Mary | Eastern Front Theatre & Neptune Theatre |
| Book by Jamie Bradley, Music & lyrics by GaRRy Williams | Kamp | Eastern Front Theatre & Neptune Theatre |
| Anthony Black (adapted from a short story by Yann Martel) | One Discordant Violin | 2b Theatre |
| Mary Vingoe | Some Blow Flutes | HomeFirst Theatre |
| Outstanding Production by a New or Emerging Company | Company | |
| Shylock | No Holds Bard | |
| The Ladies Foursome* | Theatre Baddeck | |
| The Woodcutter | Matchstick Theatre | |
| Tom at the Farm | Workshirt Opera | |
| Award for Outstanding Production | Company | |
| Animal Farm | Two Planks and a Passion Theatre | |
| Cinderella | Neptune Theatre | |
| Half-Cracked: The Legend of Sugar Mary | Eastern Front Theatre & Neptune Theatre | |
| Kamp* | Eastern Front Theatre & Neptune Theatre | |
| One Discordant Violin | 2b Theatre | |

2019 Outstanding Theatre Technician: Andrew Cull

2019 Outstanding Stage Manager: Jessica Lewis

2019 Outstanding Volunteer: Alex Mills

2019 Theatre Nova Scotia Legacy Award: Susan Stackhouse

2019 Theatre Nova Scotia Scholarship: Anna Shepard

2019 Wes Daniels Design Award: Festival Antigonish Summer Theatre with Elizabeth Perry

2019 Neptune Theatre Chrysalis Emerging Artist Award: Chelsea Dickie

2019 Outstanding Presentation: Mouthpiece (presented by 2b theatre company)

=== 2018 ===
See references

| Outstanding Actor | Production | Company |
|---|---|---|
| Hugh Thompson | Kingfisher Days | Festival Antigonish Summer Theatre |
| Marty Burt* | Next to Normal | Highland Arts Theatre |
| Ben Caplan | Old Stock: A Refugee Love Story | 2b Theatre Company |
| Aaron Collier | Princess Rules | Heist |
| Christian Murray | The Hound of the Baskervilles | Festival Antigonish Summer Theatre |
| Outstanding Actress | Production | Company |
| Burgandy Code | Dream by Fire | Two Planks and a Passion Theatre |
| Lucy Hill | I, Claudia | Felix Productions |
| Francine Deschepper | Kingfisher Days | Festival Antigonish Summer Theatre |
| Mary Fay Coady* | Old Stock: A Refugee Love Story | 2b Theatre Company |
| Genevieve Steele | Snake in the Grass | Neptune Theatre |
| Outstanding Supporting Actor | Production | Company |
| Devin Mackinnon | Dream by Fire | Two Planks and a Passion Theatre |
| Graham Percy | Nothing Less! | Two Planks and a Passion Theatre |
| Ryan Rogerson | Nothing Less! | Two Planks and a Passion Theatre |
| Richie Wilcox* | Princess Rules | Heist |
| Don Allison | The Mystery Play | Ship's Company Theatre |
| Outstanding Supporting Actress | Production | Company |
| Lesley Smith | At This Hour | Zuppa Theatre |
| Mary Fay Coady | At This Hour | Zuppa Theatre |
| Stephanie MacDonald* | Dream by Fire | Two Planks and a Passion Theatre |
| Lara Lewis | Princess Rules | Heist |
| Karen Bassett | Pugwash | Ship's Company Theatre |
| Outstanding Choreography | Production | Company |
| (Puppetry) Jim Morrow and Andrea Lee Norwood | Dream by Fire | Two Planks and a Passion Theatre |
| Laura Caswell | Nothing Less! | Two Planks and a Passion Theatre |
| Jacinte Armstrong* | Princess Rules | Heist |
| Celia Koughan | Stan Rogers: A Matter of Heart | Geordie Brown Productions, presented by Neptune Theatre |
| Ron Jenkins | The 25th Annual Putnam County Spelling Bee | Highland Arts Theatre |
| Outstanding Direction | Production | Company |
| Ken Schwartz | Dream by Fire | Two Planks and a Passions Theatre |
| Ann-Marie Kerr, with assistant direction by Gillian Clark | I, Claudia | Felix Productions |
| Ron Jenkins | Next to Normal | Highland Arts Theatre |
| Christian Barry* | Old Stock: A Refugee Love Story | 2b Theatre Company |
| Jean-Pierre Cloutier | Princess Rules | Heist |
| Outstanding Scenic Design | Production | Company |
| Andrew Cull | I, Claudia | Felix Productions |
| Louisa Adamson and Christian Barry with Andrew Cull* | Old Stock: A Refugee Love Story | 2b Theatre Company |
| Jean-Pierre Cloutier, Aaron Collier, Nick Bottomley, Deonie Hudson and Matt Miller | Princess Rules | Heist |
| Geofrey Dinwiddie | Snake in the Grass | Neptune Theatre |
| Sean Mulcahy | The Mystery Play | Ship's Company Theatre |
| Outstanding Lighting Design | Production | Company |
| Leigh Ann Vardy | I, Claudia | Felix Productions |
| Louisa Adamson and Christian Barry | Old Stock: A Refugee Love Story | 2b Theatre Company |
| Jean-Pierre Cloutier | Princess Rules | Heist |
| Ingrid Risk* | Snake in the Grass | Neptune Theatre |
| Leigh Ann Vardy | The Mystery Play | Ship's Company Theatre |
| Outstanding Costume Design | Production | Company |
| Andrew Cull | I, Claudia | Felix Productions |
| Helena Marriott | It's a Wonderful Life | Neptune Theatre |
| Jennifer Goodman | Nothing Less! | Two Planks and a Passion Theatre |
| Carly Beamish | Old Stock: A Refugee Love Story | 2b Theatre Company |
| Emlyn Murray* | Princess Rules | Heist |
| Outstanding Sound Design | Production | Company |
| Aaron Collier | I, Claudia | Felix Productions |
| Steven Naylor | Lullaby: Inside the Halifax Explosion | Eastern Front Theatre |
| Christian Barry, Ben Caplan, and Jordan Palmer | Old Stock: A Refugee Love Story | 2b Theatre Company |
| Aaron Collier* | Princess Rules | Heist |
| Brian Riley | The Archive of Missing Things | Zuppa Theatre |
| Outstanding Original Score | Production | Company |
| Ami McKay | Nothing Less! | Two Planks and a Passion Theatre |
| Ben Caplan and Christian Barry* | Old Stock: A Refugee Love Story | 2b Theatre Company |
| Garry Williams, with Jasmine Shenandoah Ashfield, Jeremy Hutton, Jesse MacLean, and Shanoa Phillips | Peter Pan | Shakespeare by the Sea |
| Aaron Collier | Princess Rules | Heist |
| Stewart Legere with Brian Riley | The Archive of Missing Things | Zuppa Theatre |
| Outstanding Musical Direction | Production | Company |
| Sarah Richardson | New Waterford Boy: A Ceilidh | Heist |
| Ami McKay | Nothing Less! | Two Planks and a Passion Theatre |
| Ben Caplan* | Old Stock: A Refugee Love Story | 2b Theatre Company |
| Scott Christian | Once | Neptune Theatre |
| Lisa MacDougall and Geordie Brown | The Songs of The Rat Pack | Geordie Brown Productions, presented by Neptune Theatre |
| Outstanding Play by a Nova Scotian Playwright | Production | Company |
| Adapted by Ben Stone, with the Company | At This Hour | Zuppa Theatre |
| Karen Bassett | Lullaby: Inside the Halifax Explosion | Eastern Front Theatre |
| Ken Schwartz and Ami McKay | Nothing Less! | Two Planks and a Passion Theatre |
| Hannah Moscovitch, Ben Caplan, and Christian Barry* | Old Stock: A Refugee Love Story | 2b Theatre Company |
| Aaron Collier with Jean-Pierre Cloutier and Richie Wilcox | Princess Rules | Heist |
| Outstanding Production by a New or Emerging Company | Company | |
| Bone Cage | Matchstick Theatre | |
| I, Claudia* | Felix Productions | |
| Next to Normal | Highland Arts Theatre | |
| Punch Up | Highland Arts Theatre | |
| Award for Outstanding Production | Company | |
| Dream By Fire | Two Planks and a Passion Theatre | |
| I, Claudia | Felix Productions | |
| Kingfisher Days | Festival Antigonish Summer Theatre | |
| Old Stock: A Refugee Love Story* | 2b Theatre Company | |
| Princess Rules | Heist | |

2018 Outstanding Theatre Technician: Sean Burke

2018 Outstanding Stage Manager: Louisa Adamson

2018 Outstanding Volunteer: Radovan Marinkovic & Brian McKenzie (Two Planks and a Passion Theatre) and Angela Butler (Theatre Arts Guild)

2018 Theatre Nova Scotia Legacy Award: Mary-Colin Chisholm

2018 Theatre Nova Scotia Scholarship: Stephanie MacDonald

2018 Wes Daniels Design Award: Villain's Theatre with Vicky Williams

2018 Neptune Theatre Chrysalis Emerging Artist Award: Laura Vingoe-Cram

=== 2017 ===
See references

| Outstanding Actor | Production | Company |
|---|---|---|
| Rhys Bevan John | Here Lies Henry | Chester Playhouse |
| Dan Bray | Pinocchio | Shakespeare by the Sea |
| Gordon Gammie | Little Thing Big Thing | Festival Antigonish Summer Theatre |
| Paul Rainville | King Lear | Shakespeare by the Sea |
| Jacob Sampson* | Chasing Champions: the Sam Langford Story | Ship's Company Theatre |
| Outstanding Actress | Production | Company |
| Francine Deschepper* | Little Thing Big Thing | Festival Antigonish Summer Theatre |
| Sarah English | How Do I Love Thee | Angels & Heroes |
| Jamie Konchak | Liberation Days | Two Planks and a Passion Theatre |
| Stephanie MacDonald | The Weekend Healer | KAZAN CO-OP |
| Amy Reitsma | Ruthless! The Stage Mother of All Musicals | Chester Playhouse |
| Outstanding Supporting Actor | Production | Company |
| Marty Burt* | Chasing Champions: the Sam Langford Story | Ship's Company Theatre |
| Andrew Gouthro | Sucker | Highland Arts Theatre |
| Graham Percy | Liberation Days | Two Planks and a Passion Theatre |
| Jeff Schwager | Liberation Days | Two Planks and a Passion Theatre |
| GaRRy Williams | King Lear | Shakespeare by the Sea |
| Outstanding Supporting Actress | Production | Company |
| Burgandy Code | Liberation Days | Two Planks and a Passion Theatre |
| Micha Cromwell | Chasing Champions: the Sam Langford Story | Ship's Company Theatre |
| Stephanie MacDonald | Liberation Days | Two Planks and a Passion Theatre |
| Kathryn MacLellan | The Weekend Healer | KAZAN CO-OP |
| Andrea Lee Norwood* | Goodnight Desdemona (Good Morning Juliet) | Valley Summer Theatre |
| Outstanding Choreography | Production | Company |
| Stephen Gray* | Beauty and the Beast | Neptune Theatre |
| Mary Lou Martin | Ruthless! The Stage Mother of All Musicals | Chester Playhouse |
| Jay Whitehead | The Princess Show | Angels & Heroes |
| Outstanding Direction | Production | Company |
| Dean Gabourie | The Weekend Healer | KAZAN CO-OP |
| Pamela Halstead | The Drowning Girls | DMV Theatre/Neptune Theatre |
| Ron Jenkins | Chasing Champions: the Sam Langford Story | Ship's Company Theatre |
| Ken Schwartz | Liberation Days | Two Planks and a Passion Theatre |
| Jeremy Webb* | Little Thing Big Thing | Festival Antigonish Summer Theatre |
| Outstanding Scenic Design | Production | Company |
| Set Design Garrett G. Barker, Projection Design Corwin Ferguson* | Chasing Champions: the Sam Langford Story | Ship's Company Theatre |
| Geofrey Dinwiddie | Beauty and the Beast | Neptune Theatre |
| Julie Fox | We Are Not Alone | 2b Theatre |
| Set Design Katherine Jenkins- Ryan, Video Design Vojin Vasovic | How Small, How Far Away | Zuppa Theatre |
| Katherine Jenkins-Ryan | The Drowning Girls | DMV Theatre/Neptune Theatre |
| Outstanding Lighting Design | Production | Company |
| Jessica Lewis | How Small, How Far Away | Zuppa Theatre |
| Jessica Lewis | The Drowning Girls | DMV Theatre/Neptune Theatre |
| Ingrid Risk | Small Things | Mulgrave Road Theatre, presented by Neptune Theatre |
| Leigh Ann Vardy | Beauty and the Beast | Neptune Theatre |
| Leigh Ann Vardy* | Chasing Champions: the Sam Langford Story | Ship's Company Theatre |
| Outstanding Costume Design | Production | Company |
| Paul Daigle | Beauty and the Beast | Neptune Theatre |
| Nicole Dowdall | Pinocchio | Shakespeare by the Sea |
| Jennifer Goodman | Liberation Days | Two Planks and a Passion Theatre |
| Helena Marriott | Miracle on 34th Street | Neptune Theatre |
| Sean Mulcahy* | Shrek! The Musical | Neptune Theatre |
| Outstanding Sound Design | Production | Company |
| Aaron Collier* | The Princess Show | Angels & Heroes |
| Adam Harendorf | Beauty and the Beast | Neptune Theatre |
| Joe Micallef | Chasing Champions: the Sam Langford Story | Ship's Company Theatre |
| Brian Riley | How Small, How Far Away | Zuppa Theatre |
| Thomas Ryder Payne in association with Peter Balov, Dylan Green, & Christian Barry | We Are Not Alone | 2b Theatre |
| Outstanding Original Score | Production | Company |
| Aaron Collier | The Princess Show | Angels & Heroes |
| Ian Sherwood & Lindsay Kyte* | Tompkinsville | Go Fly A Kyte Productions, presented by Eastern Front Theatre |
| John Spearns | The Drowning Girls | DMV Theatre/Neptune Theatre |
| GaRRy Williams | Pinocchio | Shakespeare by the Sea |
| Outstanding Musical Direction | Production | Company |
| Scott Christian | Shrek! The Musical | Neptune Theatre |
| Paul De Gurse | Beauty and the Beast | Neptune Theatre |
| Sarah Richardson* | Ruthless! The Stage Mother of All Musicals | Chester Playhouse |
| Outstanding Play by a Nova Scotian Playwright | Production | Company |
| Gillian Clark | Let's Try This Standing | Keep Good (Theatre) Company |
| Aaron Collier | The Princess Show | Angels & Heroes |
| Lindsay Kyte | Tompkinsville | Go Fly A Kyte Productions, presented by Eastern Front Theatre |
| Jacob Sampson* | Chasing Champions: the Sam Langford Story | Ship's Company Theatre |
| Outstanding Production by a New or Emerging Company | Company | |
| Constellations | Keep Good (Theatre) Company | |
| Let's Try This Standing | Keep Good (Theatre) Company | |
| Seminar | Kick at the Dark Theatre Company | |
| The Princess Show | Angels & Heroes | |
| Tompkinsville | Go Fly A Kyte Productions, presented by Eastern Front Theatre | |
| Award for Outstanding Production | Company | |
| Beauty and the Beast | Neptune Theatre | |
| Little Thing Big Thing | Festival Antigonish Summer Theatre | |
| Chasing Champions: the Sam Langford Story* | Ship's Company Theatre | |
| Liberation Days | Two Planks and a Passion Theatre | |
| The Drowning Girls | DMV Theatre/Neptune Theatre | |

2017 Outstanding Theatre Technician: Shawn Bisson

2017 Outstanding Stage Manager: Hannah Burrows

2017 Outstanding Volunteer: April Hubbard

2017 Theatre Nova Scotia Legacy Award: Deb Allen

2017 Theatre Nova Scotia Scholarship: Kyle Gillis

2017 Mayor's Award for Emerging Theatre Artist: Meghan Hubley

2017 Outstanding Presentation: “Friend” “Like” #Me, by Gavin Crawford (presented by Queer Acts Theatre Festival)

2017 Mayor's Award for Achievement in Theatre: Mary Lou Martin

=== 2016 ===
See references

| Outstanding Actor | Production | Company |
|---|---|---|
| Graham Percy | The Tempest | Two Planks and a Passion Theatre |
| Hugh Thompson | Messenger | Eastern Front Theatre |
| Marty Burt | The Tempest | Two Planks and a Passion Theatre |
| Stewart Legere* | I Am My Own Wife | Shakespeare by the Sea |
| Theo Pitsiavas | Hardboiled — A Sal Dali Crime Tale | LoHiFi Productions |
| Outstanding Actress | Production | Company |
| Burgandy Code | The Turn of the Screw | Two Planks and a Passion theatre |
| Francine Deschepper | Outside Mullingar | Festival Antigonish Summer Theatre |
| Jamie Konchak | The Tempest | Two Planks and a Passion Theatre |
| Jenny Munday | The Cave Painter | Eastern Front Theatre |
| Stephanie MacDonald* | Watching Glory Die | Mulgrave Road Theatre |
| Outstanding Supporting Actor | Production | Company |
| Christian Murray | The 39 Steps | Neptune Theatre |
| Christopher Little* | Hardboiled — A Sal Dali Crime Tale | LoHiFi Productions |
| Marty Burt | Great Expectations | Neptune Theatre |
| Matthew Lumley | The Pillowman | Fuller Terrace Five |
| Rhys Bevan-John | The 39 Steps | Neptune Theatre |
| Outstanding Supporting Actress | Production | Company |
| Andrea Lee Norwood | The Turn of the Screw | Two Planks and a Passion Theatre |
| Burgandy Cole | The Tempest | Two Planks and a Passion Theatre |
| Margaret Legere | Macbeth | WillPower Theatre in association with Off The Leash Creative |
| Mauralea Austin* | Outside Mullingar | Festival Antigonish Summer Theatre |
| Shelley Thompson | A Good Death | DaPoPo Theatre |
| Outstanding Choreography | Production | Company |
| Jim Morrow* (puppetry choreography) | The Tempest | Two Planks and a Passion Theatre |
| Kathryn MacLellan | Stacey and Liz — Two Women,Two True Stories | KAZAN CO-OP |
| Mary Lou Martin | The Highest Tides | Chester Playhouse |
| Stephanie Graham | The Addams Family | Neptune Theatre |
| Outstanding Direction | Production | Company |
| Christian Barry | Lungs | Festival Antigonish Summer Theatre |
| Dayna Tekatch | The 39 Steps | Neptune Theatre |
| Emmy Alcorn | Watching Glory Die | Mulgrave Road Theatre |
| Ken Schwartz* | The Tempest | Two Planks and a Passion Theatre |
| Theo Pitsiavas and Christopher Little | Hardboiled — A Sal Dali Crime Tale | LoHiFi Productions |
| Outstanding set and projection design | Production | Company |
| D'Arcy Morris-Poultney | The Cave Painter | Eastern Front Theatre |
| Garrett Barker | The Romeo Initiative | Ship's Company Theatre |
| Ian Pygott | Outside Mullingar | Festival Antigonish Summer Theatre |
| Katherine Ryan | I'll Be Back Before Midnight | Valley Summer Theatre |
| Theo Pitsiavas, Christopher Little, and Tony Owen* | Hardboiled — A Sal Dali Crime Tale | LoHiFi Productions |
| Outstanding Lighting Design | Production | Company |
| Ingrid Risk | Watching Glory Die | Mulgrave Road Theatre |
| Jessica Lewis | Broadway on Argyle St. | WillPower Theatre in association with Off The Leash Creative |
| Johnny Cann | Hardboiled — A Sal Dali Crime Tale | LoHiFi Productions |
| Leigh Ann Vardy* | The 39 Steps | Neptune Theatre |
| Susann Hudson | Macbeth | WillPower Theatre in association with Off The Leash Creative |
| Outstanding Costume Design | Production | Company |
| Helena Marriott | Great Expectations | Neptune Theatre |
| Jennifer Goodman* | The Tempest | Two Planks and a Passion Theatre |
| Leesa Hamilton | Hardboiled — A Sal Dali Crime Tale | LoHiFi Productions |
| Sarah Haydon Roy | Macbeth | WillPower Theatre in association with Off The Leash Creative |
| Sean Mulcahy | The Addams Family | Neptune Theatre |
| Outstanding Sound Design | Production | Company |
| Brian Riley* | Pop-Up Love Party | Zuppa Theatre |
| Daniel Oulton | Messenger | Eastern Front Theatre |
| Dustin Harvey and Shawn Bisson | Landline | Secret Theatre |
| Johnny Cann | Hardboiled — A Sal Dali Crime Tale | LoHiFi Productions |
| Rob Greene | I'll Be Back Before Midnight | Valley Summer Theatre |
| Outstanding Original Score | Production | Company |
| Allen Cole* | The Tempest | Two Planks and a Passion Theatre |
| Benjamin Marmen | Macbeth | WillPower Theatre in association with Off The Leash Creative |
| Michael Robson | The Duchess of Malfi | Villain's Theatre |
| Stewart Legere and David Christensen | Pop-Up Love Party | Zuppa Theatre |
| Tim Brady | GHOST TANGO | Vocalypse Productions |
| Outstanding Musical Direction | Production | Company |
| Allen Cole* | The Highest Tides | Two Planks and a Passion Theatre |
| Lisa St. Clair | Broadway on Argyle St. | WillPower Theatre in association with Off The Leash Creative |
| Scott Christian | The Addams Family | Neptune Theatre |
| Tim Brady | GHOST TANGO | Vocalypse Productions |
| Outstanding Play by a Nova Scotian Playwright | Production | Company |
| Dan Bray | Arden | Villain's Theatre |
| Ken Schwartz | The Turn of the Screw | Two Planks and a Passion Theatre |
| MG McIntyre | Spirits | Up The Hill Theatre Productions |
| Theo Pitsiavas* | Hardboiled — A Sal Dali Crime Tale | LoHiFi Productions |
| Wendy Lill | Messenger | Eastern Front Theatre |
| Outstanding Production by a New or Emerging Company | Company | |
| Spirits | Up The Hill Theatre Productions | |
| The Duchess of Malfi | Villain's Theatre | |
| The Story of a Sinking Man* | Kick at the Dark Theatre Company | |
| Outstanding Production by an Established Company | Company | |
| Hardboiled - A Sal Dali Crime Tale | LoHiFi Productions | |
| Outside Mullingar | Festival Antigonish | |
| Pop-Up Love Party | Zuppa Theatre Co. | |
| The 39 Steps | Neptune Theatre | |
| The Tempest* | Two Planks and a Passion Theatre | |
| The Turn of the Screw | Two Planks and a Passion Theatre | |

2016 Outstanding Theatre Technician: Justin Dakai

2016 Outstanding Stage Manager: Jane Creaser

2016 Outstanding Volunteer: Dean Taylor

2016 Theatre Nova Scotia Legacy Award: Bruce Klinger

2016 Theatre Nova Scotia Scholarship: GaRRy Williams and Ivy Charles

2016 Mayor's Award for Emerging Theatre Artist: Colleen MacIsaac

2016 Wes Daniel's Design Award: Rob Greene and Valley Summer Theatre

2016 Mayor's Award for Achievement in Theatre: Elizabeth Murphy

=== 2014 ===
See reference

| Award for Outstanding Actor | Production | Company |
|---|---|---|
| John Dartt | The Patron Saint of Stanley Park | Halifax Theatre for Young People |
| Gil Garratt | The Glace Bay Miner's Museum | Neptune Theatre (Halifax) and National Arts Centre |
| Geordie Johnson* | Red | Neptune Theatre (Halifax) |
| Muoi Nene | Refuge | Eastern Front Theatre & HomeFirst Productions |
| Jermey Webb | Under Milk Wood | Off The Leash |
| Award for Outstanding Actress | Production | Company |
| Francine Deschepper | The Patron Saint of Stanley Park | Halifax Theatre for Young People |
| Martha Irving* | Ghosts | LunaSea Theatre |
| Alexis Milligan | As You Like It | Two Planks and a Passion |
| Shelley Thompson | Criminal Genius | Festival Antigonish |
| Vanessa Walton-Bone | The Importance of Being Earnest | Neptune Theatre (Halifax) |
| Award for Outstanding Supporting Actor | Production | Company |
| Rhys Bevan-John | Much Ado About Nothing | Shakespeare by the Sea, Halifax |
| Glen Matthews | Diligent River Daughter | Ship's Company Theatre |
| Ryan Rogerson* | As You Like It | Two Planks and a Passion |
| Gordon White | Go To Hell | Hellish Theatre, Atlantic Fringe |
| GaRRY Williams | A Tournament of Lies | Us vs Them / Bus Stop Coop |
| Award for Outstanding Supporting Actress | Production | Company |
| Liz Gilroy | Legally Blonde | Neptune Theatre (Halifax) |
| Jamie Konchak* | As You Like It | Two Planks and a Passion |
| Margaret Legere | A Tournament of Lies | Us vs Them / Bus Stop Coop |
| Jenny Munday | Diligent River Daughter | Ship's Company Theatre |
| Elizabeth Richardson | The Importance of Being Earnest | Neptune Theatre (Halifax) |
| Award for Outstanding Direction | Production | Company |
| Christian Barry | The God That Comes | 2b theatre company |
| Anthony Black | Criminal Genius | Festival Antigonish |
| Eda Holmes* | Red | Neptune Theatre (Halifax) |
| Ken Schwartz | As You Like It | Two Planks and a Passion |
| Ken Schwartz | The Iiad | Two Planks and a Passion |
| Award for Outstanding Set Design | Production | Company |
| John Dinning* | Comedy of Errors | Neptune Theatre (Halifax) |
| Kathryn Jenkins Ryan & Vojin Vasovic | The Attaining Gigantic Dimensions | Zuppa Theatre |
| Sue LePage | The Glace Bay Miner's Museum | Neptune Theatre (Halifax) & National Arts Centre |
| Sean Mulcahy | The Importance of Being Earnest | Neptune Theatre (Halifax) |
| Sue LePage | Red | Neptune Theatre (Halifax) |
| Outstanding Lighting Design | Production | Company |
| Garrett Barker | Diligent River Daughter | Ship's Company Theatre |
| Nathaniel Bassett with Louisa Adamson | The Perfection of Man | Misery Loves Company |
| KLouise Guinand | Red | Neptune Theatre (Halifax) |
| Leigh Ann Vardy | The Glace Bay Miner's Museum | Neptune Theatre (Halifax) |
| Leigh Ann Vardy* | The God That Comes | 2b theatre company |
| Outstanding Costume Design | Production | Company |
| Leesa Hamilton with Cathleen MacCormack* | Uncle Oscar's Experiment | Zuppa Theatre |
| Sue LePage | The Glace Bay Miner's Museum | Neptune Theatre (Halifax) |
| Gary Markle | As You Like It | Two Planks and a Passion |
| Emlyn Murray | Ghosts | LunaSea Theatre |
| Andrea Ritchie | Diligent River Daughter | Ship's Company Theatre |
| Outstanding Sound Design | Production | Company |
| Allen Cole | As You Like It | Two Planks and a Passion |
| Jeremy Hutton | Snow White* | Shakespeare by the Sea, Halifax |
| Jason MacIsaac & David Christensen | Uncle Oscar's Experiments | Zuppa Theatre |
| Jenny Trites | The Roaring Girl | Vile Passeist Theatre |
| Hawksley Workman & Christian Barry | The God That Comes | 2b theatre company2 |
| Outstanding Musical Direction | Production | Company |
| Patrick Burwell | Legally Blonde | Neptune Theatre (Halifax) |
| Allan Cole | As You Like It | Two Planks and a Passion |
| Jeremy Hutton | Snow White* | Shakespeare by the Sea, Halifax |
| Jason MacIsaac & David Christensen | Uncle Oscar's Experiment | Zuppa Theatre |
| Hawksley Workman, Christian Barry, Todd Lumley | The God That Comes | 2b theatre company |
| Award for Outstanding Play by a Nova Scotian Playwright | Production | Company |
| Christian Barry, Hawksley Workman* | The God That Comes | 2b theatre company |
| Shakespeare by the Sea | Snow White | Shakespeare by the Sea, Halifax |
| Ken Schwartz | The Iliad | Two Planks and a Passion |
| Mary Vingoe | Refuge | Eastern Front Theatre & HomeFirst Productions |
| Award for Outstanding Production | Company | |
| As You Like It | Two Planks and a Passion | |
| Red* | Neptune Theatre (Halifax) | |
| The Glace Bay Miner's Museum | Neptune Theatre (Halifax) & National Arts Centre | |
| The God That Comes | 2b theatre company | |
| Uncle Oscar's Experiment | Zuppa Theatre Co. | |

2014 Legacy Award for Achievement for Outstanding Contribution to Theatre in Nova Scotia: Christopher Shore

2014 Mayor's Award for Achievement in Theatre: John Dartt

2014 Mayor's Award for Emerging Theatre Artist: Evan Brown

2014 Outstanding Theatre Technician: Matthew Downey

2014 Outstanding Stage Manager: Sarah O'Brien

2014 Nova Scotia Theatre Volunteer of the Year Award: Kevin Kindred, Austin Reade

=== 2013 ===
See reference

| Award for Outstanding Actor | Production | Company |
|---|---|---|
| Ben Stone | Slowly I Turn | Zuppa Theatre |
| Hugh Thompson* | Whale Riding Weather | Plutonium Playhouse |
| Hugo Dann | Whale Riding Weather | Plutonium Playhouse |
| Michael McPhee | Bone Boy | Frankie Productions |
| Stephen Gallagher | La Cage aux Folles (musical) | Neptune Theatre |
| Award for Outstanding Actress | Production | Company |
| Andrea Lee Norwood | Educating Rita | Valley Summer Theatre |
| Anne-Marie Kerr* | Funny Money | Festival Antigonish |
| Martha Irving | The Monument | LunaSea Theatre |
| Joanne Miller | Same Time, Next Year | Festival Antigonish |
| Jenny Munday | Communion | Kazan Co-op |
| Award for Outstanding Supporting Actor | Production | Company |
| David Lopez | La Cage aux Folles (musical) | Neptune Theatre |
| Graham Percy | Lysistrata: Temptress of the South | Two Planks and a Passion Theatre |
| Jeff Schwager* | Intimate Apparel | Neptune Theatre |
| Ryan Doucette | Whale Riding Weather | Plutonium Playhouse |
| Wade Lynch | Mrs. Parliament's Night Out | Neptune Theatre |
| Award for Outstanding Supporting Actress | Production | Company |
| Stephanie MacDonald* | Communion | Kazan Co-op |
| Joanne Miller | Odd Ducks | Chester Playhouse |
| Kathryn MacCormack | Alice in Wonderland | Shakespeare by the Sea, Halifax |
| Lesley Smith | Intimate Apparel | Neptune Theatre |
| Keelin Jack | Touch | The Doppler Effect |
| Award for Outstanding Direction | Production | Company |
| Anthony Black & Christian Barry* | The Story of Mr. Wright | 2b theatre company |
| Christian Barry | Funny Money | Festival Antigonish |
| Graham Percy | Slowly I Turn | Zuppa Theatre Co. |
| Ken Schwartz | Lysistrata: Temptress of the South | Two Planks and a Passion Theatre |
| Linda Moore* | Communion | Kazan Co-op |
| Philip Akin | Intimate Apparel | Neptune Theatre |
| Award for Outstanding Set Design | Production | Company |
| Evan Brown | The Monument | LunaSea Theatre |
| Leesa Hamilton* | Slowly I Turn | Zuppa Theatre Co. |
| Sean Mulcahy | Intimate Apparel | Neptune Theatre |
| Shahin Sayadi & Michael Mader | Hawk or How He Plays His Song | Onelight Theatre |
| Wes Daniels | Bone Boy | Frankie Prod. |
| Outstanding Lighting Design | Production | Company |
| Ingrid Risk* | "i,Animal" | Kazan Co-op |
| Ingrid Risk & Leigh Ann Vardy | Communion | Kazan Co-op |
| Kate Selleck | The Story of Mr. Wright | 2b theatre company |
| Leigh Ann Vardy | Bone Boy | Frankie Prod. |
| Michael Mader | Hawk or How He Plays His Song | Onelight Theatre |
| Outstanding Costume Design | Production | Company |
| Crystal MacDonnell* | La Cage aux Folles (musical) | Neptune Theatre |
| Janet MacLellan | Educating Rita | Valley Summer Theatre |
| Janet MacLellan | Odd Ducks | Chester Playhouse |
| Leesa Hamilton | Lysistrata:Temptress of the South | Two Planks and a Passion Theatre |
| Sean Mulcahy | Intimate Apparel | Neptune Theatre |
| Outstanding Sound Design | Production | Company |
| Aaron Collier* | Domestic Train Wreck | Angels & Heroes Theatre |
| Aaron Collier | "i,Animal" | Kazan Co-op |
| Christopher Mitchell | Pluto's Playthings | Plutonium Playhouse |
| Jeremy Hutton | Alice in Wonderland | Shakespeare by the Sea, Halifax |
| Nick Bottomley | Hawk or How He Plays His Song | Onelight Theatre |
| Outstanding Original Composition or Score | Production | Company |
| Allen Cole* | Lysistrata: Temptress of the South | Two Planks and a Passion Theatre |
| Dinuk Wijeratne | Hawk or How He Plays His Song | Onelight Theatre |
| Garry Williams | The Jew of Malta | Vile Passeist Theatre |
| Jason MacIsaac & Stewart Legere | Pluto's Playthings | Plutonium Playhouse |
| Jess Lewis | Slowly I Turn | Zuppa Theatre Co. |
| Steven Naylor | A Brown Bear, A Moon & A Caterpillar | Mermaid Theatre |
| Award for Outstanding Play by a Nova Scotian Playwright | Production | Company |
| Daniel MacIvor* | Communion | Kazan Co-op |
| Ben Stone | Slowly I Turn | Zuppa Theatre Co. |
| Christian Murray | Bone Boy | Frankie Prod. |
| Collective Creation | The Story of Mr. Wright | 2b theatre company |
| Company Collective | Alice in Wonderland | Shakespeare by the Sea, Halifax |
| Award for Outstanding Production | Company | |
| The Story of Mr. Wright | 2b theatre company | |
| Funny Money | Festival Antigonish | |
| Communion | Kazan Co-op | |
| Whale Riding Weather | Plutonium Playhouse | |
| Lysistrata: Temptress of the South | Two Planks and a Passion Theatre | |
| Slowly I Turn* | Zuppa Theatre Co. | |

2013 Legacy Award for Achievement for Outstanding Contribution to Theatre in Nova Scotia: Shakespeare by the Sea, Halifax

2013 Mayor's Award for Achievement in Theatre: Hugo Dann

2013 Mayor's Award for Emerging Theatre Artist: Stephanie MacDonald

2013 Outstanding Theatre Technician: Garrett Barker

2013 Outstanding Stage Manager: Sarah O'Brien

2013 Nova Scotia Theatre Volunteer of the Year Award: Dick Sircom

=== 2012 ===
See reference

| Award for Outstanding Actor | Production | Company |
|---|---|---|
| John Beale | Bingo! | Mulgrave Road Theatre |
| John Beale | Brightest Red to Blue | Forerunner Playwrights' Theatre |
| Walter Borden* | Driving Miss Daisy | Valley Summer Theatre |
| Brian Heighton | The Ugly One | DMV Theatre |
| Graham Percy | Vigil | Valley Summer Theatre |
| Award for Outstanding Actress | Production | Company |
| Sara Farb | The Passion of Adele Hugo | Eastern Front Theatre |
| Carolyn Hetherington* | Driving Miss Daisy | Valley Summer Theatre |
| Martha Irving | The (Post) Mistress | Ship's Company Theatre |
| Marla McLean | Blithe Spirit (play) | Neptune Theatre (Halifax) |
| Heather Rankin | Bingo! | Mulgrave Road Theatre |
| Award for Outstanding Supporting Actor | Production | Company |
| Martin Burt | The Passion of Adele Hugo | Eastern Front Theatre |
| Martin Burt | Bingo! | Mulgrave Road Theatre |
| Sebastien Labelle | When It Rains | 2b Theatre Company |
| Graham Percy | Driving Miss Daisy | Valley Summer Theatre |
| Hugh Thompson* | The Beauty Queen of Leenane | Neptune Theatre (Halifax) |
| Award for Outstanding Supporting Actress | Production | Company |
| Emmy Alcorn | Bingo! | Mulgrave Road Theatre |
| Francine Deschepper* | When It Rains | 2b theatre company |
| Margot Dionne | Blithe Spirit (play) | Neptune Theatre (Halifax) |
| Amanda Leblanc | The Passion of Adele Hugo | Eastern Front Theatre |
| Alexis Milligan | Beowulf | Two Planks and a Passion Theatre |
| Award for Outstanding Director | Production | Company |
| Anthony Black | When it Rains | 2b theatre |
| Rosemary Dunsmore | The Beauty Queen of Leenane | Neptune Theatre (Halifax) |
| Ann-Marie Kerr | The Debacle | Zuppa Theatre Co. |
| Daniel MacIvor | Bingo! | Mulgrave Road Theatre |
| Linda Moore* | Driving Miss Daisy | Valley Summer Theatre |
| Award for Outstanding Set Design | Production | Company |
| Anthony Black & Nick Bottomley | When it Rains | 2b theatre |
| Andrew Cull | Brightest Red to Blue | Forerunner Playwrights’ Theatre |
| Geofrey Dinwiddie | Blithe Spirit (play) | Neptune Theatre (Halifax) |
| Ann-Marie Kerr & Susan Leblanc-Crawford | The Debacle | Zuppa Theatre Co. |
| Victoria Marsten | Vigil Valley | Summer Theatre |
| Sean Mulcahy* | The Beauty Queen of Leenane | Neptune Theatre (Halifax) |
| Outstanding Lighting Designer | Production | Company |
| Nick Bottomley | When it Rains | 2b theatre |
| Jessica Lewis | The Ugly One | DMV Theatre |
| Ingrid Risk | Brightest Red to Blue | Forerunner Playwrights’ Theatre |
| Leigh Ann Vardy* | The Beauty Queen of Leenane | Neptune Theatre (Halifax) |
| Leigh Ann Vardy | Blithe Spirit (play) | Neptune Theatre (Halifax) |
| Outstanding Costume Designer | Production | Company |
| Patrick Clark* | Blithe Spirit (play) | Neptune Theatre (Halifax) |
| Crystal MacDonnell | West Side Story | Neptune Theatre (Halifax) |
| Adam MacKinnon | The Passion of Adele Hugo | Eastern Front Theatre |
| Janet MacLellan | Driving Miss Daisy | Valley Summer Thea |
| Outstanding Sound Designer Original Score | Production | Company |
| Mark Adam | Beowulf | Two Planks and a Passion Theatre |
| Christian Barry | When it Rains | 2b theatre |
| Aaron Collier | The Ugly One | DMV Theatre |
| Zachary Florence* | The Passion of Adele Hugo | Eastern Front Theatre |
| Sandy Moore | Driving Miss Daisy | Valley Summer Theatre |
| Outstanding Musical Direction | Production | Company |
| Holly Arsenault | The (Post) Mistress | Ship's Company Theatre |
| Chuck Homewood | West Side Story | Neptune Theatre (Halifax) |
| Jeremy Hutton | Robin Hood | Shakespeare by the Sea, Halifax |
| Lily Ling | The Passion of Adele Hugo | Eastern Front Theatre |
| Lisa St. Clair | Jacques Brel is Alive and Well and Living in Paris | Chester Playhouse |
| Award for Outstanding Play by a Nova Scotian Playwright | Production | Company |
| Karen Bassett | Heroine | Run Through Productions |
| Anthony Black | When it Rains | 2b theatre |
| Ann-Marie Kerr & Susan Leblanc-Crawford | The Debacle | Zuppa Theatre Co. |
| Daniel MacIvor | Bingo! | Mulgrave Road Theatre |
| David Overton | The Passion of Adele Hugo | Eastern Front Theatre |
| Graham Percy | Brightest Red to Blue | Forerunner Playwrights’ Theatre |
| Award for Outstanding Production | Company | |
| Bingo! | Mulgrave Road Theatre | |
| Blithe Spirit | Neptune Theatre (Halifax) | |
| Driving Miss Daisy* | Valley Summer Theatre | |
| The Debacle | Zuppa Theatre Co. | |
| Vigil | Valley Summer Theatre | |
| When it Rains | 2b theatre | |

2012 Legacy Award for Achievement for Outstanding Contribution to Theatre in Nova Scotia: Marguerite McNeil

2012 Mayor's Award for Achievement in Theatre: Bryden MacDonald

2012 Mayor's Award for Emerging Theatre Artist: Lee-Anne Poole

2012 Outstanding Theatre Technician: Ingrid Risk

2012 Outstanding Stage Manager: Heather Lewis

2012 Nova Scotia Theatre Volunteer of the Year Award: Alleen and David Parsons

=== 2011 ===
See reference

| Award for Outstanding Actor | Production | Company |
|---|---|---|
| Anthony Black | Invisible Atom | 2b theatre company |
| Glen Matthews | Logan and I | The Doppler Effect |
| Michael McPhee | Fat Pig | Plutonium Playhouse |
| Robert Seale | Woman In Black | Valley Summer Theatre |
| Graham Percy* | The Crucible | Two Planks and a Passion Theatre |
| Award for Outstanding Actress | Production | Company |
| Deborah Allen | Cloudburst | Plutonium Playhouse |
| Mary-Colin Chisholm | Woman and Scarecrow | Luna/Sea Theatre |
| Jennifer Overton | Fall in Paris | Eastern Front Theatre |
| Jackie Torrens | 7 Stories | Neptune Theatre (Halifax) |
| Sue Leblanc* | 5 Easy Steps to the End of the World | Zuppa Theatre |
| Award for Outstanding Supporting Actor | Production | Company |
| John Dartt | Merlin | Halifax Theatre for Young People |
| John Beale* | The Crucible | Two Planks and a Passion Theatre |
| Ryan Doucette | Cloudburst | Plutonium Playhouse |
| Matthew Lumley | Fat Pig | Plutonium Playhouse |
| Scott Owen | Twelfth Night | Shakespeare by the Sea, Halifax |
| Award for Outstanding Supporting Actress | Production | Company |
| Susan Stackhouse* | Rabbit Hole | Neptune Theatre (Halifax) |
| Jessica Barry | Fat Pig | Plutonium Playhouse |
| Burgandy Code | The Crucible | Two Planks and a Passion Theatre |
| Amy Reitsma | Julius Caesar | DaPoPo Theatre |
| Sherry Smith | Woman and Scarecrow | Luna/Sea Theatre |
| Award for Outstanding Director | Production | Company |
| Jean Murporgo* | Maggie's Getting Married | Festival Antigonish |
| Mary-Colin Chisholm | Lauchie, Liza and Rory | Frankie Productions |
| Pamela Halstead | Woman in Black | Valley Summer Theatre |
| Alex McLean, Ann-Marie Kerr | 5 Easy Steps to the End of the World | Zuppa Theatre |
| Mary Vingoe | To Capture Light | Mulgrave Road Theatre |
| Award for Outstanding Set Design | Production | Company |
| Louisa Adamson | 5 Easy Steps to the End of the World | Zuppa Theatre |
| Thom Fitzgerald | Cloudburst | Plutonium Playhouse |
| Ken MacDonald | 7 Stories | Neptune Theatre (Halifax) |
| Stephen Osler | Lauchie, Liza and Rory | Frankie Productions |
| Victoria Marsten* | The Net | Ship's Company Theatre"' |
| Outstanding Lighting Designer | Production | Company |
| Louisa Adamson* | 5 Easy Steps to the End of the World | Zuppa Theatre |
| Michael Fuller | The Net | Ship's Company Theatre |
| Will Perkins | Woman in Black | Valley Summer Theatre |
| Leigh Ann Vardy | Invisible Atom | 2b theatre company |
| Leigh Ann Vardy | The Wizard of Oz | Neptune Theatre (Halifax) |
| Outstanding Costume Designer | Production | Company |
| Jennifer Coe | To Capture Light | Mulgrave Road Theatre |
| Leesa Hamilton | The Crucible | Two Planks and a Passion Theatre |
| Leesa Hamilton | 5 Easy Steps to the End of the World | Zuppa Theatre |
| Edward Ledson | The Wizard of Oz | Neptune Theatre (Halifax) |
| Arianne Pollet-Brannen* | Vonda de Ville in Temporal Follies | Vocalypse Productions |
| Outstanding Sound or Original Music | Production | Company |
| David Christensen & Jason MacIsaac | 5 Easy Steps to the End of the World | Zuppa Theatre |
| Paul Cram | The Net | Ship's Company Theatre |
| Lukas Pearse | Vonda de Ville in Temporal Follies | Vocalypse Productions |
| Terry Pulliam* | Woman in Black | Valley Summer Theatre |
| Terry Pulliam | Merlin | Halifax Theatre for Young People |
| Award for Outstanding Play by a Nova Scotian Playwright | Production | Company |
| Karen Bassett | Heroine | Run Through Productions |
| Thom Fitzgerald* | Cloudburst | Plutonium Playhouse |
| Michael McPhee | Logan and I | The Doppler Effect |
| Lee-Anne Poole | Splinters | Plutonium Playhouse |
| Zuppa Theatre Co. | 5 Easy Steps to the End of the World | Zuppa Theatre |
| Award for Outstanding Production | Company | |
| Cloudburst | Plutonium Playhouse | |
| 5 Easy Steps to the End of the World* | Zuppa Theatre | |
| Lauchie, Liza and Rory | Frankie Productions | |
| The Crucible | Two Planks and a Passion Theatre | |
| Woman in Black | Valley Summer Theatre | |

2011 Legacy Award for Achievement for Outstanding Contribution to Theatre in Nova Scotia: Wendy Lill

2011 Mayor's Award for Achievement in Theatre:

2011 Mayor's Award for Emerging Theatre Artist:

2011 Outstanding Theatre Technician: Christopher Francis Mitchell

2011 Outstanding Stage Manager: Sarah O'Brien

2011 Nova Scotia Theatre Volunteer of the Year Award: Anne Mackay and Walter Carey

=== 2010 ===
See reference

| Award for Outstanding Actor | Production | Company |
|---|---|---|
| Marty Burt | Rockbound | Two Planks and a Passion Theatre |
| David Patrick Flemming | East of Berlin | 2b theatre company |
| Duncan Fraser* | No Great Mischief | Neptune Theatre (Halifax) |
| Stuart Hughes | Doubt, A Parable | Neptune Theatre (Halifax) |
| Ron Pedersen | Extinction Song | Eastern Front Theatre |
| Award for Outstanding Actress | Production | Company |
| Kathryn MacLellan | A Beautiful View | Neptune Theatre (Halifax) |
| Sherry Smith | The Sunnyside Cafe | Forerunner Playwrights Theatre |
| Shelly Thompson* | Glorious | Festival Antigonish |
| Jackie Torrens | A Beautiful View | Neptune Theatre (Halifax) |
| Vanessa Walton-Bone | Twelfth Night | Luna/Sea Theatre |
| Award for Outstanding Supporting Actor | Production | Company |
| John Dunsworth | No Great Mischief | Neptune Theatre (Halifax) |
| Bill Forbes | Ivor Johnson's Neighbours | Ship's Company Theatre |
| Bill Wood* | East of Berlin | 2b theatre company |
| Billy MacLellan | No Great Mischief | Neptune Theatre (Halifax) |
| Ed Thomason | East of Berlin | 2b theatre company |
| Award for Outstanding Supporting Actress | Production | Company |
| Burgandy Code* | Rockbound | Two Planks and a Passion Theatre |
| Ann-Marie Kerr | Homage | 2b theatre company |
| Katie Swift | East of Berlin | 2b theatre company |
| Mary Vingoe | Ivor Johnson's Neighbours | Ship's Company Theatre |
| Genevieve Steele | Twelfth Night | Luna/Sea Theatre |
| Award for Outstanding Director | Production | Company |
| Ken Schwartz* | Rockbound | Two Planks and a Passion Theatre |
| Christian Barry | East of Berlin | 2b theatre company |
| Ron Jenkins | Extinction Song | Eastern Front Theatre |
| Daniel MacIvor | A Beautiful View | Neptune Theatre (Halifax) |
| Richard Rose | No Great Mischief | Neptune Theatre (Halifax) |
| Award for Outstanding Set Design | Production | Company |
| Louisa Adamson* | Poor Boy | Zuppa Theatre & Neptune Theatre (Halifax) |
| Peter Blackie | Homage | 2b theatre company |
| Andrew Cull | East of Berlin | 2b theatre company |
| Geoffrey Dinwiddle | A Christmas Carol- The Musical | Neptune Theatre (Halifax) |
| D'Arcy Morris-Poultney | The Toxic Bus Incident | Onelight Theatre |
| Outstanding Lighting Designer | Production | Company |
| Will Perkins* | Homage | 2b theatre company |
| Bruce MacLennan | Extinction Song | Eastern Front Theatre |
| Mike Mader | Return Ticket: Halifax-Abadan-Halifax | Onelight Theatre |
| Will Perkins | East of Berlin | 2b theatre company |
| Ingrid Risk | A Beautiful View | Neptune Theatre (Halifax) |
| Outstanding Costume Designer | Production | Company |
| Rosie Browning | Rockbound | Two Planks and a Passion Theatre |
| Jennifer Coe & Jenn Mills | Glorious | Festival Antigonish |
| Patrick Clarke* | The Game of Love and Chance | Neptune Theatre (Halifax) |
| Leesa Hamilton | East of Berlin | 2b theatre company |
| D'Arcy Morris-Poultney | A Christmas Carol- The Musical | Neptune Theatre (Halifax) |
| Outstanding Sound or Original Music | Production | Company |
| Brian Buckle | A Christmas Carol | Off the Leash |
| Brian Buckle | Return Ticket: Halifax-Abadan-Halifax | Onelight Theatre |
| Mike Ross* | No Great Mischief | Neptune Theatre (Halifax) |
| Michael Doherty | Homage | 2b theatre company |
| Terry Pulliam | The Gravesavers | Halifax Theatre for Young People |
| Outstanding Original Music or Score | Production | Company |
| David Christensen & Jason MacIsaac | Poor Boy | Zuppa Theatre & Neptune Theatre (Halifax) |
| Eric Hughes | A Christmas Carol- The Musical | Neptune Theatre (Halifax) |
| Allen Cole* | Rockbound | Two Planks and a Passion Theatre |
| Dinuk Wijeratne | Return Ticket: Halifax-Abadan-Halifax | Onelight Theatre |
| Dinuk Wijeratne | The Toxic Bus Incident | Onelight Theatre |
| Award for Outstanding Play by a Nova Scotian Playwright | Production | Company |
| Beverly Brett | Out the Meadow | Forerunner Playwrights Theatre |
| Christopher Helde | The Gravesavers | Halifax Theatre for Young People |
| Allen Cole* | Rockbound | Two Planks and a Passion Theatre |
| Ron Jenkins | Extinction Song | Eastern Front Theatre |
| Daniel MacIvor | A Beautiful View | Neptune Theatre (Halifax) |
| Award for Outstanding Production | Company | |
| A Beautiful View | The Distinct Theatre Society & Neptune Theatre (Halifax) | |
| Rockbound* | Two Planks and a Passion Theatre | |
| East of Berlin | 2b theatre company | |
| Extinction Song | Eastern Front Theatre | |
| No Great Mischief | Neptune Theatre (Halifax) | |

2010 Legacy Award for Achievement for Outstanding Contribution to Theatre in Nova Scotia: Jean Murporgo

2010 Mayor's Award for Achievement in Theatre: Jeremy Webb

2010 Mayor's Award for Emerging Theatre Artist: Natasha MacLellan

2010 Outstanding Stage Manager or Theatre Technician: Sylvia Bell

2010 Nova Scotia Theatre Volunteer of the Year Award: Perry Kossatz & Aaron Harpell

=== 2009 ===
See reference

| Award for Outstanding Actor | Production | Company |
|---|---|---|
| Troy Adams | Othello | Shakespeare by the Sea, Halifax |
| John Beale | The Peggy Show | Old Red Schoolhouse Productions |
| Marty Burt | The Musical of Musicals | Chester Playhouse |
| Graham Percy | Our Town | Two Planks and a Passion Theatre |
| Jeremy Webb* | Othello | Shakespeare by the Sea, Halifax |
| Award for Outstanding Actress | Production | Company |
| Mary Colin Chisholm | Talking Heads: An Evening of Alan Bennett Monologues | Luna/Sea Theatre |
| Colombe Demers | The Russian Play | 2b theatre company |
| Kristin Howell | The Musical of Musicals | Chester Playhouse |
| Deborah Kipp | The Retreat From Moscow | Neptune Theatre (Halifax) |
| Sherry Smith* | Happy Days | Neptune Theatre (Halifax) |
| Award for Outstanding Supporting Actor | Production | Company |
| John Beale | Girl in the Goldfish Bowl | Luna/Sea Theatre |
| Andrew Gillies* | The Devil's Disciple | Neptune Theatre (Halifax) |
| John Fitzgerald Jay | Gaslight | Festival Antigonish |
| Cliff LeJeune | The Producers | Neptune Theatre (Halifax) |
| Ryan Rogerson | Jerome: The Historical Spectacle | Two Planks and a Passion Theatre |
| Award for Outstanding Supporting Actress | Production | Company |
| Mauralea Austin* | Girl in the Goldfish Bowl | Luna/Sea Theatre |
| Burgandy Code | Our Town | Two Planks and a Passion Theatre |
| Melody Johnson | Our Town | Two Planks and a Passion Theatre |
| Kathryn MacLellan | Girl in the Goldfish Bowl | Luna/Sea Theatre |
| Genevieve Steele | Grace | Festival Antigonish |
| Award for Outstanding Director | Production | Company |
| Ken Schwartz* | Our Town | Two Planks and a Passion Theatre |
| Martha Irving | Girl in the Goldfish Bowl | Luna/Sea Theatre |
| Mary Lou Martin | The Musical of Musicals | Chester Playhouse |
| Elizabeth Murphy | Othello | Shakespeare by the Sea, Halifax |
| Theo Pitsiavas | Grandma Noda's Tigers | Irondale Ensemble Project |
| Award for Outstanding Set Design | Production | Company |
| Martin J. Conboy | Happy Days | Neptune Theatre (Halifax) |
| John Dinning | Dear Santa | Eastern Front Theatre |
| Romain Fabre | Masked | Neptune Theatre (Halifax) |
| Corey Mullins | Snow Dance | Ship's Company Theatre |
| John Thompson* | The Retreat From Moscow | Neptune Theatre (Halifax) |
| Outstanding Lighting Designer | Production | Company |
| Martin J. Conboy* | Happy Days | Neptune Theatre (Halifax) |
| Bruce MacLennan | Snow Dance | Ship's Company Theatre |
| Graeme S. Thompson | Leo | Neptune Theatre (Halifax) |
| Leigh Ann Vardy | The Retreat From Moscow | Neptune Theatre (Halifax) |
| Leigh Ann Vardy | Masked | Neptune Theatre (Halifax) |
| Outstanding Costume Designer | Production | Company |
| David Boechler | The Devil's Disciple | Neptune Theatre (Halifax) |
| Paul Daigle | The Producers | Neptune Theatre (Halifax) |
| Denyse Karn* | Jerome: The Historical Spectacle | Two Planks and a Passion Theatre |
| Janet MacLellan | Girl in the Goldfish Bowl | Luna/Sea Theatre |
| Marilyn McLaren | Vimy | Eastern Front Theatre |
| Outstanding Sound or Original Score | Production | Company |
| Anthony Black | Masked | Neptune Theatre (Halifax) |
| Allen Cole & Ami McKay* | Jerome: The Historical Spectacle | Two Planks and a Passion Theatre |
| Amos Crawley & Jonathan Eaton | Cinderelly | Shakespeare by the Sea, Halifax |
| Michael Doherty | BUMP | Ship's Company Theatre |
| Michael Doherty | Vimy | Eastern Front Theatre |
| Award for Outstanding Play by a Nova Scotian Playwright | Production | Company |
| Chris Little* | Grandma Noda's Tigers | Irondale Ensemble Project |
| John Beale & Graham Percy | The Peggy Show | Old Red Schoolhouse |
| Daniel Lillford | Snow Dance | Ship's Company Theatre |
| Mauralea Austin, Mary-Colin Chisolm, Martha Irving, Sherry Smith | To Capture Light | Luna/Sea Theatre |
| Ami McKay | Jerome: The Historical Spectacle | Two Planks and a Passion Theatre |
| Award for Outstanding Production | Company | |
| Girl in the Goldfish Bowl | Luna/Sea Theatre | |
| Grandma Noda's Tigers* | Irondale Ensemble Project | |
| Othello | Shakespeare by the Sea | |
| Our Town | Two Planks and a Passion Theatre | |
| The Musical of Musicals | Chester Playhouse | |
The Retreat from Moscow / Neptune Theatre (Halifax)

2009 Achievement for Outstanding Contribution to Theatre in Nova Scotia: Sara Lee Lewis

2009 Mayor's Award for Achievement in Theatre: Gay Hauser

2009 Mayor's Award for Emerging Theatre Artist: Stewart Legere

2009 Outstanding Stage Manager or Theatre Technician: Eleanor Creelman

2009 Nova Scotia Theatre Volunteer of the Year Award: Brian MacLeod

=== 2008 ===
See reference

| Award for Outstanding Actor | Production | Company |
|---|---|---|
| Lee J. Campbell | The Drawer Boy | Atlantic Theatre Festival |
| Brian Heighton | How I Learned to Drive | DMV Theatre Co-op |
| Stephen McCarthy* | Storyteller | 2b theatre company |
| Raymond O'Neill | The Drawer Boy | Atlantic Theatre Festival |
| Graham Percy | The Odyssey | Two Planks and a Passion Theatre |
| Award for Outstanding Actress | Production | Company |
| Valerie Buhagiar | The Veil | One Light / Neptune Theatre (Halifax) / Mermaid Theatre |
| Francine Deschepper | The Odyssey | Two Planks and a Passion Theatre |
| Nicola Lipman | Shirley Valentine | Atlantic Theatre Festival |
| Andrea Lee Norwood* | The Miracle Worker | Neptune Theatre (Halifax) |
| Sherry Smith | Perfect Pie | Luna/Sea Theatre |
| Award for Outstanding Supporting Actor | Production | Company |
| Réjean Cournoyer | Beauty and the Beast | Neptune Theatre (Halifax) |
| Simon Henderson | Mourning Dove | Neptune Theatre (Halifax) |
| Stewart Legere* | Penny Dreadful | Zuppa Circus Theatre |
| Stewart Legere | Antigone | Angels and Heroes |
| Jeremy Webb | Beauty and the Beast | Neptune Theatre (Halifax) |
| Award for Outstanding Supporting Actress | Production | Company |
| Burgandy Code* | The Odyssey | Two Planks and a Passion Theatre |
| Karen Bassett | By the Dark of the Moon | Mulgrave Road Theatre |
| Sharon Bajer | Boeing, Boeing | Festival Antigonish |
| Sarah English | Bone Cage | Forerunner Playwright's Theatre / Ship's Company Theatre |
| Martha Irving | Beauty and the Beast | Neptune Theatre (Halifax) |
| Award for Outstanding Director | Production | Company |
| Christian Barry* | Revisited | 2b theatre company |
| Richard Donat | The Drawer Boy | Atlantic Theatre Festival |
| Pamela Halstead | How I Learned to Drive | DMV Theatre Co-op |
| Marcia Kash | The Price | Neptune Theatre (Halifax) |
| Ken Schwartz | The Odyssey | Two Planks and a Passion Theatre |
| Award for Outstanding Set Design | Production | Company |
| Patrick Clark* | The Price | Neptune Theatre (Halifax) |
| The Company | Revisited | 2b theatre company |
| Michael Fuller | MacGregor's Hard Ice Cream and Gas | Ship's Company Theatre |
| Stephen Osler | Shirley Valentine | Atlantic Theatre Festival |
| Shanin Sayadi & Jake Dambergs | The Veil | One Light / Neptune Theatre (Halifax) / Mermaid Theatre |
| Outstanding Lighting Designer | Production | Company |
| Christian Barry* | Revisited | 2b theatre company |
| Bruce MacLennan | MacGregor's Hard Ice Cream and Gas | Ship's Company Theatre |
| Leigh Ann Vardy | The Drawer Boy | Atlantic Theatre Festival |
| Leigh Ann Vardy | Shirley Valentine | Atlantic Theatre Festival |
| Leigh Ann Vardy | The Price | Neptune Theatre (Halifax) |
| Outstanding Costume Designer | Production | Company |
| Patrick Clark | White Christmas | Neptune Theatre (Halifax) |
| Paul Daigle | Beauty and the Beast | Neptune Theatre (Halifax) |
| Jennifer Darbellay* | The Odyssey | Two Planks and a Passion Theatre |
| D'arcy Morris-Poultney | The Veil | One Light / Neptune Theatre (Halifax) / Mermaid Theatre |
| Helene Siebrits | Boeing, Boeing | Festival Antigonish |
| Outstanding Sound or Original Score | Production | Company |
| Brian Buckle | The Veil | One Light / Neptune Theatre (Halifax) / Mermaid Theatre |
| Richard Feren | Revisited | 2b theatre company |
| David Christensen & Jason MacIsaac* | Penny Dreadful | Zuppa Circus Theatre |
| Sandy Moore | By the Dark of the Moon | Mulgrave Road Theatre |
| Terry Pulliam | Bone Cage | Forerunner Playwright's Theatre / Ship's Company Theatre |
| Award for Outstanding Play by a Nova Scotian Playwright | Production | Company |
| Catherine Banks | Bone Cage | Forerunner Playwright's Theatre / Ship's Company Theatre |
| Christian Barry, Steven McCarthy & Michelle Monteith | Revisited | 2b theatre company |
| Shanin Sayadi* | The Veil | One Light / Neptune Theatre (Halifax) / Mermaid Theatre |
| Zuppa Circus Theatre | Penny Dreadful | Zuppa Circus Theatre |
| Award for Outstanding Production | Company | |
| Revisited | 2b theatre company | |
| The Miracle Worker | Neptune Theatre (Halifax) | |
| The Odyssey* | Two Planks and a Passion Theatre | |
| The Price | Neptune Theatre (Halifax) | |
| The Veil | One Light / Neptune Theatre (Halifax) / Mermaid Theatre | |

2008 Achievement for Outstanding Contribution to Theatre in Nova Scotia: Addy Doucette

2008 Mayor's Award for Achievement in Theatre: Mary-Colin Chisholm

2008 Mayor's Award for Emerging Theatre Artist: Christian Barry

2008 Outstanding Stage Manager or Theatre Technician: Lisa Cochran

2008 Nova Scotia Theatre Volunteer of the Year Award: Gary Bugden

=== 2007 ===
| Award for Outstanding Actor | Production | Company |
|---|---|---|
| Nigel Bennett | Who's Afraid of Virginia Woolf? | Neptune Theatre (Halifax) |
| Robert Benson | Trying | Neptune Theatre (Halifax) |
| Shane Carty | This is How It Goes | Neptune Theatre (Halifax) |
| Réjean Cournoyer | God's Middle Name | In Good Company |
| Graham Percy* | Noises Off | Atlantic Theatre Festival |
| Award for Outstanding Actress | Production | Company |
| Kristen Bell | This is How It Goes | Neptune Theatre (Halifax) |
| Ingrid Rae Doucet | The Mystery of Maddy Heisler | Ship's Company Theatre |
| Carolyn Hetherington* | Lillibet | Ship's Company Theatre |
| Jennifer Overton | God's Middle Name | In Good Company |
| Fiona Reid | Who's Afraid of Virginia Woolf? | Neptune Theatre (Halifax) |
| Genevieve Steele | Educating Rita | Festival Antigonish |
| Award for Outstanding Supporting Actor | Production | Company |
| Richard Donat* | Fool For Love | F4L Productions |
| Benjamin Hollingsworth | A Few Good Men | Neptune Theatre (Halifax) |
| Cliff Le Jeune | Berlin to Broadway | Chester Playhouse |
| Mike Macphee | The Wizard of Uh Oz | Shakespeare by the Sea, Halifax |
| Christopher Shore | Corvette Crossing | Eastern Front Theatre |
| Award for Outstanding Supporting Actress | Production | Company |
| Mary Colin Chisholm | The Little Years | Neptune Theatre (Halifax) |
| Sherry Lee Hunter | Noises Off | Atlantic Theatre Festival |
| Martha Irving | Berlin to Broadway | Chester Playhouse |
| Julain Molnar | Oliver! | Neptune Theatre (Halifax) |
| Patricia Zentilli* | Noises Off | Atlantic Theatre Festival |
| Award for Outstanding Director | Production | Company |
| Nigel Bennett | Noises Off | Atlantic Theatre Festival |
| Scott Burke | God's Middle Name | Eastern Front Theatre |
| Leah Chemiak | The Little Years | Neptune Theatre (Halifax) |
| Daryl Cloran* | This is How It Goes | Neptune Theatre (Halifax) |
| Ted Dykstra | A Few Good Men | Neptune Theatre (Halifax) |
| Linda Moore | Fool For Love | F4L Productions |
| Award for Outstanding Set Design | Production | Company |
| Patrick Clark | A Few Good Men | Neptune Theatre (Halifax) |
| Neil Peter Jampolis* | Noises Off | Atlantic Theatre Festival |
| Stephen Osler | Fool For Love | F4L Productions |
| Lorenzo Savoini | This is How It Goes | Neptune Theatre (Halifax) |
| Nigel Scott | The Little Years | Neptune Theatre (Halifax) |
| Outstanding Lighting Designer | Production | Company |
| Bruce MacLennan | The Mystery of Maddy Heisler | Ship's Company Theatre |
| Thistle Theatre Designer | The Woman in Black | Festival Antigonish |
| Leigh Ann Vardy* | A Few Good Men | Neptune Theatre (Halifax) |
| Leigh Ann Vardy | Corvette Crossing | Eastern Front Theatre |
| Leigh Ann Vardy | The Little Years | Neptune Theatre (Halifax) |
| Outstanding Costume Designer | Production | Company |
| Patrick Clark* | Noises Off | Atlantic Theatre Festiva |
| Patrick Clark | Oliver! | Neptune Theatre (Halifax) |
| John C. Dining | Annie | Neptune Theatre (Halifax) |
| Denyse Karn | Educating Rita | Festival Antigonish |
| Art Penson | Evita | Neptune Theatre (Halifax) |
| Art Penson | Who's Afraid of Virginia Woolf? | Neptune Theatre (Halifax) |
| Outstanding Sound or Original Score | Production | Company |
| Paul Cram | Corvette Crossing | Eastern Front Theatre |
| Marc Desaormeaux | The Little Years | Ship's Company Theatre |
| Michael Doherty* | The Mystery of Maddy Heisler | Zuppa Circus Theatre |
| 'Sandy Moore | Fool For Love | F4L Productions |
| Jake Wilkinson | Noises Off | Atlantic Theatre Festival |
| Award for Outstanding Play by a Nova Scotian Playwright | Production | Company |
| Anthony Black, Connor Green | Soul Alone | Neptune Theatre (Halifax) |
| Daniel Lillford | The Mystery of Maddy Heisler | Ship's Company Theatre |
| Daniel MacIvor | How It Works | Eastern Front Theatre |
| Michael Melski | Corvette Crossing | Mulgrave Road Theatre |
| Jennifer Overton* | God's Middle Name | In Good Company |
| Award for Outstanding Production | Company | |
| A Few Good Men | Neptune Theatre (Halifax) | |
| God's Middle Name* | In Good Company | |
| Noises Off | Atlantic Theatre Festival | |
| This is How It Goes | Neptune Theatre (Halifax) | |

2007 Achievement for Outstanding Contribution to Theatre in Nova Scotia: Jenny Munday

2007 Mayor's Award for Achievement in Theatre: Mary Vingoe

2007 Mayor's Award for Emerging Theatre Artist: Richie Wilcox

2007 Outstanding Stage Manager or Theatre Technician: Louisa Adamson

2007 Nova Scotia Theatre Volunteer of the Year Award: Ian Gilmore

=== 2006 ===
| Award for Outstanding Actor | Production | Company |
|---|---|---|
| Andrew Musselman | Stones in His Pockets | Festival Antigonish |
| Jeremiah Sparks | The Satchmo Suite | Eastern Front Theatre |
| Kevin Curran* | Gay White Trash | Fat Morgan Theatre |
| Larry Yachimec | Frozen | Neptune Theatre (Halifax) |
| Michael Ferguson | Brighter Than the Light of the Sun | Ship's Company Theatre |
| Nigel Bennett | The Goat, or Who Is Sylvia? | Neptune Theatre (Halifax) |
| Award for Outstanding Actress | Production | Company |
| Carmen Grant* | The Syringa Tree | Neptune Theatre (Halifax) |
| Margot Sampson | Joni Mitchell: The River | Festival Antigonish |
| Michelle Monteith | The Diary of Anne Frank | Neptune Theatre (Halifax) |
| Nicola Lipman | The Diary of Anne Frank | Neptune Theatre (Halifax) |
| Raquel Duffy | Miss Julie | Neptune Theatre (Halifax) |
| Tara Doyle | Gay White Trash | Fat Morgan Theatre |
| Award for Outstanding Supporting Actor | Production | Company |
| Cameron MacDuffee | Chicago | Neptune Theatre (Halifax) |
| Christian Murray | Cat on a Hot Tin Roof | Neptune Theatre (Halifax) |
| Doug Macleod | The Diary of Anne Frank | Neptune Theatre (Halifax) |
| Geoff McBride | The Diary of Anne Frank | Neptune Theatre (Halifax) |
| Ian Deakin | The Sound of Music | Neptune Theatre (Halifax) |
| Michael Pellerin* | Annie | Neptune Theatre (Halifax) |
| Award for Outstanding Supporting Actress | Production | Company |
| Catherine O’Connor | The Sound of Music | Neptune Theatre (Halifax) |
| Julain Molnar* | The Sound of Music | Neptune Theatre (Halifax) |
| Martha Irving | To Kill A Mockingbird | Neptune Theatre (Halifax) |
| Martha Irving | The Diary of Anne Frank | Neptune Theatre (Halifax) |
| Sherry Smith | To Kill A Mockingbird | Neptune Theatre (Halifax) |
| Award for Outstanding Director | Production | Company |
| Anthony Black & Christian Barry | Manners of Dying | 2b theatre company |
| David Kennedy | Brighter Than the Light of the Sun | Ship's Company Theatre |
| Ed Thomason | Stones in His Pockets | Festival Antigonish |
| Hans Boggild | The Satchmo Suite | Eastern Front Theatre |
| Mary Lou Martin | The Fantasticks | Chester Playhouse |
| Ted Dykstra* | The Diary of Anne Frank | Neptune Theatre (Halifax) |
| Outstanding Set Designer | Production | Company |
| Anthony Black, Louisa Adamson | Manners of Dying | 2b theatre company |
| Denyse Karn* | Brighter than the Light of the Sun | Ship's Company Theatre |
| John C. Dining | Annie | Neptune Theatre (Halifax) |
| Patrick Clark | The Diary of Anne Frank | Neptune Theatre (Halifax) |
| Patrick Clark | To Kill A Mockingbird | Neptune Theatre (Halifax) |
| Outstanding Lighting Designer | Production | Company |
| Aaron Newbert | God of Hell | Neptune Theatre (Halifax) |
| Leigh Ann Vardy* | The Diary of Anne Frank | Neptune Theatre (Halifax) |
| Leigh Ann Vardy | Manners of Dying | 2b theatre company |
| Martin Conboy | The Syringa Tree | Neptune Theatre (Halifax) |
| Matthew Richards | Brighter than the Light of the Sun | Ship's Company Theatre |
| Outstanding Costume Designer | Production | Company |
| Douglas Paraschuk | Cat on a Hot Tin Roof | Neptune Theatre (Halifax) |
| Erin Gore | The Fantasticks | Chester Playhouse |
| John C. Dining | Annie | Neptune Theatre (Halifax) |
| Patrick Clark* | The Diary of Anne Frank | Neptune Theatre (Halifax) |
| Patrick Clark | To Kill A Mockingbird | Neptune Theatre (Halifax) |
| Outstanding Sound or Original Score | Production | Company |
| Brian Buckle | Spin | Mulgrave Road Theatre |
| David Christensen | Open Theatre Kitchen | Zuppa Circus Theatre |
| David Christensen & Jason MacIssac | Radium City | Zuppa Circus Theatre |
| Frederick Kennedy* | Brighter Than the Light Of the Sun | Ship's Company Theatre |
| Hans Boggild, Doug Innis | The Satchmo Suite | Eastern Front Theatre |
| John Kilawee | Manners of Dying | 2b theatre company |
Outstanding Stage Manager or Theatre Technician
Louisa Adamson
Robin Cheesman
Donna MacMillan*
Bruce Blakemore
| Award for Outstanding Play by a Nova Scotian Playwright | Production | Company |
| Christian Barry, Anthony Black | Manners of Dying | 2b theatre company |
| David Kennedy | Brighter Than the Light Of the Sun | Ship's Company Theatre |
| Karen Basset | Thrive | Irondale Ensemble |
| Michael Best* | Gay White Trash | Fat Morgan Theatre |
| Robert Plowman | Radium City | Zuppa Circus Theatre |
| Shahin Sayadi | The Death of Yazdgerd | OneLight Theatre |
| Award for Outstanding Production | Company | |
| Frozen | Neptune Theatre (Halifax) | |
| Gay White Trash | Fat Morgan Theatre | |
| Manners of Dying | 2b theatre company | |
| Stones in His Pockets | Festival Antigonish | |
| The Syringa Tree | Neptune Theatre (Halifax) | |
| The Diary of Anne Frank* | Neptune Theatre (Halifax) | |

2006 Achievement for Outstanding Contribution to Theatre in Nova Scotia: Joan Orenstein

2006 Emerging Artist Award: Susan Leblanc-Crawford

2006 Mayor's Award for Achievement in Theatre: Michael Melski

2006 Mayor's Award for Emerging Theatre Artist: Ben Stone

2006 Nova Scotia Theatre Company Volunteer Awards: Jennifer Josenhans, Andrea Dymond, Diane Regan, Lawrence Tuttle

=== 2005 ===
| Award for Outstanding Actor | Production | Company |
|---|---|---|
| Nigel Bennett | Parrsboro Boxing Club | Ship's Company Theatre |
| Réjean Cournoyer | Portia White: First You Dream | Eastern Front Theatre |
| Kevin Curran | Proof | Neptune Theatre (Halifax) |
| Connor Green | Cherry Docs | Bunnies in the Headlights Theatre |
| Peter McNeil | Death of a Salesman | Neptune Theatre (Halifax) |
| Graham Percy | A Kind of Faith | Willpower Theatre |
| Steven Sutcliffe* | The Rocky Horror Show | Neptune Theatre (Halifax) |
| Award for Outstanding Actress | Production | Company |
| Burgandy Code | Westray: The Long Way Home | Two Planks and a Passion Theatre |
| Mary Colin Chisolm | He'd Be Your Mother's Father's Cousin | Mulgrave Road Theatre |
| Ingrid Rae Doucet | Trout Stanley | Ship's Company Theatre |
| Raquel Duffy* | Mary's Wedding | Ship's Company Theatre |
| Carmen Grant | Proof | Neptune Theatre (Halifax) |
| Shelley Thompson | Humble Boy | Festival Antigonish |
| Award for Outstanding Director | Production | Company |
| Scott Burke, Pam Halstead | The Parrsboro Boxing Club | Ship's Company Theatre |
| Christian Barry | Cherry Docs | Bunnies in the Headlights Theatre |
| Ann Marie Kerr | Invisible Atom | Festival Antigonish |
| Neil Munro | Death of a Salesman | Neptune Theatre (Halifax) |
| Ron Ulrich* | The Rocky Horror Show | Neptune Theatre (Halifax) |
| Outstanding Set Designer | Production | Company |
| Peter Hartwell | Death of a Salesman | Ship's Company Theatre |
| Denyse Karn* | The Parrsboro Boxing Club | Ship's Company Theatre |
| Denyse Karn | Mary's Wedding | Eastern Front Theatre |
| Art Penson | Proof | Neptune Theatre (Halifax) |
| Art Penson | The Rocky Horror Show | Neptune Theatre (Halifax) |
| Outstanding Lighting Designer | Production | Company |
| Bruce MacLellan | Parrsboro Boxing Club | Ship's Company Theatre |
| Leigh Ann Vardy* | The Rocky Horror Show | Neptune Theatre (Halifax) |
| Leigh Ann Vardy | Death of a Salesman | Neptune Theatre (Halifax) |
| Leigh Ann Vardy | Cats | Neptune Theatre (Halifax) |
| Outstanding Costume Designer | Production | Company |
| Peter Hartwell | Death of a Salesman | Neptune Theatre (Halifax) |
| Krista Levy | Parrsboro Boxing Club | Ship's Company Theatre |
| Krista Levy | Mary's Wedding | Eastern Front Theatre |
| Art Penson* | The Rocky Horror Show | Neptune Theatre (Halifax) |
| Outstanding Sound or Original Score | Production | Company |
| Michael Doherty | Parrsboro Boxing Club | Ship's Company Theatre |
| Jeff Hennessy | Westray: The Long Way Home | Two Planks and a Passion Theatre |
| Frederick Kennedy | Trout Stanley | Ship's Company Theatre |
| Sandy Moore | Portia White: First You Dream | Eastern Front Theatre |
| John Scott* | Mary's Wedding | Eastern Front Theatre |
Outstanding Stage Manager or Theatre Technician
Louisa Adamson
Robin Cheesman
Donna MacMillan
Zeph Williams*
Bruce Blakemore
| Award for Outstanding Play by a Nova Scotian Playwright | Production | Company |
| Scott Burke | Parrsboro Boxing Club | Ship's Company Theatre |
| Anthony Black | Invisible Atom | Festival Antigonish |
| Ken Schwartz, Chris O'Neill | Westray: The Long Way Home | Two Planks and a Passion Theatre |
| Award for Outstanding Production | Company | |
| Death of a Salesman | Neptune Theatre (Halifax) | |
| Humble Boy | Festival Antigonish | |
| Parrsboro Boxing Club | Ship's Company Theatre | |
| The Rocky Horror Show* | Neptune Theatre (Halifax) | |
| Westray: The Long Way Home | Two Planks and a Passion Theatre | |

2005 Achievement for Outstanding Contribution to Theatre in Nova Scotia: Linda Moore

2005 Emerging Artist Award: Alex MacLean

2005 Mayor's Award for Achievement in Theatre: Linda Moore

2005 Mayor's Award for Emerging Theatre Artist: Anthony Black

2005 Nova Scotia Theatre Company Volunteer Awards: Joanne Porter, Val and Cliff Tyner, Debbie Ross, Michelle Herx, Carmel Rooney

=== 2004 ===
| Award for Outstanding Actor | Production | Company |
|---|---|---|
| David Fox* | Jacob's Wake | Ship's Company Theatre |
| Connor Green | Cherry Docs | Bunnies in the Headlights Theatre |
| Frank MacKay | Chairmaker, The Musical | Ship's Company Theatre |
| Jim Mezon | Copenhagen | Neptune Theatre (Halifax) |
| Christian Murray | Lauchie, Liza and Rory | Mulgrave Road Theatre |
| Hugh Thompson | Jacob's Wake | Ship's Company Theatre |
| Award for Outstanding Actress | Production | Company |
| Burgandy Code* | Lauchie, Liza and Rory | Mulgrave Road Theatre |
| Mary Colin Chisolm | He'd Be Your Mother's Father's Cousin | Mulgrave Road Theatre |
| Nicola Lipman | Blithe Spirit | Atlantic Theatre Festival |
| Nicola Lipman | Collected Stories | Neptune Theatre (Halifax) |
| Carly Street | Into The Woods | Atlantic Theatre Festival |
| Award for Outstanding Director | Production | Company |
| Scott Burke | Chairmaker, The Musical | Ship's Company Theatre |
| Christian Barry | Cherry Docs | Bunnies in the Headlights Theatre |
| Mary Colin Chisolm | Lauchie, Liza and Rory | Mulgrave Road Theatre |
| Alex MacLean | Uncle Oscar's Experiment | Zuppa Circus Theatre |
| Carol Rosenfeld | Collected Stories | Neptune Theatre (Halifax) |
| R.H. Thompson* | Jacob's Wake | Ship's Company Theatre |
| Outstanding Set Designer | Production | Company |
| Patrick Clark | One for the Pot | Neptune Theatre (Halifax) |
| Patrick Clark | Sleeping Beauty | Neptune Theatre (Halifax) |
| Steven Osler | Chairmaker, The Musical | Ship's Company Theatre |
| Steven Osler* | Jacob's Wake | Ship's Company Theatre |
| Doug Paraschuk | Copenhagen | Neptune Theatre (Halifax) |
| Outstanding Lighting Designer | Production | Company |
| Bruce MacLellan* | Jacob's Wake | Ship's Company Theatre |
| Bruce MacLellan | Chairmaker, The Musical | Ship's Company Theatre |
| Leigh Ann Vardy | Copenhagen | Neptune Theatre (Halifax) |
| Leigh Ann Vardy | Into the Woods | Neptune Theatre (Halifax) |
| Martin Conboy | Blood on the Moon | Neptune Theatre (Halifax) |
| Outstanding Costume Designer | Production | Company |
| Patrick Clark* | Into the Woods | Neptune Theatre (Halifax) |
| Patrick Clark | One for the Pot | Neptune Theatre (Halifax) |
| Patrick Clark | Sleeping Beauty | Neptune Theatre (Halifax) |
| Michael Eagan | Les Liaisons Dangereuses | Neptune Theatre (Halifax) |
| Denyse Karn | Jacob's Wake | Ship's Company Theatre |
Outstanding Stage Manager or Theatre Technician
Louisa Adamson
Robin Cheesman
Donna MacMillan
Christine Oakey*
Ian Pygott
| Award for Outstanding Play by a Nova Scotian Playwright | Production | Company |
| Scott Burke | Chairmaker, The Musical | Ship's Company Theatre |
| Sheldon Currie* | Lauchie, Liza and Rory | Mulgrave Road Theatre |
| Josh MacDonald | Halo | Two Planks and a Passion Theatre |
| Christopher Shore | Liar | Eastern Front Theatre |
| Jackie Torrens | Georama | Two Planks and a Passion Theatre |
| Award for Outstanding Production | Company | |
| Into the Woods | Neptune Theatre (Halifax) | |
| Cherry Docs | Bunnies in the Headlights Theatre | |
| Lauchie, Liza and Rory | Mulgrave Road Theatre | |
| Collected Stories | Neptune Theatre (Halifax) | |
| Jacob's Wake* | Ship's Company Theatre | |

2004 Achievement for Outstanding Contribution to Theatre in Nova Scotia: Jest in Time Theatre

2004 Mayor's Award for Achievement in Theatre: Steven Cross

2004 Nova Scotia Theatre Company Volunteer Awards: Mike Hodgson, Bill and Esther VanGorder, Gordon Tate, Pauline Liengme, Jeremy Webb

=== 2003 ===
| Award for Outstanding Actor | Production | Company |
|---|---|---|
| Andrew Bigelow | Kilt | Neptune Theatre (Halifax) |
| Andrew Bigelow | Mary's Wedding | Ship's Company Theatre |
| Réjean Cournoyer | Private Views | Willpower Theatre |
| Darren Keay | Tourist Trap | Chester Playhouse |
| Graham Percy* | Charley's Aunt | Atlantic Theatre Festival |
| Kevin Curran | Fables | Eastern Front Theatre |
| Award for Outstanding Actress | Production | Company |
| Raquel Duffy | I Do! I Do! | Festival Antigonish |
| Trish Lindstrom | Mary's Wedding | Ship's Company Theatre |
| Mary Ellen MacLean | Frankie | Jest in Time Theatre |
| Jennifer Overton | Kilt | Neptune Theatre (Halifax) |
| Jennifer Overton | Kilt | Neptune Theatre (Halifax) |
| Marla McLean* | The Miracle Worker | Atlantic Theatre Festival |
| Award for Outstanding Director | Production | Company |
| Hans Boggild | Island | Eastern Front Theatre |
| Scott Burke* | Mary's Wedding | Ship's Company Theatre |
| Alex MacLean | The Tragedy of Nasfuratu | Zuppa Circus theatre |
| Jim Morrow | Goodnight Opus | Mermaid Theatre |
| The Pitsavas | A Loosely Veiled Allegory | Irondale Ensemble Project |
| Ed Thomasen | Private Views | Willpower Theatre |
| Outstanding Set Designer | Production | Company |
| Patrick Clark* | Charley's Aunt | Atlantic Theatre Festival |
| Denyse Karn | Mary's Wedding | Ship's Company Theatre |
| Murray Elliott | Tourist Trap | Chester Playhouse |
| Stephen Britton Osler | Chairmaker, the Musical | Ship's Company Theatre |
| Jim Morrow | Goodnight Opus | Mermaid Theatre |
| Outstanding Lighting Designer | Production | Company |
| Bruce MacLellan* | Mary's Wedding | Ship's Company Theatre |
| Ian Pygott | Self Help | Festival Antigonish |
| Wally Snow | Island | Eastern Front Theatre |
| Peter Tyrell | Tales Rare and Grim | Exodus Theatre |
| Leigh Ann Vardy | Sylvia | Neptune Theatre (Halifax) |
| Outstanding Costume Designer | Production | Company |
| Denise Barrett | Buddy, The Buddy Holly Story | Neptune Theatre (Halifax) |
| Patrick Clark* | Charley's Aunt | AtlanticTheatre Festival |
| Jan Cogley | The Miracle Worker | AtlanticTheatre Festival |
| Denyse Kam | Kilt | Neptune Theatre (Halifax) |
| Krista Levy | Chairmaker, The Musical | Ship's Company Theatre |
Outstanding Stage Manager or Theatre Technician
Donna MacMillan
Ian Pygott
Jane Butler*
Judy Joe
Christine Oakey
| Award for Outstanding Play by a Nova Scotian Playwright | Production | Company |
| Sarah Blenhorn, Nate Crawford, Sarah Gignac & Emily Taylor | Tales Rare and Grim | Exodus Theatre |
| Jackie Torrens, Ed Thomasen, Mary Colin Chisholm & Bruce Barton | Private Views | Willpower Theatre |
| Jackie Torrens | Fables | Mulgrave Road Theatre |
| Jackie Torrens | Live Nude Animal | Mulgrave Road Theatre |
| Lance Woolaver | World Without Shadows | Festival Antigonish |
| Award for Outstanding Production | Company | |
| The Miracle Worker | Atlantic Theatre Festival | |
| Kilt | Neptune Theatre (Halifax) | |
| A Loosely Veiled Allegory | Irondale Ensemble Project | |
| Mary's Wedding* | Ship's Company theatre | |
| Private Views | Willpower Theatre | |
| The Tragedy of Nosferatu | Zuppa Circus Theatre | |

2003 Achievement for Outstanding Contribution to Theatre in Nova Scotia: David Renton

2003 Nova Scotia Theatre Company Volunteer Awards: Murdock MacDonald, Darlene Spears, John and Lyn Gratwick, John Slor, Ernest Zinck, Kathleen Smith, Doris Salsman, Penny Schofield, Gleneida Canning, Charlie Rhindress, Debbie Ross, Ian Waller, Mary Ritchie, Linda Hodgins, Gord Tate, Lauriena Noel, Dale Sanford

=== 2002 ===
| Award for Outstanding Actor | Production | Company |
|---|---|---|
| Lionel Doucette | For the Pleasure of Seeing Her Again | Festival Antigonish |
| Hugh Thompson | A Streetcar Named Desire | Atlantic Theatre Festival |
| Nigel Bennett | Art | Neptune Theatre (Halifax) |
| John Dunsworth* | The Drawer Boy | Eastern Front Theatre |
| Christopher Shore | The Complete Wrks of Wllm Shkspr (Abridged) | Neptune Theatre (Halifax) |
| Award for Outstanding Actress | Production | Company |
| Mary Ellen MacLean | Trip | Jest in Time Theatre |
| Susan Stackhouse | For the Pleasure of Seeing Her Again | Festival Antigonish |
| Nicola Lipman* | Wit | Neptune Theatre (Halifax) |
| Jody Stevens | The Afterlife of George Cartwright | Willpower Theatre |
| Mary-Colin Chisholm | Sisters | Eastern Front Theatre |
| Award for Outstanding Director | Production | Company |
| Leon Pownell | A Streetcar Named Desire | Atlantic Theatre Festival |
| Jim Morrow | The Very Hungry Caterpillar & the Very Quiet Cricket | Mermaid Theatre |
| Charlie Rhindress | The Complete Wrks of Wllm Shkspr (Abridged) | Neptune Theatre (Halifax) |
| Mary Vingoe | The Drawer Boy | Eastern Front Theatre |
| Linda Moore* | Trip | Jest in Time Theatre |
| Scott Burke | The Last Tasmanian | Ship's Company Theatre |
| Outstanding Set Designer | Production | Company |
| Denyse Karn* | The Afterlife of George Cartwright | Willpower Theatre |
| Denyse Karn | The Hobbit | Atlantic Theatre Festival |
| Leigh Ann Vardy | Trip | Jest in Time Theatre |
| Leigh Ann Vardy | The Drawer Boy | Eastern Front Theatre |
| Jim Morrow | The Very Hungry Caterpillar & the Very Quiet Cricket | Mermaid Theatre |
| Award for Outstanding Play by a Nova Scotian Playwright | Production | Company |
| Michael Melski | Hockey Mom, Hockey Dad | Two Planks and a Passion Theatre |
| Mary Ellen MacLean | Frankie | Festival Antigonish |
| Christopher Shore* | Liar | Alive Theatre |
| Catherine Banks | Three Story Ocean View | Mulgrave Road Theatre |
| Wendy Lill | Sisters | Eastern Front Theatre |
| Jest in Time Theatre | Best of Jest | Jest in Time Theatre |
| Michael Melski | Miles from Home | Ship's Company Theatre |
| Award for Outstanding Production | Company | |
| Handmade and Sleeptracks | Jest in Time Theatre | |
| Trip* | Jest in Time Theatre | |
| The Drawer Boy | Eastern Front Theatre | |
| The Very Hungry Caterpillar & the Very Quiet Cricket | Mermaid Theatre | |
| Best of Jest | Jest in Time Theatre | |
| Irondale Dance Chronicled | Irondale Ensemble Project | |
| A Streetcar Named Desire | Atlantic Theatre Festival | |
Award for Outstanding Stage Manager or Theatre Technician
Donna MacMillan
Ian Pygott
Jane Butler
Judy Joe*
Christine Oakey

2002 Nova Scotia Theatre Company Volunteer Awards: Stan Salsman, Penny Dann, Robin Saywood, Iris Elliott, Judy & Austin Reade, Shelley Gullikson, Janet Hodder, Barney Morison, Cathy Macarthur, Sylvelin Oakey, Ernie MacLaughlin, Mary Ritchie, Jane Kansas, Lynn Buckley, Rona MacQuillan, Jim Mills, Catherine Banks, Bruce McCulloch, Susan Wolfraim, Gerald Parker
