= Plutonium Playhouse =

- Address: Halifax; Canada

Construction
- Opened: 2010

The Plutonium Playhouse is a theatre company in Halifax, Nova Scotia, Canada that began as a non-profit society in 2010. Plutonium Playhouse Society initially mounted shows in a recording studio on Hunter Street in Halifax.

Plutonium is known for its development and encouragement of new work by Nova Scotia playwrights like Thom Fitzgerald, Lee-Anne Poole, Ryan Doucette, and Stewart Legere. A number of works originally presented by Plutonium Playhouse have gone on to tours and remounts across Canada, including Short Skirt Butch, The Debacle, El Camino or the Field of Stars, and Cloudburst, which was made into a popular movie starring Academy Award winners Olympia Dukakis and Brenda Fricker and Ryan Doucette, and won over thirty film festival best picture awards.

The company is also known for its popular program The Sex Festival, which presents plays, readings and events on the subjects of sex and sexuality.

== Artistic directors ==
- Thom Fitzgerald (2010–present)

== Production history ==
Plutonium Playhouse Society was involved in producing or presenting the following productions:

PRODUCTIONS

- 7 Deadly Sins by Thom Fitzgerald
- The Asshole Monologues by Jane Kansas
- Balls by Rob Salerno
- The Barnacle's Tale by Thom Fitzgerald
- Cloudburst by Thom Fitzgerald
- The Debacle by Susan Leblanc
- Down Dangerous Passes Road by Michel Marc Bouchard
- El Camino or the Field of Stars by Stewart Legere
- Fat Pig by Neil LaBute
- Kinky Kitten Club by Lee-Anne Poole
- Logan and I by Michael McPhee
- Ms. Right Now by Natasha MacLellan
- The Obedients by Lee-Anne Poole
- Pluto's Playthings by Thom Fitzgerald
- Pourquoi pas? by Ryan Doucette
- A Rescue Demonstration by Stewart Legere and Katie Swift
- Short Skirt Butch by Lee-Anne Poole
- Splinters by Lee-Anne Poole
- Whale Riding Weather by Bryden MacDonald

PUBLIC READINGS

- That's Happiness by Nate Crawford
- With Bated Breath by Bryden MacDonald
- His Greatness by Daniel MacIvor

== Critical response ==
Critical response to the works of Plutonium Playhouse Society has been generally positive. Ron Foley MacDonald called the original production of Cloudburst "a knockout" and the company "the most exciting thing to happen on the Halifax Theatre scene in a decade" Kate Watson wrote of the Plutonium production of Fat Pig, "The performances in this production are outstanding... Fat Pig is funny, touching, sexy and thought-provoking." while The Dalhousie Gazette proclaimed the show "pushed the audience’s comfort level." Independent critic Amanda Campbell praised Plutonium Playhouse's production of Rob Salerno's Balls as "tender, insightful and intelligent" and Plutonium's production of A Barnacle's Tale "literate, oddly insightful, strange, ridiculous, very unique and fun."

Works in The Sex Festival have been particularly well received. Kate Watson of The Coast Weekly called The Asshole Monologues "hilarious and charming" and named Plutonium's production of Whale Riding Weather one of the Ten Best productions of 2012.

== Awards and nominations ==
- Robert Merritt Awards Outstanding New Play by a Nova Scotia Playwright: Thom Fitzgerald, Cloudburst
- Robert Merritt Awards Nomination Outstanding Actress in a Leading Role: Deb Allen, Cloudburst
- Robert Merritt Awards Nomination Outstanding Actor in a Supporting Role: Ryan Doucette, Cloudburst
- Robert Merritt Awards Nomination Outstanding Set Design: Thom Fitzgerald, Cloudburst
- Robert Merritt Awards Nomination Outstanding Production, Cloudburst
- Robert Merritt Awards Nomination Outstanding New Play by a Nova Scotia Playwright: Lee-Anne Poole, Splinters
- Robert Merritt Awards Nomination Outstanding Actor in a Leading Role: Michael McPhee, Fat Pig
- Robert Merritt Awards Nomination Outstanding Actor in a Supporting Role: Matthew Lumley, Fat Pig
- Robert Merritt Awards Nomination Outstanding Actress in a Leading Role: Jessica Barry, Fat Pig
- Robert Merritt Awards Nomination Outstanding Actor in a Leading Role: Hugh Thompson, Whale Riding Weather
- Robert Merritt Awards Nomination Outstanding Actor in a Leading Role: Hugo Dann, Whale Riding Weather
- Robert Merritt Awards Nomination Outstanding Actor in a Supporting Role: Ryan Doucette, Whale Riding Weather
- Robert Merritt Awards Nomination Outstanding Original Composition or Score: Jason Michael MacIsaac & Stewart Legere, Pluto's Playthings
- Robert Merritt Awards Nomination Outstanding Sound: Christopher Francis Mitchell, Pluto's Playthings
- Nova Scotia Masterworks Award Nomination: Susan Leblanc, The Debacle
- 24th Atlantic Fringe Festival Best Male Performance Award: Hugo Dann, Whale Riding Weather
- 24th Atlantic Fringe Festival Fringe Hit! Award, Whale Riding Weather
