= Mouthpiece (play) =

- Written by: Norah Sadava; Amy Nostbakken

Premiere
- Date premiered: April 17, 2015
- Place premiered: The Theatre Centre

Mouthpiece is a 2015 Canadian feminist play by Norah Sadava and Amy Nostbakken of Quote Unquote Collective.

== Development ==
Nostbakken and Sadava began working on the play in 2013. The play received dramaturgy from Orian Michaeli and features music composed by Nostbakken.

The script was later published by Coach House Books in Canada with an introduction from Michele Landsberg. It has also been published by Oberon Press in the UK and Mitos Boyut in Turkey. It has been translated into Spanish, French, Romanian, Albanian and Turkish.

== Plot ==
Mouthpiece is a two-person play in which both actors play the same character, Cassandra. Cassandra is a writer who finds out her mother has just died and must deal with preparations for the funeral. She must write the eulogy but finds she has lost the ability to speak. The play takes place in a span of twenty-four hours and is set in present-day Toronto.

== Performance history ==
Mouthpiece premiered in 2015 at The Theatre Centre in Toronto starring Sadava and Nostbakken and directed by Nostbakken. In 2016, the production was staged by Nightwood Theatre as part of a double bill. In 2017, Jodie Foster brought Quote Unquote to Los Angeles to performa a two show run of Mouthpiece. Foster first saw the play in Toronto. Also in 2017, they performed the play at the Edinburgh Fringe Festival. In 2018, 2b Theatre brought Quote Unquote Collective and Mouthpiece to Nova Scotia. It was performed at Alderney Landing in Dartmouth. Sadava said that this performance would be the last time she and Nostbakken would perform the play in Canada.

== Awards ==
Year	Award	Category	Result	Notes	Ref.
2015	Dora Mavor Moore Awards - Independent Theatre	Outstanding Performance by an Ensemble	Won		
2015	Dora Mavor Moore Awards - Independent Theatre	Outstanding Sound Design/Composition	Won	for composer Amy Nostbakken and sound designer James Bunton	
2015	Dora Mavor Moore Awards - Independent Theatre	Outstanding Production	Nominated		
2015	Dora Mavor Moore Awards - Independent Theatre	Outstanding New Play	Nominated		
2015	Dora Mavor Moore Awards - Independent Theatre	Outstanding Direction	Nominated	for Amy Nostbakken	
2015	Dora Mavor Moore Awards - Independent Theatre	Outstanding Lighting Design	Nominated	for lighting designer Andre Du Toit	
2016	Capital Critics Circle Award (Ottawa)	Best Professional Production	Nominated		
2016	My Entertainment Awards	Outstanding Production	Nominated		
2016	My Entertainment Awards	Outstanding Actress	Nominated		
2016	My Entertainment Awards	Outstanding Lighting & Sound composition & Design	Nominated	for Andre Du Toit, Amy Nostbakken and James Bunton	
2017	Toronto Theatre Critics Awards	Best New Canadian Play	Won		
2017	Dora Mavor Moore Awards - General	Outstanding Production	Nominated		
2017	Dora Mavor Moore Awards - General	Outstanding Performance - Ensemble	Nominated		
2017	Dora Mavor Moore Awards - General	Outstanding Sound Design/Composition	Won	for composer Amy Nostbakken and sound designer James Bunton	
2017	Carol Tambor Best of Edinburgh Award	n/a	Nominated		
2017	Summerhall Jawbone Award (Edinburgh Fringe)	n/a	Won		
2017	The Stage Awards	Performance at the Edinburgh Fringe Festival	Won		
2019	Merritt Awards	Outstanding Presentation	Won		

== Adaptation ==
In 2018, Mouthpiece was adapted into a film starring Sadava and Nostbakken and directed by Patricia Rozema. In 2025 the Spanish translation and adaptation was staged in Mexico City at Foro Lucerna and Sala Xavier Villaurrutia, produced by El Ingenio Del Caldero.
