= Shauntay Grant =

Canadian poet and author

- Born: Halifax, Nova Scotia
- Occupations: Writer, professor
- Writing career
- Genres: Poetry, Children's Novel, Playwriting, Spoken Word
- Notable works: Africville; Up Home
- Website: shauntaygrant.com

Shauntay Grant is a Canadian author, poet, playwright, and professor. Between 2009 and 2011, she served as the third poet laureate of Halifax, Nova Scotia. She is known for writing Africville, a children's picture book about a black community by the same name that was razed by the city of Halifax in the 1960s. "Africville" was nominated for a 2018 Governor General’s Literary Award. The book also won the 2019 Marilyn Baillie Picture Book Award, and was among 13 picture books listed on the United States Board on Books for Young People's 2019 USBBY Outstanding International Books List.

== Early life and education ==
Grant was born in Halifax, Nova Scotia. She has a Master of Fine Arts degree from The University of British Columbia, a bachelor of music degree from Dalhousie University and a bachelor of journalism degree from the University of King's College.

== Career ==
Grant began publishing her work after she was approached by Sandra McIntyre, a senior editor at Nimbus Publishing, during an event where she read a poem from her teenage years. The poem, called "Remember Preston", talked about her childhood experiences in North Preston, and on McIntyre's suggestion, was turned into a children's book, released in 2008 by the name of Up Home. Similarly, her following two books, The City Speaks In Drums (2010) and Apples and Butterflies (2012), were based on poems written by Grant.

While serving as Halifax's Poet Laureate, Grant organized the first national gathering of Canadian Poets Laureate, which happened in 2010.

In 2019, Grant's play, The Bridge, premiered at Neptune Theatre in Halifax as a co-production between Neptune and 2b Theatre, in association with Obsidian Theatre. She developed the play over several years and workshopped it with Eastern Front Theatre and Black Theatre Workshop. The Bridge tells the story of two estranged brothers in a rural Nova Scotian Black community. Grant won Outstanding New Play by a Nova Scotian at the 2020 Merritt Awards for The Bridge, which was also nominated for Outstanding Production. In 2020, her board book for children, My Hair is Beautiful, was selected as one of the Best of the Year by School Library Journal blogger Betsy Bird in her Fuse 8 Production review of children's books.

Grant is a former host of CBC Radio's national Poetry Face-Off and regional concert music program All The Best. She currently works as an associate professor for Dalhousie University, where she teaches creative writing.

== Awards and honours ==
- Established Artist Award, Arts Nova Scotia. (2020)
- Outstanding New Play, Robert Merritt Awards. (2020)
- Marilyn Baillie Picture Book Award, Canadian Children's Book Awards. (2019)
- Governor General's Literary Awards, finalist Young People's Literature - Illustrated Books. (2019)
- Ruth and Sylvia Schwartz Children's Book Awards finalist. (2019)
- Nova Scotia Masterworks Arts Awards finalist. (2019)
- Joseph S. Stauffer Prize in Writing and Publishing, Canada Council for the Arts. (2015)
- Ann Connor Brimer Award for Children's Literature finalist, Atlantic Book Awards. (2011)
- Jury Award for Outstanding Drama, Atlantic Fringe Fesetival. (2011)
- Poet of Honour, Canadian Festival of Spoken Word. (2010)
- Hackmatack Children's Choice Book Award finalist. (2010)
- Best Atlantic Published Book Award, Atlantic Book Awards. (2009)

== Publications ==
=== Children's books ===
- Grant, Shauntay (2008). Up home. Halifax, NS: Nimbus. ISBN 9781551096605.
- Grant, Shauntay (2010). The city speaks in drums. Halifax, N.S.: Nimbus Publishing. p. 32. ISBN 978-1551097589.
- Grant, Shauntay (2012). Apples and butterflies. Halifax, NS: Nimbus Publishing Limited. ISBN 9781551099354.
- Grant, Shauntay (2017). The walking bathroom. Halifax, Nova Scotia: Nimbus Publishing. p. 32. ISBN 978-1771085564.
- Grant, Shauntay (2018). Africville. Toronto: Groundwood Books. p. 32. ISBN 978-1773060439.
- Grant, Shauntay (2020). My hair is beautiful. Halifax, Nova Scotia: Nimbus Publishing Limited. ISBN 978-1771087667.

=== Plays ===
- The Bridge Toronto: Playwrights Canada Press. (2021)

=== Spoken word ===
- The City Speaks In Drums. Halifax: Wordrhythm, 2010.
- Say Sumthin. Halifax: Wordrhythm, 2014.
