= Irondale Center =

The Irondale Center for Theater, Education, and Outreach
- Address: 85 South Oxford Street; Brooklyn, NY
- Operator: Irondale Ensemble Project
- Capacity: 250 (est.)
- Type: Off-off-Broadway

Construction
- Opened: 2008

Website
- www.irondale.org/about-the-center.html

The Irondale Center for Theater, Education, and Outreach is a performance space in Brooklyn, New York. It was established in 2008 by the Irondale Ensemble Project in a space that had previously housed Sunday school classes for the Layfayette Church.
