= Robert Merritt =

Canadian playwright and film critic

- Born: Robert Gray Merritt; 1936; Yonkers, NY
- Died: June 5, 1999 (aged 62–63)
- Known for: Namesake of Robert Merritt Awards

Robert Gray Merritt (1936 – June 5, 1999) was a Nova Scotia playwright, film critic, and educator.

== Personal life ==
Merritt was born in Yonkers, NY, the son of John Gray and Mildred (Rust) Merritt.

Merritt died in 1999 of complications arising from congestive heart failure and cancer, five years after taking early retirement.

== Career ==
Merritt was a teacher in Houston and Oklahoma in the 1960s. From the 1970s through the 1990s, he was a professor of theatre, specializing in playwriting and film, at Dalhousie University's Department of Theatre. He was well known for challenging the conventions of mainstream theatre and encouraging his many students to find their own artistic voices.

Merritt was also a film critic for CBC Radio's morning program, Information Morning. At times he roused strong listener reaction with his attacks on mainstream movies and his promotion of independent film. Describing Warren Beatty and Dustin Hoffman's Ishtar, Merritt said that it was a pity that the film was not named "Tishtar." because then "if you spelled it backwards, it would almost write its own review."

== Legacy ==
The annual Robert Merritt Awards, which recognize outstanding achievement in professional theatre in Nova Scotia, are named in his honour. The Merritts celebrate accomplishment in acting, directing, playwrighting, design, technical theatre, and production.
