= Réjean Cournoyer =

Canadian actor and singer

Réjean J. Cournoyer
- Born: December 5, 1971 (age 54); Halifax, Nova Scotia, Canada
- Occupations: Actor, singer
- Years active: 1995-present

Réjean Cournoyer (born December 5, 1971) is a Canadian actor and singer, and was raised in a bilingual home. Growing up his family was members of the Church of Jesus Christ of Latter-day Saints.

After graduating from Mount Saint Vincent University with a degree in public relations, and leaving The Church of Jesus Christ of Latter-day Saints, he began working at the Charlottetown Festival, then made his way to Toronto in 1995 to pursue his acting career. He had a recurring role in the short-lived situation comedy Rideau Hall on the Canadian Broadcasting Corporation in 2001, was awarded an ACTRA Award for his role in Thom Fitzgerald's feature film The Event in 2003, and was nominated for a Dora Mavor Moore Award in Toronto in 2004 for originating the role of Joseph Beausoleil in the musical epic Pélagie.

He has been nominated for the Robert Merritt Awards Award for Outstanding Actor four times: 2003 for Private Views, 2005 for Portia White, First You Dream, 2007 for God's Middle Name, and 2008 for Beauty and the Beast.

After releasing a bilingual recording of French Art songs and Jazz standards in 2007, Cournoyer left his home in Halifax, after accepting an invitation from the Canadian Stage Company in Toronto. He has starred in Les Misérables at the Arts Club Theatre Company (Jessie Award nomination), is well known for his turn as Sweeney Todd in The Demon Barber of Fleet Street (Elizabeth Sterling Haynes Award Nomination), and as Mr. Darcy in Pride and Prejudice at the Citadel Theatre in Edmonton, Alberta.

He played "The Beast" in Beauty and the Beast at Theatre Calgary and the Citadel Theatre, and played "Gaston" in the Neptune Theatre production.
