= Portia White: First You Dream =

Two-act musical play written by Lance Woolaver

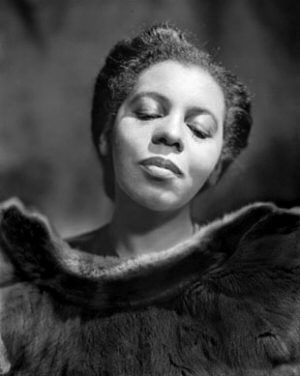
- Portrait of White, taken ca. 1945 by Yousuf Karsh.
- Written by: Lance Woolaver
- Characters: Portia White; Reverend Andrew White; Izie White; Ernesto Vinci
- Original language: English
- Genre: Musical, History

Premiere
- Date premiered: February 19, 2004
- Place premiered: Eastern Front Theatre, Halifax, Nova Scotia

Portia White: First You Dream is a two-act musical play written by Lance Woolaver. It is based on the life of singer Portia White. Born in Truro, Nova Scotia, Canada, in 1911, and part of a large family, White sang in the choir at her father's church as a child, won several singing competitions, and in 1944 began touring Canada, the United States, Central and South America, and the Caribbean. The music consists of spiritual and classical pieces, all in the public domain.

The play was first performed in workshop in Halifax 2003, and has since been performed in Halifax, Nova Scotia, Prince George, British Columbia, and Petrolia, Ontario. It was a huge hit when premiered, and the performance was acknowledged in the Canadian House of Commons as supporting Black History Month.

== Synopsis ==
The first Act begins on a late evening at the White home. Portia's mother, Izie, greets the audience, then reflects on the plight of lonely old ladies, mentions how she misses Portia, and contemplates memories. The story then flashes back several years, to Portia practicing for a music competition while her father attempts to time a sermon for a radio broadcast. For the remainder of the play, Izie sometimes narrates, and sometimes participates in, scenes from the past.

Portia wins the competition, and impresses eccentric music instructor Ernesto Vinci. She becomes his student, and while both are strong-willed individuals that occasionally clash, they also become fond of each other, and he quietly gives her a ring. Portia becomes a popular singer for church fundraisers, telling her father "We put a roof on every church in the county." When Ernesto arranges a debut at Toronto's Massey Hall, Portia insists he come with her. Her parents are concerned about her leaving home, but she leaves with their blessing.

Act Two begins with Portia's debut performance, consisting of three songs (What is Life Without Thee, O Holy Night, and Think on Me). Ernesto does not accompany her. There are glimpses of life on the road during the 1940s, sometimes tiring and challenging. Ernesto and Portia occasionally meet, and he eventually confesses he is a Polish-German Jew, with a painful past, though Portia suspected this. He does not want association with him to hold her back, tells her to go, and she returns his ring. In several scenes, often set over Christmas and spanning several years, Portia's parents reflect on their lives, a child that died young, Portia's generosity, and her apparent loneliness. Her father dies, and Portia resists her mother's suggestion to see Ernesto. She does eventually return to him. Touring and illness is taking its toll, and Portia wants his assistance to become a voice teacher. She takes back his ring, and they regret that they can never be together in public. Izie regrets that Portia has never found anyone. When Portia dies, Ernesto attends her grave, and sings from Proverbs 31 (Eshet Ḥayil) The entire company then sing Think On Me, with portions shared between various pairs of characters.

Throughout the play, there are references to contemporary and past racism. There are musical performances in many scenes, and the total running time is two hours and ten minutes. This can vary depending on the length of songs included, and the author permits cuts to the text. There are references to three siblings that may be represented by performers, and a minor character has a few lines in one scene.

== Roles ==
Character/Credit	Eastern Front Theatre	Theatre North West	Victoria Playhouse
Portia White	Denise Williams	Denise Williams	Amber Tomlin
Reverend Andrew White	Jeremiah Sparks	Tom Pickett	Neville Edwards
Izie White	Sandi Ross	Candus Churchill	Michelle E White
Ernesto Vinci	Rejean Cournoyer	Yanik Giroux	Roberto Longo
Director	Linda Moore	Ted Price	David Hogan
Musical Director	Sandy Moore	Broek Bosma	Mark Payne

== History ==
=== Background and development ===
Lance Woolaver wrote the play after seven years of research into the life of Portia White, including meeting Portia's siblings Lorne White and Yvonne White. Under the title Think on Me: The Portia White Story, the play was given a public workshop performance, with songs, but without full sets, lighting, or props, in 2003. Portia was portrayed by Denise Williams, who also met with Lorne and Yvonne, and learned the spiritual One More River to Cross, from Yvonne. Yvonne served as the musical director for the workshop and performance. Other performers included Jackie Richardson, Richard Donat, and Amber Godfree, and Linda Moore directed. Lorne White, Portia's brother, played her father. Tom Vinci, son of Ernesto Vinci, has also contributed to the play.

After this performance, the title changed to Portia White: Think on Me. There was a full production the following year, under the current title. Lance Woolaver, with the assistance of Tom Vinci, is currently developing the play as a feature film.

=== Productions ===
Eastern Front Theatre Company, of Halifax, premiered the play on February 19, 2004, for ten nights. Singer Denise Williams reprised her role as Portia, and Linda Moore directed again. Portia's brother and sister Lorne and Yvonne attended, as well as Tom Vince, son of Ernesto Vinci. Another attendee was the President of the Halifax Ladies Musical Club, an organization which helped launch Portia's career. A major snowstorm, known as White Juan, led to the cancellation of several performances. Theatre North West, of Prince George, presented the play from November 16 to December 4, 2005. Again, Denise Williams played Portia. Victoria Playhouse, of Petrolia, presented the play from August 15 to 27, under the title Portia. In addition to the four main characters, the show featured singers Brian Belleth (tenor), Ruaridh MacDonald (baritone), Rebecca McCauley (soprano) and Aijia Waithe (contralto).

== Reception ==
=== Critical reception ===
Performers, often with a strong singing background, have praised the play for bringing attention to an early performer, and noted that audience members often want to know more about her. Sister Yvonne White has also praised the play. Michelle White, who played Izie for the Petrolia production, determined that she was not related to Portia, but discovered her voice teacher had been trained by Ernesto Vinci, and that Ernesto's lines in the play were similar to things her voice teacher would say. The Eastern Front performance was acknowledged in the Canadian House of Commons as supporting Black History Month.

The Eastern Front production garnered Robert Merritt Awards nominations for Réjean Cournoyer (Outstanding Actor) and Sandy Moore (Outstanding Sound or Original Score).

The Prince George production earned praise for all four actors, and noted that the play both tells a story and allows for great performances.

=== Box office ===
In 2004, the artistic director of The Eastern Front Theatre identified this play as "the most successful box office production that we have ever done," despite a storm that closed the theatre for three nights. It is still listed as a hit in the company history, and the $39,000 revenue it earned was credited with saving the theatre company.
