= MV Kipawo =

Coordinates: 45°24′02.5″N 64°19′42.5″W

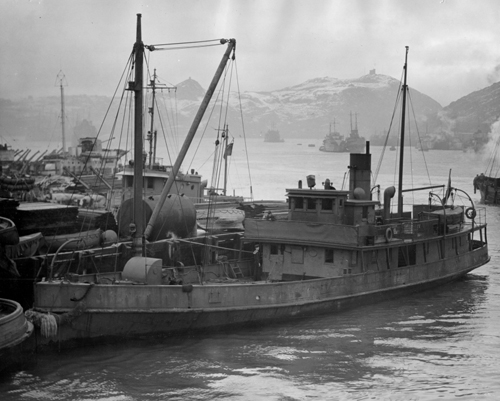
- MV Kipawo, then known as BD 8, during Royal Canadian Navy service in World War II

History

Canada
- Name: Kipawo
- Owner: Dominion Atlantic Railway
- Builder: St. John Drydock & Shipbuilding Co.
- Launched: December 5, 1925
- Status: Permanently drydocked Parrsboro, Nova Scotia

General characteristics
- Tonnage: 200 GRT
- Length: 123 ft (37 m)
- Beam: 26 ft (7.9 m)
- Depth: 9 ft (2.7 m)
- Propulsion: Fairbanks-Morse oil engine

MV Kipawo is a historic Canadian passenger and freight ferry in operation from 1926 to 1978, first in Nova Scotia and later in Newfoundland. The ship also served as a naval auxiliary vessel in the Second World War and as a tour boat at the end of her career before her hull was acquired and preserved in 1982 to provide a base for the Ship's Company Theatre in Parrsboro, Nova Scotia.

== Construction ==
Kipawo was launched on December 5, 1925, by the St. John Drydock & Shipbuilding Co., the first ship ever built by that yard. Kipawo was ordered for the Dominion Atlantic Railway, commissioned into service for the railway on April 1, 1926 and made her first scheduled voyage across the Minas Basin on May 1, 1926.The vessel's name is a portmanteau of the first 2 letters from three different ports on the Minas Basin: Kingsport, Parrsboro and Wolfville.

== Bay of Fundy service ==
Kipawo provided passenger and freight service from the spring to the fall across the Minas Basin, the 33rd and last ferry to provide service across Minas Passage, a regular travel route since the Acadian era. Her sailings were scheduled to connect with Dominion Atlantic passenger trains at Wolfville and Kingsport as tides permitted. The ferry used an innovative sling system to load automobiles.

== Newfoundland service ==
During World War II Kipawo was requisitioned by the Royal Canadian Navy and saw service in Conception Bay, Newfoundland as BD-8, a tender for anti-submarine nets off the iron ore loading piers at Bell Island.

During the post-war years until retirement in 1977, Kipawo saw service as a small passenger and vehicle ferry from Bell Island to Portugal Cove, ending 51 years of service, approximately 45 of those as a ferry and currently the second-longest continuous service as a ferry in Canada (SS Prince Edward Island having operated from 1915 to 1969).

Following retirement from ferry service in Newfoundland, Kipawo saw service as a private tour boat in the waters off Terra Nova National Park for several years. While en route to St. John's one day in the late 1970s, she sought shelter in Bonavista Bay from a storm but ran aground and remained there deteriorating for several years.

== Theatre use ==
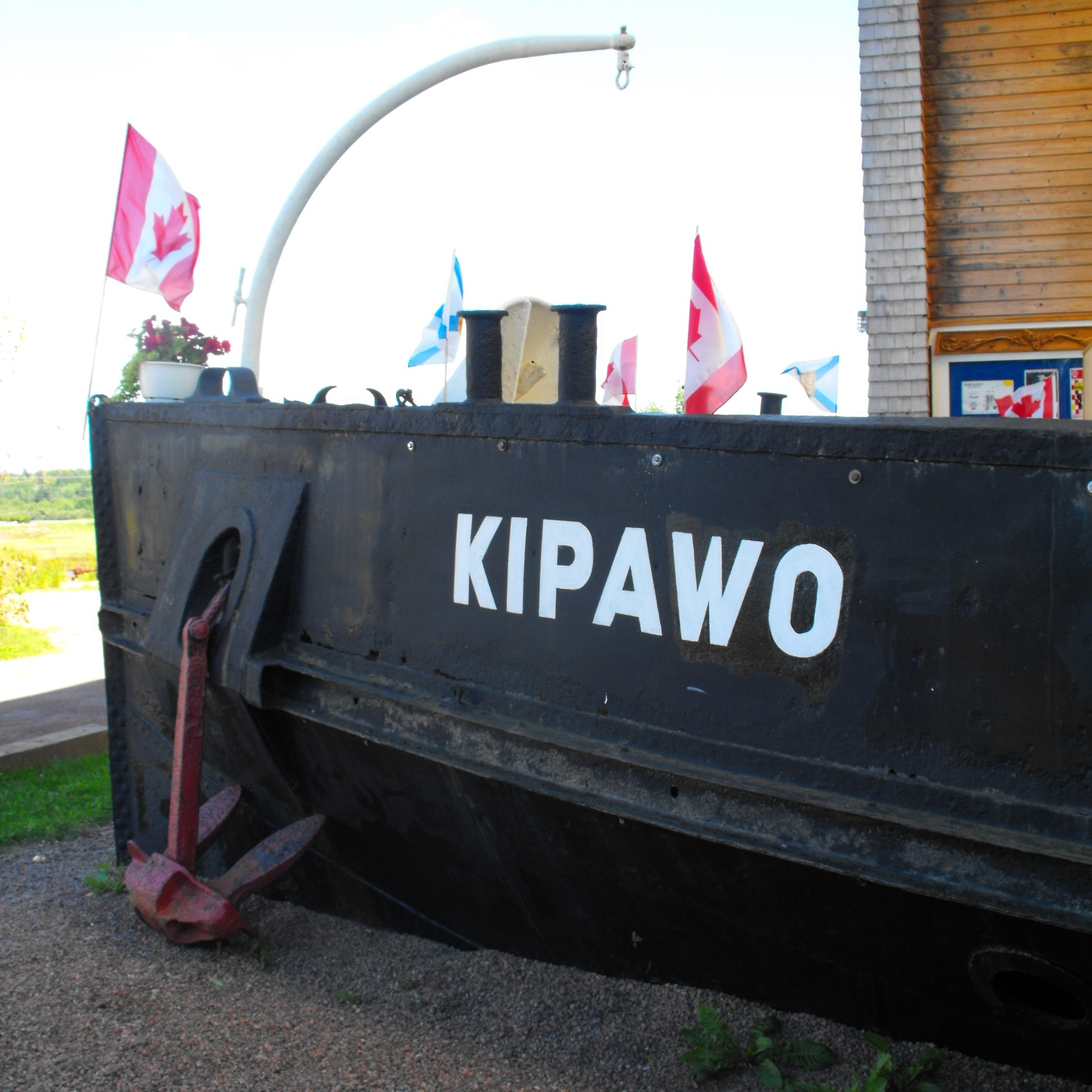
The bow of Kipawo at the Ship's Company Theatre

The vessel was purchased in 1981 by the Kipawo Heritage Society of Wolfville and was returned to Minas Basin in 1982. Not long after returning to the Minas Basin, Kipawo was purchased by the Town of Parrsboro, Nova Scotia for a museum and was deliberately beached in a tidal inlet immediately south of the town while funding arrangements were secured. By 1986 the museum concept was shelved in favour of housing a local theatre, the Ship's Company Theatre, which began to use the Kipawo as their performance centre. In 2004, the theatre company expanded its facilities with an expanded performance hall which architecturally incorporates the Kipawo into the outdoor lobby.
