= Ryan Doucette =

Canadian actor and comedian

- Born: Ryan Vernon Doucette; 23 July 1983 (age 42); Nova Scotia, Canada
- Occupations: Actor; comedian; writer; director
- Years active: 2008–present

Ryan Doucette (born Ryan Vernon Doucette; 23 July 1983) is a Canadian actor, comedian, scriptwriter and director of Acadian descent. He is best known for his roles in the films Cloudburst and The Disappeared, and the television series Forgive Me.

His work in theatre includes Cloudburst for which he was nominated for a Robert Merritt Award, Whale Riding Weather for which he was nominated for a second Robert Merritt Award, and his one-man show Pourquois pas?. He won the Merritt Award for his performance in His Greatness.

In 2019, he created and starred in the reality television series Le sens du punch on Unis TV and subsequently toured his comedy show Punch moi. He then went on to write and direct the second and third season of this television series.

== Biography ==
=== Early life ===
He was raised in Clare, Nova Scotia, Canada. He obtained a B.A. in theatre at Université Sainte-Anne in Church Point, Nova Scotia.

=== Career ===
Doucette began his career with the theatre troupe "Les Araignées du Boui-Boui" and by presenting mime sketches at the Café Bric-à-Brac at Université Sainte-Anne. These sketches formed the foundation for his first solo mime show Ryan Doucette: Première ronde (First Round) touring Canada, the United States and France.

His English theatre debut was in Vimy at Eastern Front Theatre in 2008. He met with some acclaim for his performance in the original stage production of Thom Fitzgerald's Cloudburst in his native Nova Scotia, and was subsequently cast in the film version starring opposite Academy Award winners Olympia Dukakis and Brenda Fricker. He subsequently starred in The Disappeared and in Ron Maxwell's Copperhead. He appeared on stage again in Whale Riding Weather and His Greatness and had a recurring role on Forgive Me.

== Filmography ==
Feature films
| Year | Film | Role | Notes |
|---|---|---|---|
| 2008 | Nonsense Revolution | Cool guy who does dishes | |
| 2011 | Cloudburst | Prentice | |
| 2011 | Charlie Zone | Jean Guy | |
| 2012 | The Disappeared | Gib | |
| 2013 | Roaming | Neil | |
| 2013 | There's Been a Terrible Mistake (short) | Paul | |
| 2013 | Copperhead | Byron Truax | |

Television
| Year | Title | Role | Notes |
|---|---|---|---|
| 2012 | Ryan Doucette: Premiere ronde | various | CBC |
| 2013–2018 | Forgive Me | Sebastian | Super Channel |
| 2017 | Sex & Violence | Harry | OUTtv |
| 2019 | Conséquences | Maxime Doiron | ICI ARTV |
| 2019 | Le sens du punch | Himself | Unis TV |
| 2020 | Les Newbies | Réjean Picard | Unis TV |

== Awards and nominations ==
- Nominated: Robert Merritt Award, Theatre Nova Scotia, Best Supporting Actor (2013), Whale Riding Weather
- Nominated: Robert Merritt Award, Theatre Nova Scotia, Best Supporting Actor (2011), Cloudburst
- Robert Merritt Award, Theatre Nova Scotia, Best Supporting Actor (2011), His Greatness
- Prix Grand-Pré, Arts Nova Scotia and the Creative Nova Scotia Leadership Council (2020)
