= Ship's Company Theatre =

Theatre company in Nova Scotia, Canada

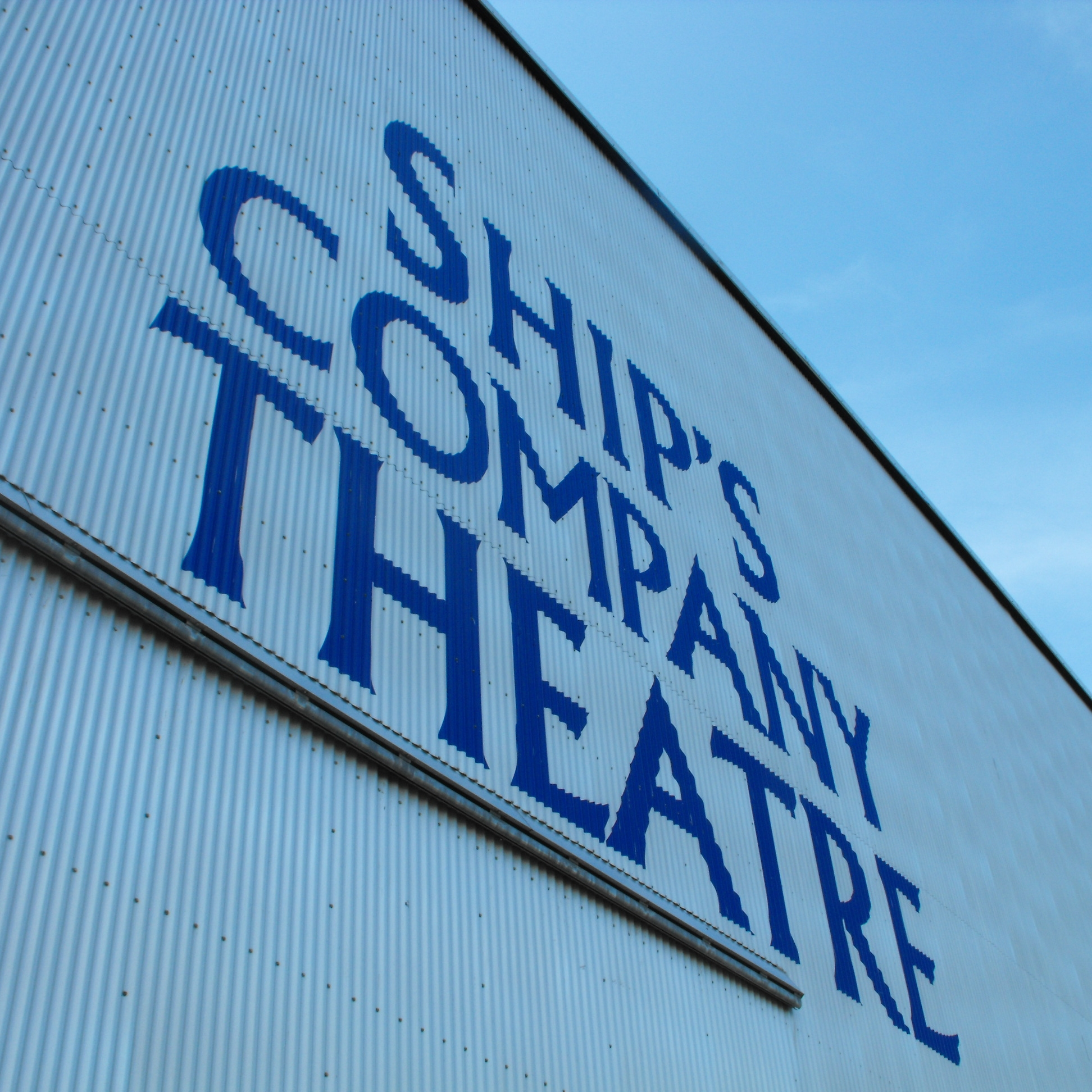
Ship's Company Theatre

The Ship's Company Theatre is a professional theatre company based in Parrsboro, Nova Scotia.

Founded in 1984 by Michael Fuller and Mary Vingoe, the Ship's Company Theatre features productions of Canadian works, with an emphasis on new works from Maritime writers. It often commissions its own productions, and a number have been remounted in other theatres across Canada.

The theatre's 14-week production season runs from July to October and features two mainstage plays; a second stage for "new and emerging artists" from Atlantic Canada; a music series including tribute shows, as well as a kid's stage. The box office is located at 18 Lower Main Street, Parrsboro.

The theatre's current artistic director is Laura Vingoe-Cram.

== Name ==
The name "Ship's Company" is in reference to the theatre's first (and continuing) home in Parrsboro on board the MV Kipawo, one of Canada's longest-serving ferries, which is now permanently beached on the western shore of Parrsboro Harbour. The theatre company made use of the ship after a museum proposal fell through in the mid-1980s. A 2004 expansion of the theatre's facilities saw a large performance hall built with the MV Kipawo being fully enclosed in the outdoor lobby.
