= This Is How It Goes =

Play by Neil LaBute, premiered 2005

- Original language: English
- Written by: Neil LaBute
- Characters: Cody; Belinda; Man
- Subject: Race and Infidelity
- Genre: Drama
- Setting: American Midwest

Premiere
- Date: March 27, 2005
- Place: United States

This Is How It Goes is a play by Neil LaBute set in small town America, about the repercussions of an interracial love triangle. The play premiered Off-Broadway in 2005 and also was produced in the West End in 2005.

== Plot and concept ==
High school sweethearts — the star of the high school track team (Cody) and a cheerleader (Belinda) — marry. He becomes a successful businessman; she's a stay-at-home mom. A high school acquaintance (Man) returns to town and rents the room over their garage and upsets the delicate balance of their relationship, raising questions about who they want to be, who they are, and what made them that way.

The play's title refers to Man's frequent breaking of drama's Fourth Wall as he addresses the audience in between scenes. He prefaces his remarks to set up the next scene with "This is how it goes..." or his remarks on the preceding action with "This is how it went...". Deeply in love with Belinda, or at least the Belinda he remembered, he professes to being an unreliable narrator. Occasional scenes may not have occurred as he relates them at first and get re-acted in a style that the audience might find more reasonable or plausible.

== Productions ==
This Is How It Goes premiered Off-Broadway at The Public Theater on March 11, 2005, in previews, and opened officially on March 27, 2005. Directed by George C. Wolfe, the cast starred Amanda Peet as Belinda, Jeffrey Wright as Cody, and Ben Stiller as Man. Marisa Tomei was originally cast as Belinda but left the production before it began, citing "personal family reasons". The production ran through April 24, 2005.

The play opened in the West End at the Donmar Warehouse on 14 July 2005 and ran through 3 September 2005. Directed by Moises Kaufman, the production starred Ben Chaplin as Man, Megan Dodds as Belinda, and Idris Elba as Cody.

In Germany it opened at the English Theatre of Hamburg on 6 September 2010 with Julie Addy as Belinda, Ike Ononye as Cody and Sean Browne as Man.

The play was produced at the King's Head Theatre in Islington, London, from September 7 to October 3, 2010, starring Gemma Atkinson as Belinda, Okezie Morro as Cody and Tom Greaves as 'Man'.
