= Festival Antigonish Summer Theatre =

Coordinates: 45.618331°N 61.996081°W

Festival Antigonish Summer Theatre is an annual independent regional Summer theatre that operates each year from July through September, in the town of Antigonish, Nova Scotia. Founded in 1987, FAST presented a summer-long repertory season with a range of productions which appeal to all age groups. During the COVID-19 Pandemic, they pivoted to large -scale outdoor productions, mixing community performers with professional actors. Since 2023, they have returned to indoor stage productions, but have not resumed the repertory style. Performances are held in the Bauer Theatre building on the St. Francis Xavier University campus.
