= Irondale Ensemble Project =

Experimental theatre company

Irondale Ensemble is an experimental theatre company founded in New York City in 1983 by Jim Niesen, Terry Greiss and Barbara Mackenzie-Wood. Since then, they have produced more than forty-five major Off Broadway shows and mounted two international and three domestic tours. In October 2008 Irondale opened The Irondale Center to the public. A place for experimentation, thought provoking original works, reinterpretations of classic works, vital community events, and a home to ensemble works of all disciplines, the Center has hosted/presented over 100 events in the last two years including 5 pieces by the Ensemble itself. Brooklyn New York, the Irondale Ensemble Project descends from the ensemble movement in American theatre. This movement came out of the Great Depression and developed throughout the age of progressive politics during the 1960s. Irondale Ensemble Project creates theatre that is a voice for social change and has performed in schools, prisons, shelters, and other community settings. Central to their work is the exploration of collaboration, creativity, pedagogy and the process of theatre-making through the long association of theatre artists working as an ensemble. Irondale is a member of the Theatre Communications Group, the Network of Ensemble Theatres and ART New York. It is funded by the National Endowment for the Arts, the New York State Council on the Arts, and the New York City Department of Cultural Affairs.

== History ==
The Irondale Ensemble Project was founded in 1983, by Jim Niesen, Terry Greiss and Barbara Mackenzie-Wood as an experimental/research theater to further investigate the performance and education techniques that they had developed at the Long Wharf Theatre in the late 1970s. It exists today as a company dedicated to the exploring the emerging themes in our society with a permanent ensemble of artists that has developed a distinctive body of work and practices. In 2008, the company moved into the BAM Cultural District in the landmarked Fort Greene area of Brooklyn.

Irondale is a founding member of the Network of Ensemble Theaters, a national consortium of artist-driven performance companies. Between 2000 and 2008, Irondale was the administrative “lead company” of the NET.

The majority of the company’s work follows two closely related performance styles: the presentation of established texts in unorthodox and often irreverent productions; and the creation of new theater works, often by combining original material with a classic and blending multiple styles of performance, music, dance, design, historical research text. The company has also created significant documentary theater works including “A People’s History of Fort Greene” and “911:Voices Unheard”. In addition to developing and performing its own theatrical pieces, Irondale has conducted extensive programs of educational and community engagement programs. The combination of daily rehearsal and performance work, in conjunction with the para-theatrical use of Irondale techniques as a means of educating and addressing social issues, has done much to shape the politics of Irondale as a company and to determine the nature and direction of its ongoing experiments. The fusion of art and education, to the extent that no separation exists between them, is a considered part of the company’s aesthetic and philosophy. The company’s audience is as diverse as its mission would demand, including students, seniors, a general theater-going public and a broad-based mix of social, educational, ethnic and gender backgrounds. Irondale’s model has been replicated. Irondale, New York has been replicated through the creation of a “sister” ensemble of Canadian theater artists based in Nova Scotia and three NYC based ensembles created by Irondale alumni. They have successfully adapted the model to reach other audiences and accommodate new artistic voices.

== Background and Activities ==
Founded in 1983, the Irondale Ensemble is one of the companies of this kind in the United States.
