= Bryden MacDonald =

Canadian playwright (born 1960)

Bryden MacDonald (born October 30, 1960, in Glace Bay, Nova Scotia) is a Canadian playwright.

His best known plays include Whale Riding Weather, which was a nominated for the Governor General's Award for English drama at the 1994 Governor General's Awards, and With Bated Breath, which was a shortlisted nominee in the Drama category at the 2011 Lambda Literary Awards. His other plays include The Weekend Healer (1994), Divinity Bash / nine lives (1998) and The Extasy of Bedridden Riding Hood (2004). He was nominated again for the Governor General's Award for English drama for Odd Ducks (2015), He has also helmed musical tributes to Leonard Cohen (Sincerely, A Friend, 1991), Carole Pope and Rough Trade (Shaking the Foundations, 1999) and Joni Mitchell (When All the Slaves Are Free, 2003).

MacDonald is also a theatre director, most noted for his productions of Tennessee Williams' Cat on a Hot Tin Roof, Joe Orton's What the Butler Saw and Judith Thompson's Perfect Pie. He has taught at the National Theatre School of Canada, and served as playwright in residence at the Stratford Festival.

He is openly gay.
