= Whale Riding Weather =

Play by Bryden MacDonald

Whale Riding Weather is a play by Canadian playwright Bryden MacDonald. It is written for three male actors.

The characters are Lyle, a bitter aged queen in a downward spiral, Auto, Lyle's younger lover, and Jude, a man younger still that Auto has just met.

== Synopsis ==
A fading old queen finds his life ebbing away from him, as his younger lover also slips away with a new, even younger man.

== Production history ==
The play premiered at Factory Theatre in Toronto in 1991, and has been produced at Neptune Theatre (Halifax), Touchstone Theatre in Vancouver, Plutonium Playhouse in Halifax, and Cape Breton University Boardmore Playhouse in Sydney, Nova Scotia. Talonbooks published the script in 1994. It was nominated for the Governor General's Award for Drama.
