= 2b Theatre Company =

Theatre company based in Halifax, Nova Scotia

2b theatre company, stylized as the 2b theatre company, is a theatre company based in Halifax, Nova Scotia.

== History ==
2b was founded in 1999 by Christian Barry, Anthony Black, Andrea Dymond, Zach Fraser, and Angela Gasparetto. Built from a fledgling student start up, the company has gone on to stage 29 original productions, including 26 world premieres. Its work has been presented in 66 cities, 13 countries, and five continents. 2b has won two Herald Angel Awards, an Edinburgh Fringe First, and has been nominated for six Drama Desk Awards. 2b's shows have been finalists for the Nova Scotia Masterworks Award three times and in 2018, Old Stock: A Refugee Love Story became the first theatrical production to win the award.

Barry remains the theatre's artistic director as of 2025. In 2022, actor and playwright Jacob Sampson joined the company as associate artistic director.

== Mandate ==
"2b theatre company strives to stimulate the mind and awaken the spirit by producing theatre that is innovative and challenging. We create, produce, present, and tour original work nationally and internationally. Our work is part of the evolution of contemporary theatre aesthetics. We are also an incubator, central to a thriving national theatre community, that offers a range of creation, performance, and production opportunities for arts professionals from our region and beyond."

== Touring ==
While based in Halifax, 2b is a touring company. To date, 2b has toured to 40 cities in 10 countries on four continents.

List of cities visited by 2b:

- Aarhus
- Albany, Western Australia
- Antigonish
- Auckland
- Burnaby
- Calgary
- Charleston
- Chester
- Cork
- Cow Head
- Dartmouth
- Denmark
- Edinburgh
- Edmonton
- Fredericton
- Groningen
- Halifax
- Hannover
- Kitchener
- London, Ontario
- Melbourne
- Memphis
- Moncton
- Montreal
- Mumbai
- Nashville
- New York
- North Vancouver
- Ottawa
- Parrsboro
- Pittsburgh
- Regina
- Saint John
- Salt Spring Island
- Stephenville
- Stratford, Ontario
- Sydney
- Toronto
- Vancouver
- Victoria
- Wellington
- Whitehorse
- Windsor

== Recent productions ==
- Unconscious at the Sistine Chapel
- We Are Not Alone
- What a Young Wife Ought to Know
- The God that Comes
- When it Rains

== Awards and nominations ==
Year	Award	Status	Production
2015	The Coast Top Ten		What A Young Wife Ought To Know
2014	Herald Little Devil Award	Winner	The God That Comes
2014	The Nova Scotia Merritt Award: Best New Play	Winner	The God That Comes
2013	Nova Scotia Masterworks Award	Finalist	When it Rains
2013	Betty Mitchell Awards: Outstanding Composition or Sound Design	Winner	The God That Comes
2013	Betty Mitchell Awards: Best Production of a Musical	Winner	The God That Comes
2012	Summerworks Design Award	Winner	When it Rains
2012	The Nova Scotia Merritt Award: Best Supporting Female Actor	Winner	When it Rains
2012	The Nova Scotia Merritt Award: Best Director	Winner	
