= David Sakvarelidze (director) =

Georgian theatre & opera director (born 1970)

David Sakvarelidze (Georgian: სუყო; born 21 March 1970, Tbilisi) is a Georgian theatre and opera director, arts manager and composer.

== Biography ==
Sakvarelidze attended the Shota Rustaveli Theatre and Film University, then studied with Giorgio Strehler and Luca Ronconi in Milan; Peter Brook at the Royal National Theatre Studio in London; at the Tisch School of the Arts in New York and with Jennifer Tipton at Yale University.

Following Georgia's independence, Sakvarelidze became a prominent figure in Georgian theatre. It was then he founded the Caucasian Theatre/Lab to develop new writers in the creative industry.

His work in Georgia attracted international attention with The Times referring to him as "At 28 […] already the godfather of an emerging generation of artists." Such attention led to invitations to work at English National Opera in London; at the New York Theatre Workshop, where he directed James Pinkowski's Mint Juleps as part of his residency, and at Milan's Piccolo Teatro (Milan).

While in Milan he wrote a thesis on the future of theatre and opera in Georgia and the need to implement new working methods that would banish the old Soviet style of management and training. He advocated for the adoption of contemporary practices for culture to be improved in Georgia. This was sent by the Italian Ambassador in Georgia to members of the Georgian government who endorsed his proposals and appointed him General Director of the Georgian National Opera Theater.

In 2017, Sakvarelidze founded the Tsinandali Festival. In his role as General Director he helped found the Pan Caucasian Youth Orchestra, bringing young musicians from across the Caucasian region together. Sakvarelidze also serves as artistic director of the Sokhumi State Drama Theatre, which consists of refugees.

Sakvarelidze is President of the Georgian National Center of the UNESCO International Theatre Institute. His awards include the Georgian Presidential Order of Excellence, awarded in 2011.

== List of productions ==
- 2019 – "The Doll’s House" by Henrik Ibsen – Sokhumi State Drama Theatre;
- 2018 – "The Jesus Case" by Lasha Imedashvili – Sokhumi State Drama Theatre;
- 2017 – "Yakish and Poupche" by Hanoch Levin – Sokhumi State Drama Theatre;
- 2016 – "Naples, Town of Millionaires" by Eduardo De Philippo – Sokhumi State Drama Theatre;
- 2015 – "Angry Birds" by Bassa Janikashvili – Rustaveli State Theatre;
- 2014 – "Lysistrata" by Lasha Bugadze – Rustaveli State Theatre;
- 2014 – "The Navigator" by Lasha Bugadze – Sokhumi State Theatre;
- 2014 – "I’ll Come Back as Rain" based on Niko Gomelauri's poems – Rustaveli National Theatre;
- 2013 – "Rigoletto" by Giuseppe Verdi (with Omer Meyer Wellber) – Tbilisi Concert Hall;
- 2012 – "Madama Butterfly" by Giacomo Puccini – Kutaisi State Opera;
- 2011 – "Lucia Di Lammermoor" by Gaetano Donizetti – Batumi State Art and Musical Center;
- 2011 – "Oliver!" (musical) by Lionel Bart – Rustaveli State Theatre;
- 2011 – "Naphthalene" by Lasha Bugadze – Marjanishvili Theatre;
- 2010 – "Mitridate, re di Ponto" by Wolfgang Amadeus Mozart – Georgian National Opera Theater;
- 2010 – "The Book" by Aka Morchiladze – Marjanishvili State Theatre;
- 2010 – "Carmen" by Georges Bizet – Tbilisi Concert Hall;
- 2010 – "Attila" by Giuseppe Verdi – Tbilisi State Opera and Ballet Theatre;
- 2009 – "Tosca" by Giacomo Puccini – Rustaveli State Theatre and Tbilisi Opera co-production;
- 2008 – "Spiritual Beings" by Lasha Bugadze – Rustaveli State Theatre;
- 2008 – "Rigoletto" by Giuseppe Verdi – Tbilisi State Opera and Ballet Theatre;
- 2008 – "La Traviata" by Giuseppe Verdi – Batumi State Opera;
- 2007 – "Celebrity" by Basa Janikashvili – Marjanishvili State Theatre;
- 2005 – "Aida" by Giuseppe Verdi – Tbilisi State Opera and Ballet Theatre;
- 2004 – "Hip" by Yoke Van Leeuwen – Royal District Theatre;
- 2004 – "The Snakeskin" by Slobodan Šnajder – Azerbaijan State Theatre "Yuğ";
- 2003 – "Tartuffe" by Molière – Tumanishvili Film Actor Theatre;
- 2003 – "Woman on The Tree" by Jarji Akimidze and Davit Turashvili – Royal District Theatre;
- 2002 – "The House on the Border" by Mrojeck – Royal District Theatre;
- 2002 – "This Chair and That Very Bed" by Lasha Bugadze – Royal District Theatre;
- 2001 – "Der Park" by Botho Strauß – Royal District Theatre;
- 1999 – "Doctor Frankenstein" by Lasha Bugadze and David Sakvarelidze – Marjanishvili State Theatre;
- 1998 – "La donna serpente" by Carlo Gozzi – Rustaveli State Theatre;
- 1998 – "Otari" by Lasha Bugadze – Basement Theatre;
- 1997 – "Cavalleria rusticana" by Pietro Mascagni – Tbilisi State Opera and Ballet Theatre;
- 1997 – "Narrow Road to the Deep North" by Edward Bond – Sokhumi State Drama Theatre;
- 1996 – "Agape" by Hanoch Levin – Rustaveli State Theatre;
- 1994 – "The Marriage Contest" by Carlo Goldoni – Russian State Youth Theatre;
