= Fat Pig (opera) =

Opera by Matt Boehler

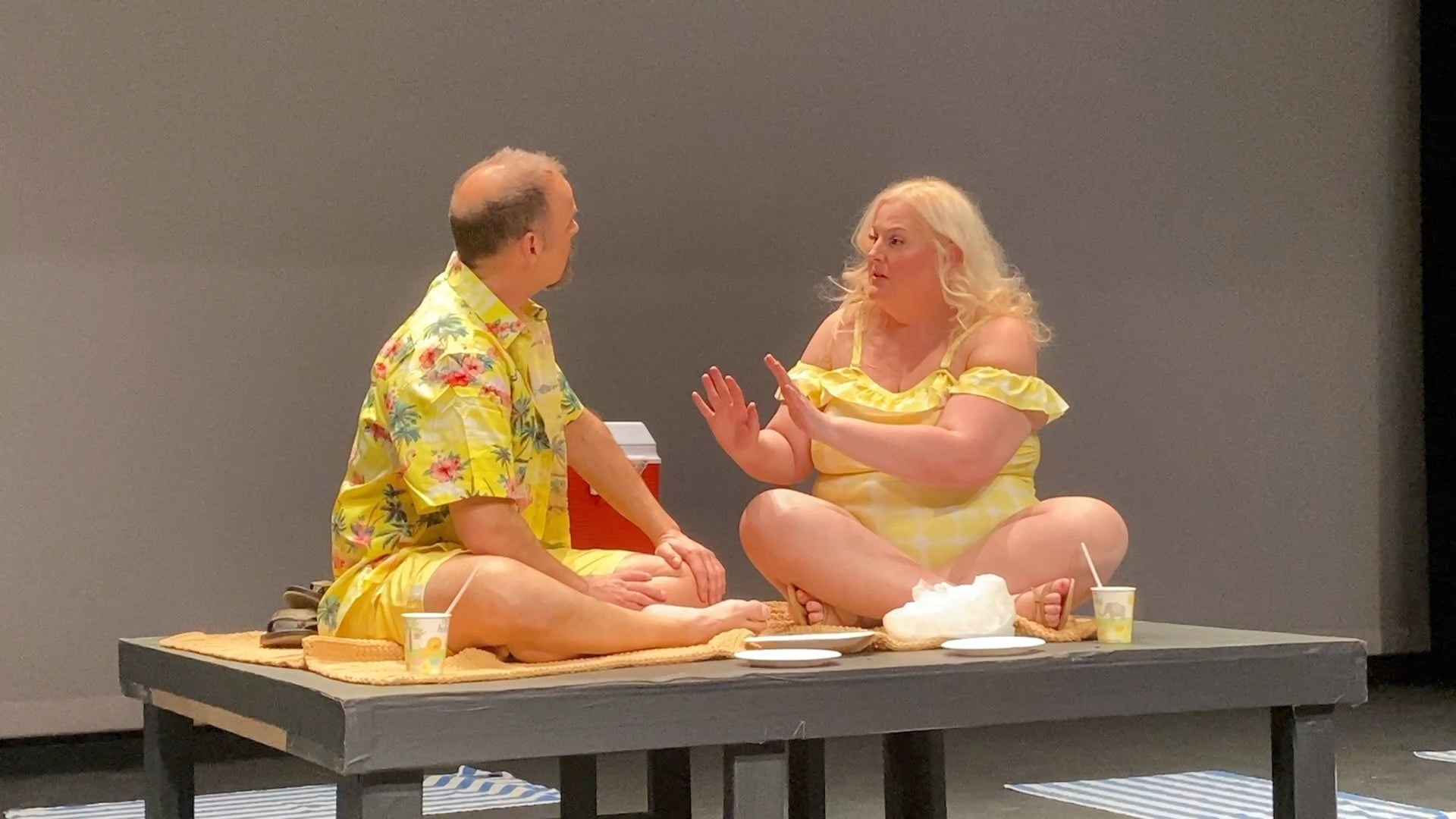
Troy Cook (Tom) & Tracy Cox (Helen) in Fat Pig

Fat Pig is a chamber opera by composer Matt Boehler and librettist Miriam Gordon-Stewart, based on the 2004 play by Neil LaBute. The opera was commissioned and developed by Victory Hall Opera in 2020, and had its world premiere in Charlottesville, Virginia, in January 2022.

The premiere cast featured baritone Troy Cook (Tom), soprano Tracy Cox (Helen), tenor Will Ferguson (Carter) and soprano Sarah Wolfson (Jeannie), was directed by Miriam Gordon-Stewart and conducted by Kathleen Kelly, leading the 6-piece chamber orchestra.

The plot of the 100-minute opera tells the story of a witty, confident fat woman (Helen) and a man in a normative body (Tom) who fall in love, only to have their relationship challenged and eventually ruined by Tom's insecurities, expressed in the taunts and judgment of his coworkers.

Tracy Cox cites Fat Pig as being "the first opera about a fat woman in a romantic lead" to be written. Composer Matt Boehler has stated that "under all the discrimination and outright cruelty...the heart of Fat Pig is a human story and...a love story."
