= La donna serpente (opera) =

La donna serpente (The Snake Woman) is a 1932 opera by Alfredo Casella to a libretto by Cesare Vico Lodovici based on the fable, La donna serpente, by Carlo Gozzi. The same fable was the basis of Wagner's first opera, Die Feen. The plot concerns a king, Altidòr, who falls in love with a fairy, Miranda. The fairy's father curses Altidòr that if he curses Miranda, she shall turn into a snake.

== Recordings ==
- La donna serpente (LP). Mirto Picchi, Magda László, Renata Mattioli, Luisella Ciaffi, Coro di Milano della Rai, Giulio Bertola. Orchestra Sinfonica di Milano della Rai, Fernando Previtali, 1959.
- La donna serpente (DVD). Angelo Villari, Zuzana Marková, Vanessa Goikoetxea, Anta Jankovska, Candida Guida, Orchestra Internazionale d'Italia, Fabio Luisi; Bongiovanni, 2014.
- La donna serpente (DVD). Piero Pretti, Carmela Remigio, Erika Grimaldi, Francesca Sassu, Anna Maria Chiuri, Marco Filippo Romano, Orchestra del Teatro Regio di Torino, Gianandrea Noseda.
