= Die Feen =

Opera by Richard Wagner

- Opera by Richard Wagner
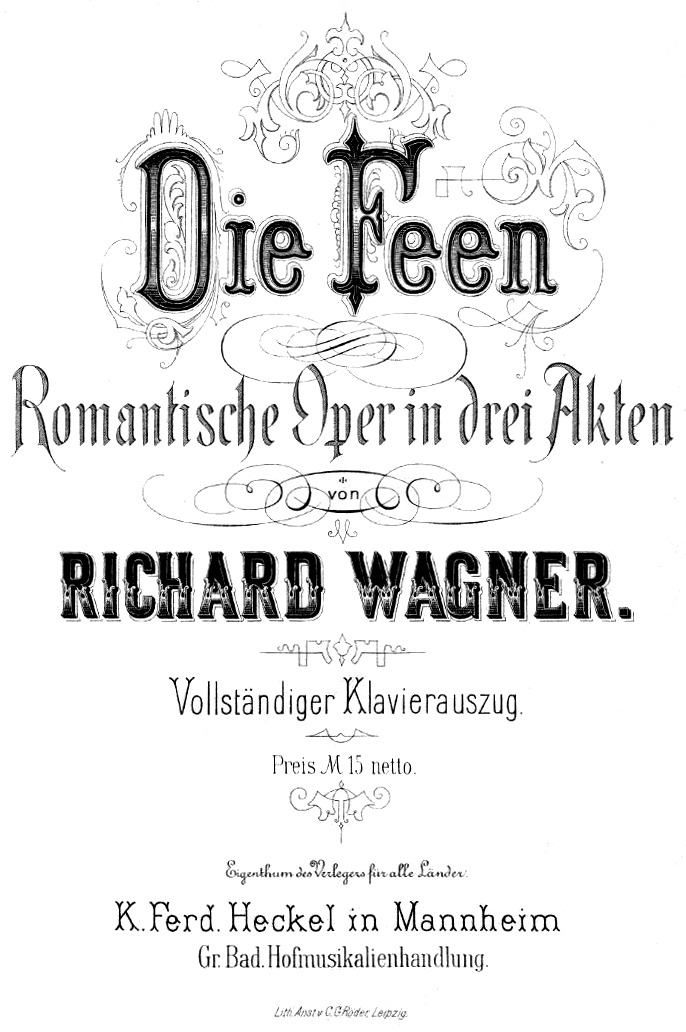
- Title page of the piano reduction
- Translation: The Fairies
- Librettist: Richard Wagner (1833)
- Language: German
- Based on: Carlo Gozzi's La donna serpente
- Premiere: 29 June 1888; Königliches Hof- und National-Theater in Munich

Die Feen (German: [diː feːn], The Fairies) is an opera in three acts by Richard Wagner. The German libretto was written by the composer after Carlo Gozzi's La donna serpente. Die Feen was Wagner's first completed opera, but remained unperformed in his lifetime. It has never established itself firmly in the operatic repertory although it receives occasional performances, on stage or in concert, most often in Germany. The opera is available on CD and in a heavily cut, adapted-for-children version, DVD.

Although the music of Die Feen shows the influences of Carl Maria von Weber and other composers of the time, commentators have recognised embryonic features of the mature Wagnerian opera. The fantasy plot also anticipates themes such as redemption that were to reappear in his later works.

== Background and composition ==
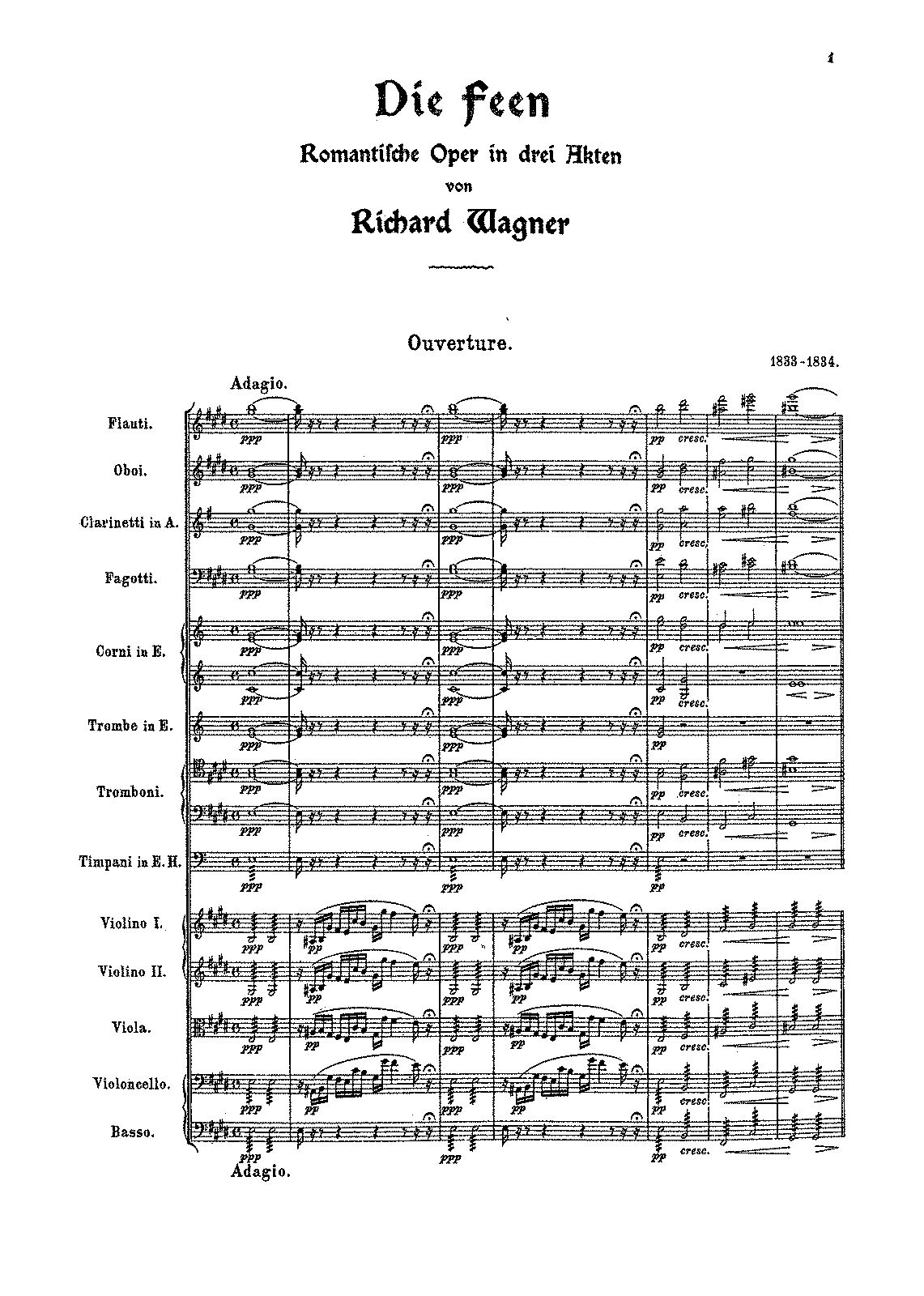
First page

Die Feen was Wagner's first completed opera, composed in 1833, when he was 20 years old and working as a part-time chorus master in Würzburg. He gave it the description of Grosse romantische Oper (grand romantic opera).

The year before he started composition, Wagner had abandoned his first attempt at writing an opera, Die Hochzeit (The Wedding). There were a number of difficulties facing new German-language opera in the 1830s. First there was deemed to be a lack of good quality libretti to set. This may have influenced Wagner's decision to write the libretto for Die Feen himself. Second, there was a fear among the authorities in Germany and Austria that the performance of operas in German would attract nationalist and revolutionary followers. This would have added to the difficulties faced by a novice composer seeking an opportunity for his new opera to be performed.

Although Gozzi's La donna serpente (The Snake Woman) was the source for Wagner's plot, he took the names of Die Feen's two principal characters, Ada and Arindal, from Die Hochzeit. The libretto also introduced a fantastic theme that was not in the original play. The libretto displays themes and patterns that were to recur in Wagner's more mature works. These include redemption, a mysterious stranger demanding that their lover not ask their name, and long expository narratives.

Wagner revised the score of Die Feen in 1834, when he hoped for a production. Among the changes in the 1834 version was the rewriting from scratch of Ada's grand scene Weh' mir, so nah' die fürchterliche Stunde. However, it remained unperformed during his lifetime.

Wagner personally gave the original manuscript of Die Feen to King Ludwig II of Bavaria. The manuscript was later given as a gift to Adolf Hitler, and may have perished with him in flames in his Berlin bunker in the final days of World War II. A draft, in Wagner's hand, of dialogue he wrote to substitute for some of the opera's recitatives, is in the Stefan Zweig Collection at the British Library.

== Performance and recording history ==
Die Feen was premiered in Munich on 29 June 1888 with a cast including several singers who had created roles in Wagner's later operas. It is the only Wagner opera that has not been recorded for broadcast television or video. There are some audio recordings, the one with the best known performers being a live performance conducted by Wolfgang Sawallisch as part of the celebrations of the centenary of the composer's death. On 11 April 2020 the Vienna State Opera streamed the performance of the children's version from 3 March 2012 conducted by Kathleen Kelly on the internet as part of their free offerings during the COVID-19 pandemic.

The English premiere was in Birmingham on 17 May 1969 and the American concert premiere was at the New York City Opera on 24 February 1982. In 1981 Friedrich Meyer-Oertel staged Die Feen at the Opernhaus Wuppertal. In 2009, the opera premiered in France at the Théâtre du Châtelet in Paris. The US staged premiere was held by Lyric Opera of Los Angeles on 11 June 2010, conducted by Robert Sage at the Pasadena Playhouse.

== Roles ==
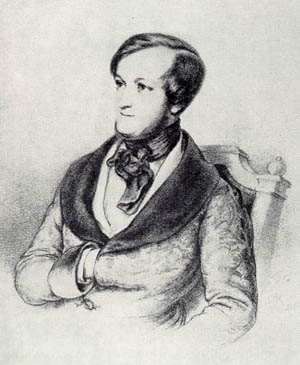
Richard Wagner, c. 1830

Roles, voice type premiere cast
Role	Voice type	Premiere cast, 29 June 1888 Conductor: Franz Fischer
The Fairy King	bass	Victorine Blank
Ada, a fairy	soprano	Lili Dressler
Zemina, a fairy	soprano	Pauline Sigler
Farzana, a fairy	soprano	Marie Sigler
Arindal, King of Tramond	tenor	Max Mikorey
Lora, his sister	soprano	Adrienne Weitz
Morald, her betrothed	baritone	Rudolf Fuchs
Gunther, a courtier from Tramond	tenor	Heinrich Herrmann
Gernot, Arindal's friend	bass	Gustav Siehr
Drolla, Lora's friend	soprano	Emilie Herzog
Harald, General of Groma the magician	bass	Kaspar Bausewein
A messenger	tenor	Max Schlosser
Voice of Groma the Magician	bass	

== Synopsis ==
=== Act 1 ===
While other fairies amuse themselves in a fairy garden, Zemina and Farzana discuss how their mistress Ada, a half-fairy, has renounced her immortality to spend her life with Arindal, the mortal whom she loves. The fairy-king has set a condition which Farzana believes that Arindal will not fulfil even with the help of the magician Groma. Nevertheless, they get the other fairies and spirits to pledge their help in separating Ada from the mortal.

In a rocky wilderness Morald and Gunther meet Gernot. The former pair have been sent to find out what has happened to Arindal, who disappeared eight years ago. In the meantime his father, the king, has died from grief and the kingdom is being attacked by their enemy Murold who demands they surrender Arindal's sister Lora as his wife. Gernot relates how he and Arindal had hunted a beautiful doe to a river where it vanished. They heard a voice and jumped into the river where they found a beautiful woman in luxurious surroundings. She declared her love for Arindal and said they could stay together provided Arindal could go eight years without asking who she is. But the day before he did ask her, and Arindal and Gernot found themselves in the wilderness. Morald and Gunther depart before Arindal can know of their presence. Arindal appears and sings of his grief at the loss of Ada (Wo find ich dich, wo wird mir Trost?). Gernot tries to argue him round to believing that Ada is a sorceress who has abandoned him and that he should return to his kingdom. He sings of an evil witch who had disguised herself as a beautiful woman (War einst 'ne böse Hexe wohl). Gunther returns, disguised as a priest, and continues the attempt to persuade Arindal that he will be turned into a wild beast by the witch unless he returns at once; Morald similarly disguises himself as the ghost of Arindal's father and announces that his kingdom is threatened. Each disguise is magically destroyed just as Arindal is about to be convinced. However, the three are finally able to persuade him of his country's need. They agree to depart in the morning, although Arindal fears he will not see Ada again. When he is left alone he falls into an enchanted sleep.

The scene changes again to a fairy garden with a palace in the background out of which Ada comes. She sings of how she is willing to sacrifice her immortality and pay the price, however hard it is, necessary to win Arindal (Wie muss ich doch beklagen). Arindal awakens and declares his joy at seeing Ada again, but she announces that he will abandon her the next day. Gernot, Gunther and Morald arrive with companions to fetch Arindal. Those who have not seen her before are struck by Ada's beauty and fear Arindal will not come. A procession of fairies comes out of the palace and Zemina and Farzana tell Ada that her father has died and she is now queen. Ada tells Arindal that they must part now but she will see him tomorrow. She asks him to swear that whatever happens he will not curse her. He swears it even though she takes back her request. She expresses her fear that they will both go under as a result of his breaking the oath.

=== Act 2 ===
The people and warriors in Arindal's capital are panicking because they are under attack. Lora berates them, saying that she herself stands firm even though she has lost father, brother and lover. She reminds them of Groma's prophecy that the kingdom will not fall if Arindal returns, but the chorus express doubts. Just as she begins to fear that they are right (O musst du Hoffnung schwinden), a messenger arrives to announce that Arindal is on his way. The new king is greeted joyously by his people, but Arindal himself expresses his fears that he is not strong enough for battle. Meanwhile, Morald and Lora express their mutual love.

Gernot and Gunther talk of the terrible omens of the night and morning. Gernot asks Gunther if Drolla is still beautiful and still loyal to him. Gunther says he believes so but says Gernot should ask her himself as she is nearby. Gernot and Drolla test each other with stories of the many people who love them. Each becomes jealous before they realise that they both truly love each other.

Ada is with Zemina and Farzana. She complains to them of how they heartlessly drive her on. They, however, express hope that she will renounce Arindal and remain immortal. She sings (Weh' mir, so nah' die fürchterliche Stunde) of her fears that Arindal will be cursed with madness and death, and she with being turned to a statue, but then expresses hope that Arindal's love will prove strong.

Battle is raging outside. Arindal is anxious and refuses to lead the army out. Morald does so instead. Ada appears with her two children by Arindal. She seems to throw them into a fiery abyss. Meanwhile, defeated warriors rush in. Ada refuses to console Arindal saying she has come to torment him instead. More defeated warriors arrive with reports that Morald has disappeared, captured or dead. Then Harald, who was sent to bring reinforcements, comes. He reports that his army was defeated by one led by Ada. Arindal curses her. Zemina and Farzana express joy that Ada will remain immortal. But she sorrowfully explains that the fairy-king had required as a condition of her renouncing her immortality, that she conceal her fairy background from Arindal for eight years and on the last day torment him as best she can. If he cursed her, she would remain immortal and be turned to stone for a hundred years while he would go mad and die. In truth, Morald is not dead, the army Harald led was full of traitors, and the children are still alive. Already Arindal can feel his sanity slipping.

=== Act 3 ===
A chorus hail Morald and Lora as the King and Queen who have brought them peace. The couple say they cannot rejoice, because of Arindal's fate. All pray for the curse to be lifted.

Arindal is hallucinating that he is hunting a doe. As it is killed, he realises it is his wife. He continues to experience visions (Ich seh' den Himmel) before falling asleep. The voice of the petrified but weeping Ada is heard calling for him. Then the voice of Groma calls to him too. A sword, shield and lyre appear which Groma says can win Arindal victory and a greater reward. Zemina and Farzana, enter. The former expresses her pity for Arindal while the latter says he deserves punishment for seeking to take Ada from them. They wake him and announce they will lead him to Ada to rescue her. He expresses his willingness to die for her. The two fairies hope this will actually happen.

They lead Arindal to a portal guarded by earth spirits. He is about to be defeated when the voice of Groma reminds him of the shield. The earth spirits disappear when he holds it up. The fairies express their surprise but are sure he will not triumph again. Meanwhile, he thanks Groma's power. Next they encounter bronze men who guard a holy sanctuary. The shield fails Arindal but when Groma advises him to hold up the sword, the bronze men vanish. The fairies again express their surprise whilst Groma's spirit urges Arindal on. They now have reached a grotto where Ada has been turned to stone. The two fairies taunt Arindal with the threat that failure will mean that he too is turned to stone. But the voice of Groma urges him to play the lyre. When he does so (O ihr, des Busens Hochgefühle), Ada is freed from the stone. The two fairies realise that Groma is responsible.

The scene changes to the fairy king's throne room. He has decided to grant Arindal immortality. Ada invites him to rule her fairyland with her. Arindal grants his mortal kingdom to Morald and Lora. Everyone rejoices; even Zemina and Farzana are happy now that Ada remains immortal.

== The music ==
As a German Romantic opera, Die Feen imitated the musical style of Carl Maria von Weber. According to Danilo Prefumo's notes to one of the recordings available, it also showed the influence of Italian opera, grand opera and opéra comique. On the other hand, Alan Blyth, Gramophone's regular Wagner reviewer, sees both Weber and Marschner as influences but says that, by avoiding the aping of Italian opera in Das Liebesverbot and of grand opera in Rienzi, the result was an opera more stylistically unified than its successors. "The later works may contain individual passages that are more 'advanced' than anything in the youthfully imitative ways of Die Feen, but as entities they are less satisfying."

In The New York Times, critic John Rockwell acknowledges the presence of passages imitative of Weber and Marschner but says that there are "wonderfully original passages too... Some of the instrumental writing is exquisite. And especially in the final two acts, there are ensembles and scenes of undeniable strength of personality. This is not some quaint antiquarian resurrection, but an opera that can work for today's audiences on stage." Blyth is less wholehearted in his support. In 1984, he wrote "The libretto is impossibly awkward, its language stilted, many of its musical structures ill-considered, but much is enjoyable in its own right as much as for the enjoyment in discovering seeds of future triumphs."

The Weberian overture in E major, the key in which the opera begins and ends, includes many of the opera's principal themes. The work as a whole does not have the complex chains of melody and chromatic harmony that distinguished the composer's mature works. However, there is already a tendency in the opera to move away from a strict numbers form and to present the singers with long challenging passages. Recurring themes or simple leitmotifs associated with characters and situations already show a tendency towards something that Wagner would later use in a far more sophisticated manner in his mature works. Another anticipation of the composer's mature manner is how orchestra often carries the tune while vocal parts are declamatory. Of the various arias, Blyth picks out Ada's "huge act 2 scene, which calls for a genuine dramatic soprano" noting that Birgit Nilsson had recorded it. He sees the ensembles as anticipating Tannhäuser and Lohengrin but picks out "the delightful buffo duet for Gernot... and Drolla", saying it looks forward more to Das Liebesverbot "except that it surpasses in unassuming tunefulness anything in the following score".

== Recordings ==
There are ten recordings of Die Feen available as of 2015, only the first of which is a studio recording.

- Die Feen, conducted by Edward Downes with April Cantelo (Ada), John Mitchinson (Arindal), Della Jones (Farzana), Tom McDonnell (Morald) etc. BBC Northern Symphony Orchestra, BBC Northern Singers. Uncut, studio recording (Manchester College of Music), early May 1974. (Deutsche Grammophon Complete Wagner Edition 00289 479675–7)
- Die Feen, conducted by Wolfgang Sawallisch, with a cast including John Alexander (Arindal), Linda Esther Gray (Ada), June Anderson (Lora), Cheryl Studer (Drolla), Kurt Moll (Fairy King) etc. live performance with multiple cuts to the score Munich Opera Festival (1983) (ORFEO C 062 833 F)
- Die Feen, conducted by Gabor Ötvös with Raimo Sirkiä (Arindal), Sue Patchell (Ada), Arthur Korn (Gernot), Birgit Beer (Drolla) etc. live recording from Teatro Comunale di Cagliari (1998) (Dynamic CDS 217/1-3)
- Die Feen, conducted by Sebastian Weigle with Burkhard Fritz (Arindal), Tamara Wilson (Ada), Thorsten Grümbel (Gernot), Brenda Rae (Lora), etc. live recording of the concert performances, May 3 and 6 2011 at the Alte Oper Frankfurt (2011) (Oehms Classics)
- Die Feen, conducted by Xiao Juan Chen. Live recording by the CMD German Opera Company of Berlin, April 2016

Conductors who have recorded the overture include Francesco D'Avalos (Asv Living Era B0000030XD), Marek Janowski (Angel B00005UVAN), Franz Konwitschny (Archipel ARPCD0239), Alexander Rahbari (Naxos B0001Z65J4), Alois Springer (Vox B000001KAH) and Hans Swarowsky (Vox B000001KD3).
