= Bergalli =

Bergalli is a surname. Notable people with the surname include:

- Gustavo Bergalli (born 1940), Argentine jazz trumpeter and bandleader
- Luisa Bergalli (1703–1779), Venetian writer and translator
