= Fat Pig =

Play by Neil LaBute

- Fat Pig 2008 London Run poster
- Original language: English
- Written by: Neil LaBute
- Characters: Helen; Tom; Carter; Jeannie
- Genre: Comedy

Premiere
- Date: 2004
- Place: Off-Broadway
- Official website

Fat Pig is a play by Neil LaBute. The play premiered off-Broadway in 2004 and won the 2005 Outer Critics Circle Award for Outstanding Off-Broadway Play. The play had its West End premiere in 2008 and was nominated for the Laurence Olivier Award for Best New Comedy. The play involves a romantic relationship between a plus-size woman and a young professional man whose friend denigrates the woman as being "fat". The play was also adapted into an opera in 2022 by composer Matt Boehler.

== Plot synopsis ==
In a large city, professional businessman Tom meets overweight librarian Helen in a crowded restaurant at lunch. Tom is taken with Helen's brash acceptance of how people see her and her in-your-face honesty, and they begin dating. After a few weeks, Carter, Tom's best friend at work, suspects that Tom has a new girlfriend. He badgers Tom for details, finally raising the matter in front of Jeannie, a woman from accounting whom Tom had been seeing casually for a while. Jeannie becomes distraught, and Tom admits that he is "sort of" seeing this new woman.

Carter continues his inquiries and, when Tom says he is busy that night, suspects that Tom is going on a date despite his protests that he is going to a business dinner with people from the Chicago branch office. That evening, Carter goes to a restaurant that he knows Tom likes and sees Tom and Helen together. Carter introduces himself to Helen and, when she excuses herself, he berates her as a "fat pig", assuming that Tom would never date anyone like her and that she is in fact from the Chicago office. (Note: Known for obesity, 61% of adults in metropolitan Chicago are overweight or obese (2018 data).)

Jeannie learns about "the fat cow from Chicago" from gossip with Carter, and later discovers that Chicago hadn't sent anyone for meetings. She confronts Tom, demanding to know where they stand. Tom replies that he is romantically uninterested in her and will remain so, and admits that he was not at a business dinner. Jeannie slaps Tom, hurt that he would pick an obese woman over her. Carter apologizes to Tom for his rudeness about Helen, but, after pestering Tom for a picture, shows it to everyone in the office who laugh at the "fat pig" Tom is dating. Carter tries to convince Tom that he should "stick to his kind".

Meanwhile, Tom and Helen fall deeper in love. Helen informs Tom that she has been offered a better job in another city but does not want to leave him. She asks if she can meet his friends; when he hesitates, she believes that he is ashamed of her weight. Later, Tom takes Helen to his company's beach barbecue, where they become secluded with everyone else making jokes and ridiculing Helen's weight behind her back. Seeing Tom embarrassed and ostracized, Helen gives him an ultimatum: to accept her and defend her to his friends or end their relationship. Tom replies that he cannot handle it and that she should take the other job. They walk away from each other, brokenhearted.

== Character guide ==
- Tom: The plot's protagonist, a man in his late 20s to early 30s, considered to be stereotypical until he meets and falls in love with Helen.
- Helen: A quite heavy, though self-confident, librarian. She becomes Tom's love interest and the catalyst for his change of view.
- Carter: Tom's closest friend at the office. Carter represents the selfish and shallow qualities that Tom is trying to overcome. Carter is the play's consummate antagonist.
- Jeannie: A co-worker at Tom's office. They used to date, but Tom was never fully committed. Jeannie's self-confidence is damaged because Tom dumps her for a "fat girl".

LaBute provides few details about the characters' lives besides the fact that they all work and are approximately the same age group.

== Production history ==
Fat Pig premiered off-Broadway in 2004. This was followed by over a dozen productions internationally, between 2006 and 2010, including in London's West End. In 2011 a planned Broadway production was cancelled due to the loss of a key investor.

=== Off-Broadway premiere ===
Fat Pig premiered off-Broadway at the Lucille Lortel Theatre in an MCC Theater production, in previews on November 23, 2004, and officially on December 15. The production was directed by Jo Bonney, with cast Ashlie Atkinson (Helen), Andrew McCarthy (Carter), Jeremy Piven (Tom), and Keri Russell (Jeannie) in her stage debut. This production was hailed as a provocative comedy that made the audience think. David Amsden wrote in New York Magazine:

You emerge from his plays either praising him for the metaphoric slap in the face or wishing you knew where he lived, so you can hunt down the bastard and deliver a literal slap of your own ... His cruel wit and chronicles of immoral moralizers have made him, arguably, the most legitimately provocative and polarizing playwright at work today.

=== LaBute Festival, Washington ===
The play was showcased during the LaBute Festival at the Studio Theatre in Washington D.C. in 2006. The play featured Tyler Pierce (Tom) and Kate Debelack (Helen).

=== Madrid ===
The play opened at Teatro Alcázar in Madrid in January 2006. It was directed by Tamzin Townsend and featured Luis Merlo (Tom), Teté Delgado (Helen), Iñaki Miramón and Lidia Otón.

=== San Jose, California ===
The play was staged in San Jose, California, at City Lights Theatre Company, under the direction of Tom Gough, its former artistic director. It held a successful run from January 25 to February 25, 2007, and received high praise.

=== Boston ===
The play made its New England debut in Boston from March 16 to April 7, 2007, at the Boston Center for the Arts by the SpeakEasy Stage Company. The cast included James Ryen (Tom), Liliane Klein (Helen), Michael Daniel Anderson (Carter), and Laura Latreille (Jeannie).

=== Los Angeles ===
The Los Angeles, California, premiere was May 11, 2007, at the Geffen Playhouse's Audrey Skirball-Kenis Theater, with a cast including Kirsten Vangsness (Helen), Scott Wolf (Tom), Chris Pine (Carter), and Andrea Anders (Jeannie). The play, originally scheduled to run until June 10, 2007, was extended to July 1, 2007, with a new cast: original New York cast member Atkinson reprising Helen, Joseph Sikora as Tom, Jon Bernthal as Carter, and Jamie Ray Newman as Jeannie.

=== London ===
Its UK premiere was on May 27, 2008, at the Trafalgar Studios, London, with a cast including Ella Smith as Helen, Robert Webb as Tom, Kris Marshall as Carter and Joanna Page as Jeannie.

In August, it was announced that both Marshall and Webb would be stepping down from their roles and be replaced by Kevin Bishop and Nicholas Burns, respectively. Also announced later in the same month was that Page would be stepping down from her role and would be replaced by Kelly Brook and Katie Kerr would replace Ella Smith in October 2008.

On September 11, 2008, the play was shown at the Comedy Theatre.

=== Colombia ===
The Colombia premiere was on March 31 at the Teatro Nacional La Castellana in Bogota, directed by Mario Morgan with cast Constanza Hernández (Helena), Fabián Mendoza (Tommy), Tatiana Rentería (Julia) and Juan Sebastián Aragón.

=== Berkeley, California ===
The play was staged in Berkeley, CA at the Aurora Theatre Company. Previews began on October 30, 2009, and opening night was November 5. The play was directed by Barbara Damashek and featured Boston cast member Klein reprising Helen, Jud Williford as Tom, Peter Ruocco as Carter, and Alexandra Creighton as Jeannie. The play was extended one week through December 13.

The production was hailed by San Francisco Chronicle drama critic Robert Hurwitt, who wrote, "This is LaBute at the best of his bad-boy sensitive mode." Arielle Little wrote in The Daily Californian:

Playwright Neil LaBute's Fat Pig... is an alternately rude and heartwarming play with sweet moments, insults, and profanity. It is an all-out assault on the image-obsessed, morally craven culture that the current generation constantly is bombarded with and often embraces. And it is so good it is almost painful to watch. It is, in short, the type of theater we need to be seeing.

=== Philadelphia ===
Pennsylvania's Theatre Horizon company staged the play from April 9 to May 1, 2010. It was directed by Matthew Decker and featured Ed Renninger (Tom), Melissa Joy Hart (Helen), Paul Felder (Carter), and Erin Mulgrew (Jeannie).

=== Mexico City ===
During April 2010, the show was staged in Mexico City at the Teatro Fernando Soler. Under the title Gorda (lit. 'Fat Woman'), the production was set in Mexico and presented in Spanish.

=== São Paulo ===
Under the title Gorda, the show was staged in São Paulo, Brazil, at Teatro Procópio Ferreira. It ran from March 4 to the end of May 2010. It was directed by the Argentinian Daniel Veronese, who also staged this version of the play for almost two years in Buenos Aires, Argentina.

The play is set in Brazil, with cast Fabiana Karla (Helena); Michel Bercovitch (Tony), who was nominated for the Shell award for his performance in this play; Mouhamed Harchouf (Caco); and Flávia Rubim (Joana). This same play was previously presented in Rio de Janeiro with the same cast.

=== Hong Kong ===
Fat Pig made its Asian premiere at Hong Kong Cultural Centre Studio from August 20 to August 29, 2010. It was translated by Chong Mui-Ngam and directed by Wong Long-Bun. Four young local actors were cast in the lead roles.

=== Nova Scotia ===
Plutonium Playhouse's production ran November 18–21, 2010, as part of its Sex Festival program. The play was directed by Natasha MacLellan, and starred Michael McPhee (Tom), Jessica Barry (Helen), Matthew Lumley (Carter) and Stacy Smith (Jeannie). McPhee, Barry, and Lumley were all nominated for Robert Merritt Awards for the well-received production.

=== Cancelled Broadway production ===
A Broadway production was cancelled due to financing issues less than a month before its scheduled premiere at the Belasco Theatre. Cast included Josh Hamilton (Tom), HeatherJane Rolff (Helen), Dane Cook (Carter), and Julia Stiles (Jeannie). Tickets had been sold and it was to begin previews on April 12 and open officially on April 26, 2011. This would have been LaBute's Broadway directorial debut. However, before the show began it was postponed for financial reasons, as a key investor dropped out. There had been hopes to reschedule the production for the 2011–12 season.

=== Melbourne ===
In February 2013, Melbourne production company Lab Kelpie Productions announced it would produce the play October 8–20, 2013, at Chapel Off Chapel in Melbourne, Australia. Daniel Frederiksen has been attached to direct with Lyall Brooks and Lulu McClatchy in the roles of Tom and Helen.

== Awards and nominations ==
- Winner of the Outstanding Off-Broadway Play in 2005
- Nominated for Laurence Olivier Awards for Best New Comedy in 2005
