= Francesco Bartoli =

Italian actor, playwright, and writer

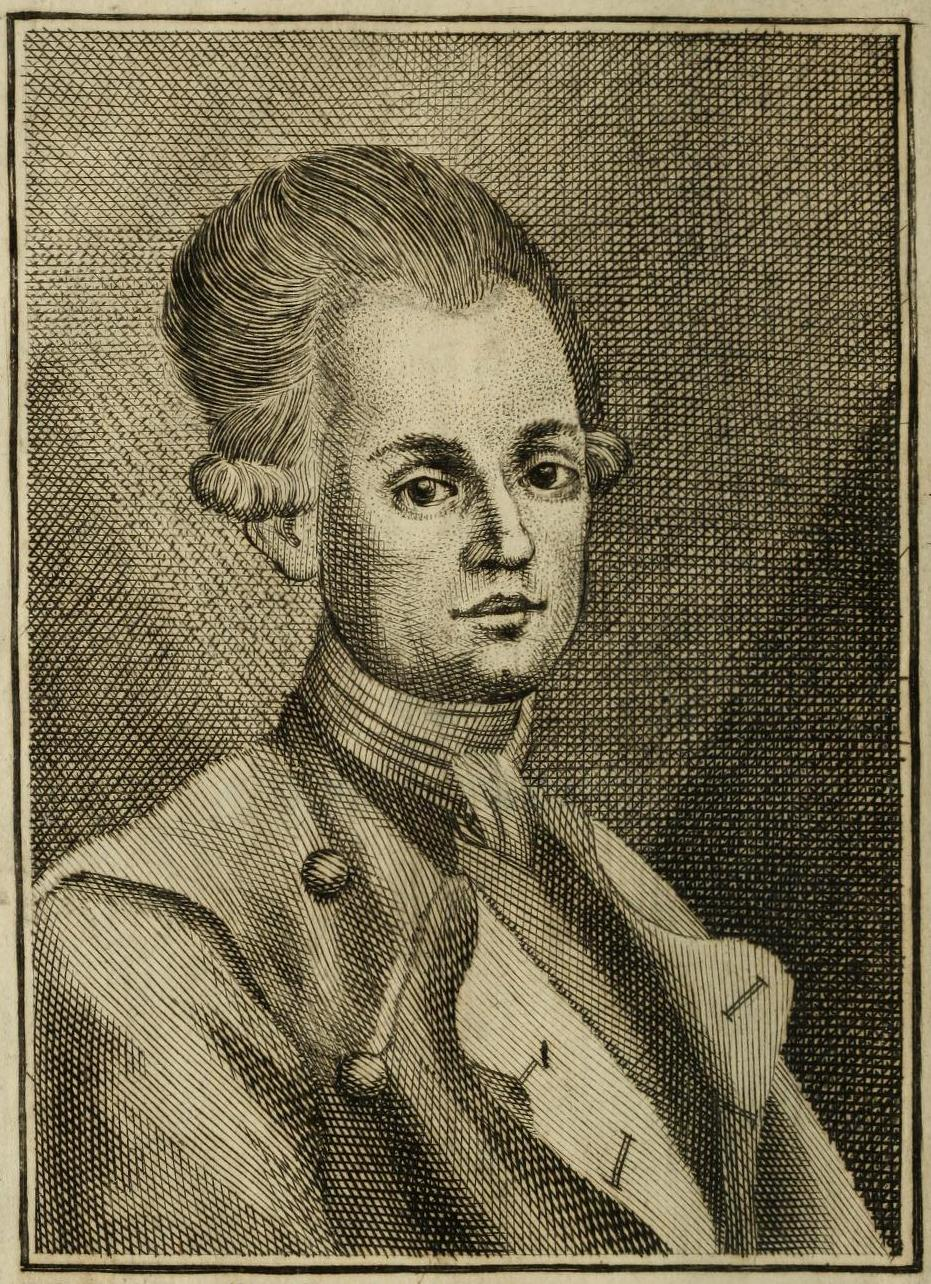
Francesco Bartoli c. 1776

Francesco Saverio Bartoli (1745–1806) was an Italian actor born in Bologna, playwright, and writer. He is most remembered today for his biographical dictionary, Notizie istoriche de' comici italiani. It was the first serious attempt to document the lives and works of Italian actors from the commedia dell'arte in 1550 through the late 18th century and is still considered one of the most important sources of information about the Italian theatrical profession during that period.

== Career ==
Francesco first directed amateur improvising groups and further directed minor professional companies, and finally joined the major troupe led by Petro Rossi. He married a leading actress Teodora Ricci in 1769. After two years later, Francesco and his wife joined an important company during those years, which was led by Antonio Sacco.
