= Ghost Light (2018 film) =

- Film poster
- Directed by: John Stimpson
- Written by: John Stimpson; Geoffrey Taylor
- Starring: Roger Bart; Tom Riley; Shannyn Sossamon; Danielle Campbell; Scott Adsit; Steve Tom; Carol Kane; Cary Elwes
- Release date: September 22, 2018 (LA Film Festival)
- Running time: 102 minutes
- Country: United States
- Language: English

Ghost Light is a 2018 American comedy horror film directed by John Stimpson and written by Stimpson and Geoffrey Taylor. Starring Roger Bart, Tom Riley, Shannyn Sossamon, Danielle Campbell, Carol Kane, and Cary Elwes, the film follows a travelling Shakespeare troupe whose production of Macbeth falls victim to the play's superstitious curse. The title of the film refers to the electric light left on stage while a theater is unoccupied.

== Plot ==
A travelling Shakespeare troupe arrives at a lodge for their latest production of Macbeth. Untalented, but wealthy soap opera actor Alex Pankhurst portrays the lead character, while Lady Macbeth is played by his wife Liz Beth Stevens. Liz is secretly having an affair with Thomas Ingram, the actor playing Banquo, who desires the role of Macbeth. Both dismiss the superstitious curse surrounding the play, openly stating its name as they are alone on stage.

The next day, Alex is struck on the head by a metal rod, but develops a newfound acting ability upon awakening. Thomas and Liz soon find their lives paralleling those of Macbeth and Lady Macbeth, with a reluctant Thomas being encouraged by Liz to kill Alex in order to become the play's lead and Liz hallucinating her husband's blood on her hands. Tensions between the two are exacerbated by Thomas developing an attraction to Juliet Miller, a backpacker who joins the cast as one of the witches.

As the production begins in front of a sold-out crowd, it becomes afflicted by supernatural events. Thomas and Liz are killed during their characters' death scenes, while lodge caretakers Eloise and Edna Levesque infiltrate the cast to join Juliet as the witches. When the visions conjured by the witches cause Alex to leave the stage, Thomas' ghost replaces him as Macbeth. The rest of the cast and crew finds themselves trapped in the dressing room as the production is taken over by ghosts of other actors, with the audience also revealed as ghosts. Once the play is completed, Thomas and Liz's ghosts join the rest of the supernatural entities in the final curtain call before disappearing alongside them.

With the ghosts gone, the troupe manages to escape the dressing room, where they discover the theater to be completely empty. The real Eloise and Edna arrive, leaving the troupe at a loss for words.

== Cast ==
- Roger Bart as Henry Asquith, the director
- Tom Riley as Thomas Ingram, the actor playing Banquo
- Shannyn Sossamon as Liz Beth Stevens, the actress playing Lady Macbeth and Alex's wife
- Danielle Campbell as Juliet Miller, a mysterious backpacker cast as one of the witches
- Cary Elwes as Alex Pankhurst, a former soap opera star playing Macbeth and Liz's husband
- Carol Kane as Madeline Styne, a superstitious actress playing one of the witches
- Steve Tom as Elliot Wadsworth, a veteran actor playing Duncan
- Scott Adsit as Archie MacIntosh, the stage manager
- Alex Portenko as Nigel Bloom, a stagehand and Troy's ex-boyfriend who also plays one of the murderers
- Sheldon Best as Troy Mattson, a stagehand and Nigel's ex-boyfriend who also plays one of the murderers
- Caroline Portu as Annabel Anderson, a stagehand in a relationship with Jason who also plays one of the witches
- Nolan Gerard Funk as Jason Palmer, a stagehand in a relationship with Annabel

Liliane Klein and Zele Avradopoulos portray the ghosts who impersonate caretakers Eloise and Edna Levesque, while the real Eloise and Edna are played by Mary Callanan and Maureen Keiller. Ken Cheeseman appears as George Pitard, the theater's owner. The ghost of the actor playing Macduff is portrayed by Jason Mulcahy.

== Release ==
The film premiered at the LA Film Festival on September 22, 2018. It was then released on digital platforms on June 18, 2019.

== Reception ==
The film has a 74% rating on Rotten Tomatoes. The site's critical consensus reads, "Fittingly given its title, Ghost Light balances dark supernatural elements against quirky comedy to create a satisfying blend of both." Alan Ng of Film Threat awarded the film four out of ten stars.
