= Teodora Ricci-Bàrtoli =

Teodora Ricci-Bàrtoli (Verona 1750 - Venezia 1806), was a Venetian actress.

She was the student of Francesco Bartoli, whom she married in 1769. She was the leading lady of the Venetian stage. One of her best known parts was the main role of La principessa filosofa by Carlo Gozzi. Between 1777 and 1782, she was engaged at the Théâtre Italien in Paris.

In 1775, she was involved in the Gratarolo affair regarding secretary of state Antonio Gratarolo. In 1772, Gratarolo had defeated Caterina Dolfin's candidate for the post of ambassador to Savoy. Upon his return to Venice in 1775, he had an affair with Teodora, which made him a rival of Dolfin's friend Gozzi, who wrote a libelous play about Gratarolo: this caricature was answered with another, which caricatured Dolfin and her circle and blackened her name and reputation publicly.
