= Gasparo Gozzi =

Italian literary critic (1713–1786)

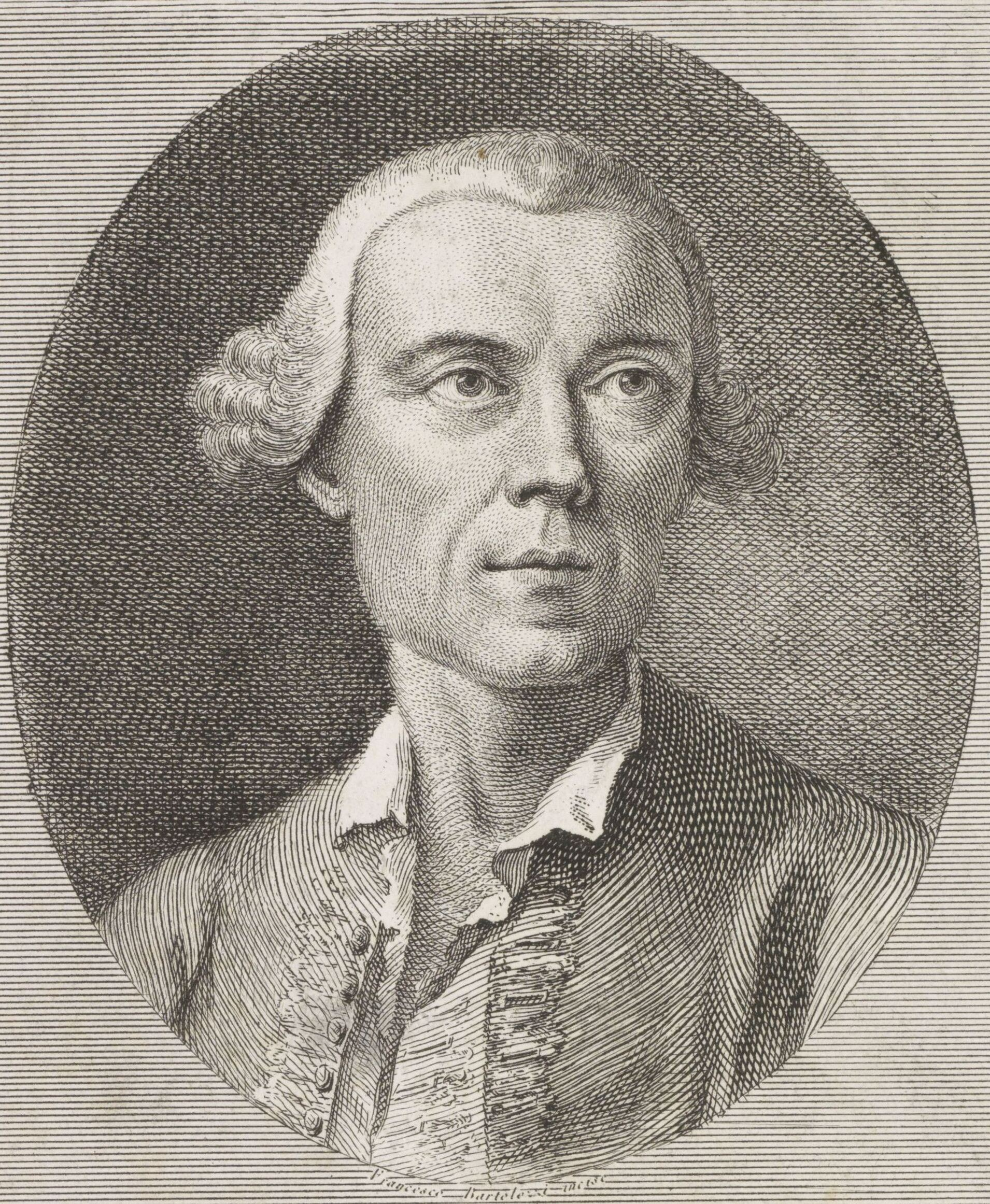
- Portrait of Gozzi by Francesco Bartolozzi
- Born: December 4, 1713
- Died: December 26, 1786 (aged 73); Padua, Italy
- Resting place: San Michele Cemetery, Venice
- Occupations: Critic, dramatist
- Spouse: Luisa Bergalli (m. 1739)
- Children: 5
- Family: Carlo Gozzi (brother)

Gasparo, count Gozzi (4 December 1713 – 26 December 1786) was a Venetian critic and dramatist.

== Life and works ==
Gasparo Gozzi was the first of eleven children born to the Venetian Count Jacopo Antonio and Angela Tiepolo, who was also of noble family. His younger brother was Carlo Gozzi. After early studies at home with tutors, he entered the College of Murano, where he acquired a solid liberal arts education and then followed courses in mathematics and law, although his interests were already firmly turned to literature.

In 1739, he married the poet Luisa Bergalli, by whom he was eventually to have five children. In 1747 they undertook the management of the theatre of Sant'Angelo in Venice, with Gozzi supplying the performers with dramas chiefly translated from the French. The idea had been to remedy their precarious financial situation but the theatre lost money and they had to give it up the following year, although he continued his work as a dramatist.

Gozzi went on to build a reputation for works of moral seriousness in both prose and verse, in particular the 14 prose Dialoghi dell’isola di Circe (Dialogues from Circe's Island) that were published over the four-year period (1760–64). These drew their inspiration from Giovan Battista Gelli's La Circe dialogues of two centuries earlier. Ulysses has been given leave by Circe to talk to the men on her island that have changed into beasts. These include figures from fable (The fox and the crow, XIII) and from myth and give a picture of society at variance. Far from needing the intervention of Circe, the victims find their natural condition as soon as they set foot on the island. The sole exception is the bear, a satirist who had dared to criticize Circe and had been changed as a punishment (IX). It is this noble critic of the human condition (representing Gozzi himself) who is the only one that wishes to regain his human form.

In 1760 Gozzi had launched the Gazzetta Veneta as a Venetian equivalent of the English Spectator, followed by L'Osservatore Veneto. Although neither were particularly successful, he had made himself known as one of the ablest critics and purest and most elegant stylists in Italy. From 1762 he was compensated for the disappointment of his journalistic failure by receiving his first public offices of some importance, first in the University of Padua and then for the Republic. In this role he wrote, among other things, three reports on the state of the art of printing in Venice. The first outlined Venetian publishing history from its origins to the eighteenth century, researching the causes of this decline and proposing remedies, while the others envisaged projects for its successful future development. For a considerable period he was censor of the press in Venice, and in 1774 he was appointed to reorganize the university system at Padua, where he remained till his death. His tomb is at the San Michele cemetery on the Isola di San Michele, along with his brother Carlo Gozzi's grave.

== Works ==
His principal writings are:

- Lettere famigliari (1755), a collection of short racy pieces in prose and verse, on subjects of general interest
- Sermoni, poems in blank verse after the manner of Horace (the first 12 published in 1763, six more added posthumously)
- Giudizio degli antichi poeti sopra la moderna censura di Dante (1755), a defence of the great poet against the attacks of Bettinelli.

He also translated various works from the French and English, including Jean-François Marmontel's Tales and Alexander Pope's Essay on Criticism. His collected works were published at Venice, 1794–1798, in 12 volumes, and several editions have appeared since.

== Bibliography ==
- Also Domenico Proietti's article in the Dizionario Biografico degli Italiani, Volume 58 (2002)
