= Carlo Gozzi =

Italian playwright (1720–1806)

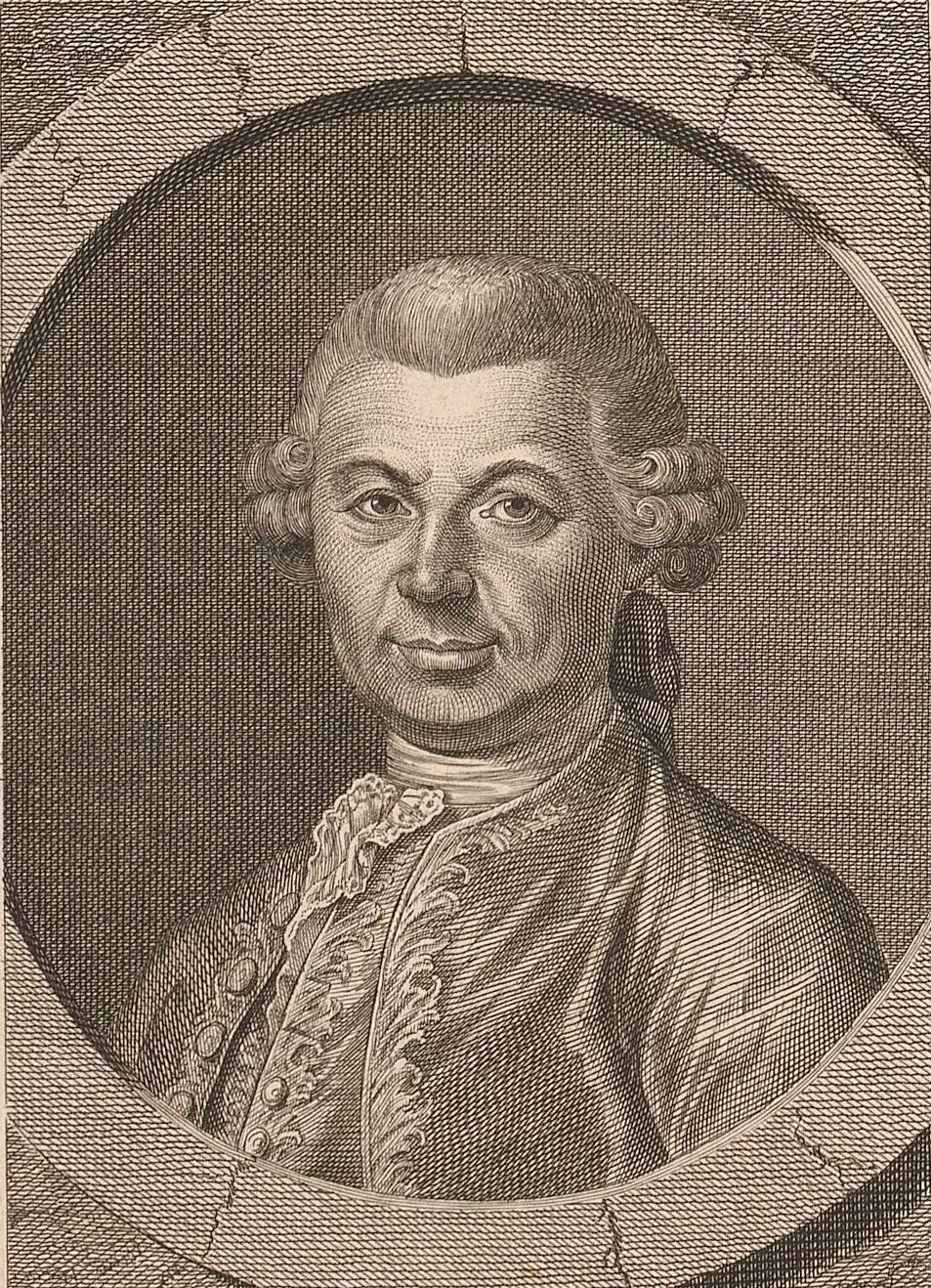
- Engraved portrait of Carlo Gozzi by Gustav Georg Endner, c. 1764
- Born: 13 December 1720; Venice, Republic of Venice (present-day Italy)
- Died: 4 April 1806 (aged 85); Venice, Austrian Empire
- Resting place: San Michele Cemetery, Venice
- Occupations: Playwright; writer
- Partner: Teodora Ricci-Bàrtoli
- Writing career
- Language: Venetian; Italian
- Period: from 1757
- Genres: Comedy; tragicomedy; memoirs
- Notable works: Turandot; La donna serpente
- Literary movement: Commedia dell'arte

Signature
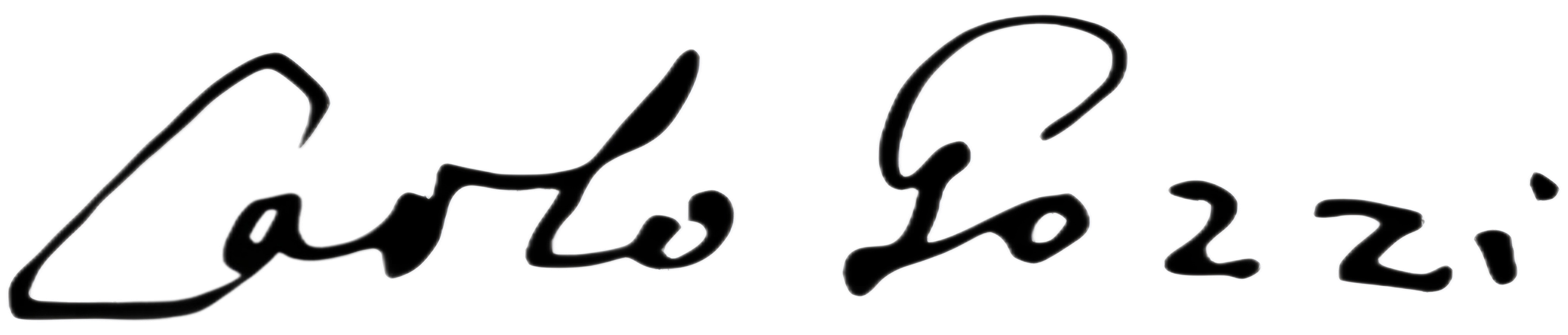

Carlo, Count Gozzi (Italian: [ˈkarlo ˈɡɔddzi]; 13 December 1720 – 4 April 1806) was an Italian (Note: Though the modern Republic of Italy had yet to be established, the Latin equivalent of the term Italian had been in use for natives of the region since antiquity.) (Venetian) playwright and champion of Commedia dell'arte.

== Early life ==
Gozzi was born and died in Venice; he came from a family of minor Venetian aristocracy, the Tiepolos. At a young age, his parents were no longer able to support him financially, so he joined the army in Dalmatia. Three years later, he had returned to Venice and joined the Granelleschi Society. This society was dedicated to preserving Tuscan literature from the influence of foreign culture; it was particularly interested in handing down traditional Italian comedic performance: the Commedia dell'arte.

== Works ==
Pietro Chiari and Carlo Goldoni, two Venetian writers, were moving away from the old style of Italian theatre, which threatened the work of the Granelleschi Society. In 1757 Gozzi defended Commedia dell'arte by publishing a satirical poem, La tartana degli influssi per l'anno 1756; and in 1761, in his comedy based on a fairy tale, The Love for Three Oranges or Analisi riflessiva della fiaba L'amore delle tre melarance, he parodied Chiari and Goldoni. He engaged the Sacchi company of players, a Commedia dell'arte troupe who had had dwindling engagements because of Chiari and Goldoni's efforts. Their acting was informed by personal vendetta, making the play an extraordinary success. Gozzi donated his play and the rest of his fairy tales to Sacchi's troupe, in effect saving the company. Gozzi's efforts on behalf of the genre were anachronistic, since Gozzi wrote out all his scripts. whereas traditional Commedia dell'arte was always improvised.

Struck by the effect produced on the audience by the introduction of the supernatural or mythical element, which he had merely used as a convenient medium for his satirical purposes, Gozzi produced a series of dramatic pieces based on fairy tales. These were hugely popular, but after Sacchi's company disbanded, they were unjustly neglected. Gozzi's fairy tales drew influence from Commedia dell'arte, and the popularity of them caused a revival of Commedia dell'arte in Italy. These fairy tales were much praised by Goethe, Schlegel brothers, Hoffmann, Madame de Staël, Sismondi and Ostrovsky. One of them, Turandot or La Turandotte, was translated by Friedrich Schiller and staged by Goethe in Weimar in 1802 with great success. Gozzi was acclaimed throughout most of Europe, but was less esteemed in his own homeland.

In the last years of Gozzi's life he had begun to experiment by producing tragedies with largely comical influences, but these endeavors were met with harsh critical response. He then began to work in Spanish drama, and found minor success before his death. He was buried in the church of San Cassiano in Venice.

== Personal life ==
His feuds with Carlo Goldoni and Pietro Chiari between 1756-1762 were legion. They argued over the changing style of Italian theatre and Gozzi's concern about losing Commedia dell'arte.

He was the titular protector of the actress Teodora Ricci. When Pier Antonio Gratarol, a member of Venetian society whom Gozzi's Draghe d'Amore was partially based on, had an affair with her, Gozzi was instrument in Gratrol's exile.

The writer Gasparo Gozzi was his brother.

His collected works were published under his own superintendence at Venice in 1792, in 10 volumes.

A number of twentieth-century stage works were inspired by Gozzi's plays. These include treatments of Turandot by Karl Vollmöller and Bertolt Brecht, operas based on the same story by Ferruccio Busoni, and, more famously, Giacomo Puccini, Sergei Prokofiev's The Love of Three Oranges, Alfredo Casella's La donna serpente and Hans Werner Henze's König Hirsch. He shares his tomb with his brother Gasparo Gozzi at the San Michele cemetery on the Isola di San Michele.

== Works ==
=== Plays ===
Fiabe Teatrali — "Tales for the Theatre"

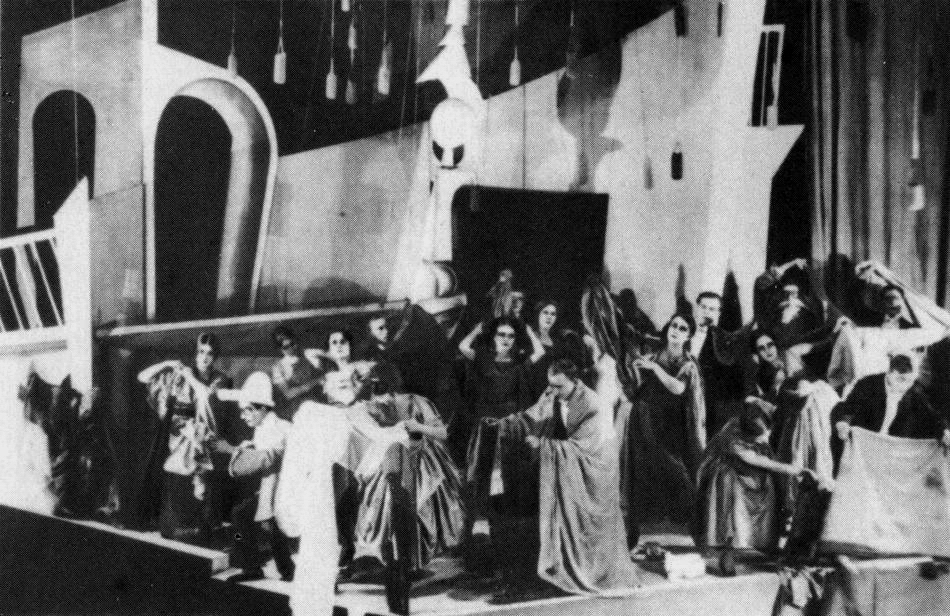
Carlo Gozzi's Turandot, 1922 performance by the Russian theater director Yevgeny Vakhtangov

- L'amore delle tre melarance — "The Love of Three Oranges" (1761)
- Il corvo — "The Raven" (1761)
- Il re cervo — "The King Stag" (1762)
- Turandot (1762)
- La donna serpente — "The Serpent Woman" (1762)
- La Zobeide (1763)
- I Pitocchi Fortunati — "The Fortunate Beggars" (1764)
- Il Mostro Turchino — "The Blue Monster" (1764)
- L'Augellino Bel Verde — "The Green Bird" (1765)
- Zeim, Re de' Geni — "Zeim, King of the Genies" (1765)

Other plays

- Marfisa bizzarra (1766)
- The Elixir of Love (1775/1776)
- Il Cavaliere Amico; o sia, Il Trionfo dell'Amicizia — "The Knight; or, The Triumph of Friendship" (Tragicomedy in 5 Acts)
- Doride; o sia, La Rassegnata — "Doride; or, The Resigned" (Tragicomedy in 5 Acts)
- La Donna Vendicativa — "The Vengeful Woman" (Tragicomedy in 5 Acts)
- La Caduta di Donna Elvira, Regina di Navarra — "The Fall of Donna Elvira, Queen of Navarre" [Prologo Tragico].
- La Punizione nel Precipizio — "Punishment in the Precipice" (Tragicomedy in 3 Acts)
- Il Pubblico Secreto — "The Public Secret" (Comedy in 3 Acts)
- Le Due Notti Affannose; o sia, gl'Inganni della Immaginazione — "Two Frantic Nights; or, Illusions of Imagination" (Tragicomedy in 5 Acts)
- La Principessa Filosofa; o sia, Il Controveleno — "The Princess Philosopher; or, The Antidote" (Drama in 3 Acts)
- I Due Fratelli Nimici — "The Two Enemy Brothers" (Tragicomedy in 3 Acts)
- Eco e Narciso — "Echo and Narcissus" (Seriocomic Pastoral with Music in 3 Acts)
- Il Moro di Corpo Bianco; o sia, Lo Schiavo del Proprio Onore — "The Moor with White Body; or, The Slave of his own Honor" (Tragicomedy in 5 Acts)
- La Donna Contraria al Consiglio — "The Woman Against the Council" (Scenic Composition in 5 Acts)
- Cimene Pardo — "Cimene Pardo" (Tragedy in 5 Acts)
- Innamorata da Vero — "True Love" (Comedy in 3 Acts)
- Bianca Contessa di Melfi; o sia, Il Maritaggio per Vendetta — "Bianca, Countess of Malfi; or, the Maritaggio for Vendetta" (Tragedy in 5 Acts)
- Il Montanaro Don Giovanni Pasquale — "The Montanaro Don Giovanni Pasquale" (Moral Stage Action in 5 Acts)
- La Figlia dell'Aria; o sia, L'Innalzamento di Semiramide — "Daughter of the Air; or, The Rise of Semiramis" (Allegorical Tale in 3 Acts)
- Il Metafisico; o sia, L'Amore, e L'Amicizia alla Prova — "The Metaphysical; or, Love and Friendship Put to the Test" (Drama 3 Acts)
- Annibale, Duca di Atene — "Hannibal, Duke of Athens" (Verse Representation in 5 Acts)
- La Malia della Voce — "The Woman's(?) Voice" (Drama 5 Acts)
- Amore Assottiglia il Cervello — "Love Thins the Brain" (Comedy in 5 Acts)
- La Vedova del Malabar — "The Widow of Malabar" (Tragedy in 5 Acts)

=== Other works ===
- Ragionamento ingenuo, e storia sincera dell'origine delle mie dieci Fiabe teatrali — "Ingenuous Disquisition and Sincere History of My Ten Tales for the Theatre" (1772)
- Memorie Inutili — "Useless Memoirs" (1777, published 1797)

== Editions ==
- Carlo Gozzi, Memorie inutili (éd. Giuseppe Prezzolini). Laterza, Bari 1910.
- Carlo Gozzi, Opere del Co: Carlo Gozzi. Colombani, Venezia/Firenze 1772[-1774].
- Carlo Gozzi, Opere edite ed inedite del Co. Carlo Gozzi. Zanardi, Venezia 1801[-1803].
- Carlo Gozzi, Opere. Teatro e polemiche teatrali (éd. Giorgio Petronio). Rizzoli, Milano 1962.
- Scritti di Carlo Gozzi, éd. E. Bonora. Einaudi, Torino 1977.
- Carlo Gozzi, Le fiabe teatrali (= Biblioteca di Cultura. 261). Testo, introduzione e commento a cura di Paolo Bosisio. Bulzoni, Rom 1984.
- Carlo Gozzi, Theatralische Werke. Aus dem italiänischen übersezt. 5 voll. Typographische Gesellschaft, Bern 1777–1779.
