= Teatro Procópio Ferreira =

Theatre in São Paulo, Brazil

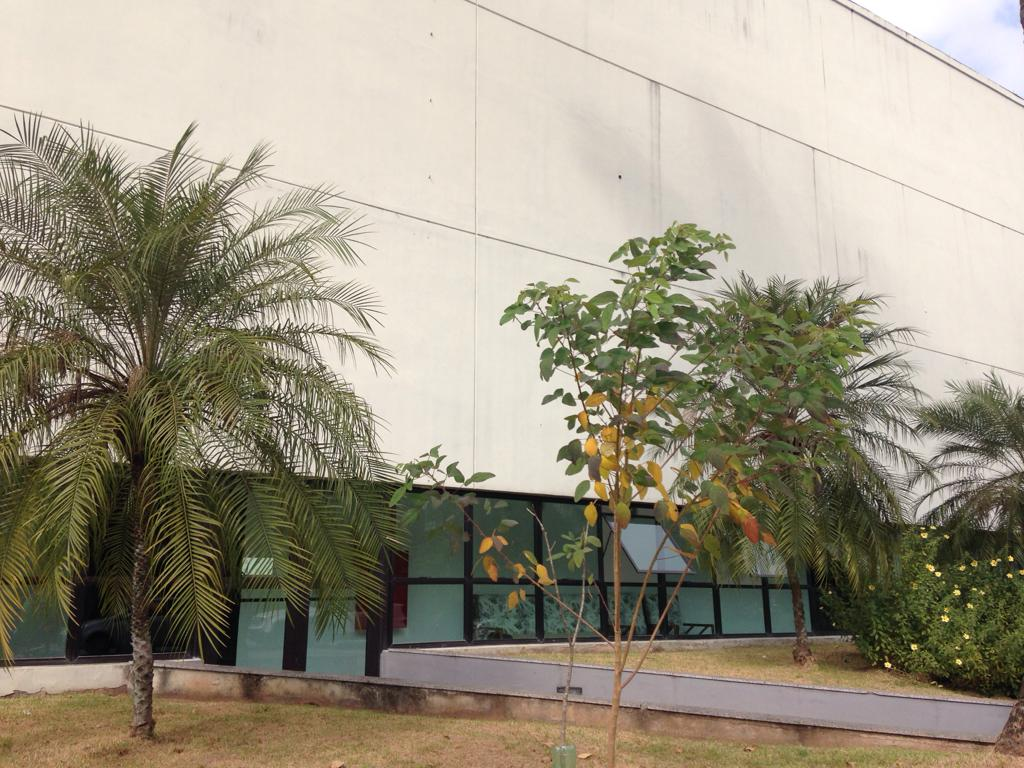
- Exterior of the theatre
- Interactive map of the Teatro Procópio Ferreira area

General information
- Location: R. Augusta, 2823; Cerqueira César, São Paulo, Brazil
- Coordinates: 23°33′54.73″S 46°40′3.49″W

Website
- Official website

Teatro Procópio Ferreira is a theatre in São Paulo, Brazil.
