= Luisa Bergalli =

Poet, librettist and writer

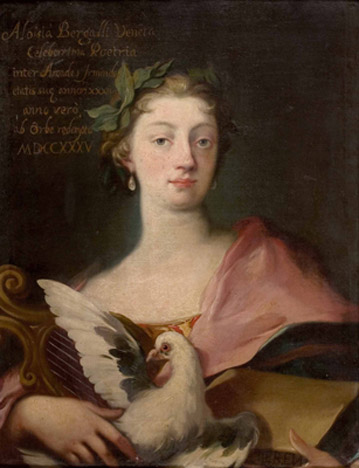
Luisa Bergalli

Luisa Bergalli (also Bergalli Gozzi; 15 April 1703 in Venice – 1779 in Venice), was a Venetian writer and translator. Bergalli and her husband Gasparo Gozzi translated novels, plays and other work. She herself translated Terence and Jean Racine into Italian. Bergalli also wrote poems, compositions, comic and tragic plays as well as a novel, Le avventure del poeta, published in 1730. She was friends with Rosalba Carriera.

== Life ==
Luisa Bergalli was born on 15 or 16 April 1703 in Venice. Her parents were Giovanni Giacomo, a Piedmontese merchant, and Diana Ingali. She was friends with Venetian poet Apostolo and Caterino Zeno, Antonio Sforza, and Luigi Quirini, and received encouragement in her writing from Apostolo.

Bergalli wrote poems, compositions, comic and tragic plays as well as a novel, Le avventure del poeta, published in 1730. Her first play Agide was presented in Venice at the Teatro di San Moisè in 1725. Zeno had been invited to write a play for the theatre, but passed the commission to Bergalli. Zeno was probably also responsible for Bergalli's admission to the Academy of Arcadia, where she called herself Irminda Partenide.

Bergalli was married to Gasparo Gozzi in 1738. He was ten years her junior, and she was aged 35. They had five children together in the first five years of marriage, and then when finances became difficult, needed to write to support the family. Bergalli and her husband translated novels, plays and other work. She herself translated Terence and Jean Racine into Italian.

Bergalli is included in a Dictionary of Pastellists before 1800 due to a letter she wrote to pastellist Rosalba Carriera, thanking her for a gift of pastels. Carriera had portrayed Bergalli in 1724.
