= Liliane Klein =

American actress

- Born: Liliane Patricia Zoe Klein; July 26, 1980 (age 46); New Hyde Park, New York, U.S.
- Education: Boston University (BFA)
- Occupations: Actress, singer, model
- Website: Liliane Klein profile

Liliane Patricia Zoe Klein (born July 26, 1980) is an American theatre and television actress, singer, and plus-size model.

Klein was born in New Hyde Park, New York. She graduated from Boston University College of Fine Arts, School of Theatre Arts in 2002 with her BFA cum laude in Acting. She is known for her roles as Helen in Neil LaBute's Fat Pig, and as Terry the Turtle in the PBS television series Kid Fitness. She became a plus-size model in 2002. She is a company member of Connecticut Free Shakespeare as well as a member of The Players. She is the vocal guide for Rose on the Stage Stars karaoke CD of Gypsy.

== Awards and nominations ==
In 2006 she was nominated for a New York Innovative Theatre Award at the 2nd Annual New York Innovative Theatre Awards for Best Actress for her portrayal of Rosemary Clooney in I Wanna Be Rosie at La MaMa Experimental Theatre Club. In 2007 she was nominated for an Elliot Norton Award at the 25th Annual Elliot Norton Awards for Outstanding Actress for her portrayal of Helen in Neil LaBute's Fat Pig in both the Bay Area and New England premieres of the play.

In 2008 she was nominated for an IRNE Award for Best Actress Drama for her portrayal of Helen in Neil LaBute's, Fat Pig (2004). In 2010 she was nominated for a Bay Area Theatre Critics Circle (BATCC) Award for her portrayal of Helen in Neil LaBute's Fat Pig (2009).

== Stage appearances ==
- Scrooge, The Musical (2002) (Lincoln Center/National Tour) – Charwoman/Mrs. Fezziwig
- Narrative Invtervention (2002) (HERE Arts Center; Off-Off-Broadway) – Ensemble
- Smokey Joe's Cafe (2004) (Ivoryton Playhouse) – Self
- The Greeks (2004) Manhattan Ensemble Theatre – Eucleia
- Titanic (2004 musical national tour of US/Canada) – Alice Beane
- As You Like It (2005) (Connecticut Free Shakespeare) – Audrey
- I Wanna Be Rosie (2005) (La MaMa; Off-Off-Broadway) – Rosemary Clooney
- Cyrano de Bergerac (2006; Connecticut Free Shakespeare) – Duena
- Me and My Girl (2006) (Musicals Tonight!; Off-Off-Broadway)– Mrs. Brown
- Fat Pig (2007) (SpeakEasy Stage Company, Boston Center for the Arts) – Helen
- Love's Labour's Lost (2007) (Connecticut Free Shakespeare) – Boyet
- A Streetcar Named Desire (2008) (Worcester Foothills Theatre) – Eunice Hubbell
- On the Town (2008; Staten Island Philharmonic) – Diana Dream
- The Cabaret Girl (2009) (Musicals Tonight!; Off-Off-Broadway) – Miss Simmons
- A Midsummer Night's Dream (2009) (Connecticut Free Shakespeare) – Snout
- Fat Pig (2009) (Aurora Theatre Company, Berkeley, California) – Helen
- The Most Ridiculous Thing You Ever Hoid (2010) (Urban Stages/New York Musical Theatre Festival) (Off-Broadway) – Mrs. Van Regal/Curley Sue

== Filmography ==
- Kid Fitness – Terry the Turtle – (8 episodes, 2005–2007)
- Conviction – Law Office Client (1 episode, 2006)
- Shut Up and Sing (2006/I) – Wedding Guest
- Traveler – Museum patron (1 episode, 2007)
- Z Rock – Slump Buster (1 episode, 2008)
- Ugly Betty – Assistant Casting Director (1 episode, 2008)

== Discography ==
- Gypsy, Stage Stars Karaoke CD – Rose
- Funny Girl, Stage Stars Karaoke CD – Ensemble
