= Azerbaijan State Theatre "Yuğ" =

Coordinates: 40°22′1.1″N 49°50′20.9″E

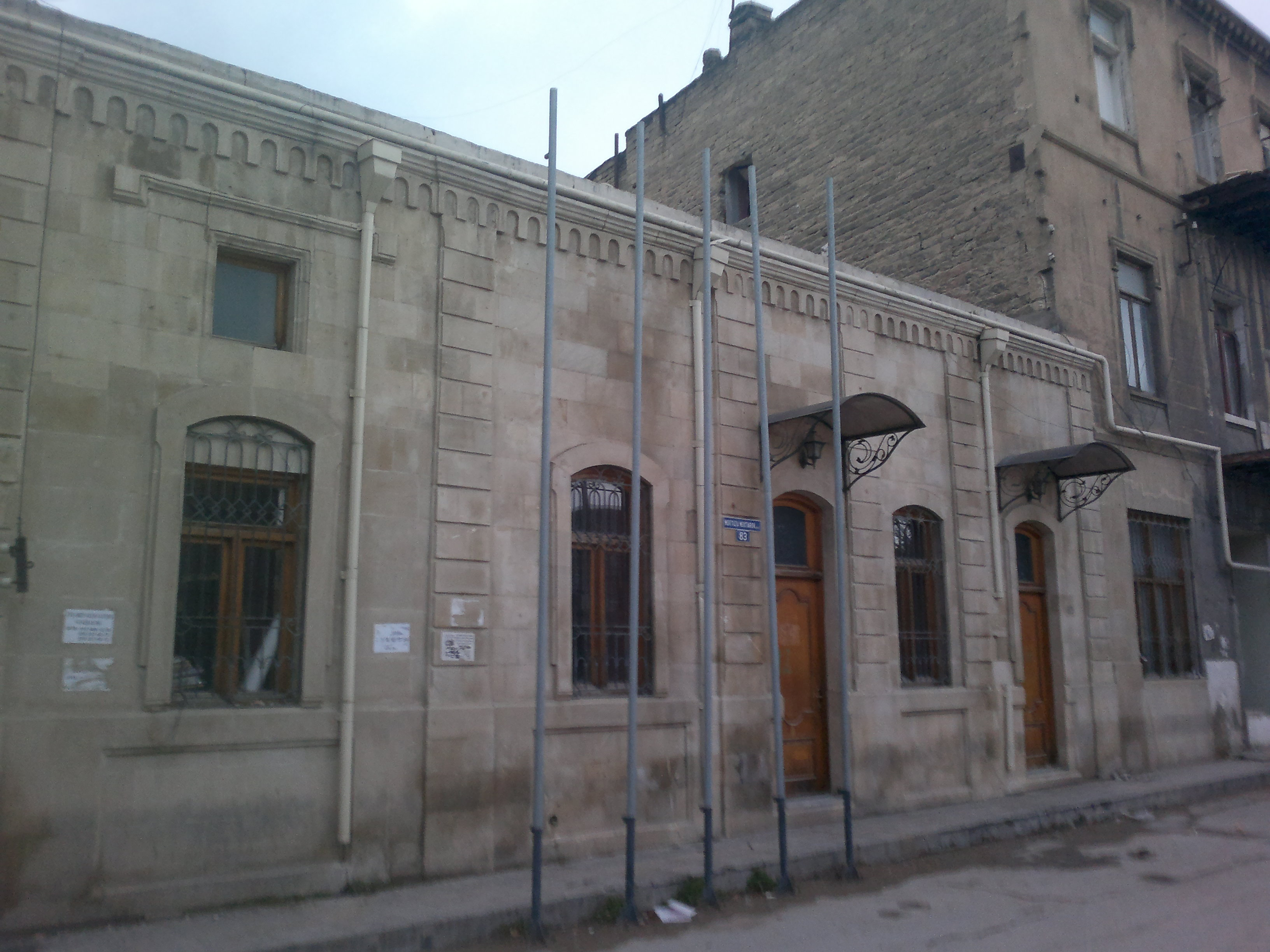
Building of the bath on 83 Murtuza Mukhtarov Street.

The theatre YUĞ was established in 1989 under the auspices of the Azerbaijan State Academic National Drama Theatre by Vagif Ibrahimoglu and Hasanaga Turabov. In 1992, the theatre got the status of ‘a state theatre’.

According to its creators, the name of the theatre carries a meaning: YUĞ means ‘an old rite’. Everything, however, is more complicated as it seems because this burial ritual during which were played the scenes from the life of the deceased, symbolizes a return to the memory. The actors try reminding the spectators of what they knew, maybe even in their past lives, but just forgot.

The main principle of this avant-garde theatre is the relevance of chosen topics, non-standard interpretation of familiar stories and experimenting with new forms. During its history, the Azerbaijan State Theatre YUĞ has staged more than 90 plays. The theatre's troupe participated in many international festivals. Today, the theatre YUĞ occupies a place in the theatre art of the country. It regularly stages plays by William Shakespeare, Johann Wolfgang von Goethe, Giovanni Boccaccio, Nikolai Gogol, Kōbō Abe, as well as Azerbaijani classical and contemporary authors.

Going beyond its space, the theatre YUĞ often collaborates with theatres of different countries, while enriching its skills and influencing the culture of others. The repertoire of the theatre includes the following performances: “Unforgettable Efendi” based on the play by the national writer Ilyas Efendiyev, “Hello from Kafka” based on the novel “The Verdict” by F.Kafka, “The first act” based on the Chekhov's play “The Cherry Orchard”, “The Shadow” based on the works Y.Nil “Love Under the Elm-tress”, “Come all who….” and others.

In 2014, the theatre hosted the premiere of the play “Unknown Akhundzade” staged based on the comedies of the Azerbaijani playwright and enlightener Mirza Fatali Akhundov and his philosophical treatise “The three letters of the Indian Prince Kemakud-Dowle to the Persian Prince Jalal-ud-Dowle”. Each season, the theatre offers new plays, tells us about new theatre personalities, some of whom determine the image of contemporary Azerbaijani theatre.
