= La donna serpente =

La donna serpente is a fable by Carlo Gozzi which premiered at the Teatro Sant'Angelo, Venice, in 1762. The play was adapted as a children's TV film, broadcast Rete 1, 26 March 1976, directed by it:Alessandro Brissoni, starring Ave Ninchi, Carlo Bagno, Enrico Osterman and Gianni Bortolotto.

== Plot ==
The plot concerns a fairy princess, Cherestani, whose marriage to a mortal Farruscad was opposed and given a curse-like condition by her father the fairy king Demogorgon. Farruscad is made to swear never to curse his wife Cherestani, no matter what she does. If he does, she will be transformed into a snake for 200 years.

== Opera settings ==
The fable was the basis for Wagner's Die Feen (1833) and Casella's La donna serpente (1932), but not—as sometimes incorrectly reported—Friedrich Heinrich Himmel's 1806 opera Die Sylphen, which is based on another Gozzi fable, La Zobeide.

Wagner's interest in Gozzi was probably influenced by his uncle Adolph Wagner's translation of another Gozzi fable Il corvo in 1804. Wagner altered and selected from Gozzi's plot, changing the names of Princess Cherestani and Farruscad to Ada and Arindal. The influence of other sections of La donna serpente not used by Wagner in Die Feen on the second act of Wagner's Parsifal has been noted.

Casella likewise changed the names of the protagonists to Miranda and Altidòr.
