= Antonio Sacco =

Italian improvisational actor

Antonio Sacchi (1708–1788) was an Italian improvisational actor, renowned for his performance as the Commedia dell'arte stock character Truffaldino. Sacchi's lasting influence was in requesting playwright Carlo Goldoni to provide a dramatic structure to his improvised routines, resulting in plays such as Truffaldino's 32 Mishaps (1738–40), Truffaldino's Son Lost and Found (1746), and the masterpiece A Servant of Two Masters (1745–53), which serve as the best permanent record of this impromptu and momentary art form. Sacchi toured throughout Europe with his own Commedia troupe from 1738 to 1753, and both David Garrick and Casanova spoke highly of his talents.
