= Kathleen Kelly (conductor) =

American conductor

Kathleen Kelly is an American conductor, coach, and collaborative pianist. She has worked with the world's leading opera companies and young artist programs, including The Metropolitan Opera, the Vienna State Opera, Glimmerglass Opera, and San Francisco Opera, among others. She is currently on the faculty of the Cincinnati College-Conservatory of Music.

== Early life ==
Kelly holds both bachelor's and master's degrees in music from Arizona State University. Kelly was originally unsure if she wanted to be a professional musician, until she was thrown out of Professor Steven DeGroote piano studio during her junior year, citing lack of discipline.

This motivated Kelly, and she went on to complete two degrees in piano performance at ASU before spending a Fulbright year in Germany, after which she joined the Merola program at San Francisco Opera. She then joined the company as a pianist, rehearsal conductor and prompter.

== Career ==
After her tenure at San Francisco Opera, Kelly joined the Metropolitan Opera from 1997 to 2006, specializing in the works of Wagner, Strauss, and Berg. During that time she was the focus of a Wall Street Journal article and a Metropolitan Opera radio broadcast feature. From 2003 to 2008 she was also the music director of the Berkshire Opera.

Kelly went on to be the head of music staff for the Houston Grand Opera, and well as director of the Houston Grand Opera Studio from 2006 to 2010.

As the head of music staff at Vienna State Opera from 2010-2013, Kelly oversaw the daily musical life of more the fifty ensemble singers in more than fifty operas. At the Staatsoper she also curated a recital series in the house’s famous Mahlersaal, and served as the series’ principal pianist. She was the recitative accompanist for new productions of Le nozze di Figaro and Don Giovanni, and assisted Maestro Franz Welser-Möst on new productions.

Kelly has also been associated with the Glimmerglass Festival’s Young American Artist Program, the CoOperative Training Program at Westminster Choir College, the Seattle Opera, Opera Australia, and the Moscow Conservatory. As a recital pianist she has appeared at Carnegie Hall, the Kennedy Center, and Vienna’s Musikverein.

She taught at the University of Texas at Austin, and the University of Michigan School of Music, Theatre & Dance, and teaches currently at training programs across the country.
